= 2012 United States House of Representatives elections in Florida =

- November 6, 2012

All 27 Florida seats to the United States House of Representatives
	Majority party	Minority party
Party	Republican	Democratic
Last election	19	6
Seats won	17	10
Seat change	▼2	▲4
Popular vote	4,157,046	3,678,725
Percentage	51.61%	45.67%
Swing	▼4.00%	▲7.63%

Republican
30–40%
50–60%
60–70%
70–80%
80–90%
90–100%
Democratic
50–60%
60–70%
70–80%
80–90%
90–100%

The 2012 United States House of Representatives elections in Florida were held on Tuesday, November 6, 2012, to elect the 27 congressional representatives from the state, one from each of the state's 27 congressional districts, a two-seat increase due to the 2010 United States census. The elections coincided with the elections of other federal and state offices, including a quadrennial presidential election and a U.S. Senate election. The primary elections were held on August 14, 2012.

== Redistricting ==
In November 2010, Florida voters passed two amendments to the Florida Constitution which would require congressional and state legislative districts to be compact and follow geographical boundaries, thereby preventing gerrymandering. Shortly after the amendments were passed, U.S. Representatives Corrine Brown and Mario Diaz-Balart filed a lawsuit asking that the amendment concerning congressional districts be declared invalid. Brown and Diaz-Balart alleged that the power to change rules for congressional redistricting lies exclusively with the state legislature, and as such cannot be changed through a referendum; however, in January 2012 a three-judge panel of the 11th U.S. Circuit Court of Appeals rejected their arguments.

Redistricting legislation which would create one new district each in North Florida and Central Florida was passed by a committee of the Florida House of Representatives on January 27, by the full House of Representatives on February 3, and by the Florida Senate on February 9. Shortly after, the Florida Democratic Party announced it would file a lawsuit, alleging that the map violated the Fair Districts provision, which requires that maps do not intentionally favor parties or incumbents. Separately, a coalition of groups including Common Cause, the League of Women Voters and the National Council of La Raza announced it would file its own challenge on the legislation's being signed into law.

== Overview ==
The table below shows the total number and percentage of votes, as well as the number of seats gained and lost by each political party in the election for the United States House of Representatives in Florida. All vote totals come from the Florida Secretary of State's website along with the individual counties' election department websites.

United States House of Representatives elections in Florida, 2012
Party	Votes	Percentage	Seats	+/–
Republican	4,157,046	51.61%	17	−2
Democratic	3,678,725	45.67%	10	+4
Other Parties	219,374	2.72%	0	—
Totals	8,055,145	100%	27	+2

== District 1 ==
2012 Florida's 1st congressional district election
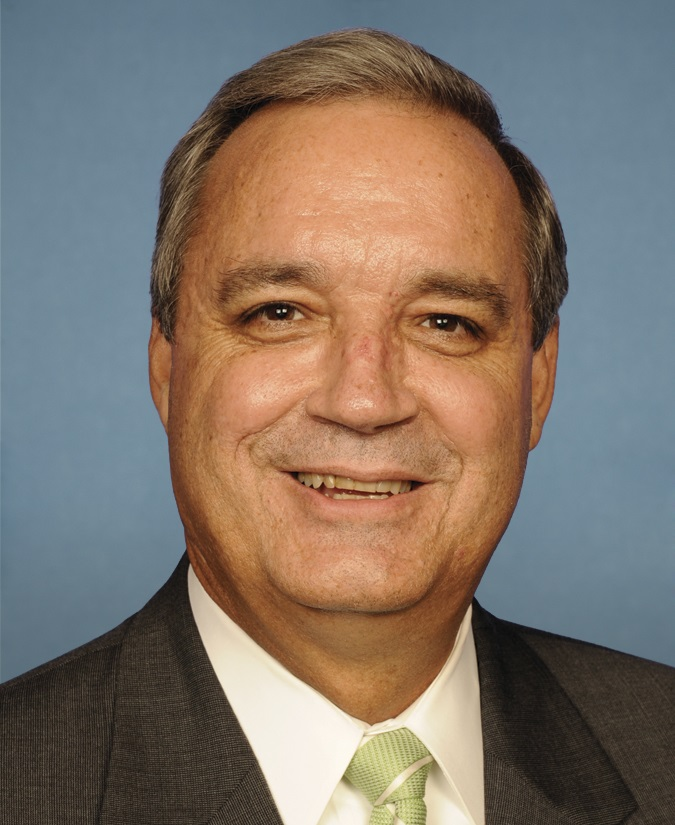

Nominee	Jeff Miller	Jim Bryan
Party	Republican	Democratic
Popular vote	238,440	92,961
Percentage	69.6%	27.1%
- County results Miller: 60–70% 70–80%
U.S. Representative before election
Jeff Miller
Republican
Elected U.S. Representative
Jeff Miller
Republican

Florida's new 1st district voting age population was 77.6% White (single race), 12.9% Black (includes multirace), 4.3% Hispanic (excludes Hispanic Black), 0.3% Hispanic Black (includes multirace), and 5% other races. Republican incumbent Jeff Miller, who had represented Florida's 1st congressional district since 2001, ran for re-election and secured the Republican nomination unopposed.

=== Republican primary ===
==== Candidates ====
===== Nominee =====
- Jeff Miller, incumbent U.S. representative

=== Democratic primary ===
==== Candidates ====
===== Nominee =====
- James Bryan, Army veteran

=== Libertarian primary ===
==== Candidates ====
===== Nominee =====
- Calen Fretts, vice chair of the Libertarian Party of Okaloosa County

=== Independents ===
William Cleave Drummond, II ran for election as a write-in candidate.

=== General election ===
==== Endorsements ====
Jeff Miller (R)

Organizations

- Campaign for Working Families
- National Rifle Association - Political Victory Fund

==== Predictions ====
Source	Ranking	As of
The Cook Political Report	Safe R	November 5, 2012
Rothenberg	Safe R	November 2, 2012
Roll Call	Safe R	November 4, 2012
Sabato's Crystal Ball	Safe R	November 5, 2012
NY Times	Safe R	November 4, 2012
RCP	Safe R	November 4, 2012
The Hill	Safe R	November 4, 2012

==== Results ====
Florida's 1st congressional district, 2012
Party	Candidate	Votes	%
Republican	Jeff Miller (incumbent)	238,440	69.6
Democratic	Jim Bryan	92,961	27.1
Libertarian	Calen Fretts	11,176	3.3
Independent	William Cleave (write-in)	17	0.0
Total votes		342,594	100.0
Republican hold			

== District 2 ==
2012 Florida's 2nd congressional district election
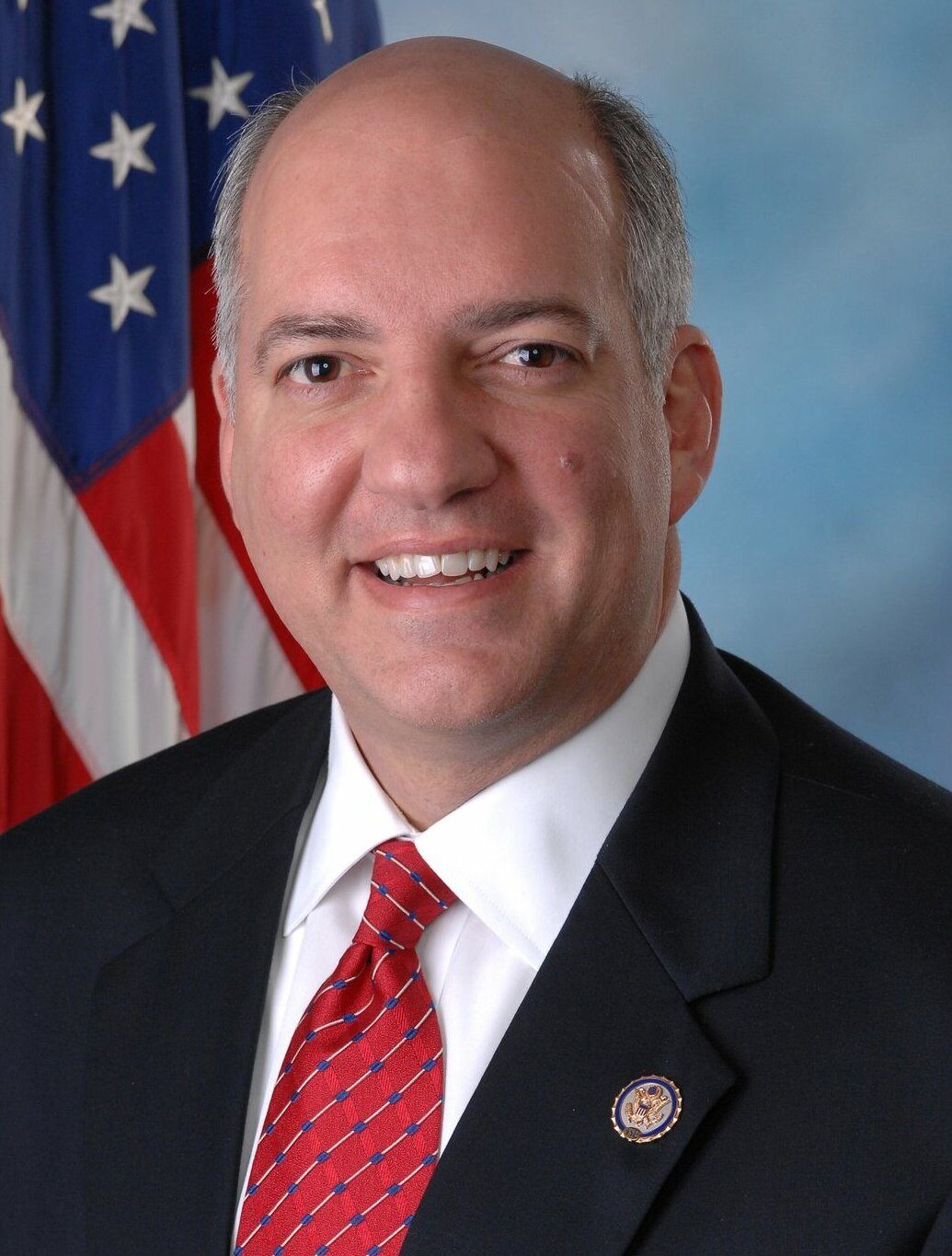

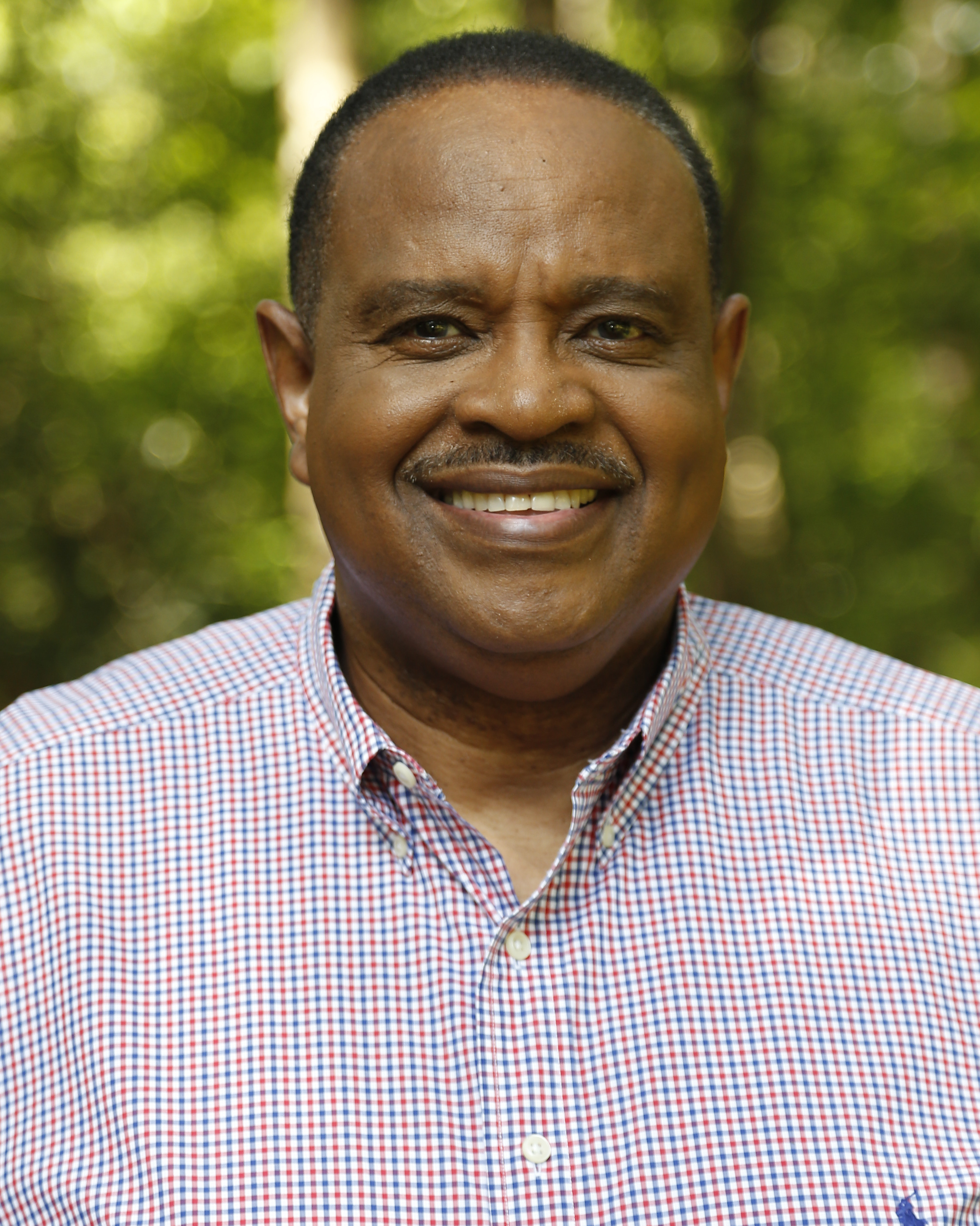
Nominee	Steve Southerland	Al Lawson
Party	Republican	Democratic
Popular vote	175,856	157,634
Percentage	52.7%	47.2%
- County results Southerland: 50–60% 60–70% 70–80% Lawson: 50–60% 60–70% 70–80%
U.S. Representative before election
Steve Southerland
Republican
Elected U.S. Representative
Steve Southerland
Republican

Florida's new 2nd district voting age population was 68.5% non-Hispanic White (single race), 23.5% non-Hispanic Black (includes multirace), 4.4% Hispanic (excludes Hispanic Black), 0.3% Hispanic Black (includes multirace), and 3.3% other races (non-Hispanic). Republican incumbent Steve Southerland was first elected to represent Florida's 2nd congressional district in 2010 and secured the Republican nomination unopposed.

=== Republican primary ===
==== Candidates ====
===== Nominee =====
- Steve Southerland, incumbent U.S. representative

=== Democratic primary ===
Former Republican state senator Nancy Argenziano was barred from running as a Democrat by state law, and tried to run on the Independent Party of Florida line, but ultimately withdrew.

==== Candidates ====
===== Nominee =====
- Al Lawson, state senator and candidate for this seat in 2010

===== Eliminated in primary =====
- Leonard Bembry, state representative
- Alvin Peters, attorney and former chairman of the Bay County Democratic Party
- Mark Schlakman

===== Withdrawn =====
- Nancy Argenziano, former Republican state senator
- Jay Liles, activist

==== Primary results ====
Democratic primary results
Party	Candidate	Votes	%
Democratic	Al Lawson	46,900	54.6
Democratic	Leonard Bembry	22,357	26.0
Democratic	Alvin L. Peters	11,919	13.9
Democratic	Mark Schlakman	4,653	5.4
Total votes		85,829	100.0

=== General election ===
==== Endorsements ====
Steve Southerland (R)

Organizations

- Campaign for Working Families
- Eagle Forum
- National Rifle Association - Political Victory Fund
Al Lawson (D)

Organizations

- Democratic Congressional Campaign Committee "Red to Blue" Program

==== Polling ====
Poll source	Date(s) administered	Sample size	Margin of error	Steve Southerland (R)	Al Lawson (D)	Undecided
StPetePolls	October 3–5, 2012	450	± 4.6%	46%	47%	8%
Lester (D-DCCC)	September 15–17, 2012	401	± 4.9%	43%	43%	14%

==== Predictions ====
Source	Ranking	As of
The Cook Political Report	Lean R	November 5, 2012
Rothenberg	Likely R	November 2, 2012
Roll Call	Lean R	November 17, 2012
Sabato's Crystal Ball	Lean R	December 12, 2012
NY Times	Lean R	November 4, 2012
RCP	Lean R	November 4, 2012
The Hill	Likely R	November 4, 2012

==== Results ====
Southerland defeated Lawson for re-election to a second term, 53% to 47%, on November 6, 2012.

Florida's 2nd congressional district, 2012
Party	Candidate	Votes	%
Republican	Steve Southerland (incumbent)	175,856	52.7
Democratic	Al Lawson	157,634	47.2
Independent	Floyd Patrick Miller (write-in)	228	0.1
Total votes		333,718	100.0
Republican hold			

== District 3 ==
2012 Florida's 3rd congressional district election
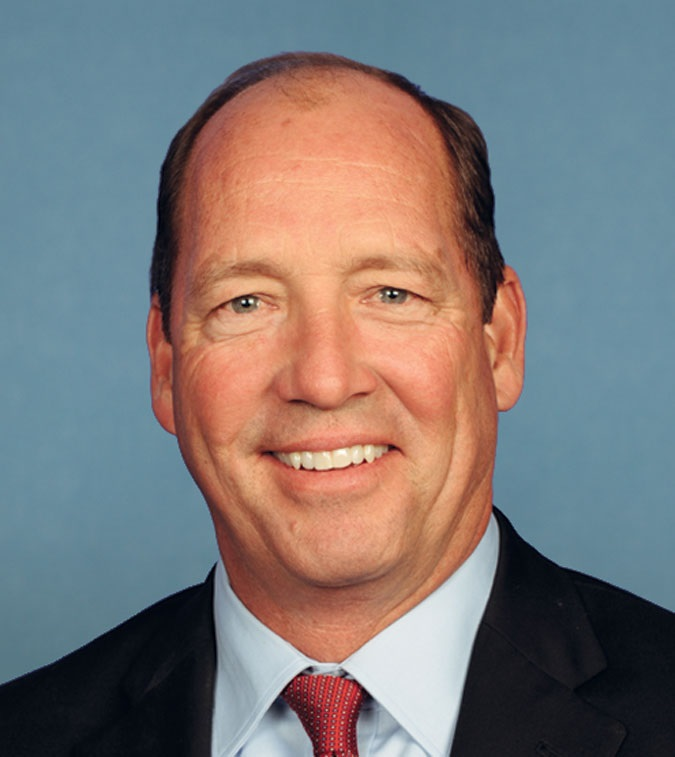

Nominee	Ted Yoho	J. R. Gaillot
Party	Republican	Democratic
Popular vote	204,331	102,468
Percentage	64.7%	32.5%
- County results Yoho: 40–50% 50–60% 60–70% 70–80% 80–90%
U.S. Representative before election
Cliff Stearns
Republican
Elected U.S. Representative
Ted Yoho
Republican

Florida's new 3rd district voting age population was 75.8% non-Hispanic White (single race), 12.9% non-Hispanic Black (includes multirace), 6.7% Hispanic (excludes Hispanic Black), 0.3% Hispanic Black (includes multirace), and 4.3% other races (non-Hispanic). Republican Cliff Stearns, who had represented the 6th district since 1989, had his home in Ocala drawn into the neighboring 11th district. However, he opted to seek reelection in the 3rd, which contained more than two-thirds of his former territory.

=== Republican primary ===
Stearns was upset in the primary by Ted Yoho, a large-animal veterinarian from Gainesville.

==== Candidates ====
===== Nominee =====
- Ted Yoho, veterinarian

===== Eliminated in primary =====
- James Jett, police officer
- Steve Oelrich, state senator
- Cliff Stearns, incumbent U.S. representative

==== Primary results ====
2012 Republican primary results by county Yoho: 40–50%; 50–60%; 60–70%; Stearns: 40–50%

Republican primary results
Party	Candidate	Votes	%
Republican	Ted Yoho	22,273	34.4
Republican	Cliff Stearns (incumbent)	21,398	33.0
Republican	Steve Oelrich	12,329	19.0
Republican	James Jett	8,769	13.5
Total votes		64,769	100.0

=== Democratic primary ===
==== Candidates ====
===== Nominee =====
- J.R. Gaillot, policy consultant

=== General election ===
==== Endorsements ====
Ted Yoho (R)

Organizations

- National Republican Congressional Committee "Vanguard" Program
- National Rifle Association - Political Victory Fund
- Tea Party Express

==== Polling ====
Poll source	Date(s) administered	Sample size	Margin of error	Ted Yoho (R)	J. R. Gaillot (D)	Undecided
StPetePolls	September 1–3, 2012	668	± 5.0%	56%	31%	13%

==== Predictions ====
Source	Ranking	As of
The Cook Political Report	Safe R	November 5, 2012
Rothenberg	Safe R	November 2, 2012
Roll Call	Safe R	November 4, 2012
Sabato's Crystal Ball	Safe R	November 5, 2012
NY Times	Safe R	November 4, 2012
RCP	Safe R	November 4, 2012
The Hill	Safe R	November 4, 2012

==== Results ====
Florida's 3rd congressional district, 2012
Party	Candidate	Votes	%
Republican	Ted Yoho	204,331	64.7
Democratic	J. R. Gaillot	102,468	32.5
Independent	Philip Dodds	8,870	2.8
Total votes		315,669	100.0
Republican hold			

== District 4 ==
2012 Florida's 4th congressional district election
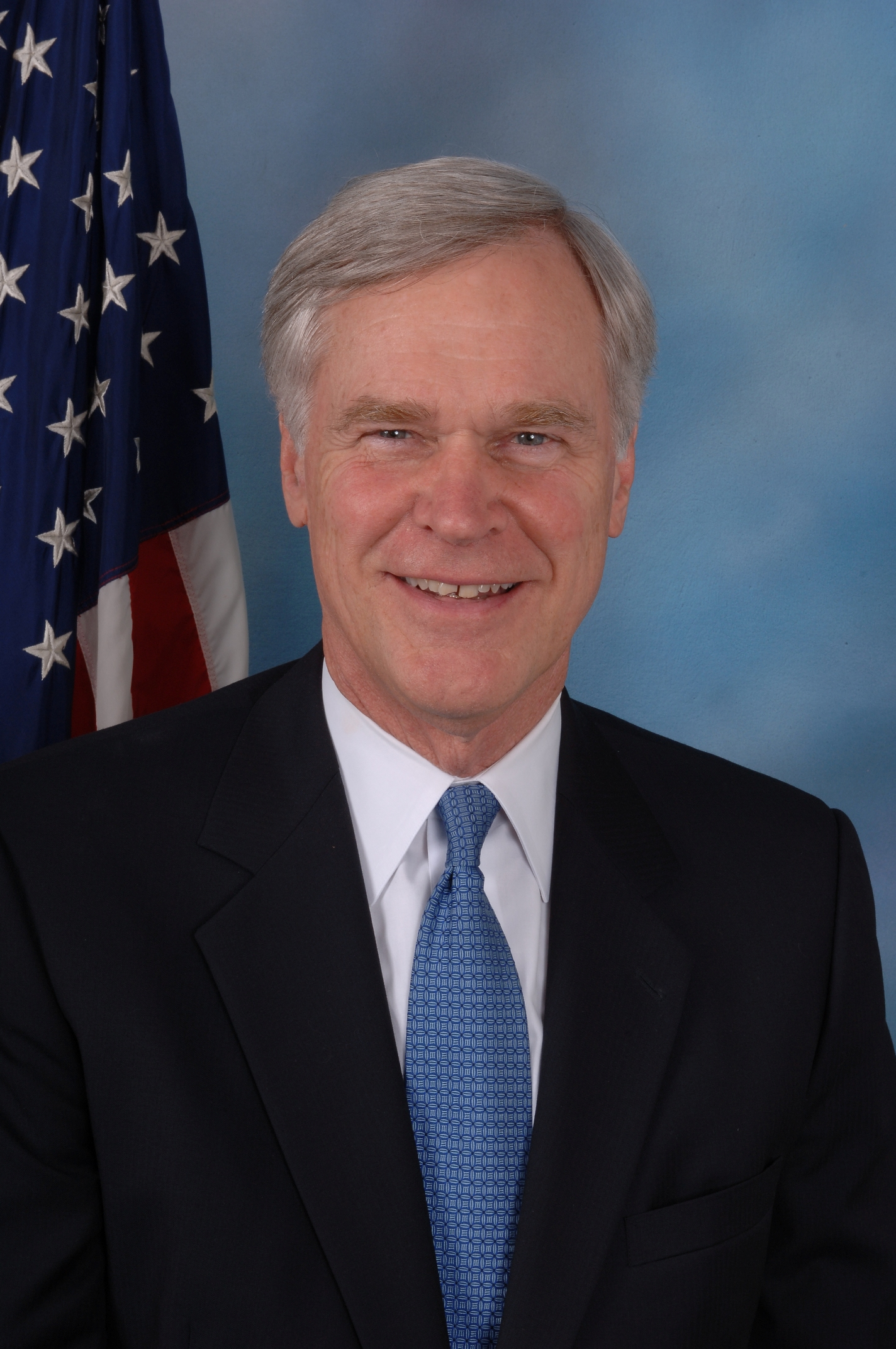

Nominee	Ander Crenshaw	Jim Klauder
Party	Republican	Independent
Popular vote	239,988	75,236
Percentage	76.1%	23.8%
- County results Crenshaw: 70–80% 80–90%
U.S. Representative before election
Ander Crenshaw
Republican
Elected U.S. Representative
Ander Crenshaw
Republican

Florida's new 4th district voting age population was 74.9% non-Hispanic White (single race), 12.5% non-Hispanic Black (includes multirace), 6.3% Hispanic (excludes Hispanic Black), 0.4% Hispanic Black (includes multirace), and 5.9% other races (non-Hispanic). Republican incumbent Ander Crenshaw, who had represented the 4th district since 2001, ran for re-election.

=== Republican primary ===
==== Candidates ====
===== Nominee =====
- Ander Crenshaw, incumbent U.S. representative

===== Eliminated in primary =====
- Bob Black
- Deborah Pueschel

==== Primary results ====
Republican primary results
Party	Candidate	Votes	%
Republican	Ander Crenshaw (incumbent)	46,788	71.9
Republican	Bob Black	11,816	18.1
Republican	Deborah Katz Pueschel	6,505	10.0
Total votes		65,109	100.0

=== Democratic primary ===
==== Candidates ====
===== Withdrawn =====
- Gary Koniz

=== General election ===
==== Endorsements ====
Ander Crenshaw (R)

Organizations

- Campaign for Working Families
- National Rifle Association - Political Victory Fund

==== Predictions ====
Source	Ranking	As of
The Cook Political Report	Safe R	November 5, 2012
Rothenberg	Safe R	November 2, 2012
Roll Call	Safe R	November 4, 2012
Sabato's Crystal Ball	Safe R	November 5, 2012
NY Times	Safe R	November 4, 2012
RCP	Safe R	November 4, 2012
The Hill	Safe R	November 4, 2012

==== Results ====
Florida's 4th congressional district, 2012
Party	Candidate	Votes	%
Republican	Ander Crenshaw (incumbent)	239,988	76.1
Independent	Jim Klauder	75,236	23.8
Independent	Gary Koniz (write-in)	246	0.1
Total votes		315,470	100.0
Republican hold			

== District 5 ==
2012 Florida's 5th congressional district election
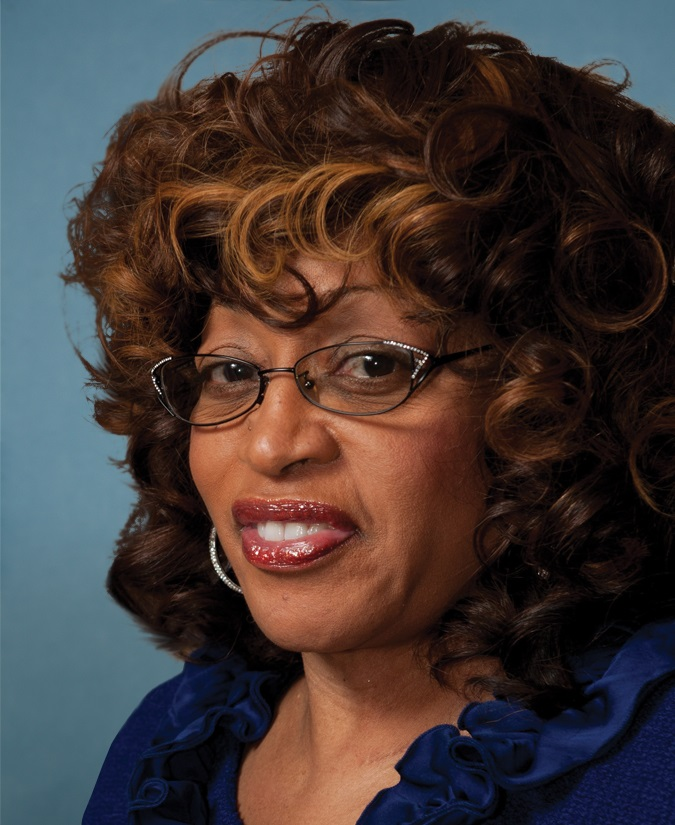

Nominee	Corrine Brown	LeAnne Kolb
Party	Democratic	Republican
Popular vote	190,472	70,700
Percentage	70.8%	26.3%
- County results Brown: 60–70% 70–80% Kolb: 40–50% 50–60% 70–80%
U.S. Representative before election
Corrine Brown
Democratic
Elected U.S. Representative
Corrine Brown
Democratic

Florida's new 5th district voting age population was 49% non-Hispanic Black (includes multirace), 36.2% non-Hispanic White (single race), 10% Hispanic (excludes Hispanic Black), 1.1% Hispanic Black (includes multirace), and 3.7% other races (non-Hispanic). It is the successor to the former 3rd district, which had been represented by Democrat Corrine Brown since 1993.

=== Democratic primary ===
==== Candidates ====
===== Nominee =====
- Corrine Brown, incumbent U.S. representative

=== Republican primary ===
==== Candidates ====
===== Nominee =====
- LeAnne Kolb

===== Withdrawn =====
- Mike Yost, nominee for this seat in 2010

=== Libertarian primary ===
Gerald Nyren announced plans to run as a Libertarian Party candidate.

=== General election ===
==== Endorsements ====
Corrine Brown (D)

Labor unions

- AFL-CIO
- International Brotherhood of Boilermakers
- National Association of Letter Carriers

==== Predictions ====
Source	Ranking	As of
The Cook Political Report	Safe D	November 5, 2012
Rothenberg	Safe D	November 2, 2012
Roll Call	Safe D	November 4, 2012
Sabato's Crystal Ball	Safe D	November 5, 2012
NY Times	Safe D	November 4, 2012
RCP	Safe D	November 4, 2012
The Hill	Safe D	November 4, 2012

==== Results ====
Florida's 5th congressional district, 2012
Party	Candidate	Votes	%
Democratic	Corrine Brown (incumbent)	190,472	70.8
Republican	LeAnne Kolb	70,700	26.3
Independent	Eileen Fleming	7,978	3.0
Independent	Bruce Raey Riggs (write-in)	3	0.0
Total votes		269,153	100.0
Democratic hold			

== District 6 ==
2012 Florida's 6th congressional district election
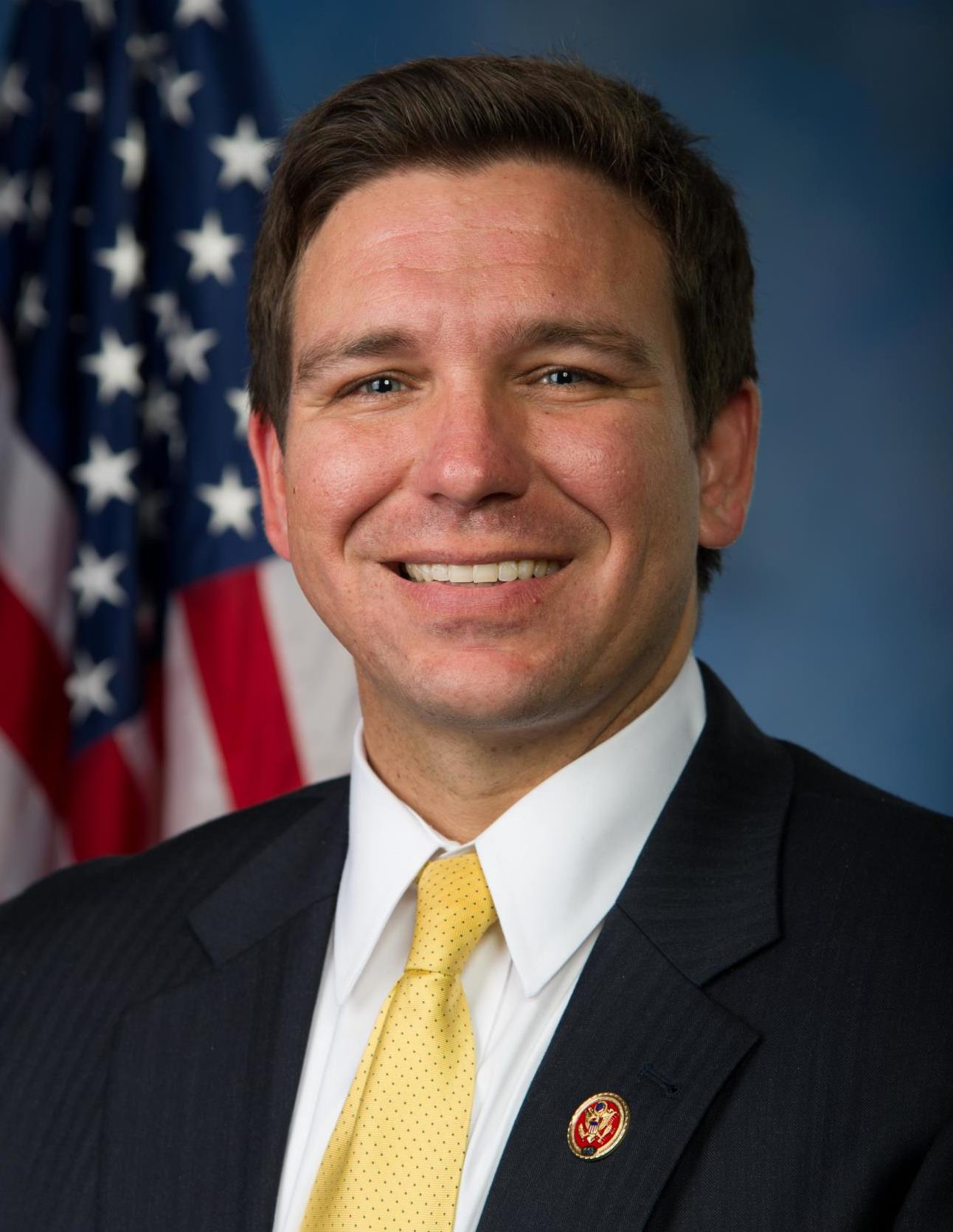

Nominee	Ron DeSantis	Heather Beaven
Party	Republican	Democratic
Popular vote	195,962	146,489
Percentage	57.2%	41.4%
- County results DeSantis: 50–60% 60–70%
U.S. Representative before election
John Mica
Republican
Elected U.S. Representative
Ron DeSantis
Republican

In redistricting, most of the old 7th district was renumbered as the new 6th district. John Mica, who had represented the 7th district since 1993, had his home drawn into the neighboring 7th district, and opted to seek re-election there.

Florida's new 6th district voting age population was 82.8% non-Hispanic White (single race), 8.8% non-Hispanic Black (includes multirace), 5.4% Hispanic (excludes Hispanic Black), 0.3% Hispanic Black (includes multirace), and 2.7% other races (non-Hispanic).

=== Republican primary ===
==== Candidates ====
===== Nominee =====
- Ron DeSantis, Iraq War veteran, former prosecutor and future Florida governor

===== Eliminated in primary =====
- Richard Clark, member of the Jacksonville City Council
- Fred Costello, state representative
- William Billy Kogut
- Craig Miller, businessman and Vietnam War veteran
- Alec Pueschel
- Beverly Slough, chairman of St. Johns County School District Board

===== Declined =====
- John Mica, incumbent U.S. representative

==== Primary results ====
Republican primary results
Party	Candidate	Votes	%
Republican	Ron DeSantis	24,132	38.8
Republican	Fred Costello	14,189	22.8
Republican	Beverly Slough	8,229	13.2
Republican	Craig Miller	8,113	13.1
Republican	Richard Clark	6,090	9.8
Republican	Alec Pueschel	739	1.2
Republican	William Billy Kogut	628	1.0
Total votes		62,120	100.0

=== Democratic primary ===
==== Candidates ====
===== Nominee =====
- Heather Beaven, former Navy cryptologist and nominee for the 7th district in 2010

===== Eliminated in primary =====
- Vipin Verma, attorney

==== Primary results ====
Democratic primary results
Party	Candidate	Votes	%
Democratic	Heather Beaven	29,909	80.5
Democratic	Vipin Verma	7,253	19.5
Total votes		37,162	100.0

=== General election ===
==== Endorsements ====
Ron DeSantis (R)

Organizations

- Campaign for Working Families
- Eagle Forum
- Iraq Veterans for Congress
- National Republican Congressional Committee "Vanguard" Program
- National Rifle Association - Political Victory Fund
- Tea Party Express
Heather Beaven (D)

Labor unions

- AFL-CIO
- International Brotherhood of Boilermakers
- National Association of Letter Carriers

==== Predictions ====
Source	Ranking	As of
The Cook Political Report	Safe R	November 5, 2012
Rothenberg	Safe R	November 2, 2012
Roll Call	Safe R	November 4, 2012
Sabato's Crystal Ball	Safe R	November 5, 2012
NY Times	Safe R	November 4, 2012
RCP	Safe R	November 4, 2012
The Hill	Safe R	November 4, 2012

==== Results ====
Florida's 6th congressional district, 2012
Party	Candidate	Votes	%
Republican	Ron DeSantis	195,962	57.3
Democratic	Heather Beaven	146,489	42.8
Total votes		342,451	100.0
Republican hold			

== District 7 ==
2012 Florida's 7th congressional district election
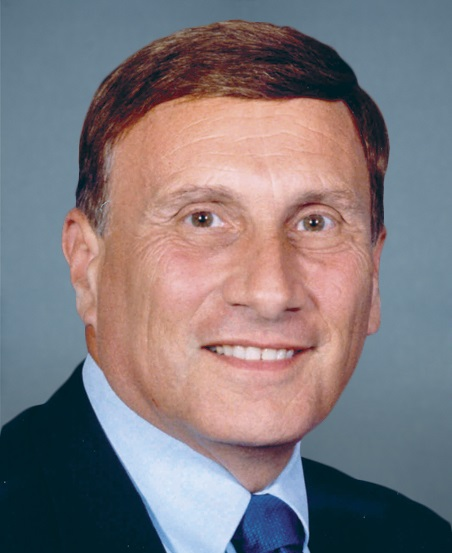

Nominee	John Mica	Jason Kendall
Party	Republican	Democratic
Popular vote	185,518	130,479
Percentage	58.7%	41.3%
- County results Mica: 50–60% 60–70%
U.S. Representative before election
John Mica (Republican)
Sandy Adams (Republican)
Elected U.S. Representative
John Mica
Republican

The new 7th district is the successor to the old 24th district, represented by Republican Sandy Adams since 2011. John Mica, who had represented the old 7th district since 1993, had his home drawn into the new 7th. The new 7th district voting age population was 70.2% non-Hispanic White (single race), 8.1% non-Hispanic Black (includes multirace), 8.1 percent Hispanic (excludes Hispanic Black), 0.9 percent Hispanic Black (includes multirace) and 4.7% other races (non-Hispanic).

=== Republican primary ===
==== Candidates ====
===== Nominee =====
- John Mica, incumbent U.S. representative from the 6th district

===== Eliminated in primary =====
- Sandy Adams, incumbent U.S. representative from the 24th district

==== Endorsements ====
Sandy Adams

Organizations

- Eagle Forum
- Maggie's List
- Susan B. Anthony List

==== Primary results ====
2012 Republican primary results by county Mica 60–70%

Mica defeated Adams in the Republican primary with 61 percent of the vote.

Republican primary results
Party	Candidate	Votes	%
Republican	John Mica (incumbent)	32,119	61.2
Republican	Sandy Adams (incumbent)	20,404	38.8
Total votes		52,523	100.0

=== Democratic primary ===
==== Candidates ====
===== Nominee =====
- Jason Kendall, social media consultant and sales manager

===== Eliminated in primary =====
- Nicholas Ruiz

==== Primary results ====
Democratic primary results
Party	Candidate	Votes	%
Democratic	Jason H. Kendall	12,816	61.3
Democratic	Nicholas Ruiz	8,088	38.7
Total votes		20,904	100.0

=== General election ===
==== Endorsements ====
John Mica (R)

Organizations

- Campaign for Working Families
- National Rifle Association - Political Victory Fund

==== Predictions ====
Source	Ranking	As of
The Cook Political Report	Safe R	November 5, 2012
Rothenberg	Safe R	November 2, 2012
Roll Call	Safe R	November 4, 2012
Sabato's Crystal Ball	Safe R	November 5, 2012
NY Times	Safe R	November 4, 2012
RCP	Safe R	November 4, 2012
The Hill	Safe R	November 4, 2012

==== Results ====
Florida's 7th congressional district, 2012
Party	Candidate	Votes	%
Republican	John Mica (incumbent)	185,518	58.7
Democratic	Jason H. Kenall	130,479	41.3
Independent	Fred Marra (write-in)	13	0.0
Total votes		316,010	100.0
Republican hold			

== District 8 ==
2012 Florida's 8th congressional district election
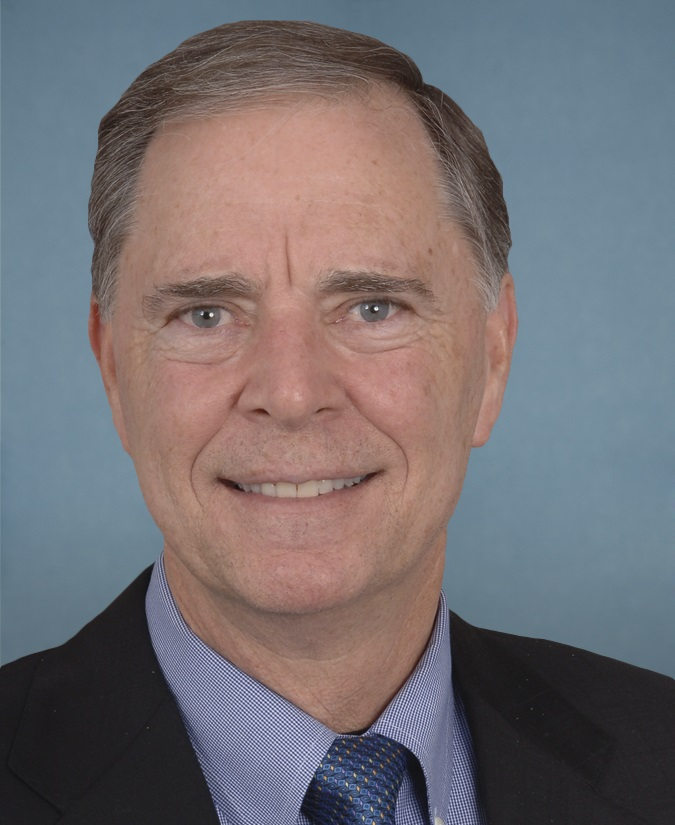

Nominee	Bill Posey	Shannon Roberts
Party	Republican	Democratic
Popular vote	205,432	130,870
Percentage	58.9%	37.5%
- County results Posey: 50–60%
U.S. Representative before election
Bill Posey
Republican
Elected U.S. Representative
Bill Posey
Republican

The new 8th district was the successor to the 15th district, represented by Republican Bill Posey since 2009. The voting age population was 80.4% non-Hispanic White (single race), 8.7% non-Hispanic Black (includes multirace), 7.3% Hispanic (excludes Hispanic Black), 0.4% Hispanic Black (includes multirace), and 3.2% other races (non-Hispanic).

=== Republican primary ===
==== Candidates ====
===== Nominee =====
- Bill Posey, incumbent U.S. representative

=== Democratic primary ===
==== Candidates ====
===== Nominee =====
- Shannon Roberts, former NASA & federal official and Cape Canaveral City Council member

=== General election ===
==== Endorsements ====
Bill Posey (R)

Organizations

- Campaign for Working Families
- National Rifle Association - Political Victory Fund
Shannon Roberts (D)

Labor unions

- AFL-CIO

==== Predictions ====
Source	Ranking	As of
The Cook Political Report	Safe R	November 5, 2012
Rothenberg	Safe R	November 2, 2012
Roll Call	Safe R	November 4, 2012
Sabato's Crystal Ball	Safe R	November 5, 2012
NY Times	Safe R	November 4, 2012
RCP	Safe R	November 4, 2012
The Hill	Safe R	November 4, 2012

==== Results ====
Florida's 8th congressional district, 2012
Party	Candidate	Votes	%
Republican	Bill Posey (incumbent)	205,432	58.9
Democratic	Shannon Roberts	130,870	37.5
Independent	Richard Gillmor	12,607	3.6
Total votes		348,909	100.0
Republican hold			

== District 9 ==
2012 Florida's 9th congressional district election
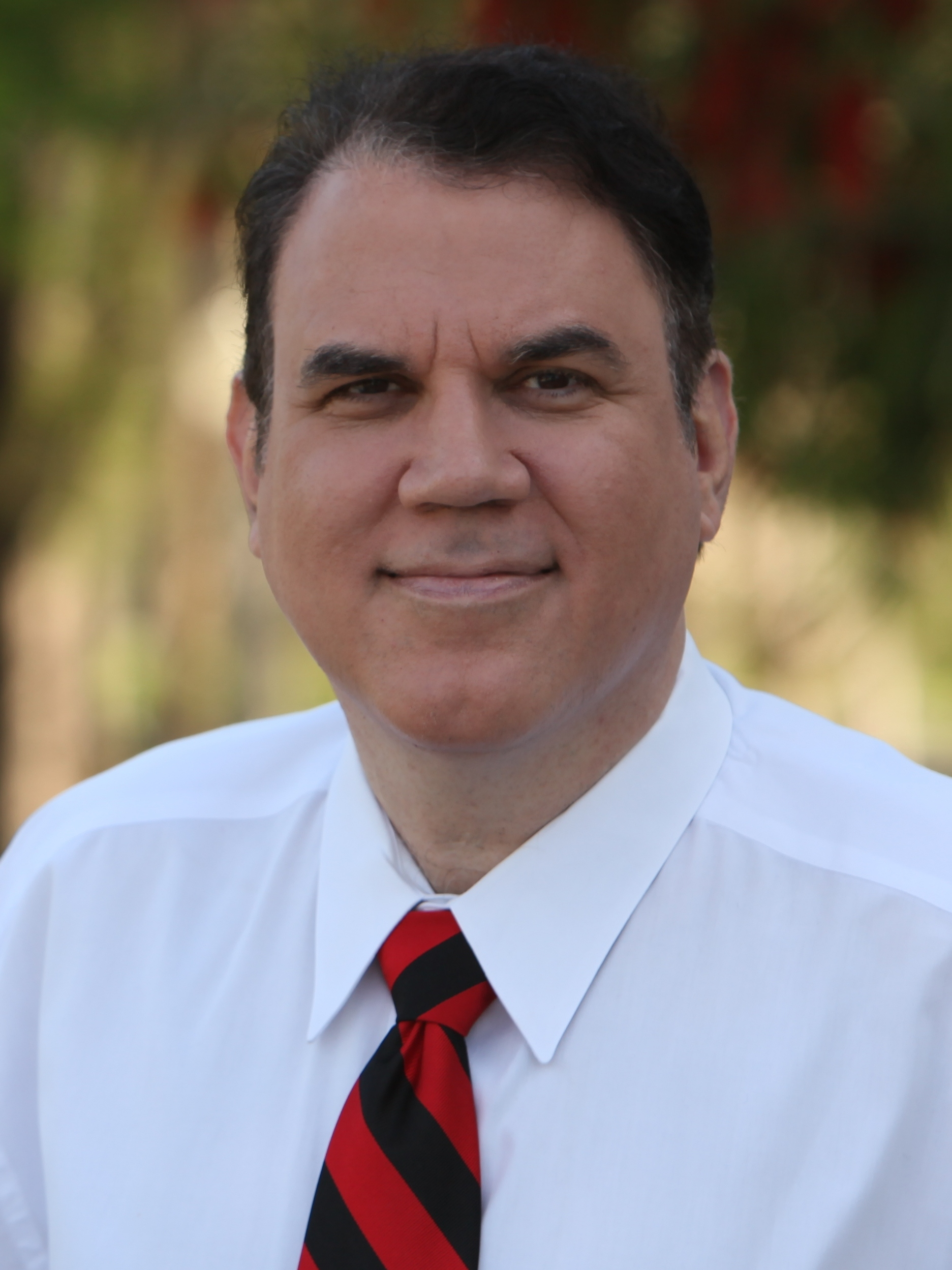

Nominee	Alan Grayson	Todd Long
Party	Democratic	Republican
Popular vote	164,891	98,856
Percentage	62.5%	37.5%
- County results Grayson: 60–70%
U.S. Representative before election
New seat
Elected U.S. Representative
Alan Grayson
Democratic

The new 9th district, an open seat located south of Orlando, was expected to favor Democrats. It contains all of Osceola County, part of Orange County (including the Orlando International Airport), and part of Polk County. The district's inhabitants voted overwhelmingly for President Barack Obama, preferring him to John McCain 60-39%. The new 9th district voting age population was 42.9% non-Hispanic White (single race), 39.1% Hispanic (excludes Hispanic Black), 10.1% non-Hispanic Black (includes multirace), 2.3% Hispanic Black (includes multirace), and 5.6% other races (non-Hispanic).

=== Democratic primary ===
==== Candidates ====
===== Nominee =====
- Alan Grayson, former U.S. representative

=== Republican primary ===
==== Candidates ====
===== Nominee =====
- Todd Long, attorney, conservative radio show host and candidate for the 8th district in 2008 & 2010

===== Eliminated in primary =====
- Julius Melendez
- Mark Oxner, businessman
- John Quinones

==== Primary results ====
Republican primary results
Party	Candidate	Votes	%
Republican	Todd Long	12,585	47.3
Republican	John "Q" Quinones	7,514	28.3
Republican	Julius Anthony Melendez	3,983	15.0
Republican	Mark Oxner	2,510	9.4
Total votes		26,592	100.0

=== General election ===
==== Endorsements ====
Alan Grayson (D)

Labor unions

- AFL-CIO
- International Brotherhood of Boilermakers
- National Association of Letter Carriers

Organizations

- Democracy for America
- Democratic Congressional Campaign Committee "Majority Makers" Program
- Progressive Change Campaign Committee
- Progressive Democrats of America
Todd Long (R)

Organizations

- BIPAC
- National Rifle Association - Political Victory Fund
- Tea Party Express

==== Polling ====
Poll source	Date(s) administered	Sample size	Margin of error	Alan Grayson (D)	Todd Long (R)	Undecided
Gravis Marketing (D-Grayson)	October 11–12, 2012	487	± 4.5%	56%	41%	3%
StPetePolls	October 3–5, 2012	363	± 5.1%	45%	42%	13%
Kitchens (D-Grayson)	September 18–21, 2012	507	± 4.4%	48%	34%	19%
StPetePolls	September 1–3, 2012	629	± 5.0%	46%	41%	13%

==== Predictions ====
Source	Ranking	As of
The Cook Political Report	Likely D (flip)	November 5, 2012
Rothenberg	Safe D (flip)	November 2, 2012
Roll Call	Safe D (flip)	November 17, 2012
Sabato's Crystal Ball	Safe D (flip)	December 12, 2012
NY Times	Lean D (flip)	November 4, 2012
RCP	Likely D (flip)	November 4, 2012
The Hill	Likely D (flip)	November 4, 2012

==== Results ====
Florida's 9th congressional district, 2012
Party	Candidate	Votes	%
Democratic	Alan Grayson	164,891	62.5
Republican	Todd Long	98,856	37.5
Total votes		263,747	100.0
Democratic win (new seat)			

== District 10 ==
2012 Florida's 10th congressional district election
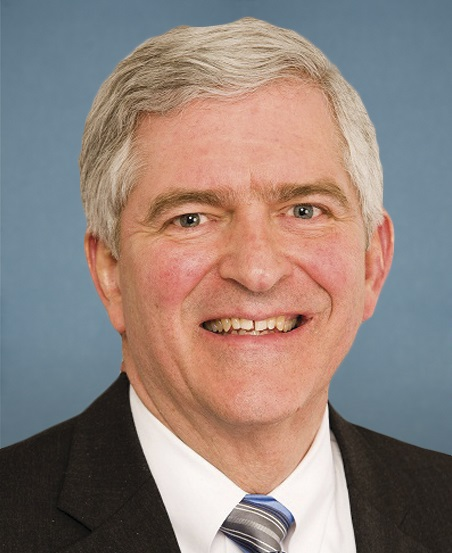

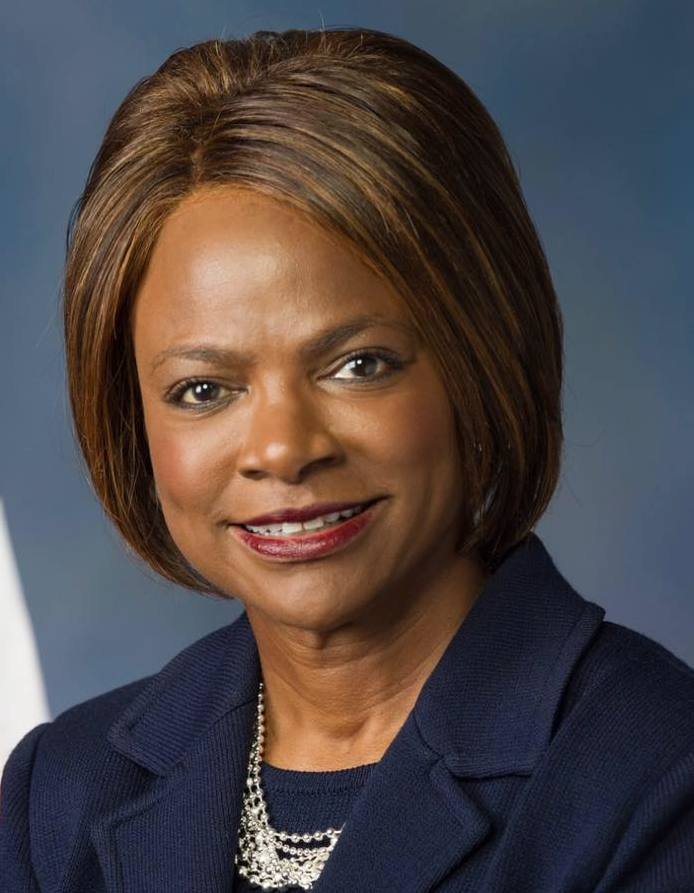
Nominee	Daniel Webster	Val Demings
Party	Republican	Democratic
Popular vote	164,649	153,574
Percentage	51.7%	48.3%
- County results Webster: 50–60% Demings: 50–60%
U.S. Representative before election
Daniel Webster
Republican
Elected U.S. Representative
Daniel Webster
Republican

In redistricting, the 8th district was renumbered as the 10th district. Republican Daniel Webster, who had represented the 8th district since January 2011, sought re-election. The new 10th district voting age population was 69.9% non-Hispanic White (single race), 13.5% Hispanic (excludes Hispanic Black), 10.4% non-Hispanic Black (includes multirace), 0.7% Hispanic Black (includes multirace), and 5.4% other races (non-Hispanic).

=== Republican primary ===
==== Candidates ====
===== Nominee =====
- Daniel Webster, incumbent U.S. representative

=== Democratic primary ===
==== Candidates ====
===== Nominee =====
- Val Demings, former chief of the Orlando Police Department and wife of the Orange County sheriff

===== Declined =====
- Alan Grayson, former U.S. representative

=== General election ===
==== Endorsements ====
Daniel Webster (R)

Organizations

- BIPAC
- Campaign for Working Families
- Eagle Forum
- National Rifle Association - Political Victory Fund
Val Demings (D)

Labor unions

- AFL-CIO
- International Brotherhood of Boilermakers
- National Association of Letter Carriers

Organizations

- Democratic Congressional Campaign Committee "Red to Blue" Program
- EMILY's List

==== Polling ====
Poll source	Date(s) administered	Sample size	Margin of error	Daniel Webster (R)	Val Demings (D)	Undecided
Global Strategy Group (D-DCCC)	October 11–14, 2012	401	± 4.9%	43%	41%	16%
StPetePolls	October 3–5, 2012	498	± 4.4%	51%	40%	9%
Global Strategy Group (D-DCCC)	September 22–25, 2012	402	± %	46%	41%	13%

==== Predictions ====
Source	Ranking	As of
The Cook Political Report	Lean R	November 5, 2012
Rothenberg	Lean R	November 2, 2012
Roll Call	Lean R	November 17, 2012
Sabato's Crystal Ball	Lean R	December 12, 2012
NY Times	Lean R	November 4, 2012
RCP	Lean R	November 4, 2012
The Hill	Tossup	November 4, 2012

==== Results ====
Florida's 10th congressional district, 2012
Party	Candidate	Votes	%
Republican	Daniel Webster (incumbent)	164,649	51.7
Democratic	Val Demings	153,574	48.3
Independent	Naipaul Seegolam (write-in)	46	0.0
Total votes		318,269	100.0
Republican hold			

== District 11 ==
2012 Florida's 11th congressional district election
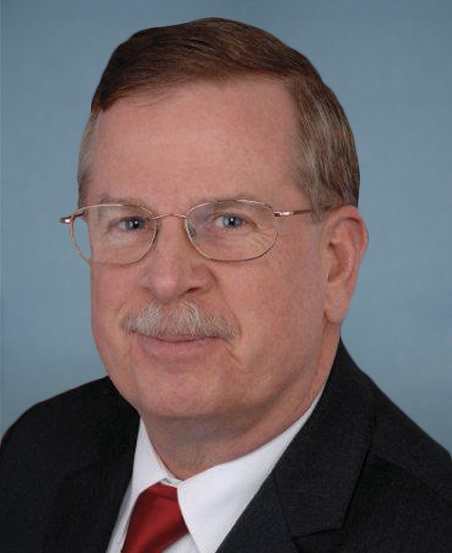

Nominee	Rich Nugent	H. David Werder
Party	Republican	Democratic
Popular vote	218,360	120,303
Percentage	64.5%	35.5%
- County results Nugent: 50–60% 60–70%
U.S. Representative before election
Rich Nugent
Republican
Elected U.S. Representative
Rich Nugent
Republican

In redistricting, most of the old 5th district became the 11th district. Rich Nugent, who had represented the 5th since 2011, ran for re-election in the 11th. The new 11th district voting age population was 83.1% non-Hispanic White (single race), 7.3% non-Hispanic Black (includes multirace), 7% Hispanic (excludes Hispanic Black), 0.4% Hispanic Black (includes multirace), and 2.2% other races (non-Hispanic).

=== Republican primary ===
==== Candidates ====
===== Nominee =====
- Rich Nugent, incumbent U.S. representative

=== Democratic primary ===
==== Candidates ====
===== Nominee =====
- David Werder

=== General election ===
==== Endorsements ====
Rich Nugent (R)

Organizations

- Campaign for Working Families
- National Rifle Association - Political Victory Fund

==== Predictions ====
Source	Ranking	As of
The Cook Political Report	Safe R	November 5, 2012
Rothenberg	Safe R	November 2, 2012
Roll Call	Safe R	November 4, 2012
Sabato's Crystal Ball	Safe R	November 5, 2012
NY Times	Safe R	November 4, 2012
RCP	Safe R	November 4, 2012
The Hill	Safe R	November 4, 2012

==== Results ====
Florida's 11th congressional district, 2012
Party	Candidate	Votes	%
Republican	Rich Nugent (incumbent)	218,360	64.5
Democratic	H. David Werder	120,303	35.5
Total votes		338,663	100.0
Republican hold			

== District 12 ==
2012 Florida's 12th congressional district election
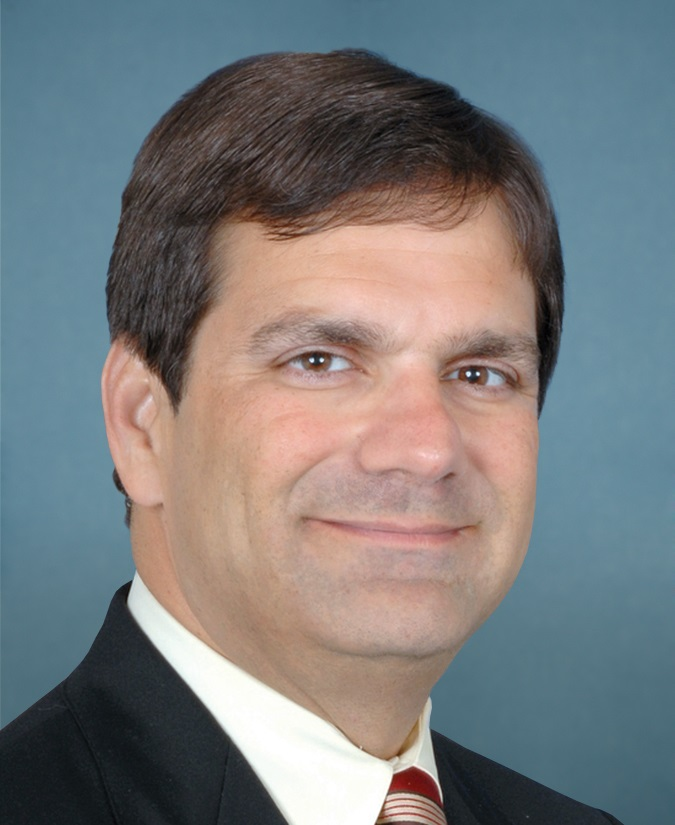

Nominee	Gus Bilirakis	Jonathan Snow
Party	Republican	Democratic
Popular vote	209,604	108,770
Percentage	63.5%	32.9%
- County results Bilirakis : 60–70%
U.S. Representative before election
Gus Bilirakis
Republican
Elected U.S. Representative
Gus Bilirakis
Republican

In redistricting, most of the old 9th district became the 12th district. Republican Gus Bilirakis, who had represented the 9th district since 2007, ran for re-election in the 12th. The new 12th district voting age population was 82.6% non-Hispanic White (single race), 9.6% Hispanic (excludes Hispanic Black), 4% non-Hispanic Blacs (includes multirace), 0.4% Hispanic Black (includes multirace), and 3.5% other races (non-Hispanic).

=== Republican primary ===
==== Candidates ====
===== Nominee =====
- Gus Bilirakis, incumbent U.S. representative

=== Democratic primary ===
==== Candidates ====
===== Nominee =====
- Jonathan Snow, photo specialist and former teacher

=== Independents ===
John Russell, an acute care nurse practitioner, had announced prior to redistricting that he would run as an independent in the 11th district. However, after he was drawn into the 12th, he opted to seek election there.

=== General election ===
==== Endorsements ====
Gus Bilirakis (R)

Organizations

- Campaign for Working Families
- National Rifle Association - Political Victory Fund

==== Polling ====
Poll source	Date(s) administered	Sample size	Margin of error	Gus Bilirakis (R)	Jonathan Snow (D)	Paul Elliott (I)	John Russell (I)	Undecided
StPetePolls	September 1–3, 2012	668	± 5.0%	57%	27%	2%	2%	12%

==== Predictions ====
Source	Ranking	As of
The Cook Political Report	Safe R	November 5, 2012
Rothenberg	Safe R	November 2, 2012
Roll Call	Safe R	November 4, 2012
Sabato's Crystal Ball	Safe R	November 5, 2012
NY Times	Safe R	November 4, 2012
RCP	Safe R	November 4, 2012
The Hill	Safe R	November 4, 2012

==== Results ====
Florida's 12th congressional district, 2012
Party	Candidate	Votes	%
Republican	Gus Bilirakis (incumbent)	209,604	63.5
Democratic	Jonathan Michael Snow	108,770	32.9
Independent	John Russell	6,878	2.1
Independent	Paul Siney Elliott	4,915	1.5
Total votes		330,167	100.0
Republican hold			

== District 13 ==
2012 Florida's 13th congressional district election
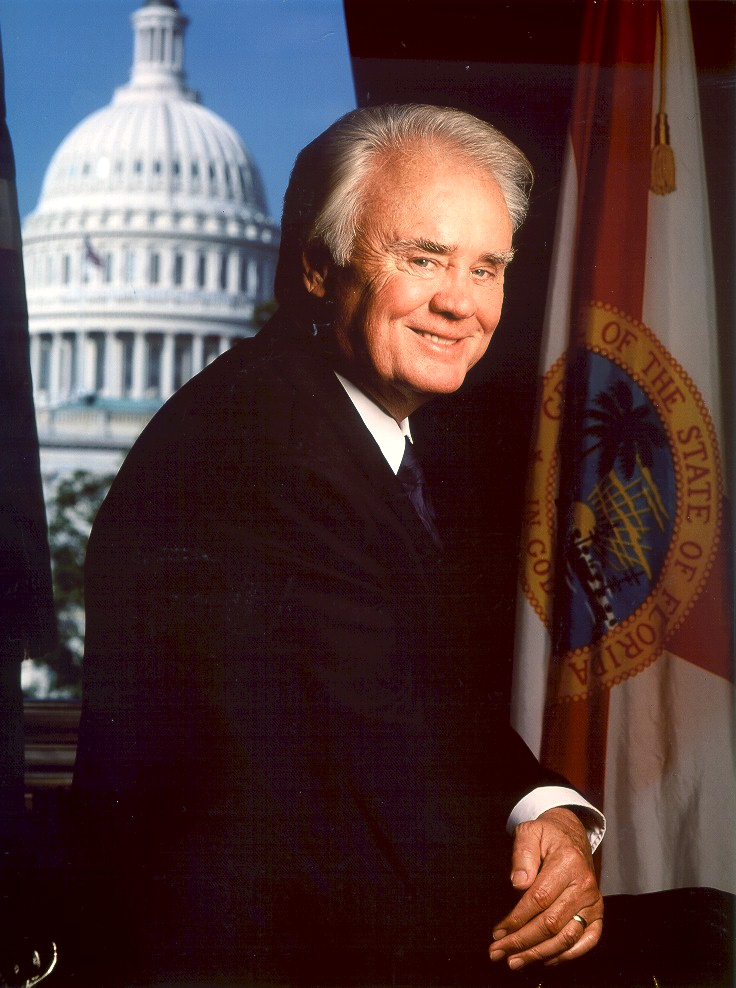

Nominee	Bill Young	Jessica Ehrlich
Party	Republican	Democratic
Popular vote	189,605	139,742
Percentage	57.6%	42.4%
- County results Young: 50–60%
U.S. Representative before election
Bill Young
Republican
Elected U.S. Representative
Bill Young
Republican

In redistricting, most of the old 10th district became the 13th district. Bill Young, who had represented the 10th and its predecessors since 1971, ran for re-election. The new 13th district voting age population was 83.5% non-Hispanic White (single race), 7% Hispanic (excludes Hispanic Black), 5% non-Hispanic Black (includes multirace), 0.3% Hispanic Black (includes multirace), and 4.2% other races (non-Hispanic).

=== Republican primary ===
==== Candidates ====
===== Nominee =====
- Bill Young, incumbent U.S. representative

===== Eliminated in primary =====
- Darren Ayres
- Madeline Vance

==== Primary results ====
Republican primary results
Party	Candidate	Votes	%
Republican	C. W. Bill Young (incumbent)	39,395	69.1
Republican	Darren Ayres	10,548	18.5
Republican	Madeline Vance	7,049	12.4
Total votes		56,992	100.0

=== Democratic primary ===
==== Candidates ====
===== Nominee =====
- Jessica Ehrlich, attorney and former legislative counsel for Representatives Clay Shaw and Stephen Lynch

===== Withdrawn =====
- Nina Hayden

===== Declined =====
- Charlie Justice, former state senator and nominee for this seat in 2010
- Rick Kriseman, state representative
- Janet Long, former state representative
- Kenneth Welch, Pinellas County commissioner

=== Independent ===
==== Declined ====
- Charlie Crist, former governor and candidate for Senate in 2010

=== General election ===
==== Endorsements ====
Bill Young (R)

Organizations

- National Rifle Association - Political Victory Fund
Jessica Ehrlich (D)

Labor unions

- AFL-CIO
- International Brotherhood of Boilermakers

Organizations

- Democratic Congressional Campaign Committee "Emerging Races" Program
- EMILY's List

==== Polling ====
Poll source	Date(s) administered	Sample size	Margin of error	Bill Young (R)	Jessica Ehrlich (D)	Undecided
StPetePolls	October 3–5, 2012	533	± 4.3%	49%	40%	11%
StPetePolls	September 1–3, 2012	1,691	± 5.0%	50%	39%	11%
DCCC (D)	July 18, 2012	800	± 3.5%	49%	35%	16%

==== Predictions ====
Source	Ranking	As of
The Cook Political Report	Safe R	November 5, 2012
Rothenberg	Safe R	November 2, 2012
Roll Call	Safe R	November 17, 2012
Sabato's Crystal Ball	Safe R	December 12, 2012
NY Times	Safe R	November 4, 2012
RCP	Likely R	November 4, 2012
The Hill	Lean R	November 4, 2012

==== Results ====
Florida's 13th congressional district, 2012
Party	Candidate	Votes	%
Republican	Bill Young (incumbent)	189,605	57.6
Democratic	Jessica Ehrlich	139,742	42.4
Total votes		329,347	100.0
Republican hold			

== District 14 ==
2012 Florida's 14th congressional district election
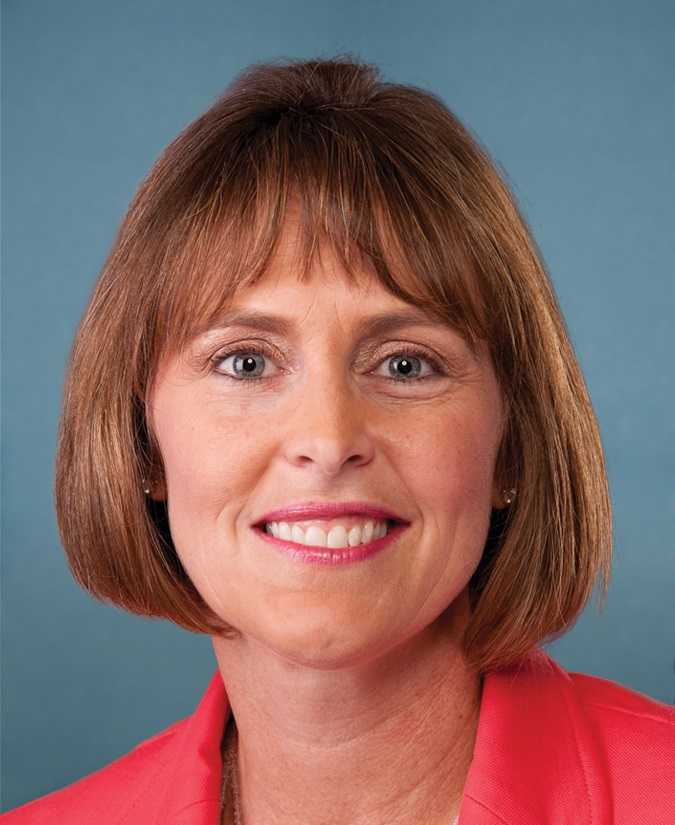

Nominee	Kathy Castor	EJ Otero
Party	Democratic	Republican
Popular vote	197,121	83,480
Percentage	70.2%	29.8%
- County results Castor: 60–70% 80–90%
U.S. Representative before election
Kathy Castor
Democratic
Elected U.S. Representative
Kathy Castor
Democratic

In redistricting, the 11th district was renumbered as the 14th district. Democrat Kathy Castor, who had represented the 11th since 2007, ran for re-election here. Florida's new 14th district voting age population was 46.5% non-Hispanic White (single race), 24% non-Hispanic Black (includes multirace), 24% Hispanic (excludes Hispanic Black), 1.6% Hispanic Black (includes multirace), and 3.8% other races (non-Hispanic).

=== Democratic primary ===
==== Candidates ====
===== Nominee =====
- Kathy Castor, incumbent U.S. representative

=== Republican primary ===
==== Candidates ====
===== Nominee =====
- Evelio Otero, retired Air Force colonel

===== Eliminated in primary =====
- Eddie Adams, architect

===== Declined =====
- Mike Bennett, state senator
- Shawn Harrison, state representative
- Mark Sharpe, Hillsborough County commissioner and nominee for the 11th district in 1994 and 1996

==== Primary results ====
Republican primary results
Party	Candidate	Votes	%
Republican	Evelio "EJ" Otero	12,084	60.3
Republican	Eddie Adams	7,953	39.7
Total votes		20,037	100.0

=== General election ===
==== Endorsements ====
Kathy Castor (D)

Labor unions

- AFL-CIO
- International Brotherhood of Boilermakers
- National Association of Letter Carriers

==== Polling ====
Poll source	Date(s) administered	Sample size	Margin of error	Kathy Castor (D)	EJ Otero (R)	Undecided
StPetePolls	September 1–3, 2012	1,459	± 5.0%	59%	32%	9%

==== Predictions ====
Source	Ranking	As of
The Cook Political Report	Safe D	November 5, 2012
Rothenberg	Safe D	November 2, 2012
Roll Call	Safe D	November 4, 2012
Sabato's Crystal Ball	Safe D	November 5, 2012
NY Times	Safe D	November 4, 2012
RCP	Safe D	November 4, 2012
The Hill	Safe D	November 4, 2012

==== Results ====
Florida's 14th congressional district, 2012
Party	Candidate	Votes	%
Democratic	Kathy Castor (incumbent)	197,121	70.2
Republican	EJ Otero	83,480	29.8
Total votes		280,601	100.0
Democratic hold			

== District 15 ==
2012 Florida's 15th congressional district election
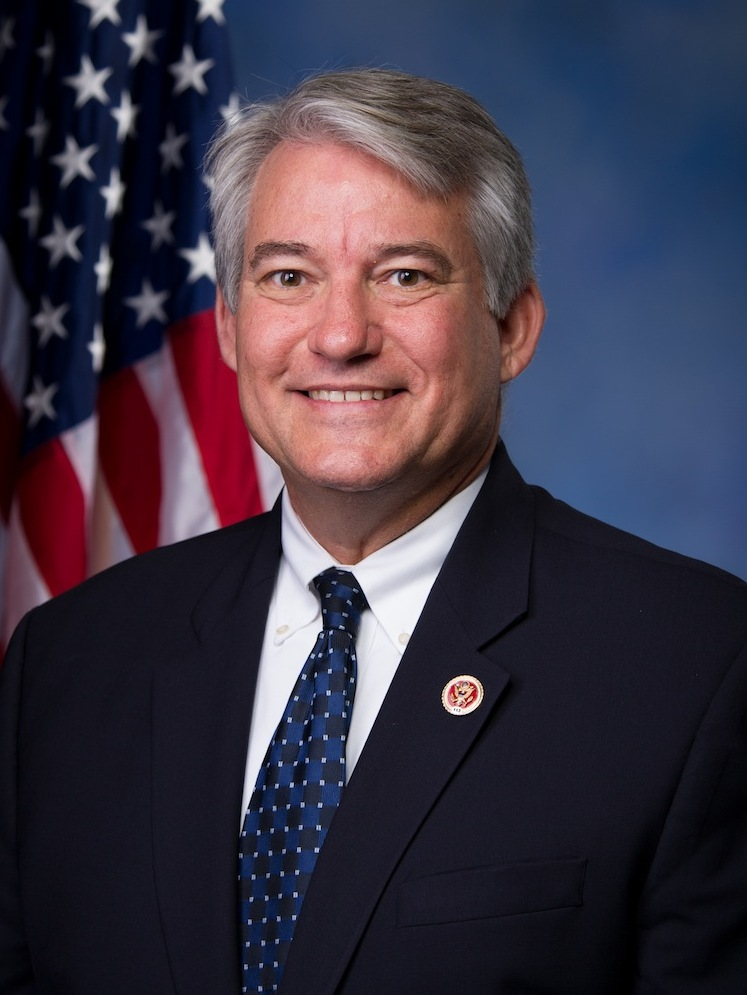
Nominee	Dennis Ross
Party	Republican
Popular vote	Unopposed
U.S. Representative before election
Dennis Ross
Republican
Elected U.S. Representative
Dennis Ross
Republican

In redistricting, the 12th district was renumbered as the 15th district. Dennis Ross, who had represented the 12th district since 2011, ran for re-election. The new 15th district voting age population was 68.6% non-Hispanic White (single race), 14.2% Hispanic (excludes Hispanic Black), 12% non-Hispanic Black (includes multirace), 0.7% Hispanic Black (includes multirace), and 4.5% other races (non-Hispanic).

=== Republican primary ===
==== Candidates ====
===== Nominee =====
- Dennis Ross, incumbent U.S. representative

=== General election ===
No other party put up a candidate.

==== Endorsements ====
Dennis Ross (R)

Organizations

- Campaign for Working Families
- National Rifle Association - Political Victory Fund

==== Predictions ====
Source	Ranking	As of
The Cook Political Report	Safe R	November 5, 2012
Rothenberg	Safe R	November 2, 2012
Roll Call	Safe R	November 4, 2012
Sabato's Crystal Ball	Safe R	November 5, 2012
NY Times	Safe R	November 4, 2012
RCP	Safe R	November 4, 2012
The Hill	Safe R	November 4, 2012

==== Results ====
Florida's 15th congressional district, 2012
Party	Candidate	Votes	%
Republican	Dennis Ross (incumbent)	Unopposed	N/a
Total votes			N/a
Republican hold			

== District 16 ==
2012 Florida's 16th congressional district election
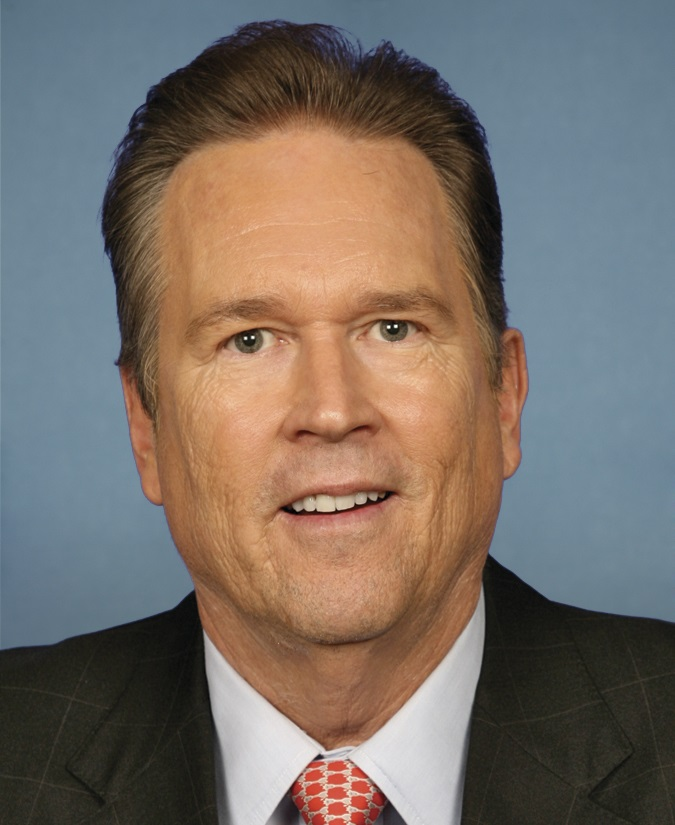

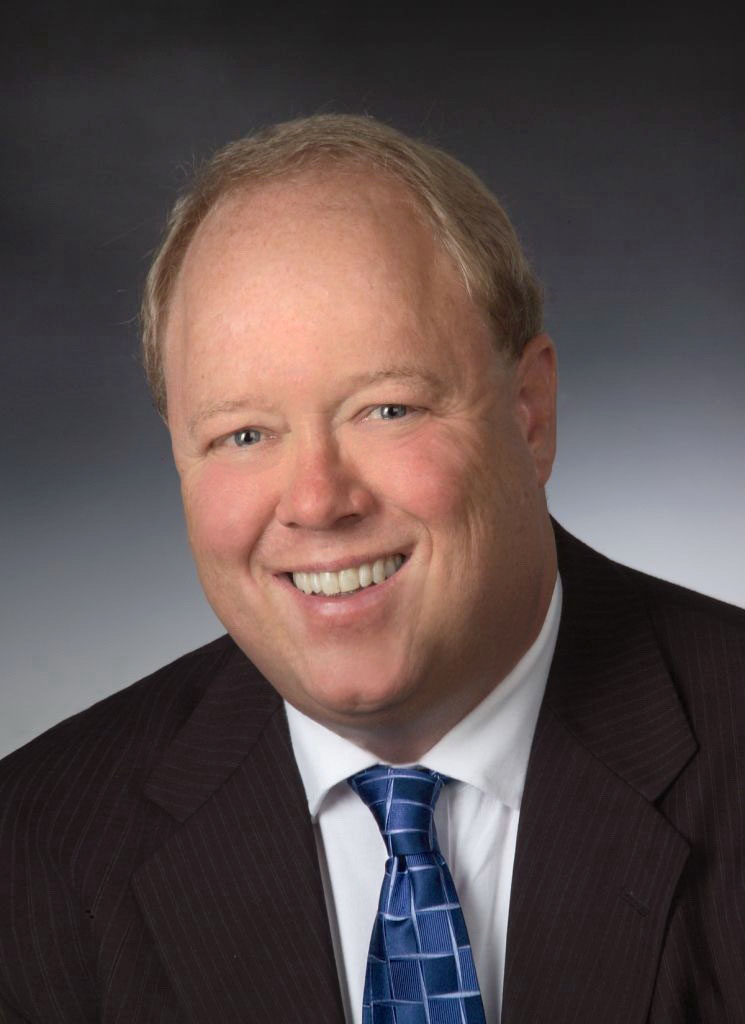
Nominee	Vern Buchanan	Keith Fitzgerald
Party	Republican	Democratic
Popular vote	187,147	161,929
Percentage	53.6%	46.4%
- County results Buchanan: 50–60%
U.S. Representative before election
Vern Buchanan
Republican
Elected U.S. Representative
Vern Buchanan
Republican

In redistricting, the Florida's 13th congressional district was renumbered as the 16th district. Republican Vern Buchanan, who had represented the 13th since 2007, ran for re-election in the 16th after deciding against running for the U.S. Senate. The new 16th district voting age population was 83.5% non-Hispanic White (single race), 8.5% Hispanic (excludes Hispanic Black), 5.6% non-Hispanic Black (includes multirace), 0.3% Hispanic Black (includes multirace), and 2.2% other races (non-Hispanic).

=== Republican primary ===
==== Candidates ====
===== Nominee =====
- Vern Buchanan, incumbent U.S. representative

=== Democratic primary ===
Prior to redistricting, former state representative Keith Fitzgerald had announced he would seek the Democratic nomination to challenge Buchanan.

==== Candidates ====
===== Nominee =====
- Keith Fitzgerald, former state representative

=== General election ===
==== Endorsements ====
Vern Buchanan (R)

Organizations

- National Rifle Association - Political Victory Fund
Keith Fitzgerald (D)

Labor unions

- AFL-CIO
- International Brotherhood of Boilermakers
- National Association of Letter Carriers

Organizations

- Democratic Congressional Campaign Committee "Red to Blue" Program

==== Polling ====
Poll source	Date(s) administered	Sample size	Margin of error	Vern Buchanan (R)	Keith Fitzgerald (D)	Undecided
StPetePolls	October 3–5, 2012	494	± 4.4%	55%	38%	7%
StPetePolls	September 1–3, 2012	897	± 5.0%	56%	37%	7%
Public Policy Polling (D-Fitzgerald)	July 18–19, 2012	586	± 4.1%	44%	36%	19%
Public Opinion Strategies (R-Buchanan)	July 15–16, 2012	500	± 4.9%	54%	32%	14%
Public Opinion Strategies (R-Buchanan)	March 20–21, 2012	400	± 4.9%	58%	36%	6%
SEA Polling (D-Fitzgerald)	February 12–18, 2012	400	± 4.9%	49%	38%	13%

==== Predictions ====
Source	Ranking	As of
The Cook Political Report	Likely R	November 5, 2012
Rothenberg	Likely R	November 2, 2012
Roll Call	Likely R	November 17, 2012
Sabato's Crystal Ball	Likely R	December 12, 2012
NY Times	Lean R	November 4, 2012
RCP	Likely R	November 4, 2012
The Hill	Likely R	November 4, 2012

==== Results ====
Florida's 16th congressional district, 2012
Party	Candidate	Votes	%
Republican	Vern Buchanan (incumbent)	187,147	53.6
Democratic	Keith Fitzgerald	161,929	46.4
Total votes		349,076	100.0
Republican hold			

== District 17 ==
2012 Florida's 17th congressional district election
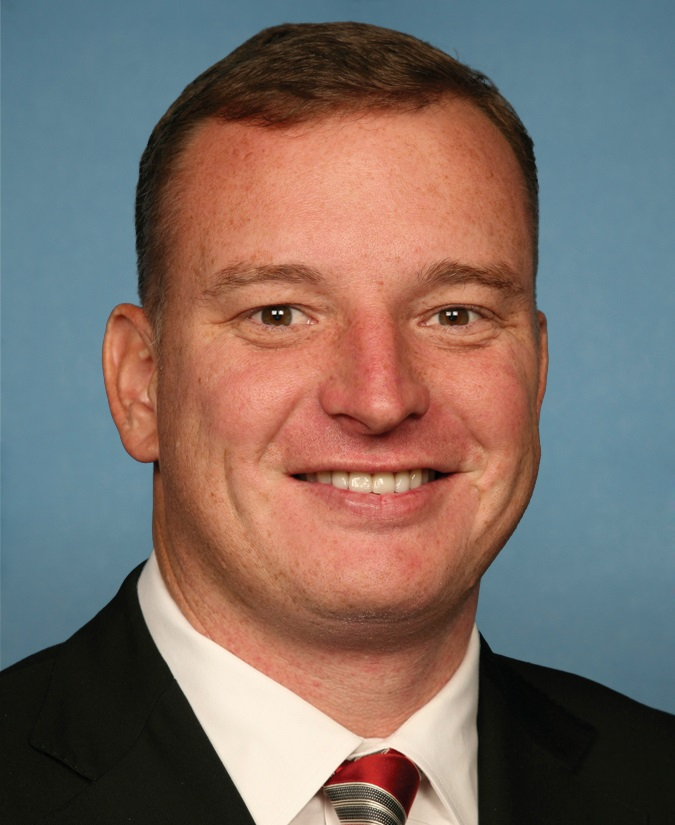

Nominee	Tom Rooney	William Bronson
Party	Republican	Democratic
Popular vote	165,488	116,766
Percentage	58.6%	41.4%
- County results Rooney: 50–60% 60–70% 70–80%
U.S. Representative before election
Tom Rooney
Republican
Elected U.S. Representative
Tom Rooney
Republican

The new 17th district, an open seat for a large district comprising parts of 10 South and Central Florida counties as well as parts of the Everglades watershed, was expected to favor Republicans. Republican Tom Rooney, who had represented the 16th district since 2009, ran for re-election in the new 17th district. The new 17th district voting age population was 75.4% non-Hispanic White (single race), 13.9% Hispanic (excludes Hispanic Black), 7.9% non-Hispanic Black (includes multirace), 0.4% Hispanic Black (includes multirace), and 2.3% other races (non-Hispanic).

=== Republican primary ===
==== Candidates ====
===== Nominee =====
- Tom Rooney, incumbent U.S. representative

===== Eliminated in primary =====
- Joe Arnold, member of Okeechobee County school board

===== Withdrawn =====
- Karen Diebel, former Winter Park city commissioner and candidate for the 24th district in 2010

==== Primary results ====
Republican primary results
Party	Candidate	Votes	%
Republican	Tom Rooney (incumbent)	37,881	73.2
Republican	Joe Arnold	13,871	26.8
Total votes		51,752	100.0

=== Democratic primary ===
==== Candidates ====
===== Nominee =====
- William Bronson, retired Delta Air Lines pilot (formerly an unsuccessful Republican candidate in Massachusetts and Georgia)

=== Minor parties ===
26-year-old Tom Baumann from Miami (who ran unsuccessful campaigns in Minnesota and in the Borough of Manhattan) ran as a write-in candidate for the Socialist Workers Party.

=== General election ===
==== Campaign ====
As of the September FEC financial reporting deadline, Rooney had collected $930,248 in campaign contributions and had $564,716 on hand; the FEC had no reports on Bronson or Baumann.

==== Endorsements ====
Tom Rooney (R)

Organizations

- Campaign for Working Families
- National Rifle Association - Political Victory Fund

==== Predictions ====
Source	Ranking	As of
The Cook Political Report	Safe R	November 5, 2012
Rothenberg	Safe R	November 2, 2012
Roll Call	Safe R	November 4, 2012
Sabato's Crystal Ball	Safe R	November 5, 2012
NY Times	Safe R	November 4, 2012
RCP	Safe R	November 4, 2012
The Hill	Safe R	November 4, 2012

==== Results ====
Florida's 17th congressional district, 2012
Party	Candidate	Votes	%
Republican	Tom Rooney (incumbent)	165,488	58.6
Democratic	William Bronson	116,766	41.4
Socialist Workers	Tom Baumann (write-in)	12	0.0
Total votes		282,266	100.0
Republican win (new seat)			

== District 18 ==
2012 Florida's 18th congressional district election
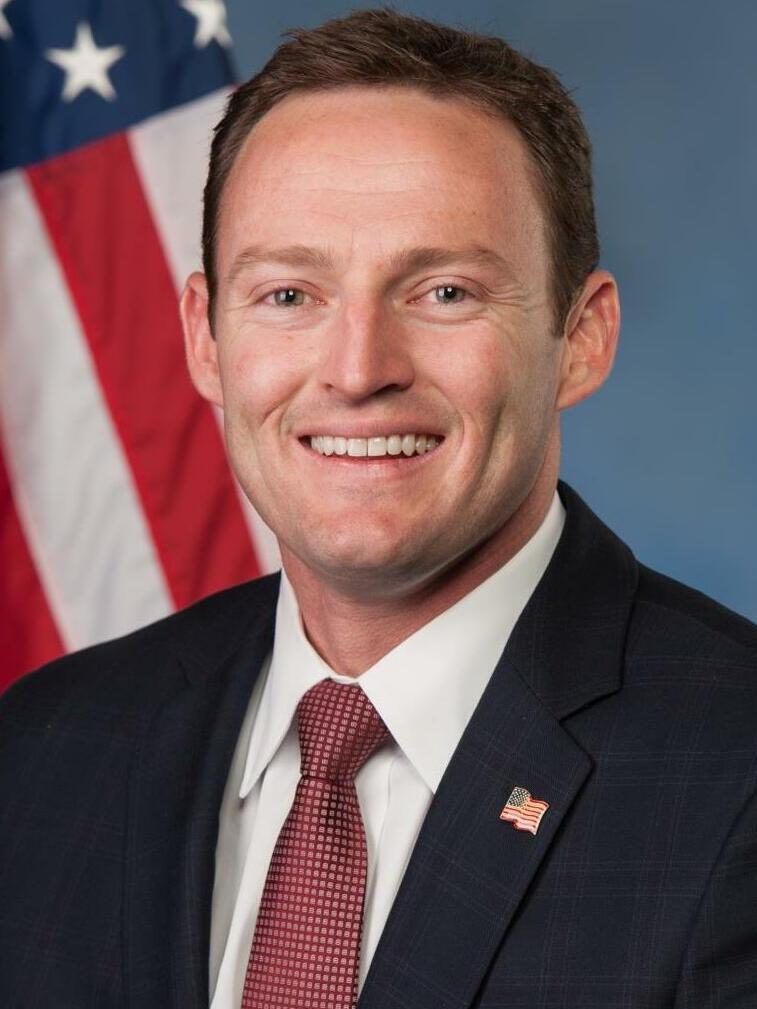

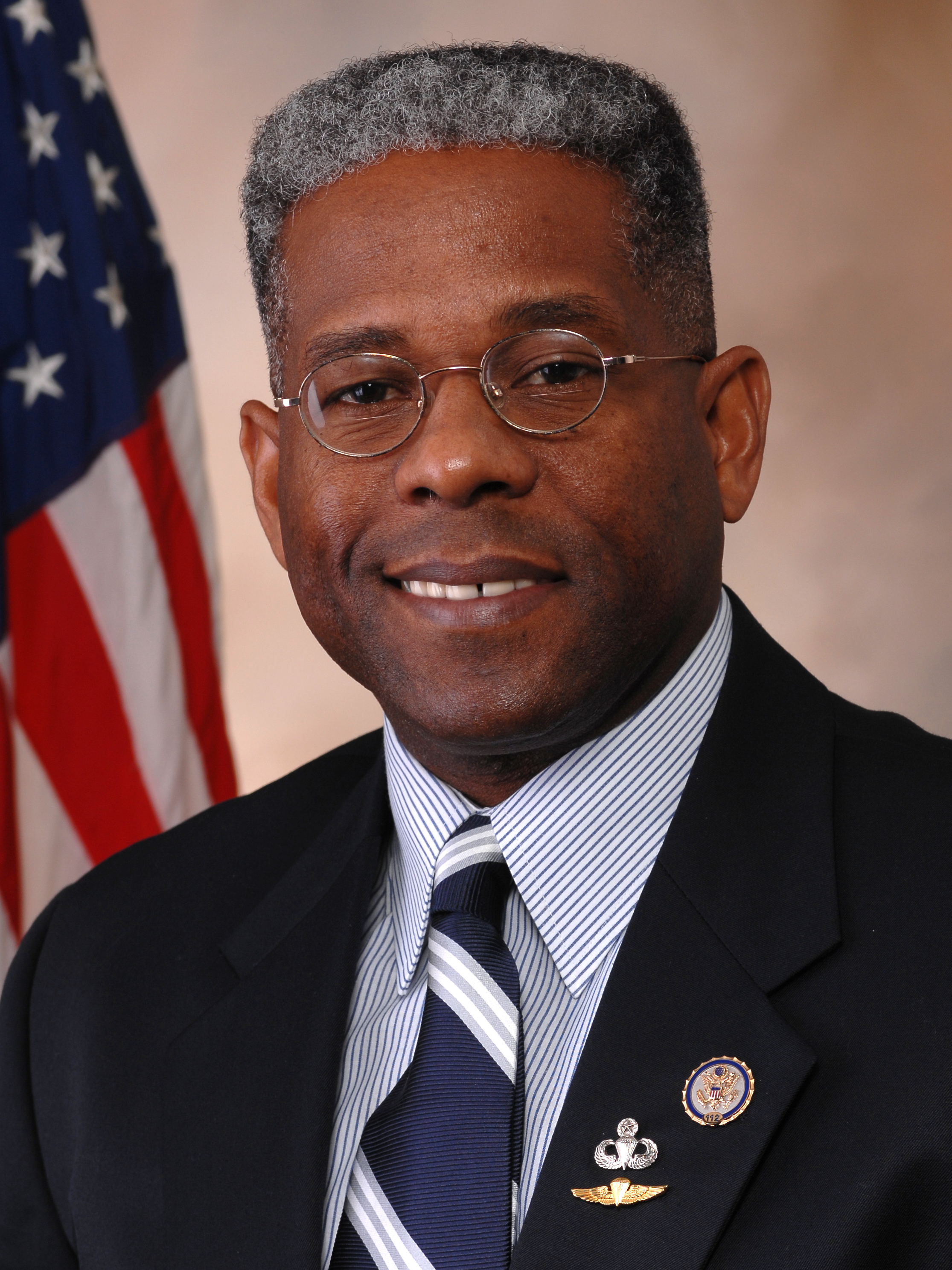
Nominee	Patrick Murphy	Allen West
Party	Democratic	Republican
Popular vote	166,257	164,353
Percentage	50.3%	49.7%
- County results Murphy: 50–60% West: 50–60%
U.S. Representative before election
New seat
Elected U.S. Representative
Patrick Murphy
Democratic

Allen West, who was first elected to represent Florida's 22nd congressional district in 2010, ran for re-election in the new 18th district. The new 18th district voting age population was 74.7% non-Hispanic White (single race), 11.6% Hispanic (excludes Hispanic Black), 10.6% non-Hispanic Black (includes multirace), 0.4% Hispanic Black (includes multirace), and 2.7% other races (non-Hispanic).

=== Republican primary ===
==== Candidates ====
===== Nominee =====
- Allen West, incumbent U.S. representative

===== Eliminated in primary =====
- Robert Crowder, Martin County sheriff

==== Primary results ====
Republican primary results
Party	Candidate	Votes	%
Republican	Allen B. West (incumbent)	45,790	74.4
Republican	Robert L. Crowder	15,758	25.6
Total votes		61,548	100.0

=== Democratic primary ===
Patrick Murphy, an environmental services executive, had planned to seek the Democratic nomination in the 22nd district, but announced in February 2012 that he would continue to challenge West in the 18th district.

==== Candidates ====
===== Nominee =====
- Patrick Murphy, environmental services executive

===== Eliminated in primary =====
- Jerry Buechler
- Jim Horn

==== Primary results ====
Democratic primary results
Party	Candidate	Votes	%
Democratic	Patrick Murphy	26,791	79.7
Democratic	Jim Horn	3,843	11.4
Democratic	Jerry Lee Buechler	2,984	8.9
Total votes		33,618	100.0

=== Independents ===
Marilyn Davis Holloman qualified to run as a write-in. Everett Wilkinson, the chair of the South Florida Tea Party and registered to vote with no party affiliation, decided not to run.

=== General election ===
==== Endorsements ====
Allen West (R)

Organizations

- Campaign for Working Families
- Eagle Forum
- National Republican Congressional Committee "Patriot" Program
- National Rifle Association - Political Victory Fund
Patrick Murphy (D)

Labor unions

- AFL-CIO
- International Brotherhood of Boilermakers
- National Association of Letter Carriers

Organizations

- Democratic Congressional Campaign Committee "Red to Blue" Program

==== Debates ====
- Complete video of debate, October 19, 2012

==== Polling ====
Poll source	Date(s) administered	Sample size	Margin of error	Allen West (R)	Patrick Murphy (D)	Undecided
Public Policy Polling (D)	October 25–26, 2012	631	± ?%	47%	48%	5%
Frederick Polls (D-Murphy)	October 16–17, 2012	333	± 5.3%	47%	47%	6%
Sunshine State News/VSS	October 16–17, 2012	752	± 3.6%	49%	48%	3%
Public Policy Polling (D)	October 15–16, 2012	500	± 4.0%	51%	42%	8%
StPetePolls	October 3–5, 2012	902	± 3.3%	53%	41%	7%
Kimball Political Consulting (R)	September 28, 2012	408	± 4.8%	45%	49%	6%
Garin-Hart-Yang (D-House Majority PAC)	September 26–27, 2012	401	± 4.9%	43%	52%	5%
Public Opinion Strategies (R-West)	September 24–25, 2012	400	± 4.9%	52%	41%	7%
StPetePolls	September 1–3, 2012	535	± 5.0%	49%	43%	9%
Grove Insight (D-DCCC)	August 21–24, 2012	400	± 4.9%	46%	47%	7%
Frederick Polls (D-Murphy)	May 6–8, 2012	500	± 4.3%	45%	45%	10%

==== Predictions ====
Source	Ranking	As of
The Cook Political Report	Tossup	November 5, 2012
Rothenberg	Tilt R	November 2, 2012
Roll Call	Lean R	November 17, 2012
Sabato's Crystal Ball	Lean R	December 12, 2012
NY Times	Tossup	November 4, 2012
RCP	Tossup	November 4, 2012
The Hill	Tossup	November 4, 2012

==== Results ====
Florida's 18th congressional district, 2012
Party	Candidate	Votes	%
Democratic	Patrick Murphy	166,257	50.3
Republican	Allen West (incumbent)	164,353	49.7
Independent	Marilyn Davis Holloman (write-in)	55	0.0
Total votes		330,665	100.0
Democratic gain from Republican			

== District 19 ==
2012 Florida's 19th congressional district election
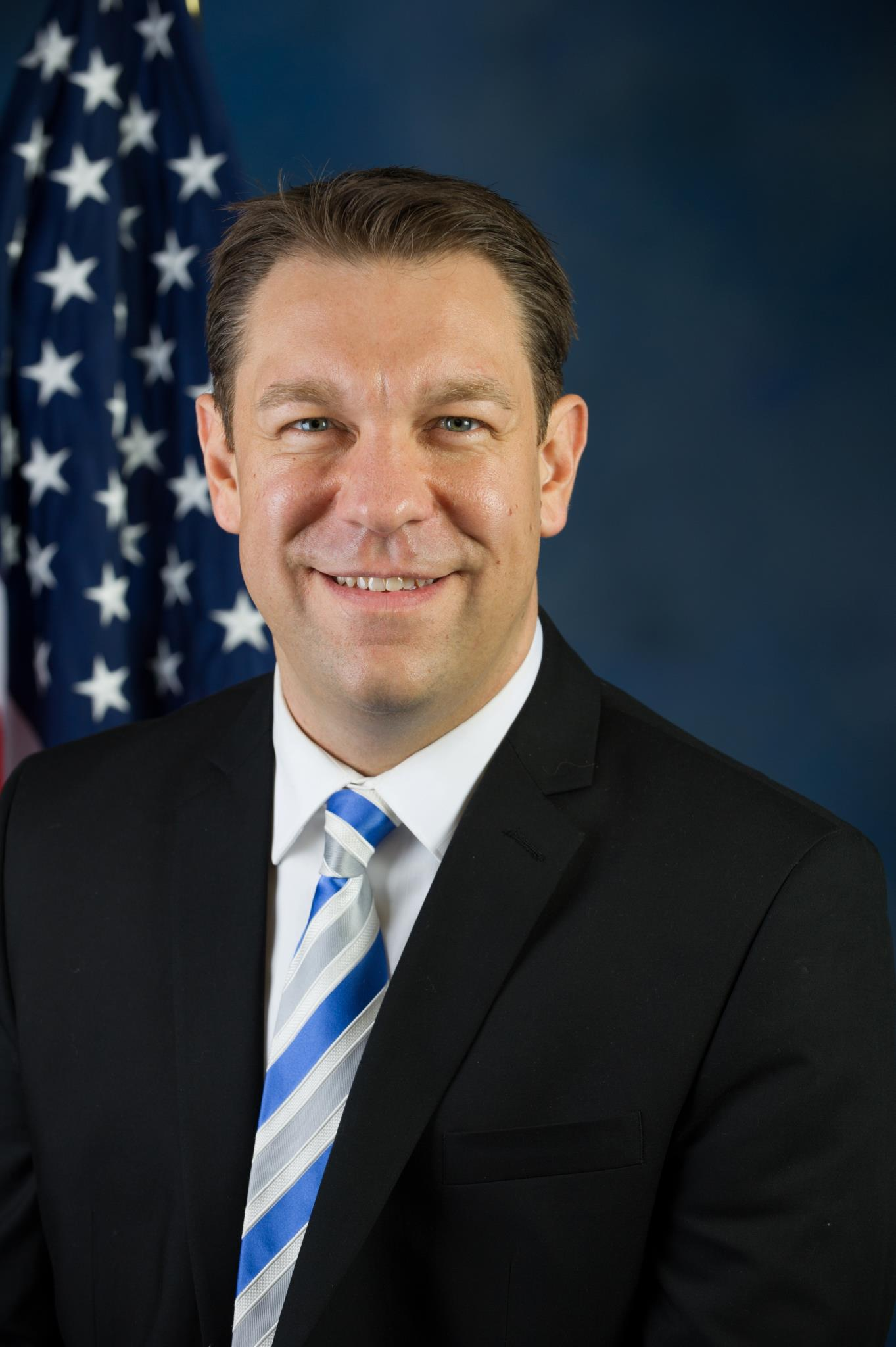

Nominee	Trey Radel	Jim Roach
Party	Republican	Democratic
Popular vote	189,833	109,746
Percentage	62.0%	35.8%
- County results Radel: 50–60% 60–70%
U.S. Representative before election
Connie Mack IV
Republican
Elected U.S. Representative
Trey Radel
Republican

In redistricting, the 14th district was renumbered as the 19th district. Connie Mack IV, who had represented the 14th district since 2005, ran for the U.S. Senate rather than for re-election. The new 19th district voting age population was 77.1% non-Hispanic White (single race), 14.4% Hispanic (excludes Hispanic Black), 6% non-Hispanic Black (includes multirace), 0.5% Hispanic Black (includes multirace), and 2.1% other races (non-Hispanic).

=== Republican primary ===
==== Candidates ====
===== Nominee =====
- Trey Radel, conservative radio talk show host

===== Eliminated in primary =====
- Gary Aubuchon, state representative
- Joe Davidow, attorney
- Byron Donalds, banker
- Chauncey Goss, son of former Director of Central Intelligence Porter Goss
- Paige Kreegel, state representative

===== Withdrawn =====
- Timothy John Rossano

===== Declined =====
- Dudley Goodlette, state representative
- Tom Grady, commissioner of the Florida Office of Financial Regulation
- Tammy Hall, Lee County commissioner
- Ray Judah, Lee County commissioner
- Jeff Kottkamp, former lieutenant governor of Florida
- Ray Price, member of the Naples City Council
- Garrett Richter, state senator
- Burt Saunders, former state senator
- John Sawyer, state representative

==== Primary results ====
Republican primary results
Party	Candidate	Votes	%
Republican	Trey Radel	22,304	30.0
Republican	Chauncey Porter Goss	16,005	21.5
Republican	Paige Kreegel	13,167	17.7
Republican	Gary Aubuchon	11,498	15.5
Republican	Byron Donalds	10,389	14.0
Republican	Joe Davidow	1,028	1.4
Total votes		74,391	100.0

=== Democratic primary ===
==== Candidates ====
===== Nominee =====
- James Roach, retired GM research engineer, decorated Vietnam combat veteran and nominee for the 14th district in 2010

=== Independents ===
Brandon Smith was on the general election ballot as an independent candidate.

=== General election ===
==== Endorsements ====
Trey Radel (R)

Organizations

- National Republican Congressional Committee "Vanguard" Program
- National Rifle Association - Political Victory Fund
Jim Roach (D)

Labor unions

- AFL-CIO
- International Brotherhood of Boilermakers

==== Predictions ====
Source	Ranking	As of
The Cook Political Report	Safe R	November 5, 2012
Rothenberg	Safe R	November 2, 2012
Roll Call	Safe R	November 4, 2012
Sabato's Crystal Ball	Safe R	November 5, 2012
NY Times	Safe R	November 4, 2012
RCP	Safe R	November 4, 2012
The Hill	Safe R	November 4, 2012

==== Results ====
Florida's 19th congressional district, 2012
Party	Candidate	Votes	%
Republican	Trey Radel	189,833	62.0
Democratic	Jim Roach	109,746	35.8
Independent	Brandon M. Smith	6,637	2.2
Total votes		306,216	100.0
Republican hold			

== District 20 ==
2012 Florida's 20th congressional district election
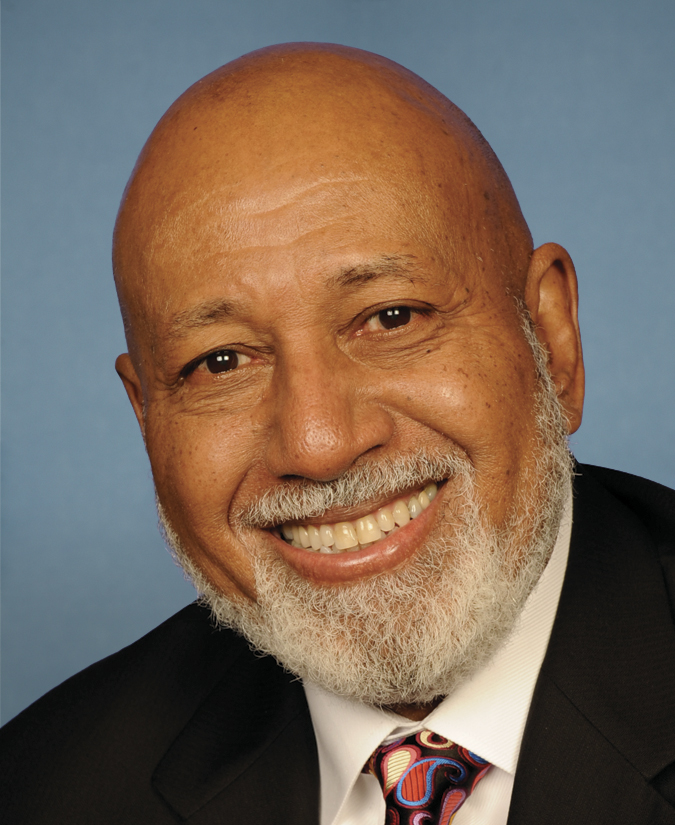

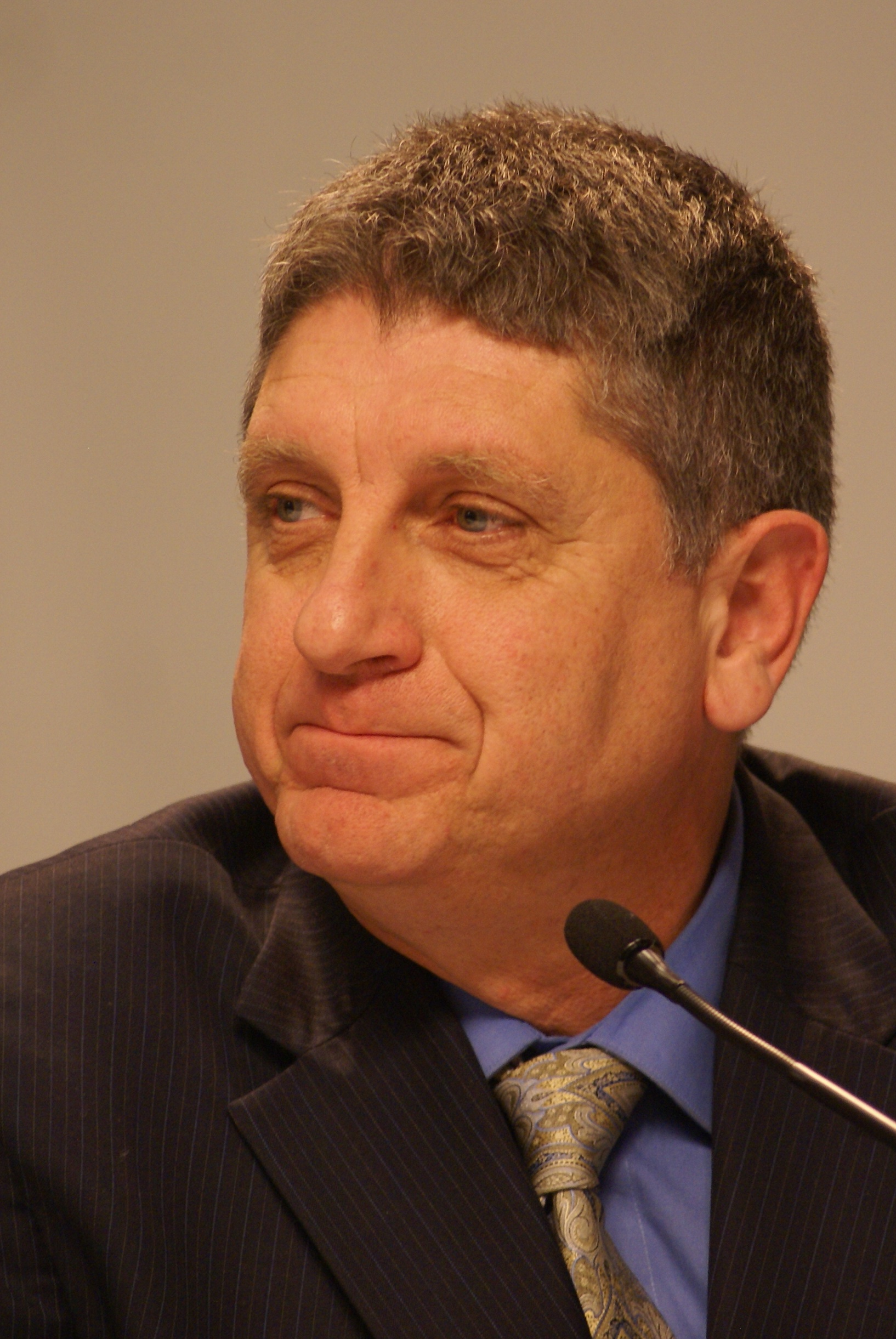
Nominee	Alcee Hastings	Randall Terry
Party	Democratic	Independent
Popular vote	214,727	29,553
Percentage	87.9%	12.1%
- County results Hastings: 70–80% 80–90%
U.S. Representative before election
Alcee Hastings
Democratic
Elected U.S. Representative
Alcee Hastings
Democratic

In redistricting, the 23rd district was renumbered as the 20th district. Democrat Alcee Hastings, who had represented the 23rd since 1993, ran for reelection—in effect, trading district numbers with fellow Democrat Debbie Wasserman Schultz. The new district’s voting-age population was 48.9% black, 29.5% white, and 3.1% other ethnicities (excluding Hispanic). 18.6% were Hispanic, of any race.

=== Democratic primary ===
==== Candidates ====
===== Nominee =====
- Alcee Hastings, incumbent U.S. representative

=== Republican primary ===
==== Candidates ====
===== Withdrawn =====
- Bernard Sansaricq, former president of the Senate of Haiti and nominee for this seat in 2010

=== Independents ===
- Randall Terry, anti-abortion activist

=== General election ===
==== Endorsements ====
Alcee Hastings (D)

Labor unions

- AFL-CIO
- International Brotherhood of Boilermakers
- National Association of Letter Carriers

==== Predictions ====
Source	Ranking	As of
The Cook Political Report	Safe D	November 5, 2012
Rothenberg	Safe D	November 2, 2012
Roll Call	Safe D	November 4, 2012
Sabato's Crystal Ball	Safe D	November 5, 2012
NY Times	Safe D	November 4, 2012
RCP	Safe D	November 4, 2012
The Hill	Safe D	November 4, 2012

==== Results ====
Florida's 20th congressional district, 2012
Party	Candidate	Votes	%
Democratic	Alcee Hastings (incumbent)	214,727	87.9
Independent	Randall Terry	29,553	12.1
Independent	Anthony M. Dutrow (write-in)	5	0.0
Total votes		244,285	100.0
Democratic hold			

== District 21 ==
2012 Florida's 21st congressional district election
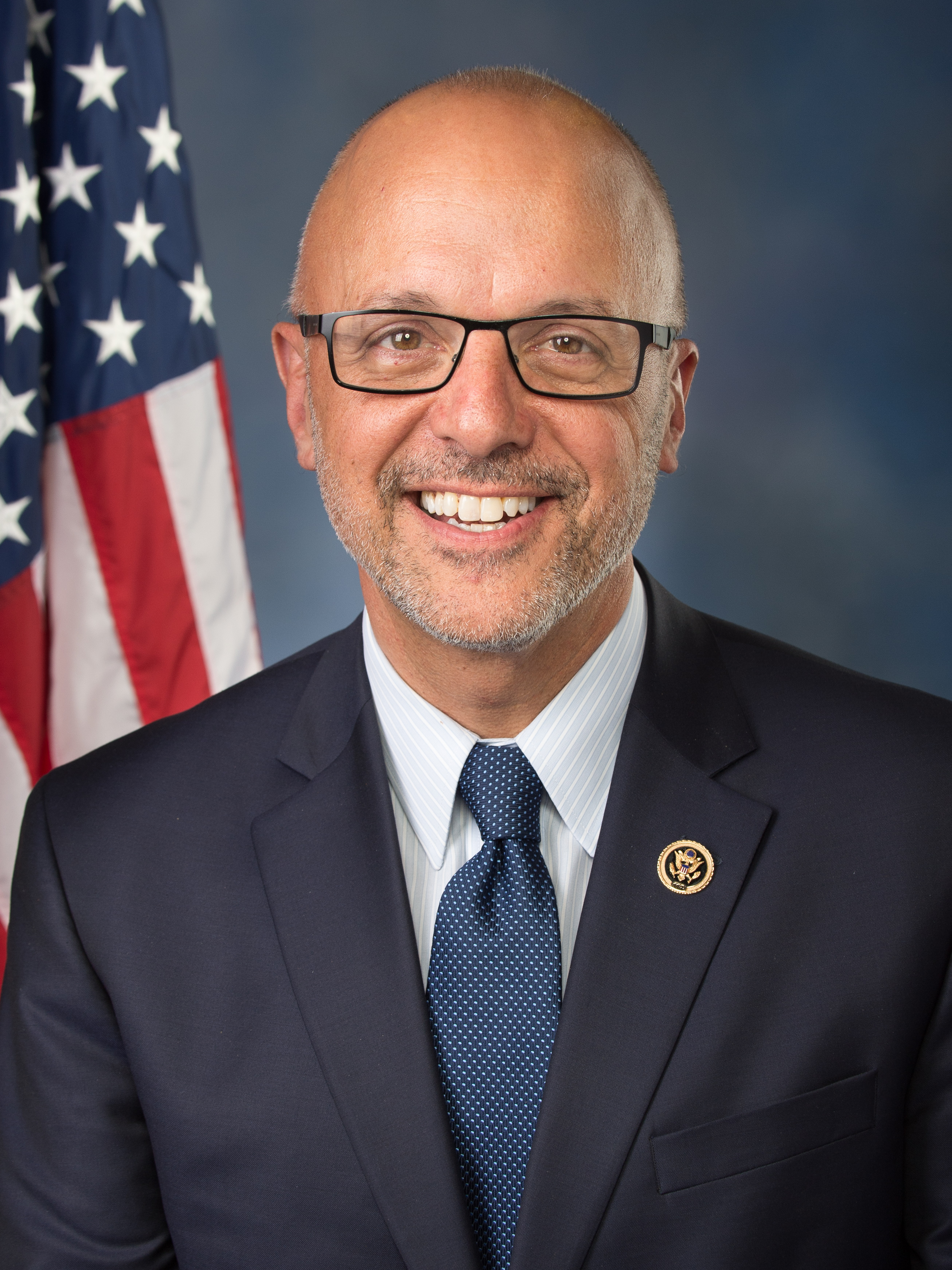

Nominee	Ted Deutch	W. Michael (Mike) Trout	Cesar Henao
Party	Democratic	Independent	Independent
Popular vote	221,263	37,776	25,361
Percentage	77.8%	13.3%	8.9%
- County results Deutch: 70–80%
U.S. Representative before election
Ted Deutch
Democratic
Elected U.S. Representative
Ted Deutch
Democratic

In redistricting, most of the old 19th district became the 21st district. Ted Deutch, who had represented the 19th district since April 2010, ran for re-election The new 21st district voting age population was 66.6% non-Hispanic White (single race), 17.6% Hispanic (excludes Hispanic Black), 10.6% non-Hispanic Black (includes multirace), 0.6% Hispanic Black (includes multirace), and 4.5% other races (non-Hispanic).

=== Democratic primary ===
==== Candidates ====
===== Nominee =====
- Ted Deutch, incumbent U.S. representative

=== Independents ===
Cesar Augusto Henao Cañas was an independent candidate.

=== General election ===
==== Endorsements ====
Ted Deutch (D)

Labor unions

- AFL-CIO

==== Predictions ====
Source	Ranking	As of
The Cook Political Report	Safe D	November 5, 2012
Rothenberg	Safe D	November 2, 2012
Roll Call	Safe D	November 4, 2012
Sabato's Crystal Ball	Safe D	November 5, 2012
NY Times	Safe D	November 4, 2012
RCP	Safe D	November 4, 2012
The Hill	Safe D	November 4, 2012

==== Results ====
Florida's 21st congressional district, 2012
Party	Candidate	Votes	%
Democratic	Ted Deutch (incumbent)	221,263	77.8
Independent	W. Michael (Mike) Trout	37,776	13.3
Independent	Cesar Henao	25,361	8.9
Total votes		284,400	100.0
Democratic hold			

== District 22 ==
2012 Florida's 22nd congressional district election
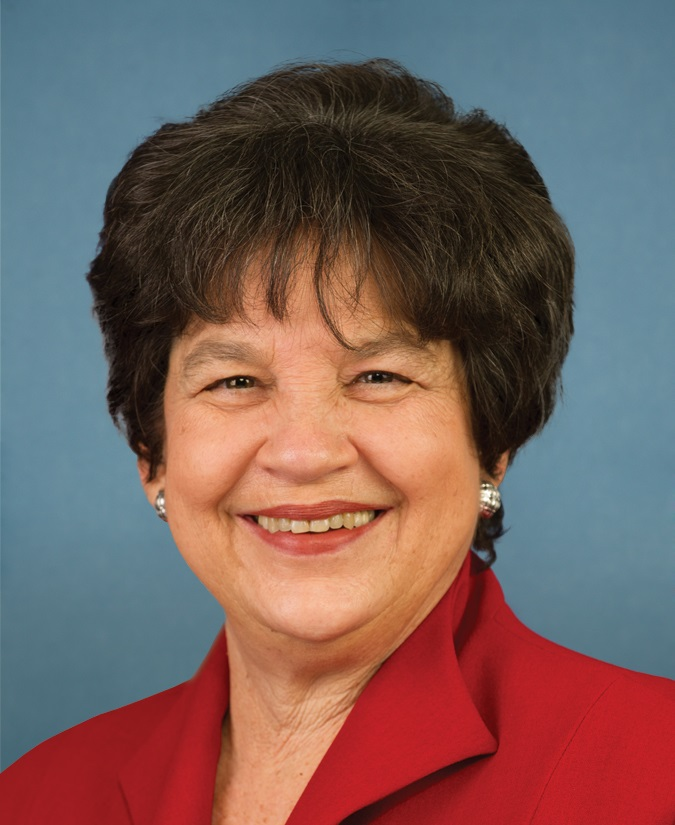

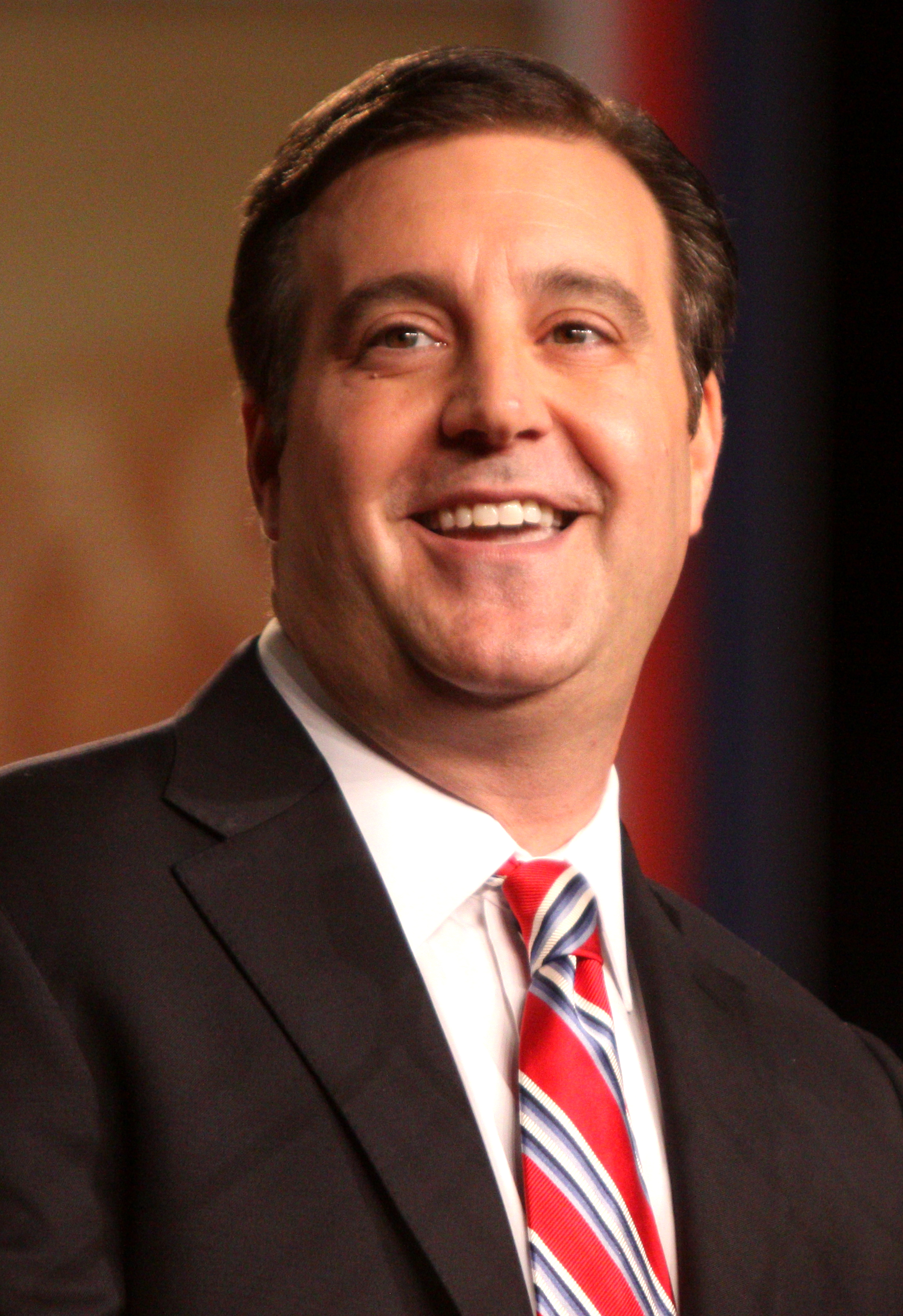
Nominee	Lois Frankel	Adam Hasner
Party	Democratic	Republican
Popular vote	171,021	142,050
Percentage	54.6%	45.4%
- County results Frankel: 50–60%
U.S. Representative before election
Allen West
Republican
Elected U.S. Representative
Lois Frankel
Democratic

Republican Allen West, who was first elected to represent Florida's 22nd congressional district in 2010, sought re-election in the new 18th district. The new 22nd district voting age population was 69.4% non-Hispanic White (single race), 17.2% Hispanic (excludes Hispanic Black), 9.8% non-Hispanic Black (includes multirace), 0.6% Hispanic Black (includes multirace), and 3.1% other races (non-Hispanic).

=== Republican primary ===
==== Candidates ====
===== Nominee =====
- Adam Hasner, former majority leader of the Florida House of Representatives

===== Declined =====
- Chip LaMarca, Broward County commissioner

=== Democratic primary ===
==== Candidates ====
===== Nominee =====
- Lois Frankel, former mayor of West Palm Beach, Florida

===== Eliminated in primary =====
- Kristin Jacobs, Broward County commissioner

===== Declined =====
- John Rodstrom, Broward County commissioner

==== Primary results ====
Democratic primary results
Party	Candidate	Votes	%
Democratic	Lois Frankel	18,483	61.4
Democratic	Kristin Jacobs	11,644	38.6
Total votes		30,127	100.0

=== General election ===
==== Endorsements ====
Adam Hasner (R)

Organizations

- BIPAC
- National Republican Congressional Committee "Young Guns" Program
- National Rifle Association - Political Victory Fund
Lois Frankel (D)

Labor unions

- AFL-CIO
- International Brotherhood of Boilermakers
- National Association of Letter Carriers

Organizations

- Democratic Congressional Campaign Committee "Majority Makers" Program
- EMILY's List
- Progressive Change Campaign Committee

==== Polling ====
Poll source	Date(s) administered	Sample size	Margin of error	Adam Hasner (R)	Lois Frankel (D)	Undecided
Anzalone-Liszt (D-Frankel)	October 18–21, 2012	501	± 4.4%	37%	47%	16%
Public Policy Polling (D)	October 15–16, 2012	500	± 4.4%	44%	47%	9%
Sunshine State News/VSS	October 14–16, 2012	750	± 3.6%	47%	47%	6%
DCCC (D)	October 10, 2012	450	± 4.6%	39%	49%	13%
StPetePolls	October 3–5, 2012	407	± 4.9%	45%	44%	11%
StPetePolls	September 1–3, 2012	1,054	± 5.0%	41%	47%	12%

==== Predictions ====
Source	Ranking	As of
The Cook Political Report	Likely D (flip)	November 5, 2012
Rothenberg	Likely D (flip)	November 2, 2012
Roll Call	Likely D (flip)	November 17, 2012
Sabato's Crystal Ball	Lean D (flip)	December 12, 2012
NY Times	Lean D (flip)	November 4, 2012
RCP	Lean D (flip)	November 4, 2012
The Hill	Tossup	November 4, 2012

==== Results ====
Florida's 22nd congressional district, 2012
Party	Candidate	Votes	%
Democratic	Lois Frankel	171,021	54.6
Republican	Adam Hasner	142,050	45.4
Total votes		313,071	100.0
Democratic gain from Republican			

== District 23 ==
2012 Florida's 23rd congressional district election
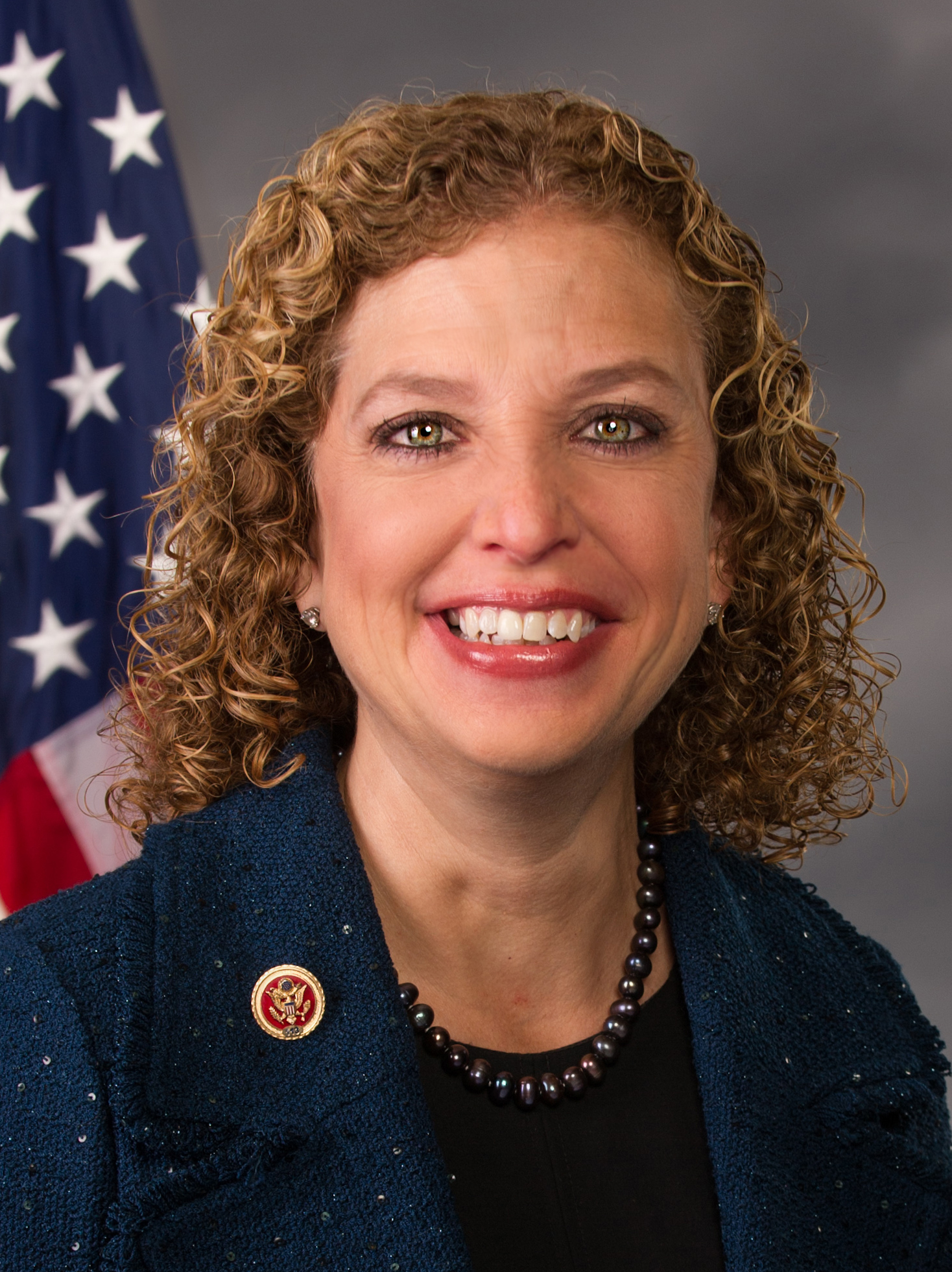

Nominee	Debbie Wasserman Schultz	Karen Harrington
Party	Democratic	Republican
Popular vote	174,205	98,096
Percentage	63.2%	35.6%
- County results Wasserman schultz: 60–70%
U.S. Representative before election
Debbie Wasserman Schultz
Democratic
Elected U.S. Representative
Debbie Wasserman Schultz
Democratic

In redistricting, the 20th district was renumbered as the 23rd district. DNC Chairwoman Debbie Wasserman Schultz, who had represented the 20th since 2005, ran for re-election. The new 23rd district voting age population was 48.9% non-Hispanic Black (includes multirace), 29.5% non-Hispanic White (single race), 17.4% Hispanic (excludes Hispanic Black), 1.2% Hispanic Black (includes multirace), and 3.1% other races (non-Hispanic).

=== Democratic primary ===
==== Candidates ====
===== Nominee =====
- Debbie Wasserman Schultz, incumbent U.S. representative

=== Republican primary ===
==== Candidates ====
===== Nominee =====
- Karen Harrington, businesswoman and nominee for this seat in 2010

===== Eliminated in primary =====
- Gineen Bresso
- Ozzie deFaria, businessman
- Juan Eliel Garcia
- Joseph Kaufman, Americans Against Hate founder

==== Primary results ====
Republican primary results
Party	Candidate	Votes	%
Republican	Karen Harrington	8,043	47.8
Republican	Joe Kaufman	3,383	20.1
Republican	Ozzie deFaria	2,356	14.0
Republican	Juan Eliel Garcia	1,674	9.9
Republican	Gineen Bresso	1,380	8.2
Total votes		16,836	100.0

=== General election ===
==== Endorsements ====
Debbie Wasserman Schultz (D)

Labor unions

- AFL-CIO
- International Brotherhood of Boilermakers
- National Association of Letter Carriers
Karen Harrington (R)

Organizations

- Eagle Forum
- Maggie's List
- Susan B. Anthony List
- Tea Party Express

==== Predictions ====
Source	Ranking	As of
The Cook Political Report	Safe D	November 5, 2012
Rothenberg	Safe D	November 2, 2012
Roll Call	Safe D	November 4, 2012
Sabato's Crystal Ball	Safe D	November 5, 2012
NY Times	Safe D	November 4, 2012
RCP	Safe D	November 4, 2012
The Hill	Safe D	November 4, 2012

==== Results ====
Florida's 23rd congressional district, 2012
Party	Candidate	Votes	%
Democratic	Debbie Wasserman Schultz (incumbent)	174,205	63.2
Republican	Karen Harrington	98,096	35.6
Independent	Ilya Katz	3,129	1.1
Total votes		275,430	100.0
Democratic hold			

== District 24 ==
2012 Florida's 24th congressional district election
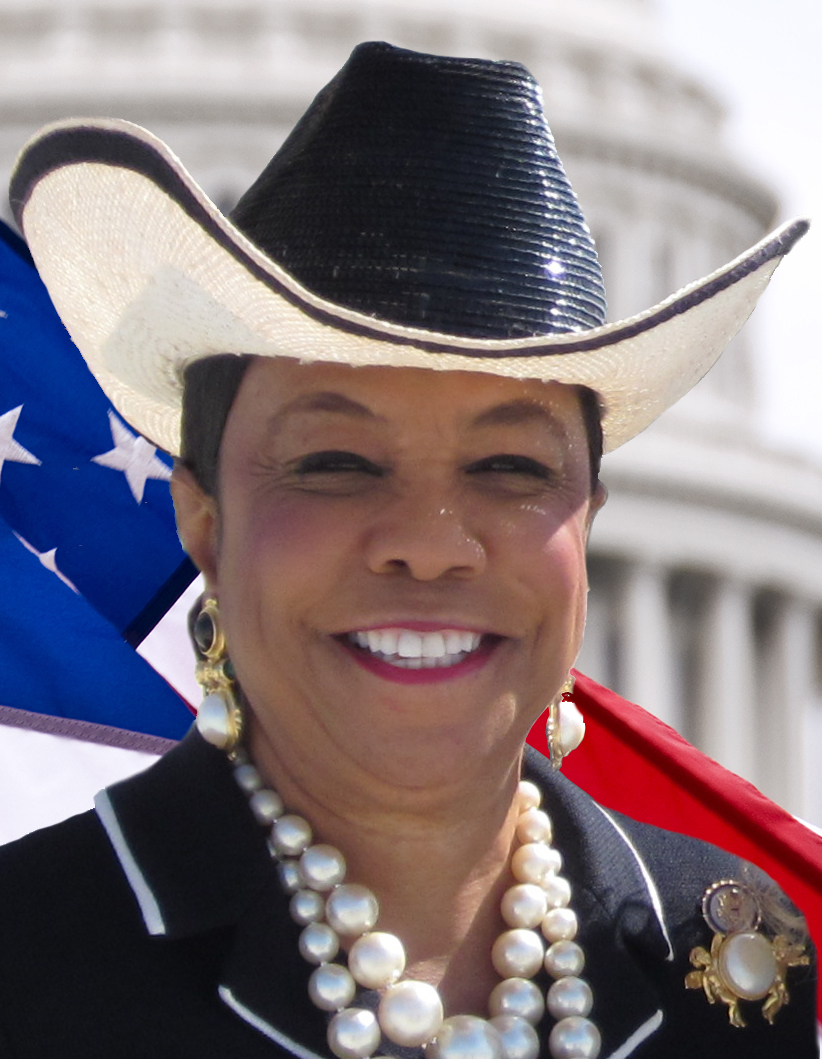
Nominee	Frederica Wilson
Party	Democratic
Popular vote	Unopposed
U.S. Representative before election
Frederica Wilson
Democratic
Elected U.S. Representative
Frederica Wilson
Democratic

In redistricting, most of the old 17th district was renumbered as the 24th district. Democrat Frederica Wilson, who had represented the 17th since 2011, sought reelection. The new 24th district voting age population was 51.7% non-Hispanic Black (includes multirace), 29.9% Hispanic (excludes Hispanic Black), 12.6% non-Hispanic White (single race), 3.2% Hispanic Black (includes multirace), and 2.5% other races (non-Hispanic).

=== Democratic primary ===
==== Candidates ====
===== Nominee =====
- Frederica Wilson, incumbent U.S. representative

===== Eliminated in primary =====
- Rudy Moise, doctor and candidate for this seat in 2010

==== Primary results ====
Democratic primary results
Party	Candidate	Votes	%
Democratic	Frederica Wilson (incumbent)	42,807	66.4
Democratic	Rudolph Moise	21,680	33.6
Total votes		64,487	100.0

=== General election ===
Wilson was unopposed in the general election.

==== Endorsements ====
Frederica Wilson (D)

Labor unions

- AFL-CIO
- International Brotherhood of Boilermakers
- National Association of Letter Carriers

==== Predictions ====
Source	Ranking	As of
The Cook Political Report	Safe D	November 5, 2012
Rothenberg	Safe D	November 2, 2012
Roll Call	Safe D	November 4, 2012
Sabato's Crystal Ball	Safe D	November 5, 2012
NY Times	Safe D	November 4, 2012
RCP	Safe D	November 4, 2012
The Hill	Safe D	November 4, 2012

==== Results ====
Florida's 24th congressional district, 2012
Party	Candidate	Votes	%
Democratic	Frederica Wilson (incumbent)	Unopposed	N/a
Total votes			N/a
Democratic hold			

== District 25 ==
2012 Florida's 25th congressional district election
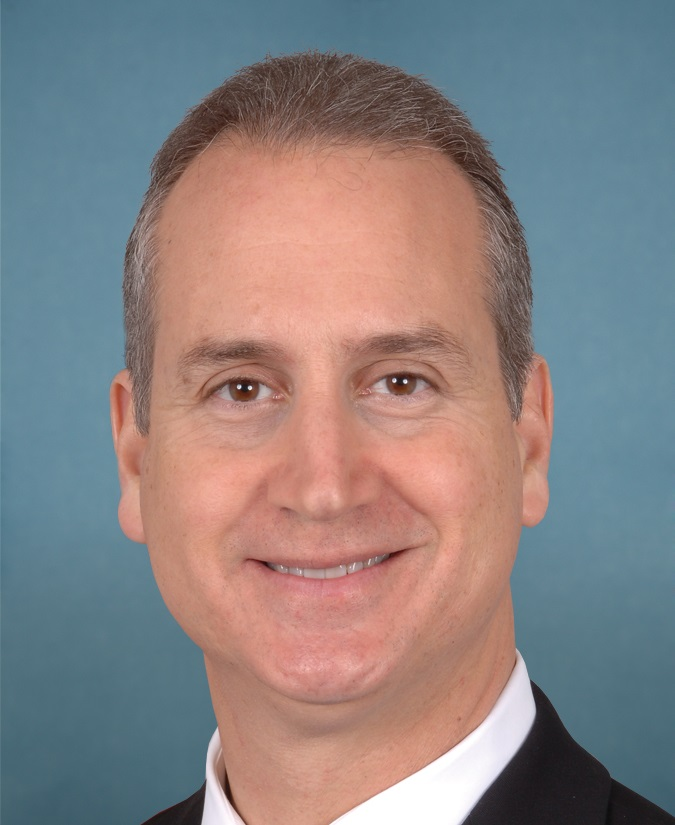

Nominee	Mario Diaz-Balart	Stanley Blumenthal	VoteForEddie.com
Party	Republican	Independent	Independent
Popular vote	151,466	31,664	17,099
Percentage	75.6%	15.8%	8.5%
- County results Diaz-Balart: 60–70% 70–80%
U.S. Representative before election
Mario Diaz-Balart
Republican
Elected U.S. Representative
Mario Diaz-Balart
Republican

In redistricting, the 21st district was renumbered as the 25th district. Republican Mario Diaz-Balart, who had represented the 21st district since 2011, ran for re-election. The new 25th district voting age population was 68.9% Hispanic (excludes Hispanic Black), 21.2% non-Hispanic White (single race), 6% non-Hispanic Black (includes multirace), 1.7% Hispanic Black (includes multirace), and 2.1% other races (non-Hispanic).

=== Republican primary ===
==== Candidates ====
===== Nominee =====
- Mario Diaz-Balart, incumbent U.S. representative

=== General election ===
==== Endorsements ====
Mario Diaz-Balart (R)

Labor unions

- AFL-CIO
- International Brotherhood of Boilermakers

Organizations

- GOProud
- National Rifle Association - Political Victory Fund

==== Predictions ====
Source	Ranking	As of
The Cook Political Report	Safe R	November 5, 2012
Rothenberg	Safe R	November 2, 2012
Roll Call	Safe R	November 4, 2012
Sabato's Crystal Ball	Safe R	November 5, 2012
NY Times	Safe R	November 4, 2012
RCP	Safe R	November 4, 2012
The Hill	Safe R	November 4, 2012

==== Results ====
Florida's 25th congressional district, 2012
Party	Candidate	Votes	%
Republican	Mario Diaz-Balart (incumbent)	151,466	75.6
Independent	Stanley Blumenthal	31,664	15.8
Independent	VoteForEddie.com	17,099	8.5
Total votes		200,229	100.0
Republican hold			

== District 26 ==
2012 Florida's 26th congressional district election
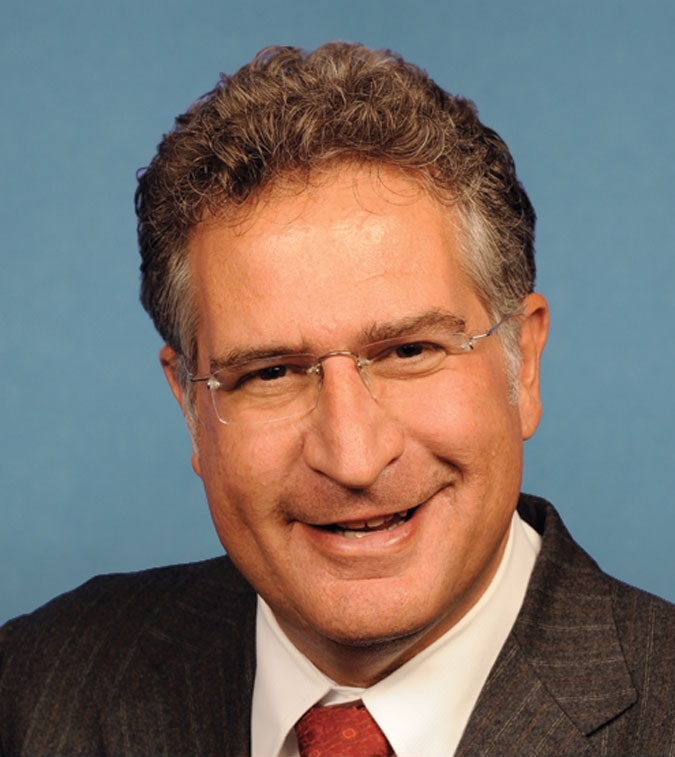

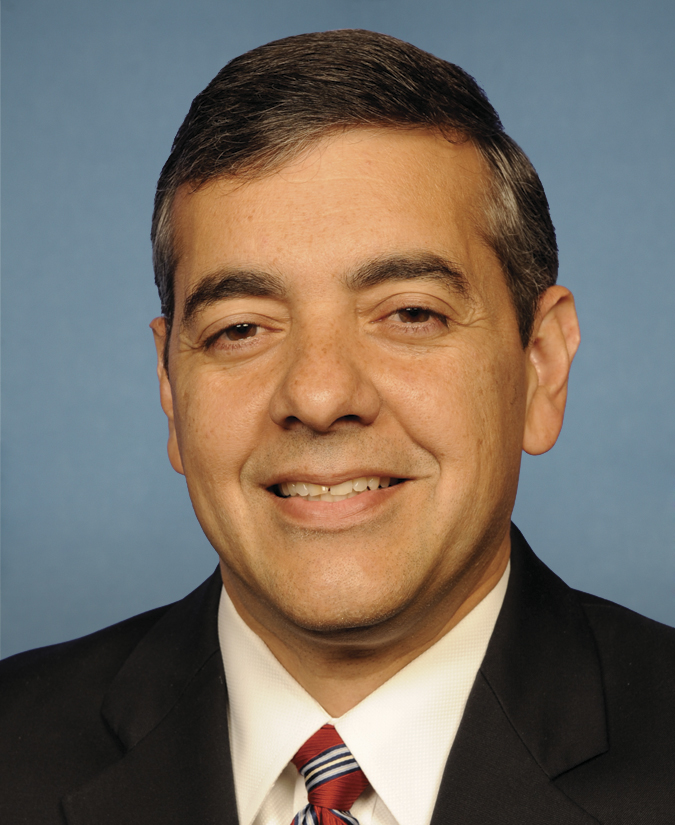
Nominee	Joe Garcia	David Rivera
Party	Democratic	Republican
Popular vote	135,694	108,820
Percentage	53.6%	43.0%
- County results Garcia: 50–60%
U.S. Representative before election
David Rivera
Republican
Elected U.S. Representative
Joe Garcia
Democratic

In redistricting, the old 25th district was renumbered as the 26th district. Republican David Rivera, who had represented the 25th since 2011, ran for reelection. The new 26th district voting age population was 67.4% Hispanic (excludes Hispanic Black), 20.2% non-Hispanic White (single race), 8.6% non-Hispanic Black (includes multirace), 1.5% Hispanic Black (includes multirace), and 2.4% other races (non-Hispanic).

=== Republican primary ===
==== Candidates ====
===== Nominee =====
- David Rivera, incumbent U.S. representative

===== Declined =====
- Carlos Curbelo, political consultant
- Anitere Flores, state senator
- Juan-Carlos Planas, former state representative
- Miguel Diaz de la Portilla, state senator

=== Democratic primary ===
==== Candidates ====
===== Nominee =====
- Joe Garcia, attorney, activist and nominee for this seat in 2010

===== Eliminated in primary =====
- Gustavo Marin, nonprofit consultant, university professor, and political analyst
- Gloria Romero Roses, managing partner at Nexus Homes
- Lamar Sternad, hotel auditor

===== Declined =====
- Luis Garcia, state representative
- Annette Taddeo, businesswoman and nominee for the 18th district in 2008

==== Primary results ====
Democratic primary results
Party	Candidate	Votes	%
Democratic	Joe Garcia	13,927	53.4
Democratic	Gloria Romero Roses	8,027	30.8
Democratic	Lamar Sternad	2,856	10.9
Democratic	Gustavo Marin	1,286	4.9
Total votes		26,096	100.0

=== General election ===
==== Campaign ====
Due to redistricting and constitutional amendments passed in 2010 restricting gerrymandering, the race was considered a toss-up. While the old 25th leaned Republican, the new district was split narrowly in half between Republicans and Democrats.

==== Endorsements ====
David Rivera (R)

Organizations

- National Rifle Association - Political Victory Fund
Joe Garcia (D)

Labor unions

- AFL-CIO
- International Brotherhood of Boilermakers
- National Association of Letter Carriers

Organizations

- Democracy for America
- Democratic Congressional Campaign Committee "Red to Blue" Program

==== Polling ====
Poll source	Date(s) administered	Sample size	Margin of error	David Rivera (R)	Joe Garcia (D)	Angel Fernandez (I)	José Peixoto (I)	Undecided
Benenson (D-DCCC)	October 9–11, 2012	400	± 4.9%	35%	46%	2%	1%	15%
StPetePolls	October 3–5, 2012	473	± 4.5%	43%	41%	2%	3%	12%
NORS (R-Rivera)	September 13–19, 2012	422	± ?%	44%	38%	—	—	19%
Public Policy Polling (D-Democracy for America)	September 12–13, 2012	578	± 4.1%	39%	46%	—	—	16%
GBA Strategies (D-House Majority PAC)/SEIU)	September 8–13, 2012	400	± 4.9%	41%	50%	—	—	9%
Benenson (D-Garcia)	August 20–22, 2012	400	± 4.9%	40%	49%	—	—	11%

==== Predictions ====
Source	Ranking	As of
The Cook Political Report	Lean D (flip)	November 5, 2012
Rothenberg	Lean D (flip)	November 2, 2012
Roll Call	Lean D (flip)	November 17, 2012
Sabato's Crystal Ball	Lean D (flip)	December 12, 2012
NY Times	Tossup	November 4, 2012
RCP	Lean D (flip)	November 4, 2012
The Hill	Likely D (flip)	November 4, 2012

==== Results ====
Florida's 26th congressional district, 2012
Party	Candidate	Votes	%
Democratic	Joe Garcia	135,694	53.6
Republican	David Rivera (incumbent)	108,820	43.0
Independent	Angel Fernandez	5,726	2.3
Independent	José Peixoto	2,717	1.1
Total votes		252,957	100.0
Democratic gain from Republican			

== District 27 ==
2012 Florida's 27th congressional district election
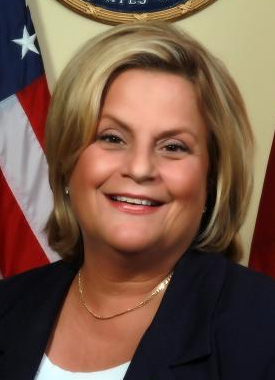

Nominee	Ileana Ros-Lehtinen	Manny Yevancey
Party	Republican	Democratic
Popular vote	138,488	85,020
Percentage	60.2%	36.9%
- County results Ros-lehtinen: 60–70%
U.S. Representative before election
Ileana Ros-Lehtinen
Republican
Elected U.S. Representative
Ileana Ros-Lehtinen
Republican

In redistricting, the old 18th district was renumbered as the 27th district. Republican Ileana Ros-Lehtinen, who had represented the 18th since 1989, ran for re-election. The new 27th district voting age population was 72.8% Hispanic (excludes Hispanic Black), 17.5% non-Hispanic White (single race), 5.5% non-Hispanic Black (includes multirace), 2.2% Hispanic Black (includes multirace), and 2% other races (non-Hispanic).

=== Republican primary ===
==== Candidates ====
===== Nominee =====
- Ileana Ros-Lehtinen, incumbent U.S. representative

=== Democratic primary ===
==== Candidates ====
===== Nominee =====
- Manny Yevancey

===== Withdrawn =====
- Patrick Post

=== General election ===
==== Endorsements ====
Ileana Ros-Lehtinen (R)

Labor unions

- AFL-CIO
- International Brotherhood of Boilermakers

Organizations

- GOProud
- Maggie's List
- National Rifle Association - Political Victory Fund
- Susan B. Anthony List

==== Predictions ====
Source	Ranking	As of
The Cook Political Report	Safe R	November 5, 2012
Rothenberg	Safe R	November 2, 2012
Roll Call	Safe R	November 4, 2012
Sabato's Crystal Ball	Safe R	November 5, 2012
NY Times	Safe R	November 4, 2012
RCP	Safe R	November 4, 2012
The Hill	Safe R	November 4, 2012

==== Results ====
Florida's 27th congressional district, 2012
Party	Candidate	Votes	%
Republican	Ileana Ros-Lehtinen (incumbent)	138,488	60.2
Democratic	Manny Yevancey	85,020	36.9
Independent	Thomas Joe Cruz-Wiggins	6,663	2.9
Total votes		230,171	100.0
Republican hold			
