= 2014 United States House of Representatives elections in Florida =

- November 4, 2014

All 27 Florida seats to the United States House of Representatives
	Majority party	Minority party
Party	Republican	Democratic
Last election	17	10
Seats won	17	10
Seat change	Steady	Steady
Popular vote	2,713,441	2,130,626
Percentage	56.02%	43.98%
Swing	▲4.41%	▼1.69%

Republican
50–60%
60–70%
70–80%
80–90%
90–100%
Democratic
50–60%
60–70%
70–80%
80–90%
90–100%

The 2014 United States House of Representatives elections in Florida were held on Tuesday, November 4, 2014, to elect the 27 U.S. representatives from the state of Florida, one from each of the state's 27 congressional districts. The elections coincided with the elections of other federal and state offices, including Governor of Florida. There was no net party change, as Democrat Gwen Graham defeated Republican incumbent Steve Southerland in the 2nd district, while Republican Carlos Curbelo defeated Democratic incumbent Joe Garcia in the 26th district.

== Overview ==
=== Statewide ===
Party	Candidates	Votes		Seats		
Party	Candidates	No.	%	No.	+/–	%
Republican	26	2,713,451	54.3%	17	Steady	63.0%
Democratic	24	2,130,626	42.6%	10	Steady	37.0%
Independent	9	91,081	1.8%	0	Steady	0.0%
Libertarian	2	61,989	1.2%	0	Steady	0.0%
Write-in	8	1,388	0.0%	0	Steady	0.0%
Total		4,998,555	100.0%	27	Steady	100.0%

Popular vote
Republican	54.28%
Democratic	42.63%
Independent	1.82%
Libertarian	1.24%
Write-in	0.03%

House seats
Republican	62.96%
Democratic	37.04%
Independent	0.00%
Libertarian	0.00%

=== District ===
Results of the 2014 United States House of Representatives elections in Florida by district:

District	Republican		Democratic		Others		Total		Result
District	Votes	%	Votes	%	Votes	%	Votes	%	Result
District 1	165,086	70.15%	54,976	23.36%	15,281	6.49%	235,343	100.00%	Republican hold
District 2	123,262	49.35%	126,096	50.48%	422	0.17%	249,780	100.00%	Democratic gain
District 3	148,691	64.99%	73,910	32.30%	6,208	2.71%	228,809	100.00%	Republican hold
District 4	177,887	78.28%	0	0.00%	49,366	21.72%	227,253	100.00%	Republican hold
District 5	59,237	34.53%	112,340	65.47%	0	0.00	171,577	100.00%	Democratic hold
District 6	166,254	62.54%	99,563	37.46%	0	0.00%	265,817	100.00%	Republican hold
District 7	144,474	63.60%	73,011	32.14%	9,679	4.26%	227,164	100.00%	Republican hold
District 8	180,728	65.84%	93,724	34.14%	61	0.02%	274,513	100.00%	Republican hold
District 9	74,963	43.11%	93,850	53.98%	5,065	2.91%	173,878	100.00%	Democratic hold
District 10	143,128	61.54%	89,426	38.45%	20	0.01%	232,574	100.00%	Republican hold
District 11	181,508	66.66%	90,786	33.34%	0	0.00%	272,294	100.00%	Republican hold
District 12	–	–	–	–	–	–	–	–	Republican hold
District 13	168,172	75.22%	0	0.00%	55,404	24.78%	223,576	100.00%	Republican hold
District 14	–	–	–	–	–	–	–	–	Democratic hold
District 15	128,750	60.28%	84,832	39.72%	0	0.00%	213,582	100.00%	Republican hold
District 16	169,126	61.54%	105,483	38.38%	220	0.08%	274,829	100.00%	Republican hold
District 17	141,493	63.24%	82,263	36.76%	0	0.00%	223,756	100.00%	Republican hold
District 18	101,896	40.22%	151,478	59.78%	0	0.00%	253,374	100.00%	Democratic hold
District 19	159,354	64.55%	80,824	32.74%	6,683	2.71%	246,861	100.00%	Republican hold
District 20	28,968	18.40%	128,498	81.60%	0	0.00%	157,466	100.00%	Democratic hold
District 21	0	0.00%	153,395	99.63%	575	0.37%	153,970	100.00%	Democratic hold
District 22	90,685	41.97%	125,404	58.03%	7	0.00%	216,096	100.00%	Democratic hold
District 23	61,519	37.33%	103,269	62.67%	0	0.00%	164,788	100.00%	Democratic hold
District 24	15,239	10.16%	129,192	86.18%	5,487	3.66%	149,918	100.00%	Democratic hold
District 25	–	–	–	–	–	–	–	–	Republican hold
District 26	83,031	51.46%	78,306	48.54%	0	0.00%	161,337	100.00%	Republican gain
District 27	–	–	–	–	–	–	–	–	Republican hold
Total	2,713,451	54.28%	2,130,626	42.63%	154,478	3.09%	4,998,555	100.00%	

== District 1 ==
2014 Florida's 1st congressional district election
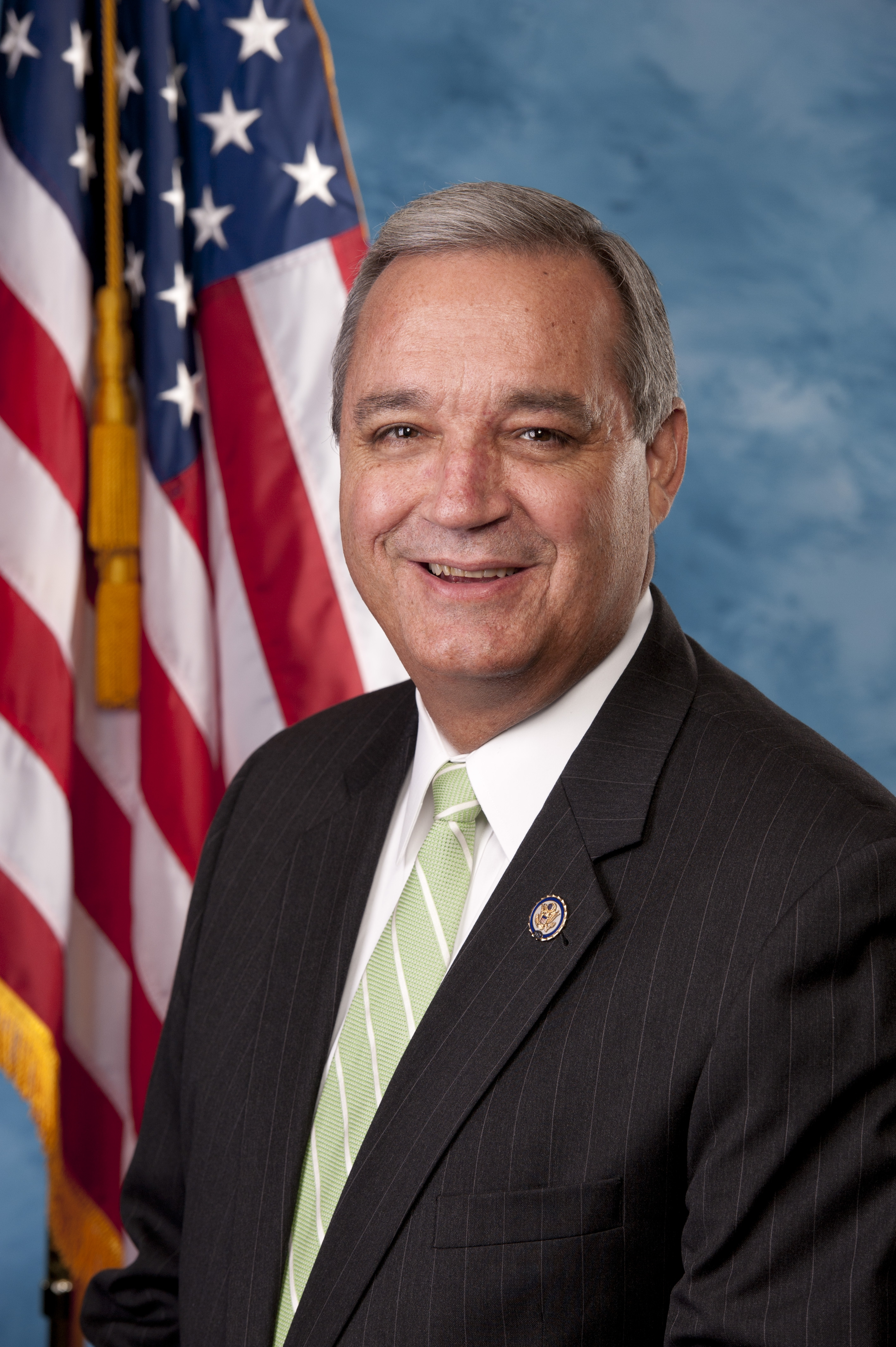

Nominee	Jeff Miller	Jim Bryan	Mark Wichern
Party	Republican	Democratic	Independent
Popular vote	165,086	54,976	15,281
Percentage	70.1%	23.4%	6.5%
- County results Miller: 60–70% 70–80%
U.S. Representative before election
Jeff Miller
Republican
Elected U.S. Representative
Jeff Miller
Republican

Incumbent Republican Jeff Miller, who had represented the district since 2001, ran for re-election.

=== Republican primary ===
==== Candidates ====
===== Nominee =====
- Jeff Miller, incumbent U.S. Representative

===== Eliminated in primary =====
- John Krause

===== Withdrawn =====
- Travis Pierce Miller

==== Results ====
Republican primary results
Party	Candidate	Votes	%
Republican	Jeff Miller (incumbent)	44,784	75.3
Republican	John E Krause	14,660	24.7
Total votes		59,444	100.0

=== Democratic primary ===
==== Candidates ====
===== Nominee =====
- Jim Bryan, retired Army officer and nominee for this seat in 2010

=== General election ===
==== Predictions ====
Source	Ranking	As of
The Cook Political Report	Safe R	November 3, 2014
Rothenberg	Safe R	October 24, 2014
Sabato's Crystal Ball	Safe R	October 30, 2014
RCP	Safe R	November 2, 2014
Daily Kos Elections	Safe R	November 4, 2014

==== Results ====
Florida's 1st congressional district, 2014
Party	Candidate	Votes	%
Republican	Jeff Miller (incumbent)	165,086	70.1
Democratic	Jim Bryan	54,976	23.4
Independent	Mark Wichern	15,281	6.5
Total votes		235,343	100.0
Republican hold			

== District 2 ==
2014 Florida's 2nd congressional district election
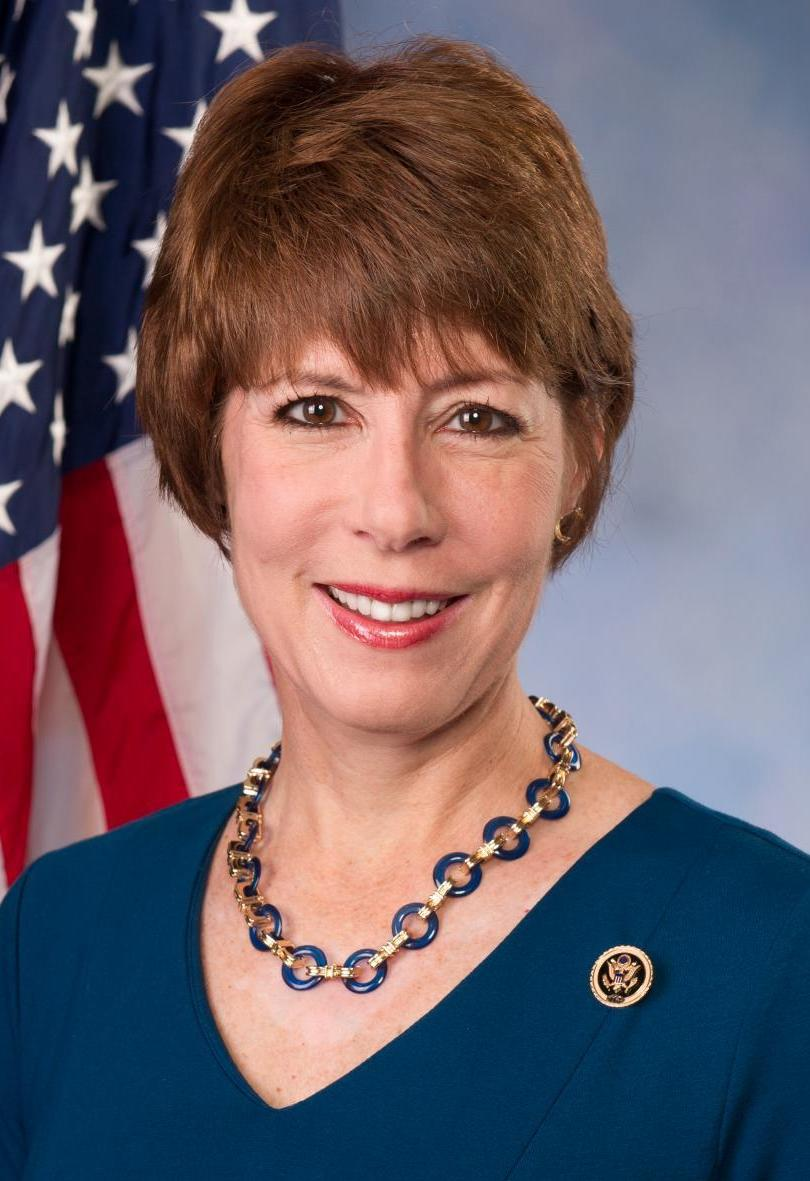

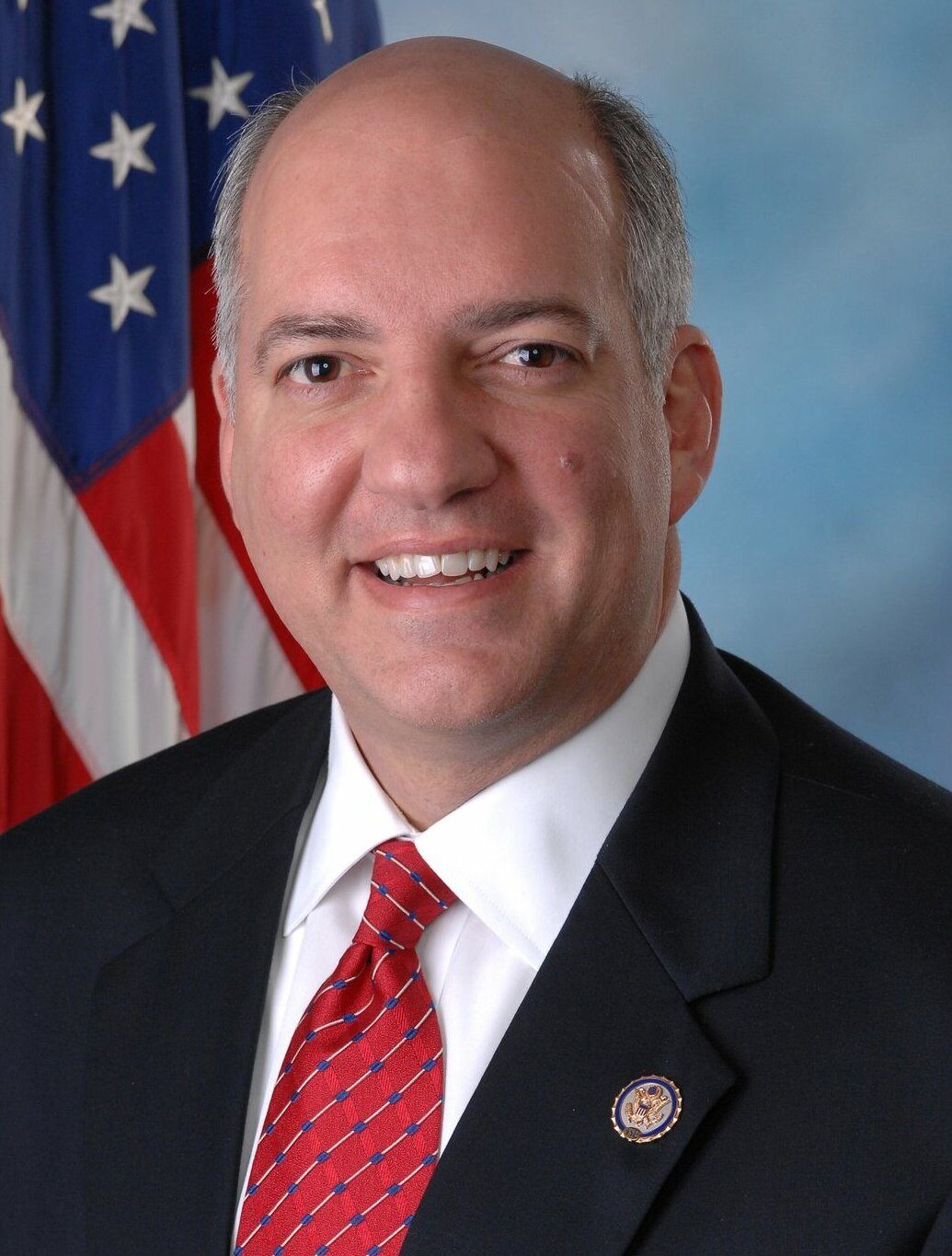
Nominee	Gwen Graham	Steve Southerland
Party	Democratic	Republican
Popular vote	126,096	123,262
Percentage	50.5%	49.3%
- County results Graham: 50–60% 60–70% 70–80% Southerland: 50–60% 60–70% 70–80%
U.S. Representative before election
Steve Southerland
Republican
Elected U.S. Representative
Gwen Graham
Democratic

Incumbent Republican Steve Southerland, who had represented the district since 2011, ran for re-election.

=== Republican primary ===
==== Candidates ====
===== Nominee =====
- Steve Southerland, incumbent U.S. Representative

=== Democratic primary ===
==== Candidates ====
===== Nominee =====
- Gwen Graham, Leon County school administrator and the daughter of Bob Graham, former United States Senator and Governor of Florida

=== General election ===
==== Endorsements ====
Steve Southerland (R)

Organizations

- National Republican Congressional Committee "Patriot" Program
- Susan B. Anthony List
Gwen Graham (D)

Labor unions

- AFL-CIO
- International Brotherhood of Boilermakers
- National Association of Letter Carriers

Organizations

- Blue Dog Coalition
- Democratic Congressional Campaign Committee "Red to Blue" Program
- EMILY's List

==== Polling ====
Poll source	Date(s) administered	Sample size	Margin of error	Steve Southerland (R)	Gwen Graham (D)	Undecided
National Research Group (R-Southerland)	October 1–2, 2014	400	± 4.9%	45%	39%	16%
Anzalone Liszt Grove (D-Graham)	September 21–24, 2014	500	± 4.4%	45%	48%	7%
Pathfinder Opinion Research	August 11–12, 2014	400	± 4.4%	43%	45%	11%
Pathfinder Opinion Research	April 22–24, 2014	500	± 4.4%	49%	39%	11%
Anzalone Liszt Grove (D-Graham)	March 2–6, 2014	500	± 4.4%	42%	40%	18%
Public Policy Polling	October 21–22, 2013	965	± 3.2%	41%	44%	15%
Clarity Campaign Labs	August 27–28, 2013	1,152	± 2.9%	44%	42%	14%

==== Predictions ====
Source	Ranking	As of
The Cook Political Report	Tossup	November 3, 2014
Rothenberg	Tossup	October 24, 2014
Sabato's Crystal Ball	Lean D (flip)	October 30, 2014
RCP	Tossup	November 2, 2014
Daily Kos Elections	Tossup	November 4, 2014

==== Results ====
Graham won the race by a narrow 1.2% margin, or over 2,800 votes, making Southerland one of only two sitting Republicans to be defeated by a Democrat in 2014 (the other being Lee Terry in Nebraska's 2nd).

Florida's 2nd congressional district, 2014
Party	Candidate	Votes	%
Democratic	Gwen Graham	126,096	50.5
Republican	Steve Southerland (incumbent)	123,262	49.3
Write-in	Luther Lee	422	0.2
Total votes		249,780	100.0
Democratic gain from Republican			

== District 3 ==
2014 Florida's 3rd congressional district election
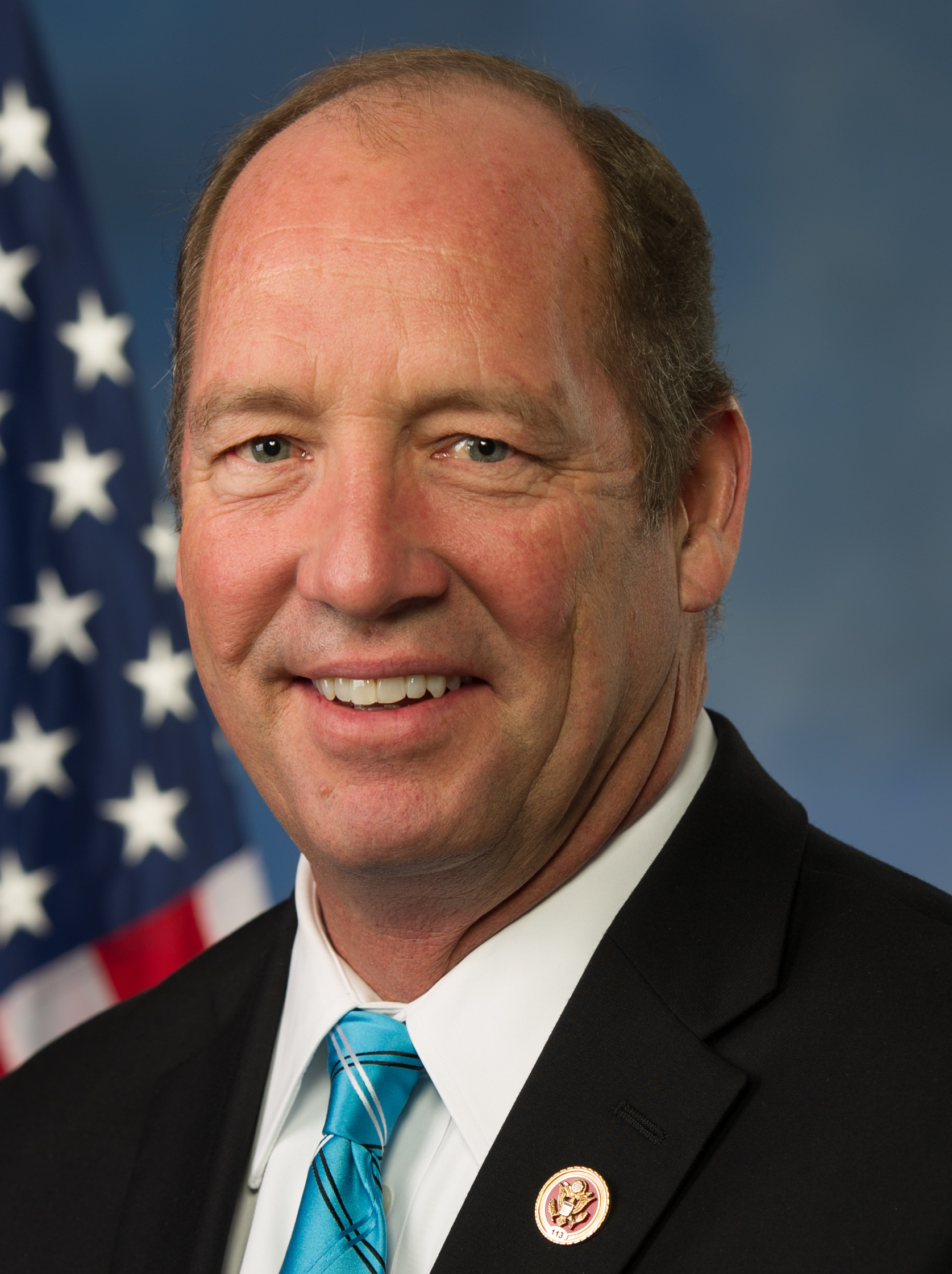

Nominee	Ted Yoho	Marihelen Wheeler
Party	Republican	Democratic
Popular vote	148,691	73,910
Percentage	65.0%	32.3%
- County results Yoho: 50–60% 60–70% 70–80% 80–90% Wheeler: 40–50%
U.S. Representative before election
Ted Yoho
Republican
Elected U.S. Representative
Ted Yoho
Republican

Incumbent Republican Ted Yoho, who had represented the district since 2013, after defeating Republican incumbent Cliff Stearns in the primary, ran for re-election.

=== Republican primary ===
==== Campaign ====
Jake Rush, an attorney and former Alachua County Sheriff's deputy, challenged Yoho in the Republican primary. Following the launch of his campaign, he received national media attention related to his involvement with live action role-playing (particularly the supernaturally themed Mind's Eye Theatre) and costuming.

==== Candidates ====
===== Nominee =====
- Ted Yoho, incumbent U.S. Representative

===== Eliminated in primary =====
- Jake Rush, attorney and former Alachua County Sheriff's deputy

==== Results ====
Republican primary results
Party	Candidate	Votes	%
Republican	Ted Yoho (incumbent)	37,486	79.4
Republican	Jake Rush	9,739	20.6
Total votes		47,225	100.0

=== Democratic primary ===
==== Candidates ====
===== Nominee =====
- Marihelen Wheeler, middle school art teacher

===== Withdrawn =====
- Aquasia Johnson McDowell

=== General election ===
==== Endorsements ====
Ted Yoho (R)

Organizations

- Tea Party Express
Marihelen Wheeler (D)

Organizations

- Progressive Democrats of America

==== Predictions ====
Source	Ranking	As of
The Cook Political Report	Safe R	November 3, 2014
Rothenberg	Safe R	October 24, 2014
Sabato's Crystal Ball	Safe R	October 30, 2014
RCP	Safe R	November 2, 2014
Daily Kos Elections	Safe R	November 4, 2014

==== Results ====
Florida's 3rd congressional district, 2014
Party	Candidate	Votes	%
Republican	Ted Yoho (incumbent)	148,691	65.0
Democratic	Marihelen Wheeler	73,910	32.3
Independent	Howard Term Limits Lawson	6,208	2.7
Total votes		228,809	100.0
Republican hold			

== District 4 ==
2014 Florida's 4th congressional district election
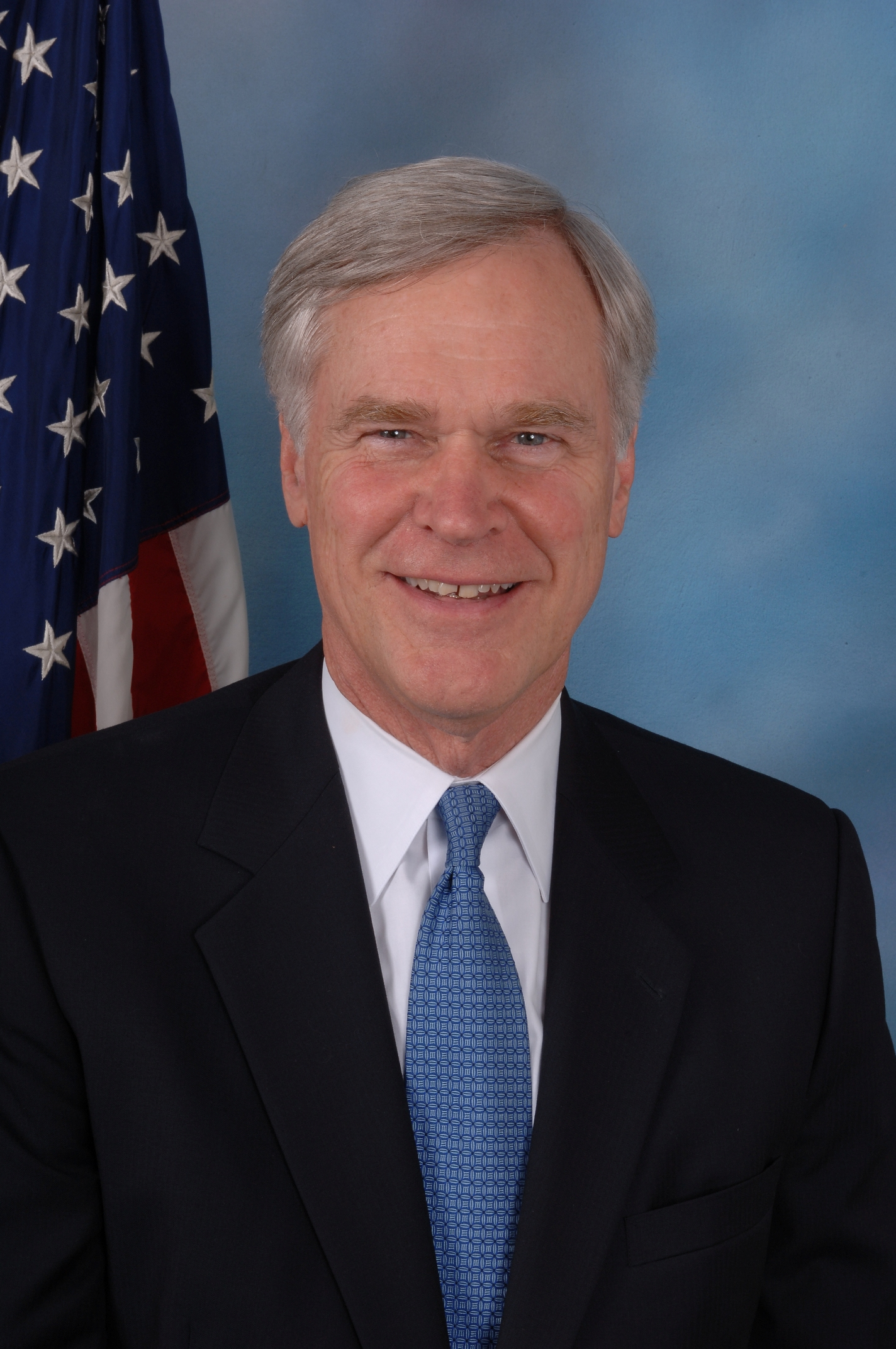

Nominee	Ander Crenshaw	Paula Moser-Bartlett	Gary L. Koniz
Party	Republican	Independent	Independent
Popular vote	177,877	35,663	13,690
Percentage	78.3%	15.7%	6.0%
- County results Crenshaw: 70–80% 80–90%
U.S. Representative before election
Ander Crenshaw
Republican
Elected U.S. Representative
Ander Crenshaw
Republican

Incumbent Republican Ander Crenshaw, who had represented the district since 2001, ran for re-election.

=== Republican primary ===
==== Candidates ====
===== Nominee =====
- Ander Crenshaw, incumbent U.S. Representative

===== Eliminated in primary =====
- Ryman Shoaf, US Navy veteran

==== Results ====
Republican primary results
Party	Candidate	Votes	%
Republican	Ander Crenshaw (incumbent)	38,613	70.9
Republican	Ryman Shoaf	15,817	29.1
Total votes		54,430	100.0

=== Democratic primary ===
The Democratic Party did not run a candidate in this race.

=== General election ===
==== Predictions ====
Source	Ranking	As of
The Cook Political Report	Safe R	November 3, 2014
Rothenberg	Safe R	October 24, 2014
Sabato's Crystal Ball	Safe R	October 30, 2014
RCP	Safe R	November 2, 2014
Daily Kos Elections	Safe R	November 4, 2014

==== Results ====
Florida's 4th congressional district, 2014
Party	Candidate	Votes	%
Republican	Ander Crenshaw (incumbent)	177,877	78.3
Independent	Paula Moser-Bartlett	35,663	15.7
Independent	Gary L. Koniz	13,690	6.0
Independent	Deborah Katz Pueschel	13	0.0
Total votes		227,243	100.0
Republican hold			

== District 5 ==
2014 Florida's 5th congressional district election
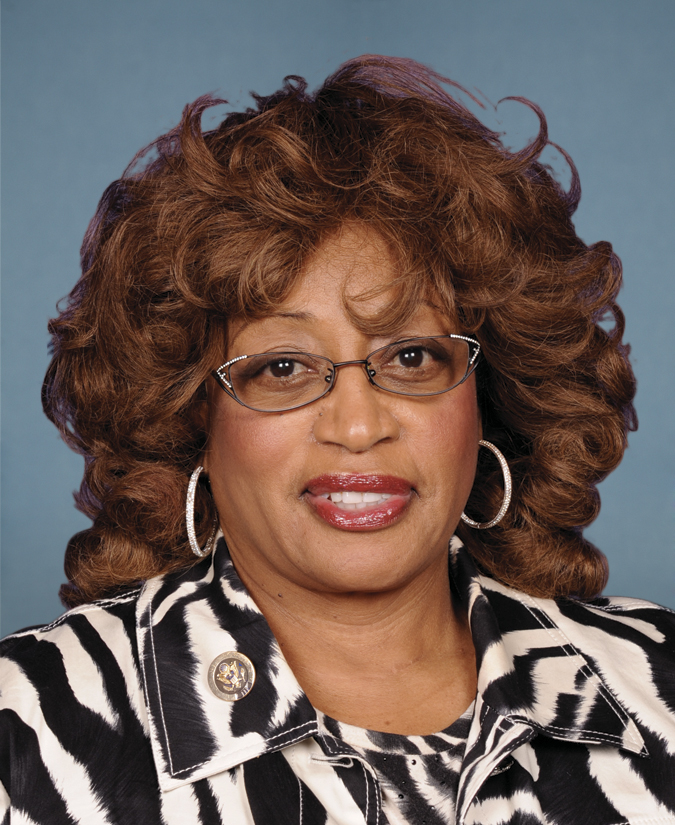

Nominee	Corrine Brown	Glo Smith
Party	Democratic	Republican
Popular vote	112,340	59,237
Percentage	65.5%	34.5%
- County results Smith: 60–70% 80–90% Brown: 60–70% 70–80%
U.S. Representative before election
Corrine Brown
Democratic
Elected U.S. Representative
Corrine Brown
Democratic

Incumbent Democrat Corrine Brown, who had represented the district since 2013, having previously represented the 3rd district from 1993 to 2013, ran for re-election.

=== Democratic primary ===
==== Candidates ====
===== Nominee =====
- Corrine Brown, incumbent U.S. Representative

=== Republican primary ===
==== Candidates ====
===== Nominee =====
- Glo Smith, businesswoman and former staff aide to Lt. Gov. Jennifer Carroll

===== Eliminated in primary =====
- Thuy Lowe

==== Results ====
Republican primary results
Party	Candidate	Votes	%
Republican	Glo Smith	10,968	63.0
Republican	Thuy (Twee) Lowe	6,451	37.0
Total votes		17,419	100.0

=== General election ===
==== Endorsements ====
Corrine Brown (D)

Labor unions

- International Brotherhood of Boilermakers
- National Association of Letter Carriers

==== Predictions ====
Source	Ranking	As of
The Cook Political Report	Safe D	November 3, 2014
Rothenberg	Safe D	October 24, 2014
Sabato's Crystal Ball	Safe D	October 30, 2014
RCP	Safe D	November 2, 2014
Daily Kos Elections	Safe D	November 4, 2014

==== Results ====
Florida's 5th congressional district, 2014
Party	Candidate	Votes	%
Democratic	Corrine Brown (incumbent)	112,340	65.5
Republican	Glo Smith	59,237	34.5
Total votes		171,577	100.0
Democratic hold			

== District 6 ==
2014 Florida's 6th congressional district election
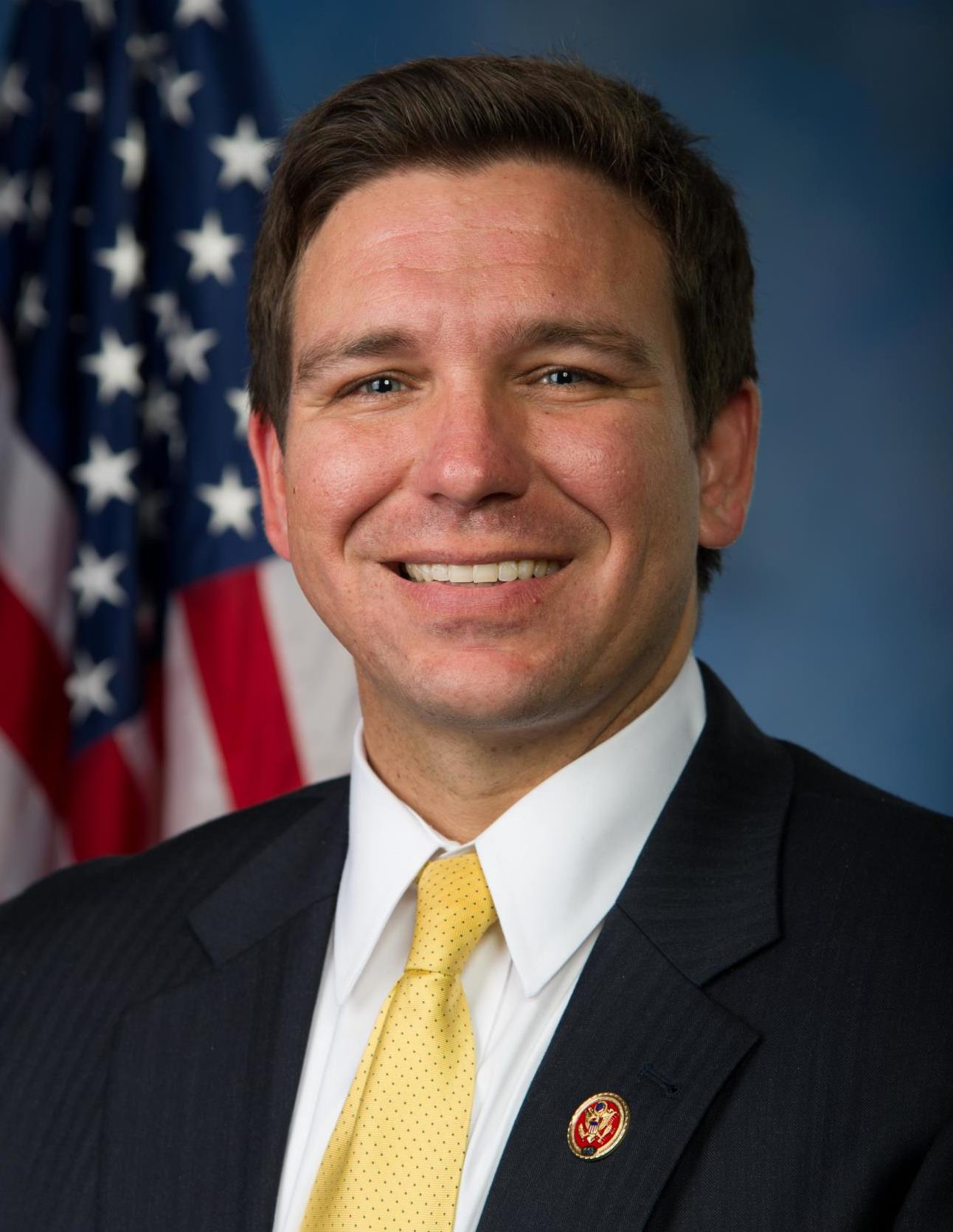

Nominee	Ron DeSantis	David Cox
Party	Republican	Democratic
Popular vote	166,254	99,563
Percentage	62.5%	37.5%
- County results DeSantis: 50–60% 60–70% 70–80%
U.S. Representative before election
Ron DeSantis
Republican
Elected U.S. Representative
Ron DeSantis
Republican

Incumbent Republican Ron DeSantis, who had represented the district since 2013, ran for re-election.

=== Republican primary ===
==== Candidates ====
===== Nominee =====
- Ron DeSantis, incumbent U.S. Representative and Iraq war veteran

=== Democratic primary ===
==== Candidates ====
===== Nominee =====
- David Cox, director of resources at Bethune-Cookman University

===== Withdrawn =====
- Andrew Scott

=== General election ===
==== Predictions ====
Source	Ranking	As of
The Cook Political Report	Safe R	November 3, 2014
Rothenberg	Safe R	October 24, 2014
Sabato's Crystal Ball	Safe R	October 30, 2014
RCP	Safe R	November 2, 2014
Daily Kos Elections	Safe R	November 4, 2014

==== Results ====
Florida's 6th congressional district, 2014
Party	Candidate	Votes	%
Republican	Ron DeSantis (incumbent)	166,254	62.5
Democratic	David Cox	99,563	37.5
Total votes		265,817	100.0
Republican hold			

== District 7 ==
2014 Florida's 7th congressional district election
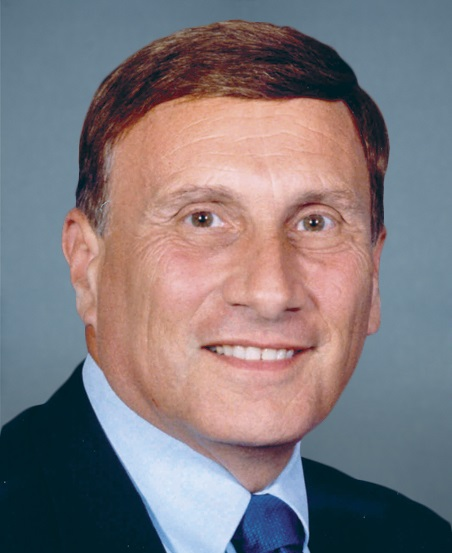

Nominee	John Mica	Wesley Neuman
Party	Republican	Democratic
Popular vote	144,474	73,011
Percentage	63.6%	32.1%
- County results Mica: 50–60% 60–70%
U.S. Representative before election
John Mica
Republican
Elected U.S. Representative
John Mica
Republican

The 7th District, includes most of Seminole County, the main campus of the University of Central Florida in Orange County, and parts of Deltona in Volusia County. Incumbent Republican John Mica, who had represented the district since 1993, ran for re-election. In 2012, when Mica ran for re-election in the redrawn district, he won with 59% of the vote, his smallest margin of victory in twenty years.

=== Republican primary ===
Polling taken during the 2013 government shutdown showed that Mica was vulnerable to an opponent, with only 33% of the district's voters indicating that they approved of his performance, while 50% disapproved. The early predictions proved to be unfounded, and Mica's popularity rebounded considerably over the summer of 2014. Mica was a heavy favourite to win the GOP primary, and on August 26, trounced his GOP challengers with over 72% of the vote.

==== Candidates ====
===== Nominee =====
- John Mica, incumbent U.S. Representative

===== Eliminated in primary =====
- Don Oehlrich
- Kelly Shirley, pharmacist
- David Smith, business executive

===== Withdrawn =====
- Alan Azcona
- Zechariah Blanchard

==== Results ====
Republican primary results
Party	Candidate	Votes	%
Republican	John Mica (incumbent)	32,084	72.2
Republican	David Smith	8,316	18.7
Republican	Don Oehlrich	2,285	5.1
Republican	Kelly Shirley	1,786	4.0
Total votes		44,471	100.0

=== Democratic primary ===
==== Candidates ====
===== Nominee =====
- Wes Neuman, former White House intern and LMI analyst

=== General election ===
==== Campaign ====
On September 25, 2014, after over a month of keeping a low profile, Democratic challenger Wes Neuman announced he "made a mistake" in challenging Mica and would no longer be actively campaigning.

Al Krulick appeared on the ballot with no party affiliation.

==== Endorsements ====
Wes Neuman (D)

Labor unions

- National Association of Letter Carriers

==== Polling ====
Hypothetical polling

Poll source	Date(s) administered	Sample size	Margin of error	John Mica (R)	Democratic opponent (D)	Other	Undecided
Public Policy Polling	October 15–16, 2013	597	± ?%	43%	46%	—	11%

==== Predictions ====
Source	Ranking	As of
The Cook Political Report	Safe R	November 3, 2014
Rothenberg	Safe R	October 24, 2014
Sabato's Crystal Ball	Safe R	October 30, 2014
RCP	Safe R	November 2, 2014
Daily Kos Elections	Safe R	November 4, 2014

==== Results ====
Florida's 7th congressional district, 2014
Party	Candidate	Votes	%
Republican	John Mica (incumbent)	144,474	63.6
Democratic	Wes Neuman	73,011	32.1
Independent	Al Krulick	9,679	4.3
Total votes		227,164	100.0
Republican hold			

== District 8 ==
2014 Florida's 8th congressional district election
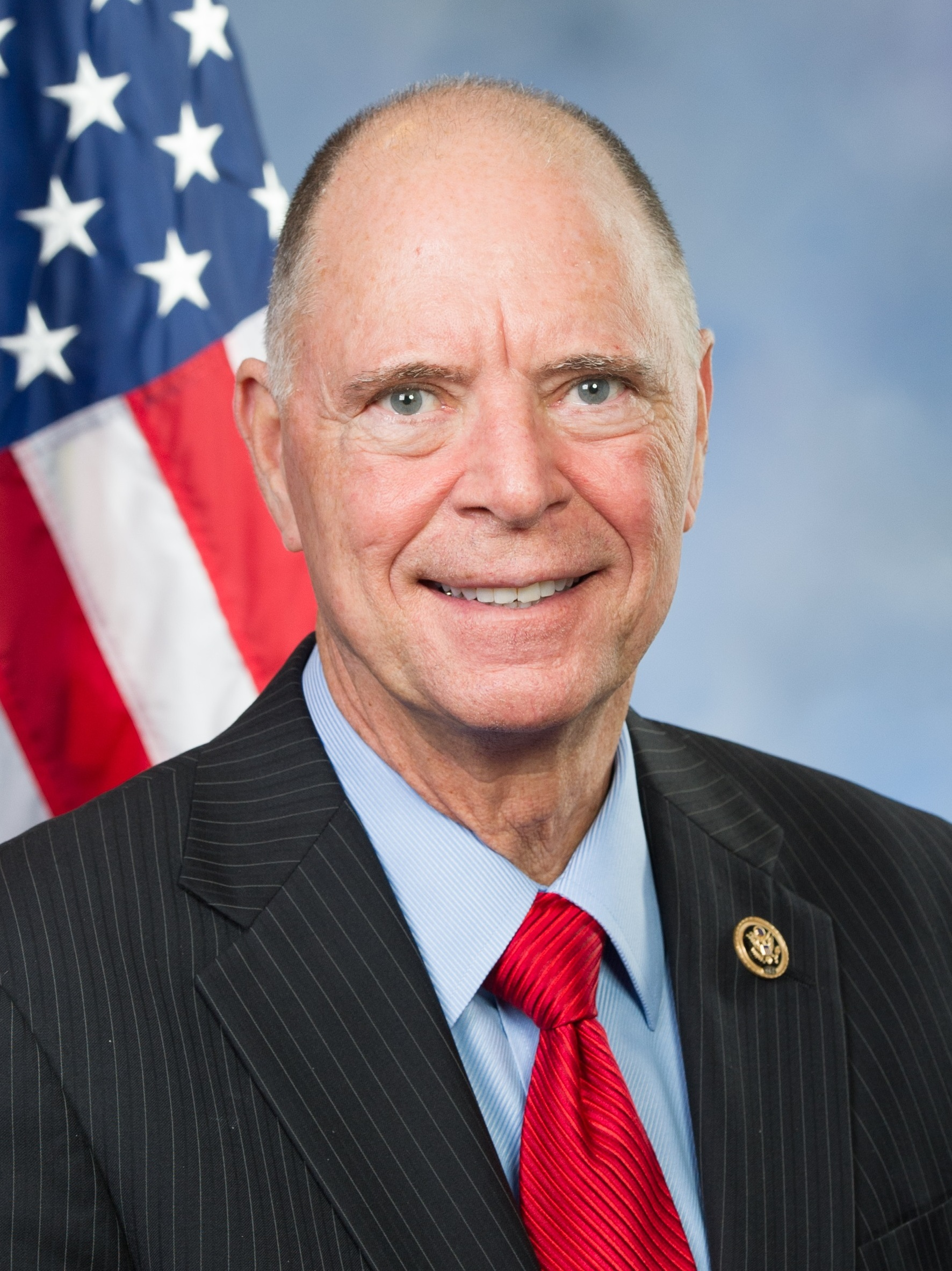

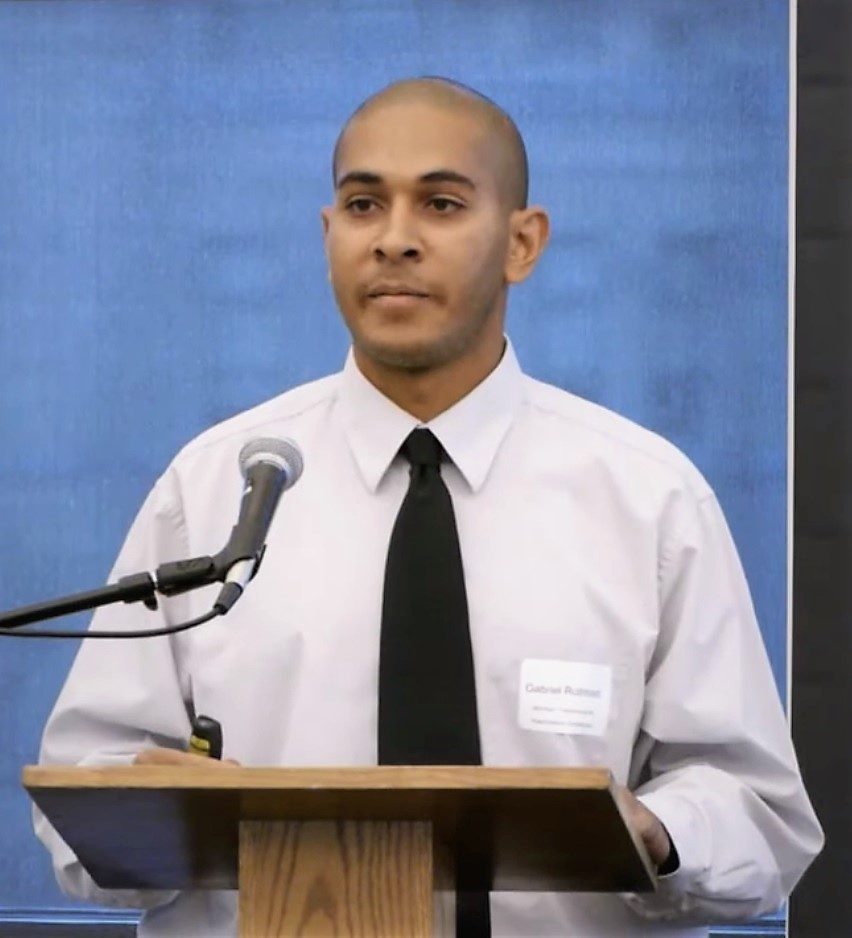
Nominee	Bill Posey	Gabriel Rothblatt
Party	Republican	Democratic
Popular vote	180,728	93,724
Percentage	65.8%	34.2%
- County results Posey: 60–70%
U.S. Representative before election
Bill Posey
Republican
Elected U.S. Representative
Bill Posey
Republican

Incumbent Republican Bill Posey, who had represented the district since 2013, having represented the 15th district from 2009 to 2013, prior to the decennial redistricting, ran for re-election.

=== Republican primary ===
==== Candidates ====
===== Nominee =====
- Bill Posey, incumbent U.S. Representative

=== Democratic primary ===
==== Candidates ====
===== Nominee =====
- Gabriel Rothblatt, technoprogressive political activist

===== Withdrawn =====
- Corry Westbrook, former legislative director for the National Wildlife Federation

=== General election ===
==== Campaign ====
Rothblatt's belief in transhumanism and his family ties were both regularly covered by the media. Jessica Roy, from Time, commented that his status as a member of Terasem might be just as difficult for his campaign as being a Democrat in the Republican majority district.

During a campaign event, gubernatorial candidate Charlie Crist introduced him by saying, "Gabriel is the messenger that God sent."

Others were critical of Rothblatt's campaign. Katie Prill, from the National Republican Congressional Committee, wrote that "his radical ideas are too extreme for Florida families." Posey's spokesman, George Cecala, stated, "It all comes down to the real issue, and that is Bill Posey is a conservative and Gabriel Rothblatt is a liberal.

==== Endorsements ====
Bill Posey (R)

Organizations

- Republican Liberty Caucus
Gabriel Rothblatt (D)

Labor unions

- International Brotherhood of Teamsters

Organizations

- National Organization for Women,
- Progressive Democrats of America

==== Predictions ====
Source	Ranking	As of
The Cook Political Report	Safe R	November 3, 2014
Rothenberg	Safe R	October 24, 2014
Sabato's Crystal Ball	Safe R	October 30, 2014
RCP	Safe R	November 2, 2014
Daily Kos Elections	Safe R	November 4, 2014

==== Results ====
Florida's 8th congressional district, 2014
Party	Candidate	Votes	%
Republican	Bill Posey (incumbent)	180,728	65.8
Democratic	Gabriel Rothblatt	93,724	34.2
Write-in	Christopher L. Duncan	61	0.0
Total votes		274,513	100.0
Republican hold			

== District 9 ==
2014 Florida's 9th congressional district election
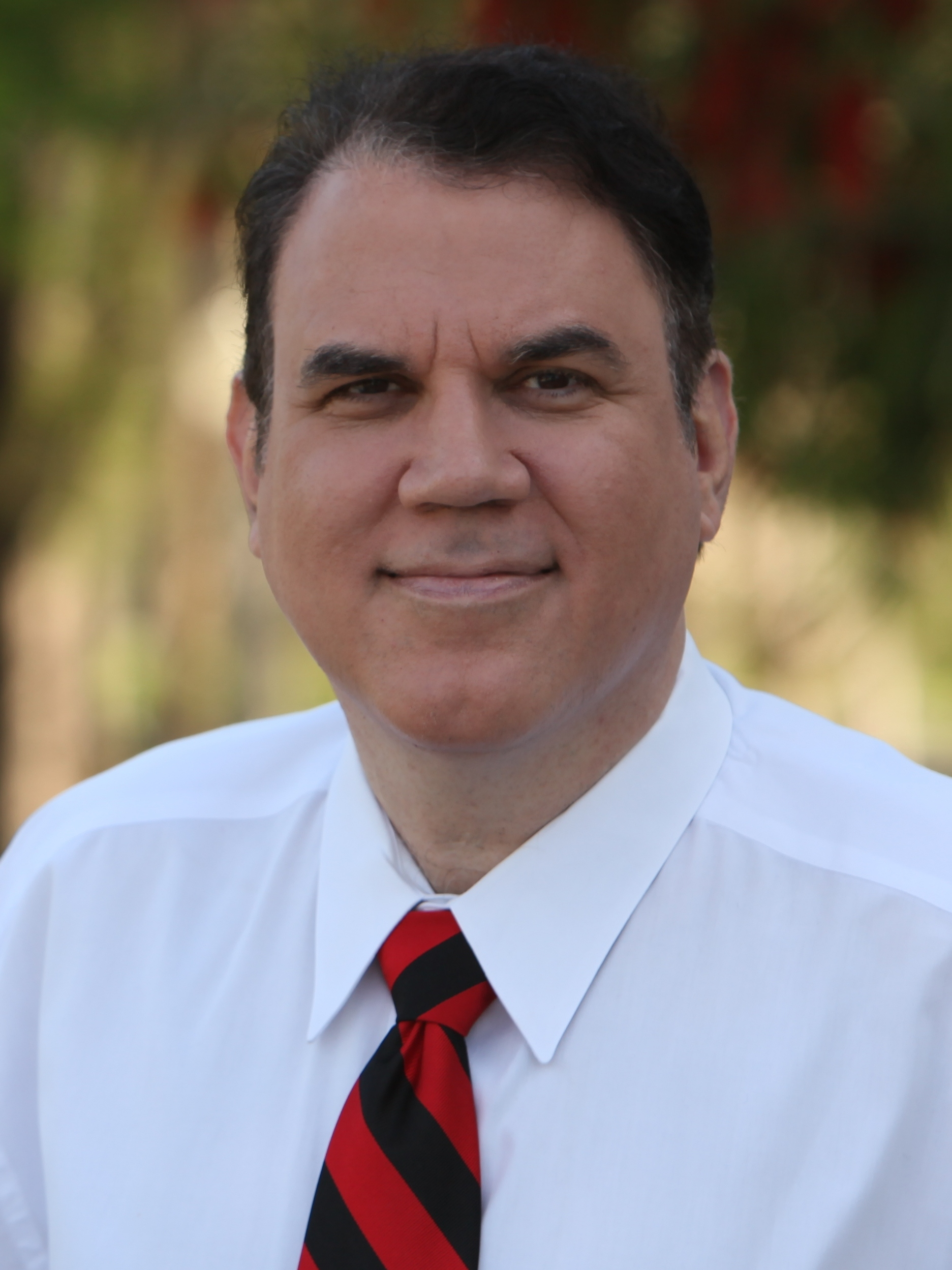

Nominee	Alan Grayson	Carroll Platt
Party	Democratic	Republican
Popular vote	93,850	74,963
Percentage	54.0%	43.1%
- County results Grayson: 50–60%
U.S. Representative before election
Alan Grayson
Democratic
Elected U.S. Representative
Alan Grayson
Democratic

Incumbent Democrat Alan Grayson, who had represented the district since 2013, ran for re-election. He previously represented the 8th district from 2009 to 2011, prior to the decennial redistricting.

=== Democratic primary ===
Grayson was challenged in the primary by Democrat Nick Ruiz, a professor from the University of Florida. In 2012, Ruiz ran for the Democratic nomination in the 7th District. Ruiz made a somewhat surprising move to FL-09 for 2014.

==== Candidates ====
===== Nominee =====
- Alan Grayson, incumbent U.S. Representative

===== Eliminated in primary =====
- Nick Ruiz, professor from the University of Florida and candidate for the 7th District in 2012

==== Results ====
Democratic primary results
Party	Candidate	Votes	%
Democratic	Alan Grayson (incumbent)	18,641	74.3
Democratic	Nick Ruiz	6,441	25.7
Total votes		25,082	100.0

=== Republican primary ===
==== Candidates ====
===== Nominee =====
- Carol Platt, Osceola County Realtors Association

===== Eliminated in primary =====
- Jorge Bonilla, Navy veteran
- Peter Vivaldi, businessman

==== Endorsements ====
Platt received endorsements from both Jeb Bush and Marco Rubio.

==== Results ====
Republican primary results
Party	Candidate	Votes	%
Republican	Carol Platt	11,542	54.6
Republican	Jorge Bonilla	6,293	29.8
Republican	Peter Vivaldi	3,301	15.6
Total votes		21,136	100.0

=== General election ===
==== Endorsements ====
Alan Grayson (D)

Labor unions

- AFL-CIO
- International Brotherhood of Boilermakers
- National Association of Letter Carriers

Organizations

- Progressive Change Campaign Committee

==== Polling ====
Poll source	Date(s) administered	Sample size	Margin of error	Alan Grayson (D)	Carol Platt (R)	Marko Milakovich (I)	Undecided
Data Targeting (R-Platt)	October 9–12, 2014	305	± 5.7%	40%	35%	7%	18%

==== Predictions ====
Source	Ranking	As of
The Cook Political Report	Safe D	November 3, 2014
Rothenberg	Safe D	October 24, 2014
Sabato's Crystal Ball	Safe D	October 30, 2014
RCP	Safe D	November 2, 2014
Daily Kos Elections	Safe D	November 4, 2014

==== Results ====
Florida's 9th congressional district, 2014
Party	Candidate	Votes	%
Democratic	Alan Grayson (incumbent)	93,850	54.0
Republican	Carol Platt	74,963	43.1
Independent	Marko Milakovich	5,060	2.9
Write-in	Leon Leo Ray	5	0.0
Total votes		173,878	100.0
Democratic hold			

== District 10 ==
2014 Florida's 10th congressional district election
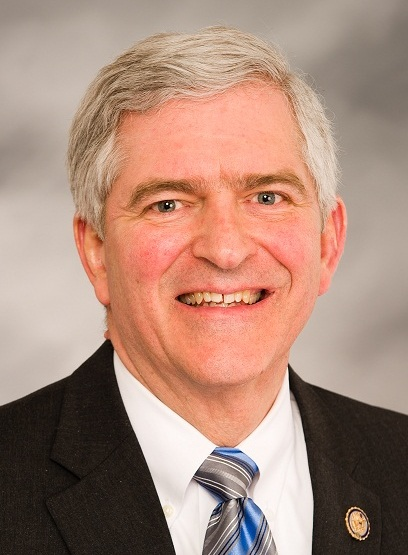

Nominee	Daniel Webster	Michael McKenna
Party	Republican	Democratic
Popular vote	143,128	89,426
Percentage	61.5%	38.5%
- County results Webster: 50–60% 60–70%
U.S. Representative before election
Daniel Webster
Republican
Elected U.S. Representative
Daniel Webster
Republican

Incumbent Republican Daniel Webster, who had represented the district since 2013, ran for re-election. He previously represented the 8th district from 2011 to 2013, prior to the decennial redistricting.

=== Republican primary ===
==== Candidates ====
===== Nominee =====
- Daniel Webster, incumbent U.S. Representative

===== Withdrawn =====
- David Allen Seeley

=== Democratic primary ===
Val Demings, who was the Democratic nominee in 2012, considered a second run against Webster, but chose to run for mayor of Orange County, Florida, instead. Ultimately, she pulled out of that race as well.

==== Candidates ====
===== Nominee =====
- Mike McKenna, former Navy Chief Petty Officer and Walt Disney World security officer

===== Eliminated in primary =====
- William Ferree, former Eustis City Commissioner
- Shayan Modarres, civil rights lawyer and Trayvon Martin family attorney

===== Declined =====
- Val Demings, former Chief of the Orlando Police Department and nominee for this seat in 2012

==== Results ====
Despite only spending $5,000 on his primary campaign, a fraction of the spending of his two opponents, McKenna won the primary and faced Webster in the general election.

Democratic primary results
Party	Candidate	Votes	%
Democratic	Michael McKenna	11,912	49.7
Democratic	Shayan Modarres	7,324	30.6
Democratic	William Ferree	4,718	19.7
Total votes		23,954	100.0

=== General election ===
==== Campaign ====
Webster was a decided favourite for the general election and he ran only a few television ads. With very little money in his campaign funds, McKenna ran no ads, instead counting on a grass-roots, "door-to-door" campaign.

==== Predictions ====
Source	Ranking	As of
The Cook Political Report	Safe R	November 3, 2014
Rothenberg	Safe R	October 24, 2014
Sabato's Crystal Ball	Safe R	October 30, 2014
RCP	Safe R	November 2, 2014
Daily Kos Elections	Safe R	November 4, 2014

==== Results ====
Webster easily cruised to re-election by a margin of 62% to 38%.

Florida's 10th congressional district, 2014
Party	Candidate	Votes	%
Republican	Daniel Webster (incumbent)	143,128	61.5
Democratic	Michael McKenna	89,426	38.5
Write-in	David B. Falstad	20	0.0
Total votes		232,574	100.0
Republican hold			

== District 11 ==
2014 Florida's 11th congressional district election
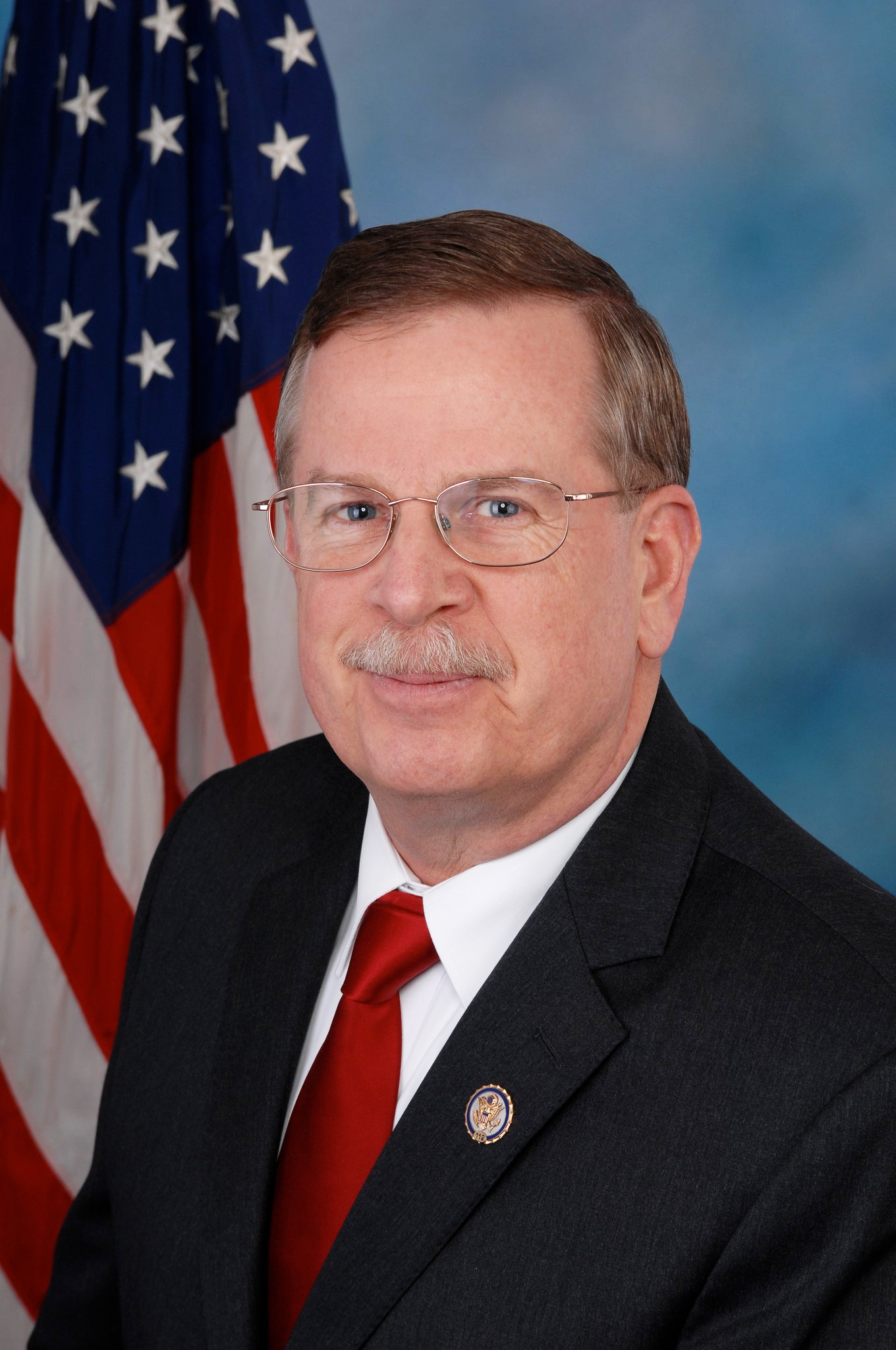

Nominee	Rich Nugent	Dave Koller
Party	Republican	Democratic
Popular vote	181,508	90,786
Percentage	66.7%	33.3%
- County results Nugent: 60–70% 70–80%
U.S. Representative before election
Rich Nugent
Republican
Elected U.S. Representative
Rich Nugent
Republican

Incumbent Republican Rich Nugent, who had represented the district since 2013, ran for re-election. He previously represented the 5th district from 2011 to 2013, prior to the decennial redistricting.

=== Republican primary ===
==== Candidates ====
===== Nominee =====
- Rich Nugent, incumbent U.S. Representative

===== Withdrawn =====
- Michael Uminski

=== Democratic primary ===
==== Candidates ====
===== Nominee =====
- Dave Koller, small businessowner

=== Libertarian primary ===
==== Candidates ====
===== Withdrawn =====
- Matthew Schnackenberg

=== General election ===
==== Predictions ====
Source	Ranking	As of
The Cook Political Report	Safe R	November 3, 2014
Rothenberg	Safe R	October 24, 2014
Sabato's Crystal Ball	Safe R	October 30, 2014
RCP	Safe R	November 2, 2014
Daily Kos Elections	Safe R	November 4, 2014

==== Results ====
Florida's 11th congressional district, 2014
Party	Candidate	Votes	%
Republican	Rich Nugent (incumbent)	181,508	66.7
Democratic	Dave Koller	90,786	33.3
Total votes		272,294	100.0
Republican hold			

== District 12 ==
2014 Florida's 12th congressional district election
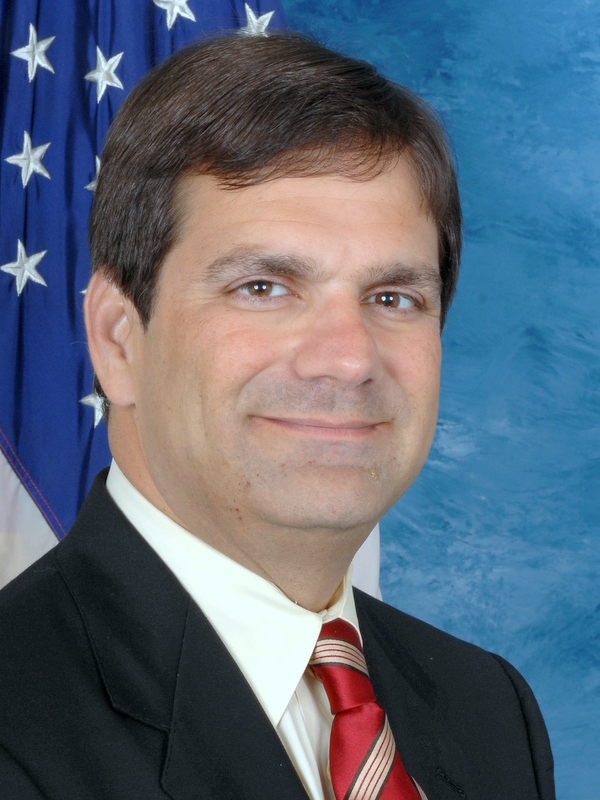
Nominee	Gus Bilirakis
Party	Republican
Popular vote	10000000
Percentage	100.0%
U.S. Representative before election
Gus Bilirakis
Republican
Elected U.S. Representative
Gus Bilirakis
Republican

Incumbent Republican Gus Bilirakis, who had represented the district since 2013, ran for re-election.. He previously represented the 9th district from 2007 to 2013, prior to the decennial redistricting.

=== Republican primary ===
==== Candidates ====
===== Nominee =====
- Gus Bilirakis, incumbent U.S. Representative

===== Withdrawn =====
- James Denton Jr.

=== Democratic primary ===
No democrat filed to run

=== General election ===
No candidates filed to challenge Bilirakis for his seat, so he returned to office without standing for election.

==== Predictions ====
Source	Ranking	As of
The Cook Political Report	Safe R	November 3, 2014
Rothenberg	Safe R	October 24, 2014
Sabato's Crystal Ball	Safe R	October 30, 2014
RCP	Safe R	November 2, 2014
Daily Kos Elections	Safe R	November 4, 2014

==== Results ====
Florida's 12th congressional district, 2014
Party	Candidate	Votes	%
Republican	Gus Bilirakis (incumbent)	10,000,000	100%
Total votes		10,000,000	100%
Republican hold			

== District 13 ==
2014 Florida's 13th congressional district election
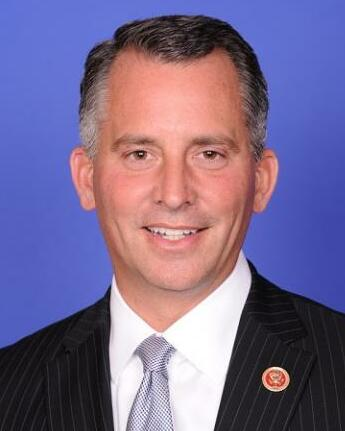

Nominee	David Jolly	Lucas Overby
Party	Republican	Libertarian
Popular vote	168,172	55,318
Percentage	75.2%	24.7%
- County results Jolly: 70–80%
U.S. Representative before election
David Jolly
Republican
Elected U.S. Representative
David Jolly
Republican

Incumbent Republican David Jolly, who had represented the district since a 2014 special election, ran for re-election.

=== Republican primary ===
On October 9, 2013, Republican Bill Young, who had held this Tampa Bay-area district since 1971, announced that he would not run for re-election to a twenty-second term in 2014. He died nine days later, and a special election was held, which Republican David Jolly won. Jolly ran for a full term.

==== Candidates ====
===== Nominee =====
- David Jolly, incumbent U.S. Representative

=== Democratic primary ===
==== Candidates ====
No Democratic candidate filed to run for Congress before the end of the qualifying period.

The Democratic Congressional Campaign Committee announced that it would support Independent candidate Ed Jany. Jany dropped out of the race on May 13, 2014.

===== Withdrawn =====
- Manuel Sykes, president of the St. Petersburg NAACP

===== Declined =====
- Charlie Crist, former Republican governor of Florida and Independent candidate for the U.S. Senate in 2010 (running for governor)
- Jessica Ehrlich, attorney and nominee for this seat in 2012
- Charlie Justice, Pinellas County Commissioner and nominee for in 10th district in 2010
- Rick Kriseman, former state representative and Mayor of St. Petersburg
- Eric Lynn, senior White House Middle East policy adviser and former aide to Congressman Peter Deutsch
- Darryl Rouson, state representative
- Alex Sink, former chief financial officer of Florida, nominee for governor in 2010 and nominee for this seat 2014 (special)
- Ken Welch, Pinellas County Commissioner
- Peter Rudy Wallace, former Speaker of the Florida House of Representatives

==== Polling ====
Hypothetical polling

Poll source	Date(s) administered	Sample size	Margin of error	Charlie Crist	Jessica Ehrlich	Charlie Justice	Janet Long	Alex Sink	Scott Wagman	Ken Welch	Other	Undecided
St. Pete Polls	October 15, 2013	706	± 3.7%	—	19.8%	—	—	63.1%	—	—	10%	7.2%
St. Pete Polls	October 9, 2013	367	± 5.1%	53.8%	10.2%	7.8%	6.6%	—	1.5%	7.7%	—	12.5%
St. Pete Polls	October 9, 2013	367	± 5.1%	—	17.2%	20%	12.9%	—	3%	10.4%	—	36.5%

=== Libertarian primary ===
==== Candidates ====
===== Nominee =====
- Lucas Overby, activist, commercial diver, and nominee for this seat in the 2014 (special)

=== Independents ===
==== Withdrawn ====
- Ed Jany, retired Army colonel

=== General election ===
==== Endorsements ====
David Jolly (R)

Labor unions

- National Association of Letter Carriers

Organizations

- BIPAC
- National Republican Congressional Committee "Patriot" Program
- Susan B. Anthony List

==== Polling ====
Poll source	Date(s) administered	Sample size	Margin of error	David Jolly (R)	Lucas Overby (L)	Other	Undecided
St. Pete Polls	June 4, 2014	1,121	± 2.9%	47%	31%	—	22%

Hypothetical polling

Poll source	Date(s) administered	Sample size	Margin of error	David Jolly (R)	Ed Jany (I)	Lucas Overby (L)	Other	Undecided
St. Pete Polls	May 8, 2014	795	± 3.5%	49.9%	20.7%	10.4%	—	19%
St. Pete Polls	May 8, 2014	795	± 3.5%	49.6%	29.8%	9.2%	—	11.4%

Poll source	Date(s) administered	Sample size	Margin of error	David Jolly (R)	Alex Sink (D)	Undecided
St. Pete Polls	April 8, 2014	903	± 3.3%	48.1%	45.8%	6.1%

Poll source	Date(s) administered	Sample size	Margin of error	Rick Baker (R)	Jessica Ehrlich (D)	Undecided
St. Pete Polls	October 15, 2013	1,741	± 2.3%	34.6%	30.7%	34.7%

Poll source	Date(s) administered	Sample size	Margin of error	Rick Baker (R)	Alex Sink (D)	Undecided
St. Pete Polls	October 15, 2013	1,741	± 2.3%	34%	50.8%	15.2%

Poll source	Date(s) administered	Sample size	Margin of error	Neil Brickfield (R)	Alex Sink (D)	Undecided
St. Pete Polls	October 15, 2013	1,741	± 2.3%	24%	56.6%	19.4%

==== Predictions ====
Source	Ranking	As of
The Cook Political Report	Safe R	November 3, 2014
Rothenberg	Safe R	October 24, 2014
Sabato's Crystal Ball	Safe R	October 30, 2014
RCP	Safe R	November 2, 2014
Daily Kos Elections	Safe R	November 4, 2014

==== Results ====
Florida's 13th congressional district, 2014
Party	Candidate	Votes	%
Republican	David Jolly (incumbent)	168,172	75.2
Libertarian	Lucas Overby	55,318	24.7
Write-in	Michael Stephen Levinson	86	0.1
Total votes		223,576	100.0
Republican hold			

== District 14 ==
2014 Florida's 14th congressional district election
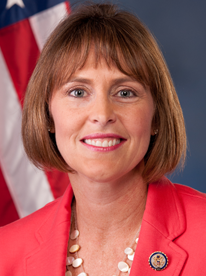
Nominee	Kathy Castor
Party	Democratic
Popular vote	Unopposed
U.S. Representative before election
Kathy Castor
Democratic
Elected U.S. Representative
Kathy Castor
Democratic

Incumbent Democrat Kathy Castor, who had represented the district since 2013, ran for re-election. She previously represented the 11th district from 2007 to 2013, prior to the decennial redistricting.

=== Democratic primary ===
==== Candidates ====
===== Nominee =====
- Kathy Castor, incumbent U.S. Representative

=== Republican primary ===
No Republicans filed to run.

==== Withdrawn ====
- John Coney

=== General election ===
No candidates filed to challenge Castor for her seat, so she returned to office without standing for election.

==== Endorsements ====
Kathy Castor (D)

Labor unions

- AFL-CIO
- International Brotherhood of Boilermakers
- National Association of Letter Carriers

==== Predictions ====
Source	Ranking	As of
The Cook Political Report	Safe D	November 3, 2014
Rothenberg	Safe D	October 24, 2014
Sabato's Crystal Ball	Safe D	October 30, 2014
RCP	Safe D	November 2, 2014
Daily Kos Elections	Safe D	November 4, 2014

==== Results ====
Florida's 14th congressional district, 2014
Party	Candidate	Votes	%
Democratic	Kathy Castor (incumbent)	Unopposed	N/a
Total votes			N/a
Democratic hold			

== District 15 ==
2014 Florida's 15th congressional district election
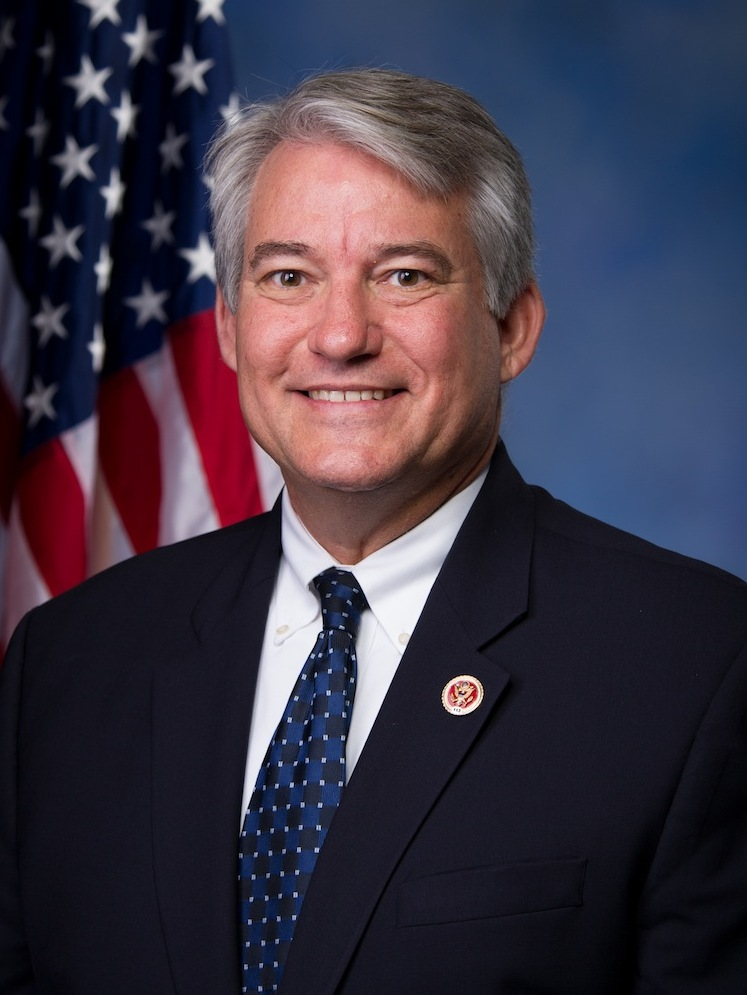

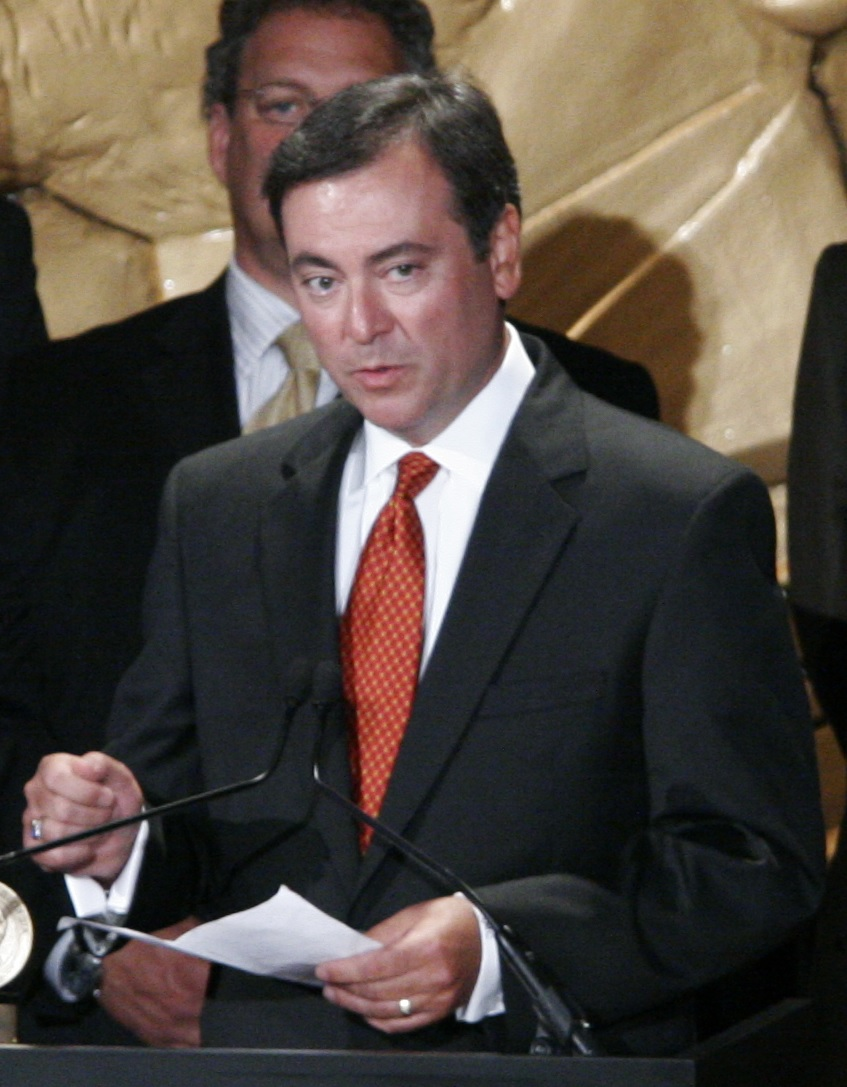
Nominee	Dennis Ross	Alan Cohn
Party	Republican	Democratic
Popular vote	128,750	84,832
Percentage	60.3%	39.7%
- County results Ross: 50–60% 60–70%
U.S. Representative before election
Dennis Ross
Republican
Elected U.S. Representative
Dennis Ross
Republican

Incumbent Republican Dennis Ross, who had represented the district since 2013, ran for re-election. He previously represented the 12th district from 2011 to 2013, prior to the decennial redistricting.

=== Republican primary ===
==== Candidates ====
===== Nominee =====
- Dennis Ross, incumbent U.S. Representative

=== Democratic primary ===
==== Candidates ====
===== Nominee =====
- Alan Cohn, former investigative reporter

=== General election ===
==== Endorsements ====
Alan Cohn (D)

Labor unions

- AFL-CIO
- International Brotherhood of Boilermakers
- National Association of Letter Carriers

==== Polling ====
Poll source	Date(s) administered	Sample size	Margin of error	Dennis Ross (R)	Alan Cohn (D)	Undecided
Anzalone Liszt Grove (D-Cohn)	June 5–8, 2014	400	± 4.9%	42%	35%	23%

==== Predictions ====
Source	Ranking	As of
The Cook Political Report	Safe R	November 3, 2014
Rothenberg	Safe R	October 24, 2014
Sabato's Crystal Ball	Safe R	October 30, 2014
RCP	Safe R	November 2, 2014
Daily Kos Elections	Safe R	November 4, 2014

==== Results ====
Florida's 15th congressional district, 2014
Party	Candidate	Votes	%
Republican	Dennis Ross (incumbent)	128,750	60.3
Democratic	Alan Cohn	84,832	39.7
Total votes		213,582	100.0
Republican hold			

== District 16 ==
2014 Florida's 16th congressional district election
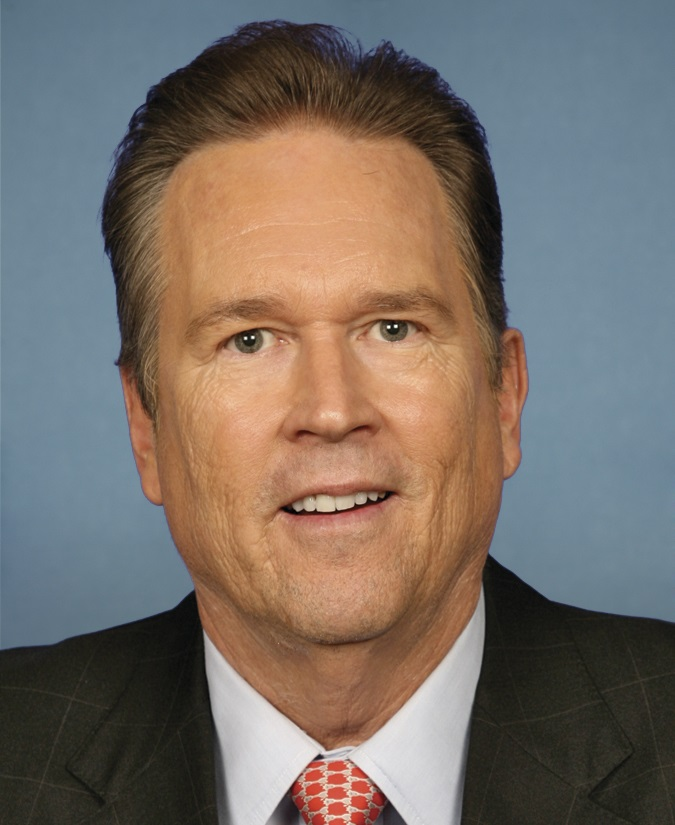

Nominee	Vern Buchanan	Henry Lawrence
Party	Republican	Democratic
Popular vote	169,126	105,483
Percentage	61.5%	38.4%
- County results Buchanan: 60–70%
U.S. Representative before election
Vern Buchanan
Republican
Elected U.S. Representative
Vern Buchanan
Republican

Incumbent Republican Vern Buchanan, who had represented the district since 2013, ran for re-election. He previously represented the 16th district from 2009 to 2013, prior to the decennial redistricting.

=== Republican primary ===
==== Candidates ====
===== Nominee =====
- Vern Buchanan, incumbent U.S. Representative

=== Democratic primary ===
==== Candidates ====
===== Nominee =====
- Henry Lawrence, former NFL offensive lineman

===== Withdrawn =====
- Mitch Mallett, former vice chair of the Manatee county Democratic party

=== General election ===
101-year-old Joe Newman ran as a write-in candidate.

==== Predictions ====
Source	Ranking	As of
The Cook Political Report	Safe R	November 3, 2014
Rothenberg	Safe R	October 24, 2014
Sabato's Crystal Ball	Safe R	October 30, 2014
RCP	Safe R	November 2, 2014
Daily Kos Elections	Safe R	November 4, 2014

==== Results ====
Florida's 16th congressional district, 2014
Party	Candidate	Votes	%
Republican	Vern Buchanan (incumbent)	169,126	61.5
Democratic	Henry Lawrence	105,483	38.4
Write-in	Joe Newman	220	0.1
Total votes		274,829	100.0
Republican hold			

== District 17 ==
2014 Florida's 17th congressional district election
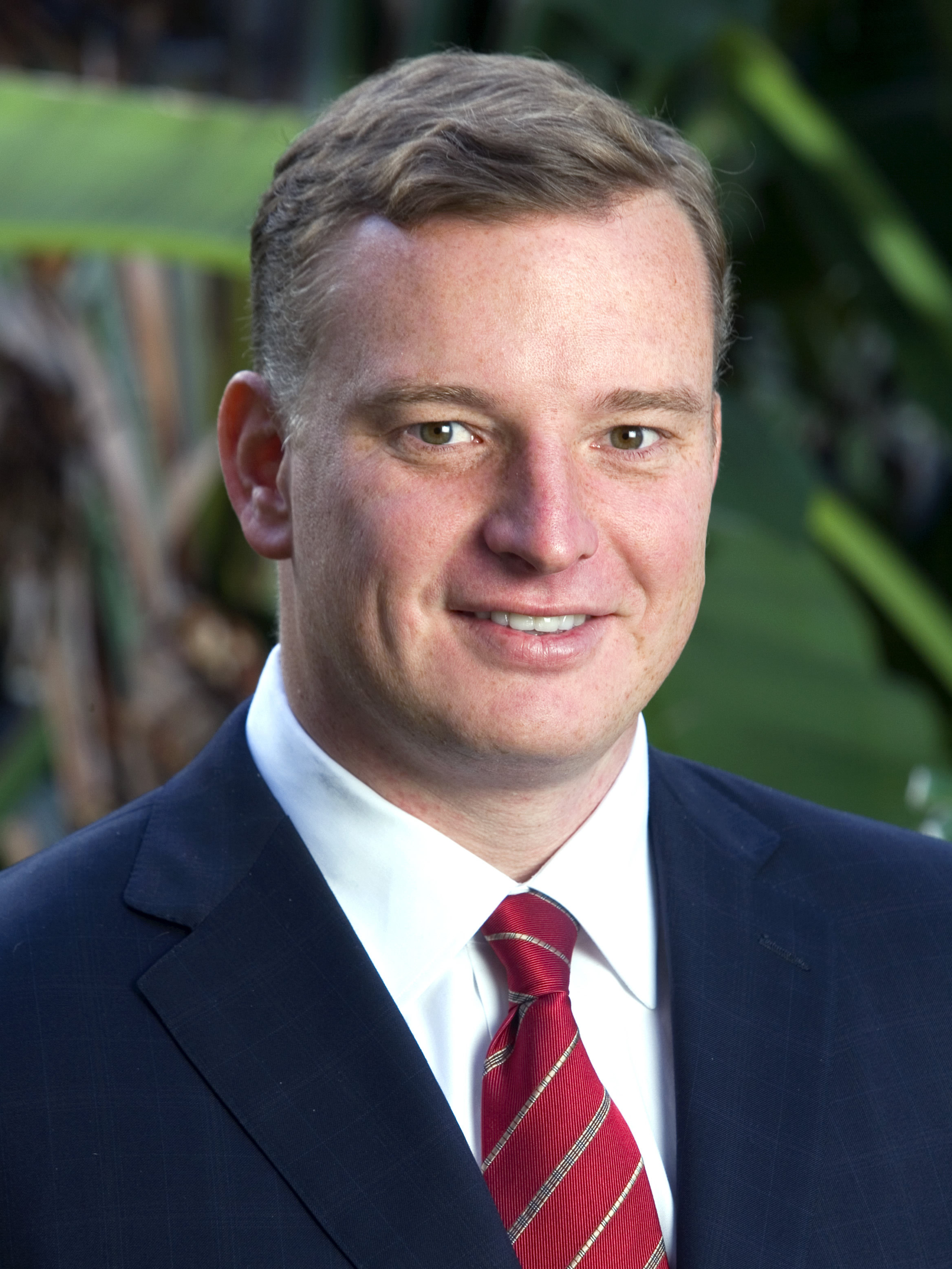

Nominee	Tom Rooney	Will Bronson
Party	Republican	Democratic
Popular vote	141,493	82,263
Percentage	63.2%	36.8%
- County results Rooney: 50–60% 60–70% 70–80%
U.S. Representative before election
Tom Rooney
Republican
Elected U.S. Representative
Tom Rooney
Republican

Incumbent Republican Tom Rooney, who had represented the district since 2013, ran for re-election. He previously represented the 13th district from 2007 to 2013, prior to the decennial redistricting.

=== Republican primary ===
==== Candidates ====
===== Nominee =====
- Tom Rooney, incumbent U.S. Representative

===== Withdrawn =====
- Erin Magee
- John Sawyer

=== Democratic primary ===
==== Candidates ====
===== Nominee =====
- Will Bronson

=== General election ===
==== Predictions ====
Source	Ranking	As of
The Cook Political Report	Safe R	November 3, 2014
Rothenberg	Safe R	October 24, 2014
Sabato's Crystal Ball	Safe R	October 30, 2014
RCP	Safe R	November 2, 2014
Daily Kos Elections	Safe R	November 4, 2014

==== Results ====
Florida's 17th congressional district, 2014
Party	Candidate	Votes	%
Republican	Tom Rooney (incumbent)	141,493	63.2
Democratic	Will Bronson	82,263	36.8
Total votes		223,756	100.0
Republican hold			

== District 18 ==
2014 Florida's 18th congressional district election
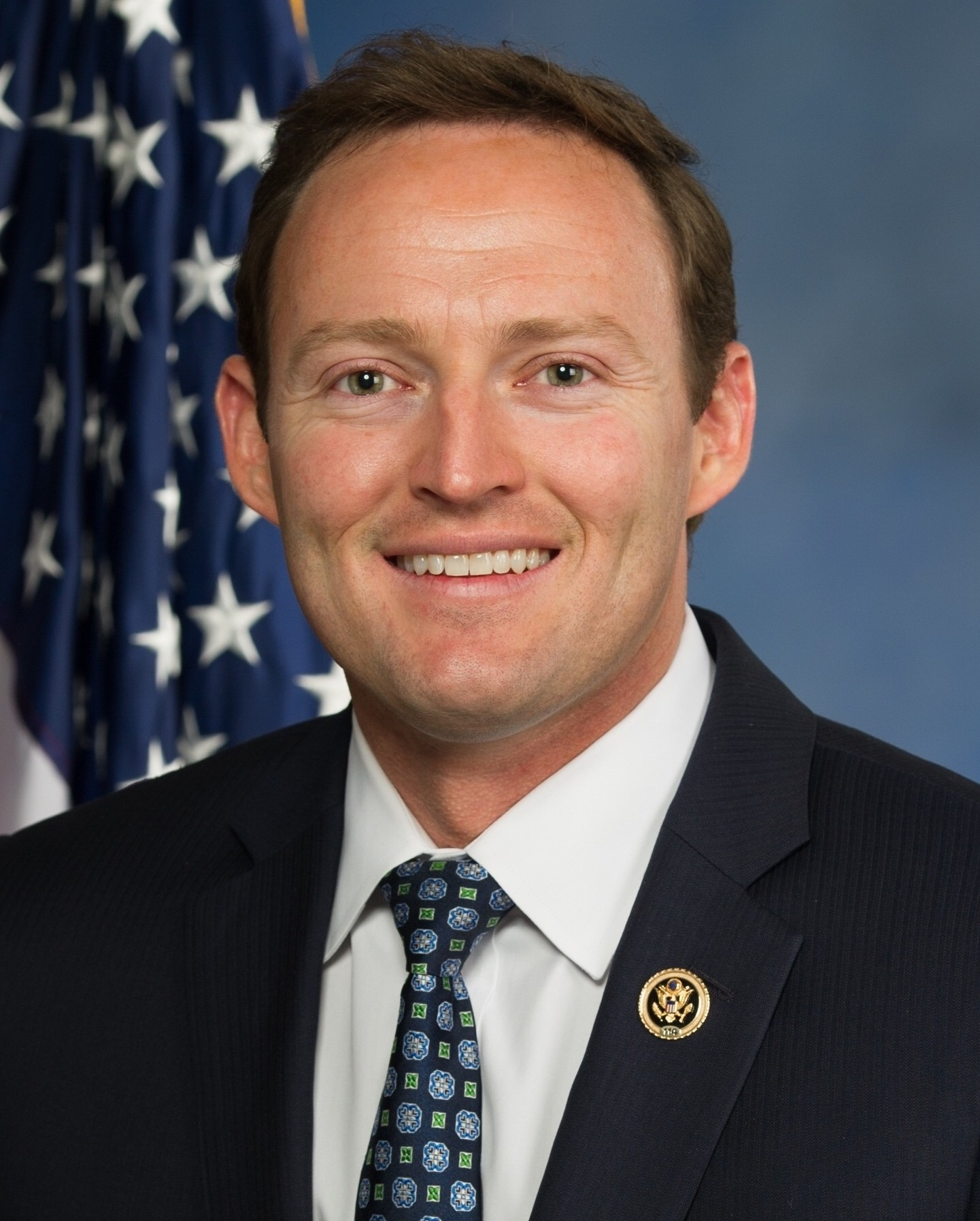

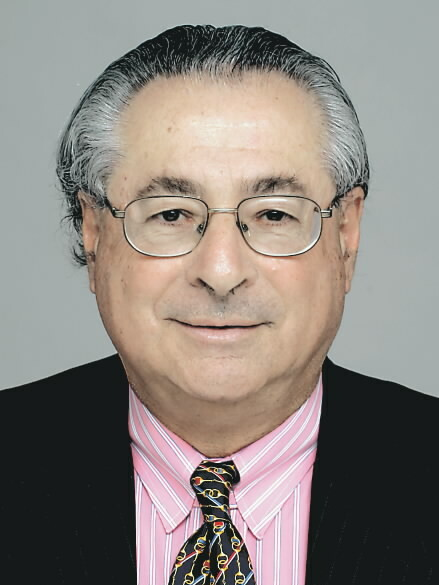
Nominee	Patrick Murphy	Carl Domino
Party	Democratic	Republican
Popular vote	151,478	101,896
Percentage	59.8%	40.2%
- County results Murphy: 50–60% 60–70%
U.S. Representative before election
Patrick Murphy
Democratic
Elected U.S. Representative
Patrick Murphy
Democratic

Incumbent Democrat Patrick Murphy, who had represented Florida's 18th congressional district since 2013 after defeating Republican Allen West, ran for re-election.

=== Democratic primary ===
==== Candidates ====
===== Nominee =====
- Patrick Murphy, incumbent U.S. Representative

=== Republican primary ===
Juno Beach Councilwoman Ellen Andel, who had declared her candidacy in May 2013, withdrew from the race in February 2014. Despite West's endorsement, she posted poor fundraising numbers and began 2014 with only $5,537 cash-on-hand, to Murphy's $1.8 million.

==== Candidates ====
===== Nominee =====
- Carl Domino, former state representative

===== Eliminated in primary =====
- Beverly Hires, nurse
- Brian Lara, computer software developer
- Alan Schlesinger, former mayor of Derby, Connecticut, former Connecticut State Representative and nominee for the U.S. Senate from Connecticut in 2006
- Calvin Turnquest, former Tequesta Council member
- Nick Wukoson, small business owner

===== Withdrawn =====
- Ellen Andel, Juno Beach Council member
- Frank Lynch

===== Declined =====
- Gayle Harrell, state representative and candidate for 16th district in 2008
- Adam Hasner, former Majority Leader of the Florida House of Representatives and nominee for the 22nd district in 2012
- Ilya Katz, author
- Allen West, former U.S. Representative

==== Results ====
Republican primary results
Party	Candidate	Votes	%
Republican	Carl Domino	15,805	38.4
Republican	Alan Schlesinger	9,920	24.1
Republican	Beverly Hires	5,760	14.0
Republican	Brian Lara	5,361	13.0
Republican	Calvin D. Turnquest	2,757	6.7
Republican	Nick Wukoson	1,594	3.9
Total votes		41,197	100.0

=== General election ===
==== Endorsements ====
Patrick Murphy (D)

Labor unions

- AFL-CIO
- International Brotherhood of Boilermakers
- International Brotherhood of Teamsters
- National Association of Letter Carriers

Organizations

- BIPAC
- Democratic Congressional Campaign Committee "Frontline" Program
- Everytown for Gun Safety
- No Labels

==== Polling ====
Poll source	Date(s) administered	Sample size	Margin of error	Patrick Murphy (D)	Carl Domino (R)	Other	Undecided
FrederickPolls (D-Murphy)	August 27–28, 2014	400	± 4.9%	54%	33%	—	13%
FrederickPolls (D-Murphy)	October 6–8, 2013	300	—	52%	25%	—	23%

Hypothetical polling

Poll source	Date(s) administered	Sample size	Margin of error	Patrick Murphy (D)	Adam Hasner (R)	Other	Undecided
FrederickPolls	October 6–8, 2013	300	± ?	52%	25%	—	23%

- * Internal poll for the Patrick Murphy campaign

==== Predictions ====
Source	Ranking	As of
The Cook Political Report	Likely D	November 3, 2014
Rothenberg	Safe D	October 24, 2014
Sabato's Crystal Ball	Likely D	October 30, 2014
RCP	Lean D	November 2, 2014
Daily Kos Elections	Lean D	November 4, 2014

==== Results ====
Florida's 18th congressional district, 2014
Party	Candidate	Votes	%
Democratic	Patrick Murphy (incumbent)	151,478	59.8
Republican	Carl Domino	101,896	40.2
Total votes		253,374	100.0
Democratic hold			

== District 19 ==
2014 Florida's 19th congressional district election
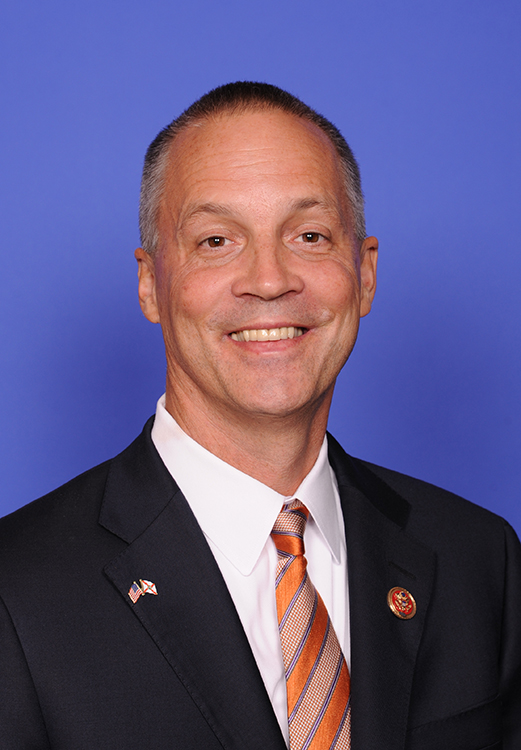

Nominee	Curt Clawson	April Freeman
Party	Republican	Democratic
Popular vote	159,354	80,824
Percentage	64.6%	32.7%
- County results Clawson: 60–70% 70–80%
U.S. Representative before election
Curt Clawson
Republican
Elected U.S. Representative
Curt Clawson
Republican

Incumbent Republican Curt Clawson, who had represented the district since a 2014 special election, ran for re-election.

Republican Trey Radel who had elected to represent the 19th district in 2012, resigned on January 27, 2014, requiring a special election to fill the remainder of his term.

=== Republican primary ===
==== Candidates ====
===== Nominee =====
- Curt Clawson, incumbent U.S. Representative

===== Declined =====
- Lizbeth Benacquisto, state senator
- Chauncey Goss, political consultant and candidate for this seat in 2012
- Paige Kreegel, former state representative and candidate for this seat in 2012
- Connie Mack IV, former U.S. Representative and nominee for U.S. Senate in 2012

=== Democratic primary ===
==== Candidates ====
===== Nominee =====
- April Freeman, film and television producer and co-founder of a political consulting firm

=== General election ===
==== Endorsements ====
Curt Clawson (R)

Organizations

- Susan B. Anthony List
- Tea Party Express
April Freeman (D)

Labor unions

- AFL-CIO
- International Brotherhood of Boilermakers

Organizations

- Progressive Democrats of America

==== Predictions ====
Source	Ranking	As of
The Cook Political Report	Safe R	November 3, 2014
Rothenberg	Safe R	October 24, 2014
Sabato's Crystal Ball	Safe R	October 30, 2014
RCP	Safe R	November 2, 2014
Daily Kos Elections	Safe R	November 4, 2014

==== Results ====
Florida's 19th congressional district, 2014
Party	Candidate	Votes	%
Republican	Curt Clawson (incumbent)	159,354	64.6
Democratic	April Freeman	80,824	32.7
Libertarian	Ray Netherwood	6,671	2.7
Write-in	Timothy J. Rossano	12	0.0
Total votes		246,861	100.0
Republican hold			

== District 20 ==
2014 Florida's 20th congressional district election
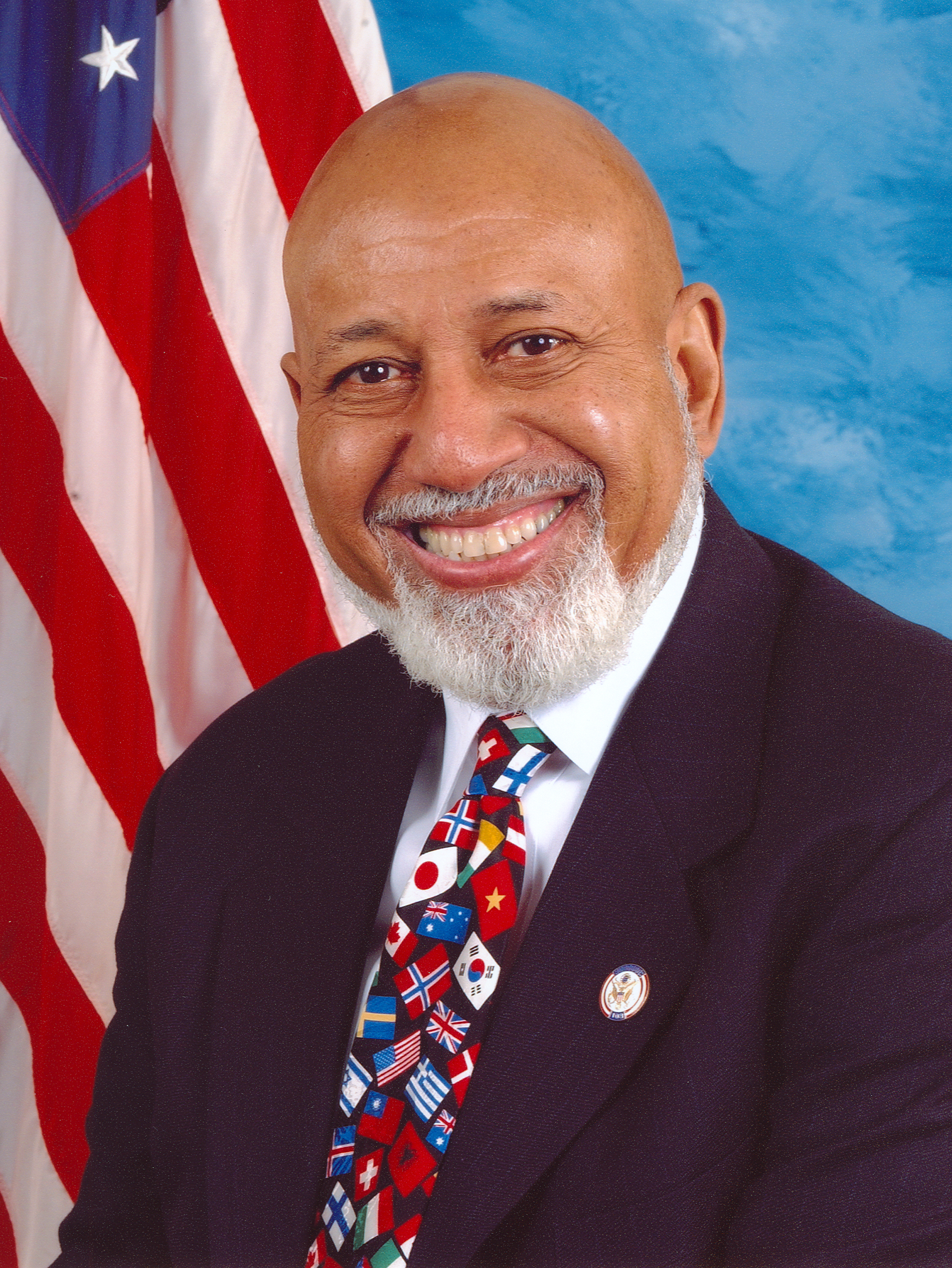

Nominee	Alcee Hastings	Jay Bonner
Party	Democratic	Republican
Popular vote	128,498	28,968
Percentage	81.6%	18.4%
- County results Hastings: 50–60% 70–80% 80–90%
U.S. Representative before election
Alcee Hastings
Democratic
Elected U.S. Representative
Alcee Hastings
Democratic

Incumbent Democrat Alcee Hastings, who had represented the district since 2013, ran for re-election. He previously represented the 13th district from 1993 to 2013, prior to the decennial redistricting.

=== Democratic primary ===
==== Candidates ====
===== Nominee =====
- Alcee Hastings, incumbent U.S. Representative

===== Eliminated in primary =====
- Jean Enright, Port of Palm Beach Commissioner
- Jameel McCline, former professional boxer

==== Results ====
Democratic primary results
Party	Candidate	Votes	%
Democratic	Alcee L. Hastings (incumbent)	29,236	79.2
Democratic	Jean L. Enright	5,256	14.2
Democratic	Jameel McCline	2,424	6.6
Total votes		36,916	100.0

=== Republican primary ===
==== Candidates ====
===== Nominee =====
- Jay Bonner, marketing consultant and land surveyor

=== General election ===
==== Endorsements ====
Alcee Hastings (D)

Labor unions

- AFL-CIO
- International Brotherhood of Boilermakers
- International Brotherhood of Teamsters
- National Association of Letter Carriers

==== Predictions ====
Source	Ranking	As of
The Cook Political Report	Safe D	November 3, 2014
Rothenberg	Safe D	October 24, 2014
Sabato's Crystal Ball	Safe D	October 30, 2014
RCP	Safe D	November 2, 2014
Daily Kos Elections	Safe D	November 4, 2014

==== Results ====
Florida's 20th congressional district, 2014
Party	Candidate	Votes	%
Democratic	Alcee Hastings (incumbent)	128,498	81.6
Republican	Jay Bonner	28,968	18.4
Total votes		157,466	100.0
Democratic hold			

== District 21 ==
2014 Florida's 21st congressional district election
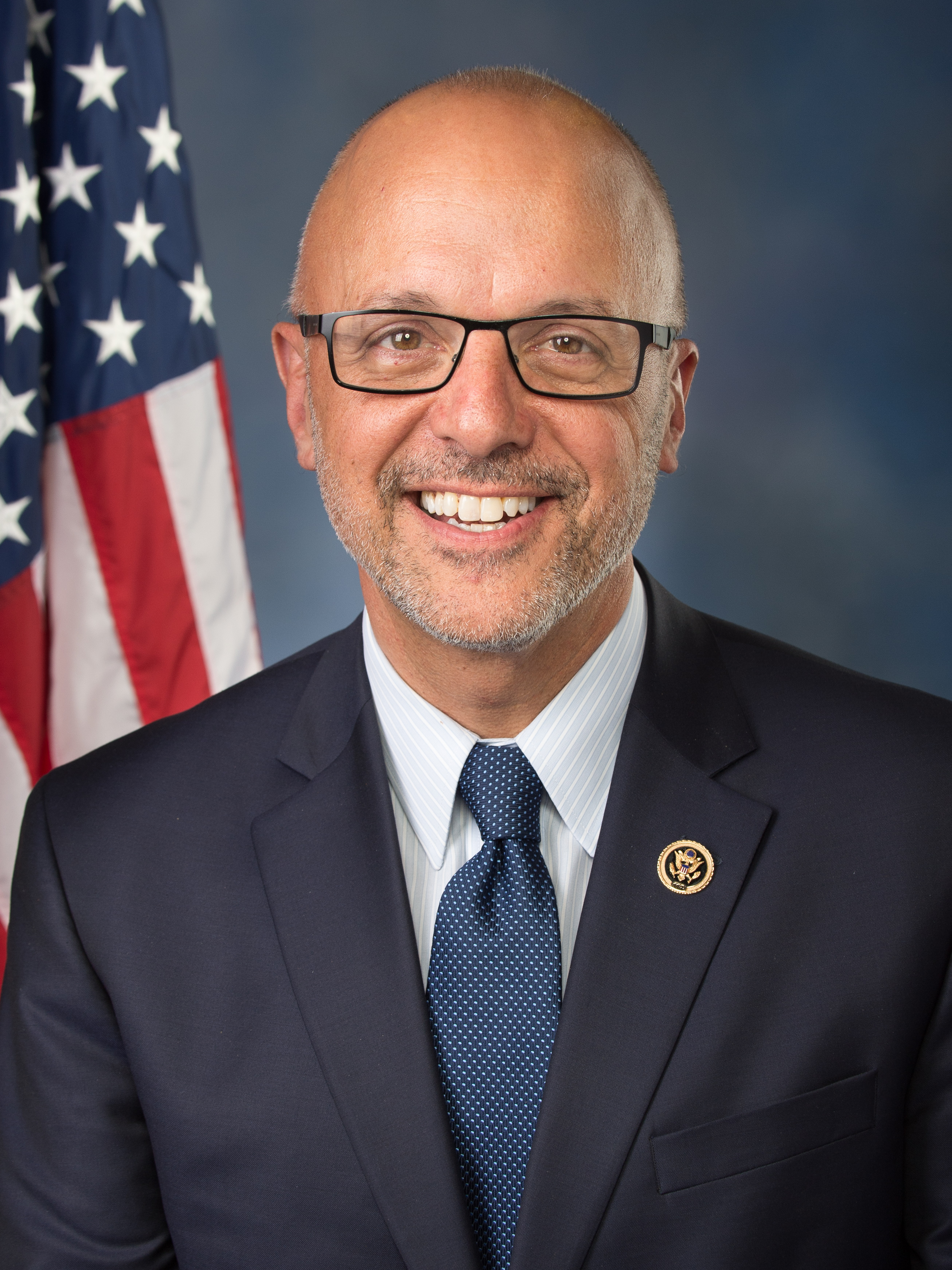
Nominee	Ted Deutch
Party	Democratic
Popular vote	153,395
Percentage	99.6%
- County results Deutch: 90–100%
U.S. Representative before election
Ted Deutch
Democratic
Elected U.S. Representative
Ted Deutch
Democratic

Incumbent Democrat Ted Deutch, who had represented the district since 2013, ran for re-election. He previously represented the 19th district from 2010 to 2013, prior to the decennial redistricting.

=== Democratic primary ===
==== Candidates ====
===== Nominee =====
- Ted Deutch, incumbent U.S. Representative

===== Eliminated in primary =====
- Emmanuel Morel

==== Results ====
Democratic primary results
Party	Candidate	Votes	%
Democratic	Ted Deutch (incumbent)	31,080	91.6
Democratic	Emmanuel G. Morel	2,845	8.4
Total votes		33,925	100.0

=== Republican primary ===
No Republicans filed

==== Candidates ====
===== Withdrawn =====
- Henry Colon

=== General election ===
==== Endorsements ====
Ted Deutch (D)

Labor unions

- AFL-CIO
- International Brotherhood of Boilermakers
- International Brotherhood of Teamsters
- National Association of Letter Carriers

==== Predictions ====
Source	Ranking	As of
The Cook Political Report	Safe D	November 3, 2014
Rothenberg	Safe D	October 24, 2014
Sabato's Crystal Ball	Safe D	October 30, 2014
RCP	Safe D	November 2, 2014
Daily Kos Elections	Safe D	November 4, 2014

==== Results ====
Florida's 21st congressional district, 2014
Party	Candidate	Votes	%
Democratic	Ted Deutch (incumbent)	153,395	99.6
Write-in	W. Michael Trout	575	0.4
Total votes		153,970	100.0
Democratic hold			

== District 22 ==
2014 Florida's 22nd congressional district election
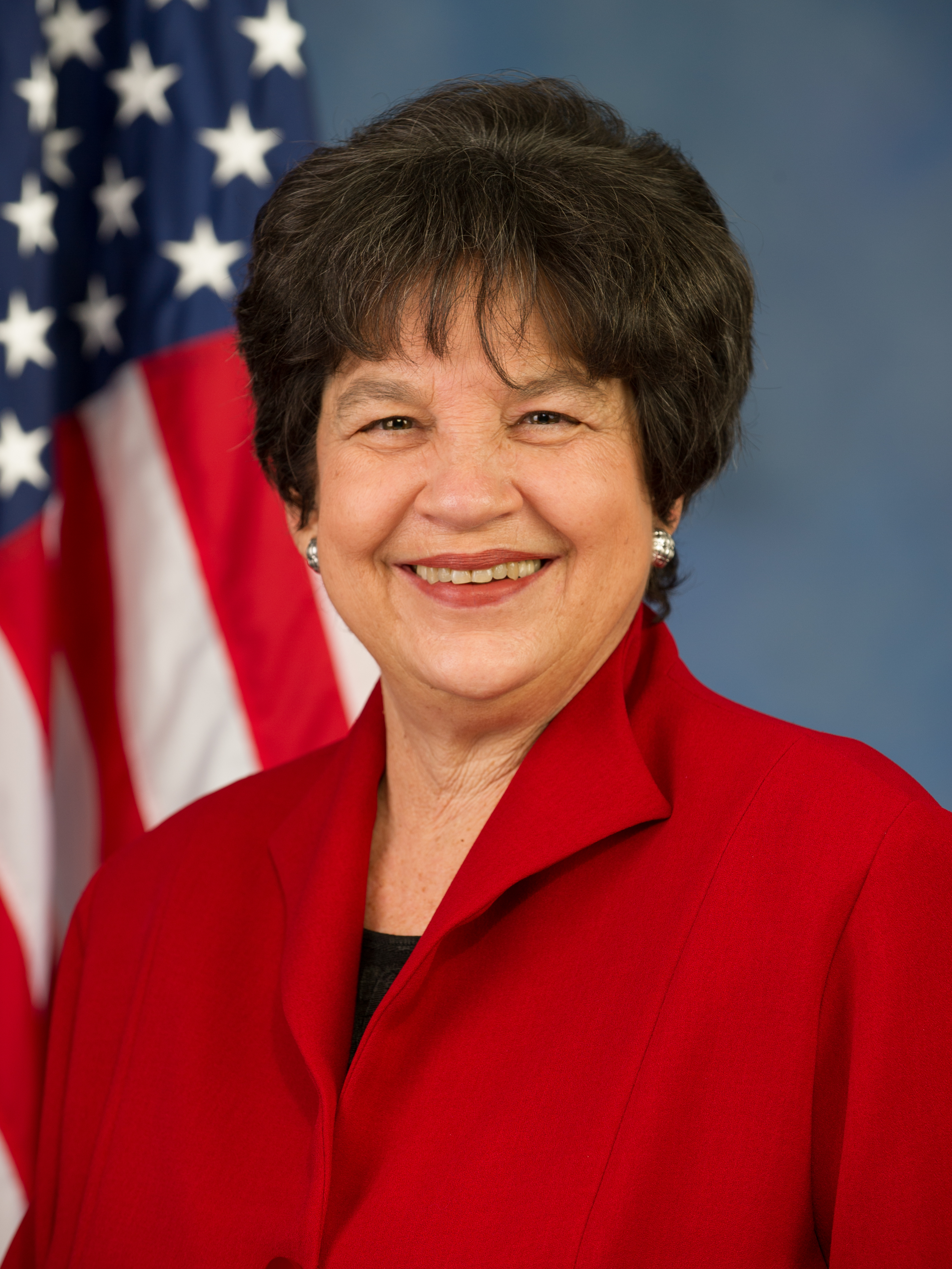

Nominee	Lois Frankel	Paul Spain
Party	Democratic	Republican
Popular vote	125,404	90,685
Percentage	58.0%	42.0%
- County results Frankel: 50–60%
U.S. Representative before election
Lois Frankel
Democratic
Elected U.S. Representative
Lois Frankel
Democratic

Incumbent Democrat Lois Frankel, who had represented the district since 2013, ran for re-election.

=== Democratic primary ===
==== Candidates ====
===== Nominee =====
- Lois Frankel, incumbent U.S. Representative

=== Republican primary ===
==== Candidates ====
===== Nominee =====
- Paul Spain

===== Eliminated in primary =====
- Andrea Leigh McGee
- David Wagie

===== Withdrawn =====
- Jeremy Rodgers

==== Results ====
Republican primary results
Party	Candidate	Votes	%
Republican	Paul Spain	7,492	42.6
Republican	Andrea Leigh McGee	6,073	34.5
Republican	David Wagie	4,017	22.9
Total votes		17,582	100.0

=== General election ===
==== Endorsements ====
Lois Frankel (D)

Labor unions

- AFL-CIO
- International Brotherhood of Boilermakers
- International Brotherhood of Teamsters
- National Association of Letter Carriers

==== Predictions ====
Source	Ranking	As of
The Cook Political Report	Safe D	November 3, 2014
Rothenberg	Safe D	October 24, 2014
Sabato's Crystal Ball	Safe D	October 30, 2014
RCP	Safe D	November 2, 2014
Daily Kos Elections	Safe D	November 4, 2014

==== Results ====
Florida's 22nd congressional district, 2014
Party	Candidate	Votes	%
Democratic	Lois Frankel (incumbent)	125,404	58.0
Republican	Paul Spain	90,685	42.0
Write-in	Raymond Schamis	7	0.0
Total votes		216,096	100.0
Democratic hold			

== District 23 ==
2014 Florida's 23rd congressional district election
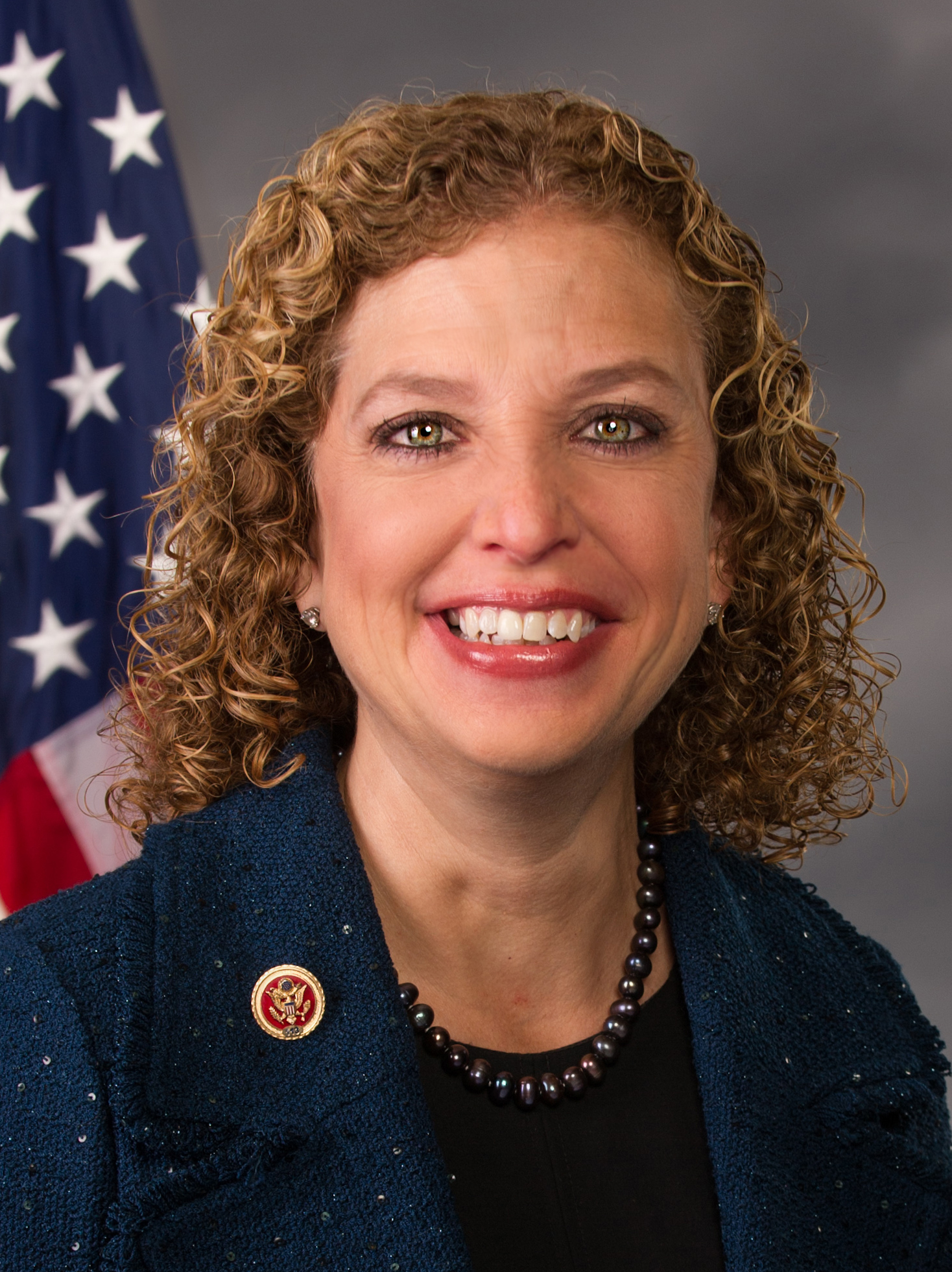

Nominee	Debbie Wasserman Schultz	Joseph "Joe" Kaufman
Party	Democratic	Republican
Popular vote	103,269	61,519
Percentage	62.7%	37.3%
- County results Schultz: 60–70%
U.S. Representative before election
Debbie Wasserman Schultz
Democratic
Elected U.S. Representative
Debbie Wasserman Schultz
Democratic

Incumbent Democrat Debbie Wasserman Schultz, who had represented the district since 2013, ran for re-election. She previously represented the 20th district from 2005 to 2013, prior to the decennial redistricting.

=== Democratic primary ===
==== Candidates ====
===== Nominee =====
- Debbie Wasserman Schultz, incumbent U.S. Representative

=== Republican primary ===
==== Candidates ====
===== Nominee =====
- Joseph Kaufman, founder of Americans Against Hate

===== Eliminated in primary =====
- Juan Garcia

===== Declined =====
- Ed Goldfarb, realtor

==== Results ====
Republican primary results
Party	Candidate	Votes	%
Republican	Joseph "Joe" Kaufman	6,299	62.6
Republican	Juan Garcia	3,764	37.4
Total votes		10,063	100.0

=== General election ===
==== Endorsements ====
Debbie Wasserman Schultz (D)

Labor unions

- AFL-CIO
- International Brotherhood of Boilermakers
- International Brotherhood of Teamsters
- National Association of Letter Carriers

==== Predictions ====
Source	Ranking	As of
The Cook Political Report	Safe D	November 3, 2014
Rothenberg	Safe D	October 24, 2014
Sabato's Crystal Ball	Safe D	October 30, 2014
RCP	Safe D	November 2, 2014
Daily Kos Elections	Safe D	November 4, 2014

==== Results ====
Florida's 23rd congressional district, 2014
Party	Candidate	Votes	%
Democratic	Debbie Wasserman Schultz (incumbent)	103,269	62.7
Republican	Joseph "Joe" Kaufman	61,519	37.3
Total votes		164,788	100.0
Democratic hold			

== District 24 ==
2014 Florida's 24th congressional district election
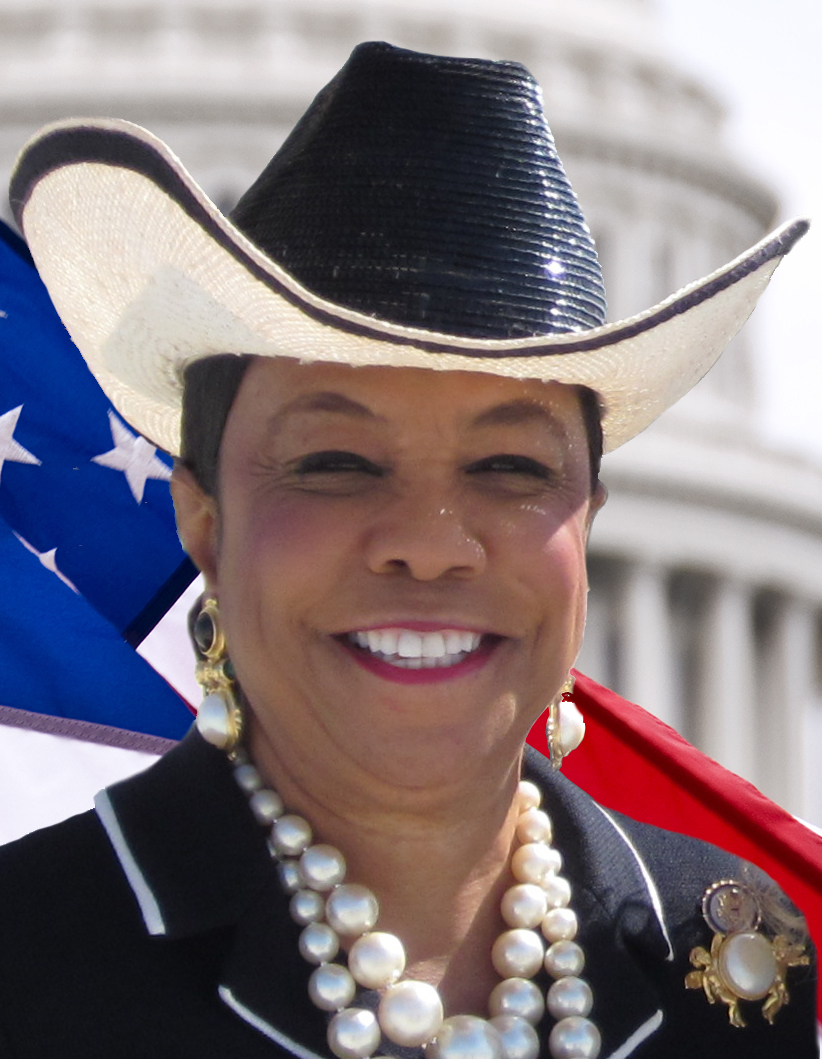

Nominee	Frederica Wilson	Dufirstson Julio Neree
Party	Democratic	Republican
Popular vote	129,192	15,239
Percentage	86.2%	10.1%
- County results Wilson: 80–90%
U.S. Representative before election
Frederica Wilson
Democratic
Elected U.S. Representative
Frederica Wilson
Democratic

Incumbent Democrat Frederica Wilson, who had represented the district since 2013, ran for re-election. She previously represented the 17th district from 2011 to 2013, prior to the decennial redistricting.

=== Democratic primary ===
==== Candidates ====
===== Nominee =====
- Frederica Wilson, incumbent U.S. Representative

===== Eliminated in primary =====
- Michael Etienne

==== Results ====
Democratic primary results
Party	Candidate	Votes	%
Democratic	Frederica Wilson (incumbent)	35,456	80.4
Democratic	Michael A. Etienne	8,628	19.6
Total votes		44,084	100.0

=== Republican primary ===
==== Candidates ====
===== Nominee =====
- Dufirstson Julio Neree

=== General election ===
==== Endorsements ====
Frederica Wilson (D)

Labor unions

- AFL-CIO
- International Brotherhood of Boilermakers
- International Brotherhood of Teamsters
- National Association of Letter Carriers

==== Predictions ====
Source	Ranking	As of
The Cook Political Report	Safe D	November 3, 2014
Rothenberg	Safe D	October 24, 2014
Sabato's Crystal Ball	Safe D	October 30, 2014
RCP	Safe D	November 2, 2014
Daily Kos Elections	Safe D	November 4, 2014

==== Results ====
Florida's 24th congressional district, 2014
Party	Candidate	Votes	%
Democratic	Frederica Wilson (incumbent)	129,192	86.2
Republican	Dufirstson Julio Neree	15,239	10.1
Independent	Luis E. Fernandez	5,487	3.7
Total votes		149,918	100.0
Democratic hold			

== District 25 ==
2014 Florida's 25th congressional district election
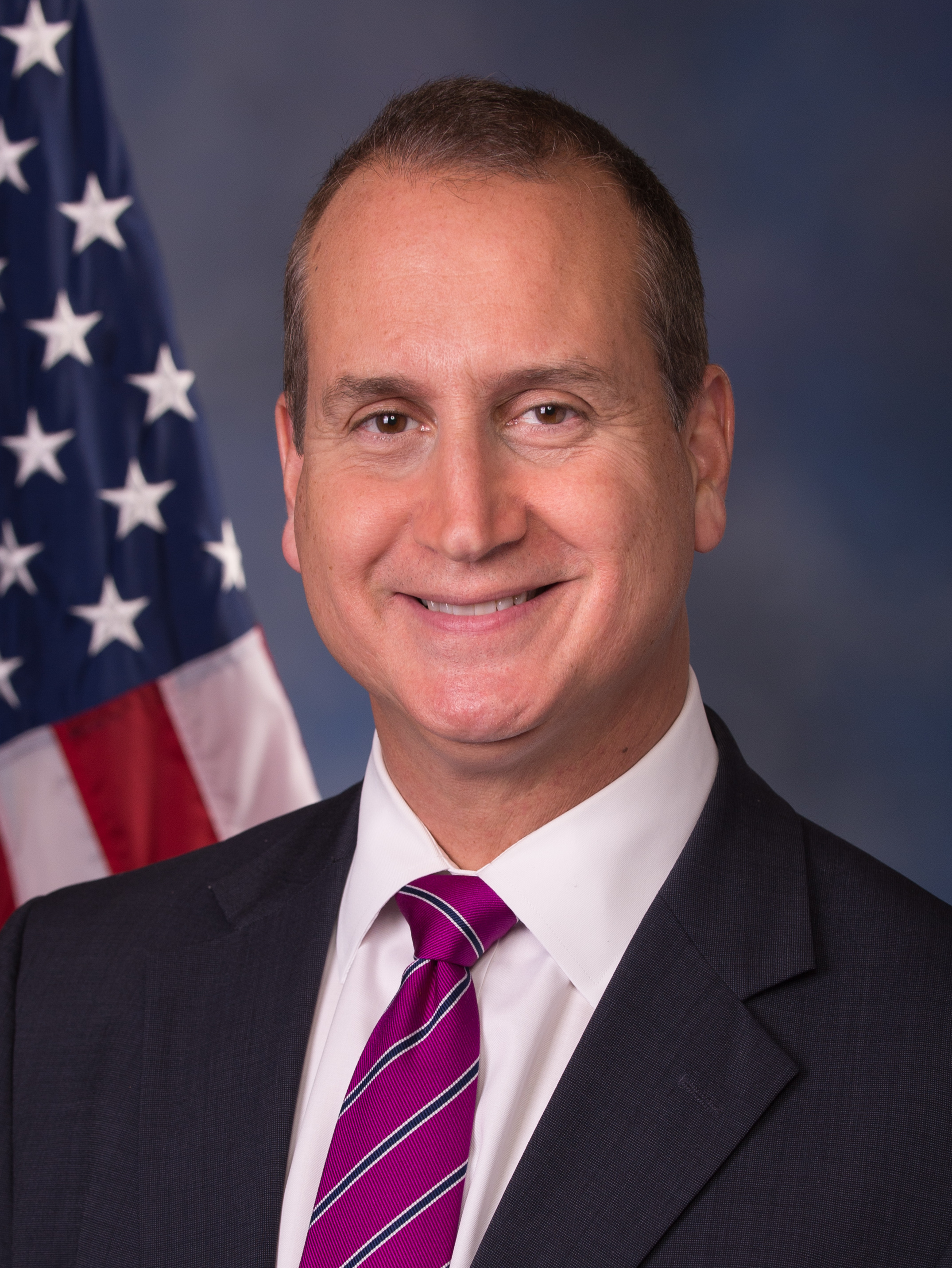
Nominee	Mario Diaz-Balart
Party	Republican
Popular vote	Unopposed
U.S. Representative before election
Mario Diaz-Balart
Republican
Elected U.S. Representative
Mario Diaz-Balart
Republican

Incumbent Republican Mario Diaz-Balart, who had represented the district since 2013, ran for re-election. He previously represented the 21st district from 2011 to 2013, as well as a different version of the 25th from 2003 to 2011, prior to the decennial redistricting.

=== Republican primary ===
==== Candidates ====
===== Nominee =====
- Mario Diaz-Balart, incumbent U.S. Representative

=== General election ===
No candidates filed to challenge Diaz-Balart for his seat, so he returned to office without standing for election.

==== Endorsements ====
Mario Diaz-Balart (R)

Labor unions

- AFL-CIO
- International Brotherhood of Boilermakers

==== Predictions ====
Source	Ranking	As of
The Cook Political Report	Safe R	November 3, 2014
Rothenberg	Safe R	October 24, 2014
Sabato's Crystal Ball	Safe R	October 30, 2014
RCP	Safe R	November 2, 2014
Daily Kos Elections	Safe R	November 4, 2014

==== Results ====
Florida's 25th congressional district, 2014
Party	Candidate	Votes	%
Republican	Mario Diaz-Balart (incumbent)	Unopposed	N/a
Total votes			N/a
Republican hold			

== District 26 ==
2014 Florida's 26th congressional district election
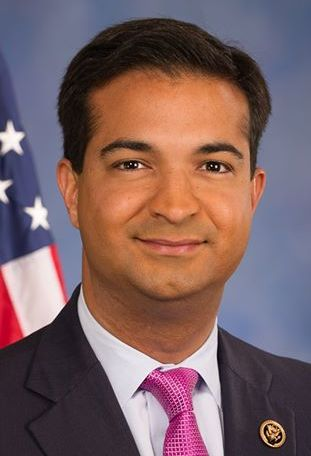

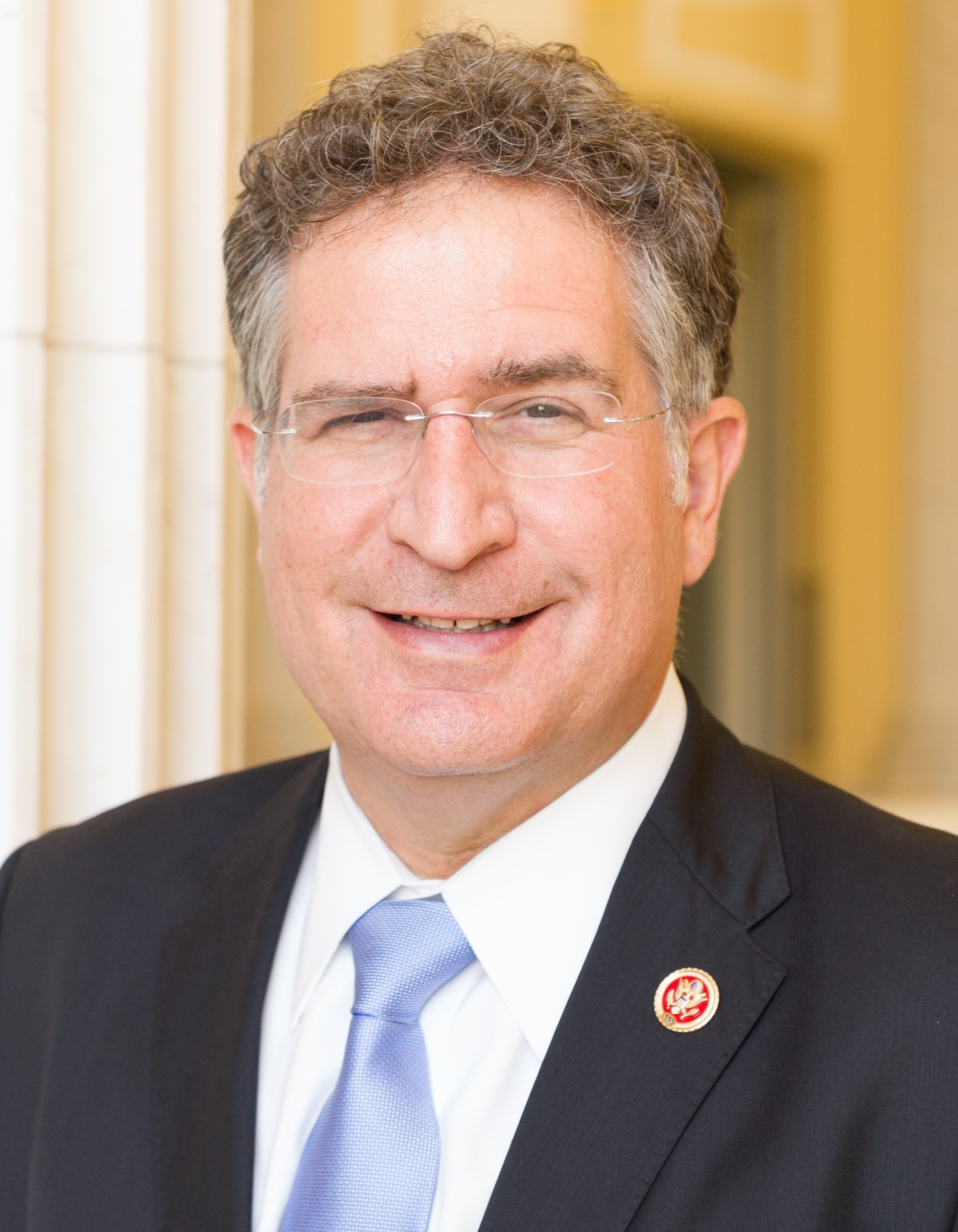
Nominee	Carlos Curbelo	Joe García
Party	Republican	Democratic
Popular vote	83,031	78,306
Percentage	51.5%	48.5%
- County results Curbelo: 50–60% Garcia: 50–60%
U.S. Representative before election
Joe García
Democratic
Elected U.S. Representative
Carlos Curbelo
Republican

Incumbent Democrat Joe García, who had represented the district since 2013, ran for re-election.

=== Democratic primary ===
==== Candidates ====
===== Nominee =====
- Joe García, incumbent U.S. Representative

=== Republican primary ===
==== Candidates ====
===== Nominee =====
- Carlos Curbelo, member of the Miami-Dade County Public School Board

===== Eliminated in primary =====
- Ed MacDougall, Mayor of Cutler Bay
- Joe Martinez, former Miami-Dade County commissioner
- David Rivera, former U.S. Representative
- Lorenzo Palomares Starbuck

===== Declined =====
- Jose Felix Diaz, state representative
- Anitere Flores, state senator

==== Results ====
Republican primary results
Party	Candidate	Votes	%
Republican	Carlos Curbelo	13,861	47.0
Republican	Ed MacDougall	7,455	25.3
Republican	Joe A. Martinez	5,136	17.4
Republican	David Rivera	2,209	7.5
Republican	Lorenzo Palomares Starbuck	824	2.8
Total votes		29,485	100.0

=== General election ===
==== Debate ====
2014 Florida's 26th congressional district debate
No.	Date	Host	Moderator	Link	Democratic	Republican
Key: P Participant A Absent N Not invited I Invited W Withdrawn						
Key: P Participant A Absent N Not invited I Invited W Withdrawn					Joe Garcia	Carlos Curbelo
1	Oct. 18, 2014	WPLG	Glenna Milberg; Michael Putney		P	P

==== Endorsements ====
Joe García (D)

Labor unions

- AFL-CIO
- International Brotherhood of Boilermakers
- International Brotherhood of Teamsters
- National Association of Letter Carriers

Organizations

- Democratic Congressional Campaign Committee "Frontline" Program
- No Labels
Carlos Curbelo (R)

Organizations

- BIPAC
- National Republican Congressional Committee "Young Guns" Program

==== Polling ====
Poll source	Date(s) administered	Sample size	Margin of error	Joe García (D)	Carlos Curbelo (R)	Undecided
Saint Leo University	October 2014	400	± 4.5%	42%	46%	12%
DCCC (D)	September 28–October 1, 2014	400	± 4.8%	45%	40%	15%
McLaughlin (R-Curbelo)	September 9–11, 2014	400	± 4.9%	40%	44%	16%

==== Predictions ====
Source	Ranking	As of
The Cook Political Report	Tossup	November 3, 2014
Rothenberg	Tilt R (flip)	October 24, 2014
Sabato's Crystal Ball	Lean R (flip)	October 30, 2014
RCP	Tossup	November 2, 2014
Daily Kos Elections	Tossup	November 4, 2014

==== Results ====
Florida's 26th congressional district, 2014
Party	Candidate	Votes	%
Republican	Carlos Curbelo	83,031	51.5
Democratic	Joe García (incumbent)	78,306	48.5
Total votes		161,337	100.0
Republican gain from Democratic			

== District 27 ==
2014 Florida's 27th congressional district election
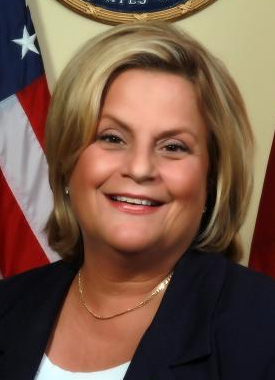
Nominee	Ileana Ros-Lehtinen
Party	Republican
Popular vote	Unopposed
U.S. Representative before election
Ileana Ros-Lehtinen
Republican
Elected U.S. Representative
Ileana Ros-Lehtinen
Republican

Incumbent Republican Ileana Ros-Lehtinen who had represented the district since 2012, ran for re-election. She previously represented the 18th district from 1989 to 2013, prior to the decennial redistricting.

=== Republican primary ===
==== Candidates ====
===== Nominee =====
- Ileana Ros-Lehtinen, incumbent U.S. Representative

=== General election ===
No candidates filed to challenge Ros-Lehtinen for her seat, so she returned to office without standing for election.

==== Endorsements ====
Ileana Ros-Lehtinen (R)

Labor unions

- AFL-CIO
- International Brotherhood of Boilermakers

Organizations

- Susan B. Anthony List

==== Predictions ====
Source	Ranking	As of
The Cook Political Report	Safe R	November 3, 2014
Rothenberg	Safe R	October 24, 2014
Sabato's Crystal Ball	Safe R	October 30, 2014
RCP	Safe R	November 2, 2014
Daily Kos Elections	Safe R	November 4, 2014

==== Results ====
Florida's 27th congressional district, 2014
Party	Candidate	Votes	%
Republican	Ileana Ros-Lehtinen (incumbent)	Unopposed	N/a
Total votes			N/a
Republican hold			

== See also ==
- 2014 United States House of Representatives elections
- 2014 United States elections
