= BIPAC =

- Founded: 1963
- Purpose: Business in politics
- Location: Washington D.C.
- Region served: United States
- Key people: Timothy Riordan (President & CEO)
- Website: bipac.org

BIPAC (Business-Industry Political Action Committee) is a political organization that was founded in 1963, with the stated goal of electing "business-friendly" candidates. It was one of the first political action committees in America.

It primarily endorses Republican candidates, but also endorses some Democratic candidates.

== History ==
BIPAC was founded in 1963 as “a political action arm for American business and industry”.

In August 1963, members of the business community provided seed funding to establish BIPAC with the goal of electing "business-friendly" candidates. The group is not officially affiliated with either political party.

== Operations ==
Several distinct legal entities operate within the framework of BIPAC:

- The Business Institute for Political Analysis is the operations and administrative core of BIPAC. The Institute is a membership organization that does not lobby Congress on issues.
- The Action Fund is the non-connected political action committee of BIPAC, as recognized by the Federal Election Commission. Contributions to the Action Fund can come from individuals and other PACs, but not from corporations.
- BIPAC's Prosperity Project (P2) promotes pro-business politicians to their employees. BIPAC's affiliated state deployment partners (those who officially host the Prosperity Project grassroots initiative in each state) include state Chambers of Commerce.
- The Friends of Adam Smith was established in November 2000 by the Board of Directors of BIPAC along with many of its members. It is charged to research and promote the link between politics, public policy, and economic freedom.

== Initiatives ==
Employees Vote is a get out the vote initiative to encourage private-sector U.S. employees to vote. Employees Vote provides businesses and trade groups.
