= 2014 Florida's 19th congressional district special election =

- June 24, 2014

Florida's 19th congressional district
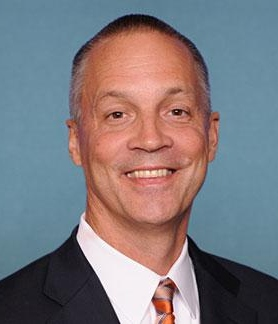

Nominee	Curt Clawson	April Freeman
Party	Republican	Democratic
Popular vote	66,922	29,314
Percentage	66.93%	29.32%
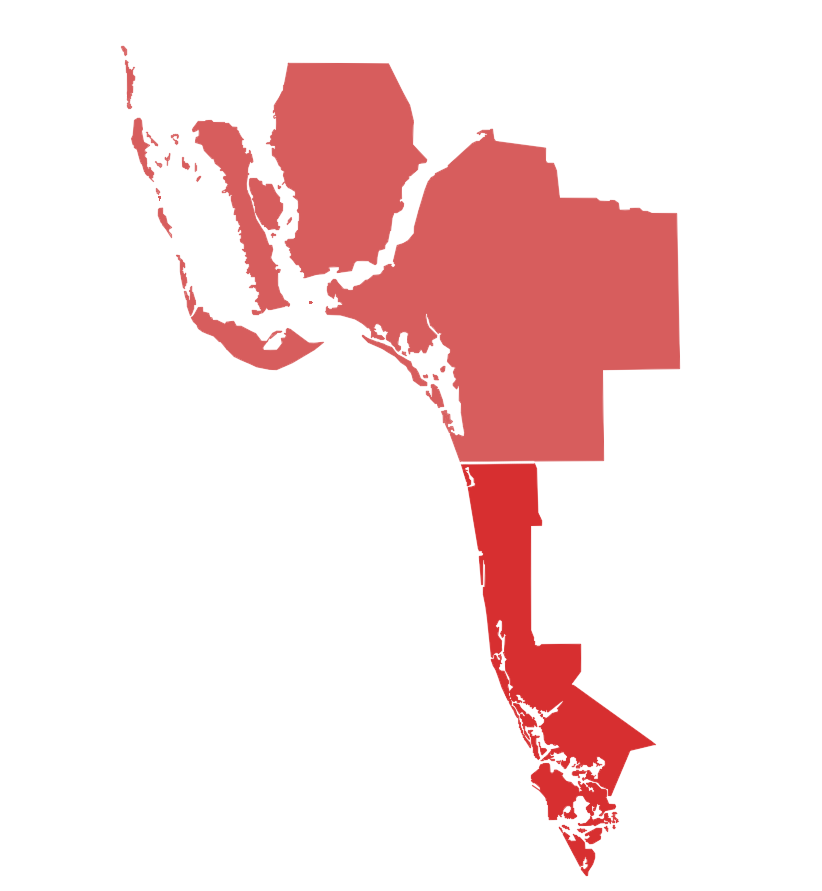
- County results Clawson: 60–70% 70–80%
U.S. Representative before election
Trey Radel
Republican
Elected U.S. Representative
Curt Clawson
Republican

The 2014 special election for Florida's 19th congressional district was held on June 24, 2014, following party primary elections which were held on April 22. The election was held to fill the vacancy caused by the resignation of Trey Radel from the United States House of Representatives. Radel resigned on January 27, 2014, two months after he was arrested for possession of cocaine. Curt Clawson was elected as the new U.S. Representative.

== Background ==
On October 29, 2013, Radel was arrested in the District of Columbia for purchasing 3.5 grams (0.12 oz) of cocaine from an undercover officer. He did not inform House Republicans about the arrest. Less than a month later, Radel pleaded guilty to a misdemeanor count of possession of cocaine and was sentenced to one year of supervised probation. The charge "would have been a felony had it happened in his home state," according to Terry Miller, the Republican chairman in Lee County, Florida.

Radel announced that he would be taking a leave of absence from Congress to undergo addiction rehabilitation and that he would be donating his salary to charity during his absence. Following his announcement, the Republican Party of Florida and Governor Rick Scott called on Radel to "resign immediately" and "focus his attention on rehabilitation and his family". Radel returned to Congress in January 2014, vowing to continue to serve. The House Ethics Committee began an investigation. On January 27, he decided to announce his resignation, effective that evening. Scott set April 22 as the date for the primary election, and June 24 for the general election.

== Republican primary ==
The News-Press described the Republican primary—the real contest in this heavily Republican district—as "a decidedly negative affair, with hyperbolic accusations and character assassination floated freely in television ads, mailers and news stories bombarding Southwest Florida voters." With "no difference on the issues among the three major candidates", Benacquisto, Clawson and Kreegel all attacked each other, with Benacquisto attacked for being "liberal" and an ex-Democrat; Clawson as an uncaring businessman who laid off workers and drove his company into bankruptcy; and Kreegel as a "win-at-all-costs conniver" who violated election laws. Dreikorn, was considered to have little chance and largely refrained from attacking his fellow candidates, calling for an end to the "political infighting".

In April 2014, Benacquisto, Dreikorn and Kreegel attacked Clawson over his links to convicted child molester Glen Borst, who was a childhood friend of Clawson and whose last known address was a house in Utah that Clawson owned. Clawson dismissed the attacks as "politically driven... that just couldn't be further from the truth" and the mother of Borst's victim asked them to stop, calling the politicization of the issue "disturb[ing] and disgust[ing]". Benacquisto, Dreikorn and Kreegel hosted a press conference on April 9 to demand answers from Clawson, who made an impromptu and surprise appearance. After Clawson made his case, all four candidates pledged to stop attacking each other.

Clawson won the primary with 38% of the vote.

=== Candidates ===
==== Declared ====
- Lizbeth Benacquisto, state senator
- Curt Clawson, businessman
- Michael Dreikorn, businessman
- Paige Kreegel, former state representative and candidate for the seat in 2012

==== Declined ====
- Gary Aubuchon, former state representative and candidate for the seat in 2012
- Byron Donalds, banker and candidate for the seat in 2012
- Chauncey Goss, political consultant, candidate for the seat in 2012 and son of former U.S. Representative Porter Goss
- Connie Mack IV, former U.S. Representative and nominee for the U.S. Senate in 2012
- Gary Price, vice mayor of Naples

=== Endorsements ===
Lizbeth Benacquisto

Politicians

- Gary Aubuchon, former state representative and candidate for the seat in 2012
- Diane Black, U.S. Representative (R-TN)
- Matt Caldwell, state representative
- Jason Chaffetz, U.S. Representative (R-UT)
- Mario Díaz-Balart, U.S. Representative (R-FL)
- Dane Eagle, state representative
- Mike Huckabee, former governor of Arkansas
- Sarah Palin, former governor of Alaska and 2008 vice presidential nominee
- Sandra Mortham, former Secretary of State of Florida
- Kathleen Passidomo, state representative
- Garrett Richter, state senator
- Ray Rodrigues, state representative
- Francis Rooney, former United States Ambassador to the Holy See
- Tom Rooney, U.S. Representative (R-FL)
- Aaron Schock, U.S. Representative (R-IL)
- Ann Wagner, U.S. Representative (R-MO) and former United States Ambassador to Luxembourg

Organizations

- Maggie's List
- Susan B. Anthony List
Curt Clawson

Politicians

- Connie Mack IV, former U.S. Representative (R-FL)
- Rand Paul, U.S. Senator (R-KY)
- Michele Bachmann, U.S. Representative (R-MN)

Organizations

- Tea Party Express

=== Polling ===
Poll source	Date(s) administered	Sample size	Margin of error	Lizbeth Benacquisto	Curt Clawson	Michael Dreikorn	Paige Kreegel	Undecided
Public Policy Polling	April 14–16, 2014	669	± 3.8%	19%	38%	18%	17%	7%
St. Pete Polls	April 9, 2014	759	± 3.6%	25.5%	29.8%	11%	21.3%	12.3%

Hypothetical polling

Poll source	Date(s) administered	Sample size	Margin of error	Lizbeth Benacquisto	Chauncey Goss	Paige Kreegel	Connie Mack IV	Undecided
St. Pete Polls	January 27, 2014	1,284	± 2.7%	32.5%	15.3%	9.6%	22.3%	20.3%

=== Results ===
Republican primary results
Party	Candidate	Votes	%
Republican	Curt Clawson	26,897	38.26%
Republican	Lizbeth Benacquisto	18,052	25.68%
Republican	Michael Dreikorn	17,789	25.30%
Republican	Paige Kreegel	7,564	10.76%
Total votes		70,302	100.00%

== General election ==
=== Candidates ===
- Curt Clawson (Republican), businessman
- April Freeman (Democratic), businesswoman and former Republican political activist
- Ray Netherwood (Libertarian)
- Timothy Rossano (write-in)

2022 Florida's 19th congressional district special election results
Party	Candidate	Votes	%
Republican	Curt Clawson	66,922	66.93%
Democratic	April Freeman	29,314	29.32%
Libertarian	Ray Netherwood	3,729	3.73%
Write-ins		24	0.02%
Total votes		99,989	100.00%
Republican hold			

==== By county ====
County	Curt Clawson Republican		April Freeman Democratic		Various candidates Other parties		Margin		Total
County	#	%	#	%	#	%	#	%	Total
Collier (part)	16,866	73.41%	5,328	23.19%	782	3.40%	11,538	50.22%	22,976
Lee (part)	50,056	64.99%	23,986	31.15%	2,971	3.86%	26,070	33.84%	77,013
Totals	66,922	66.92%	29,314	29.32%	3,753	3.75%	37,608	37.60%	99,989
