= Erika Donalds =

First lady designate of Florida(born 1980)

- Donalds at AmericaFest 2025

First Lady of Florida
- Designate
- Assuming role January 5, 2027
- Governor: Byron Donalds
- Preceded by: Casey DeSantis

Personal details
- Born: Erika Brynne Lees; August 13, 1980 (age 46) Florida, U.S.
- Party: Republican
- Spouse: Byron Donalds (m. 2003)
- Children: 3
- Education: Florida State University (BS); Florida Atlantic University (MS)
- Occupation: Education entrepreneur; Policy advocate; Financial executive
- Website: Official website

Erika Brynne Donalds (née Lees; born August 13, 1980) is an American education entrepreneur who primarily focuses on school choice advocacy in Florida. She leads education policy at the America First Policy Institute. Her husband, Byron Donalds, is the governor-elect of Florida.

== Early life and education ==
Donalds holds a bachelor's degree from Florida State University (2002) and a master's degree from Florida Atlantic University (2006) in accounting.

== Career ==
Donalds worked for New York investment management firm Dalton, Greiner, Hartman, Maher & Co., LLC (DGHM) from 2002 until 2018.

=== Education activism ===
In 2013, following a dispute with administrators of her second child's public school in Naples, Donalds placed her child in a private school. She became involved in local efforts (via the group Parents ROCK) to deploy state education funds to establish a charter school, the Mason Classical Academy.

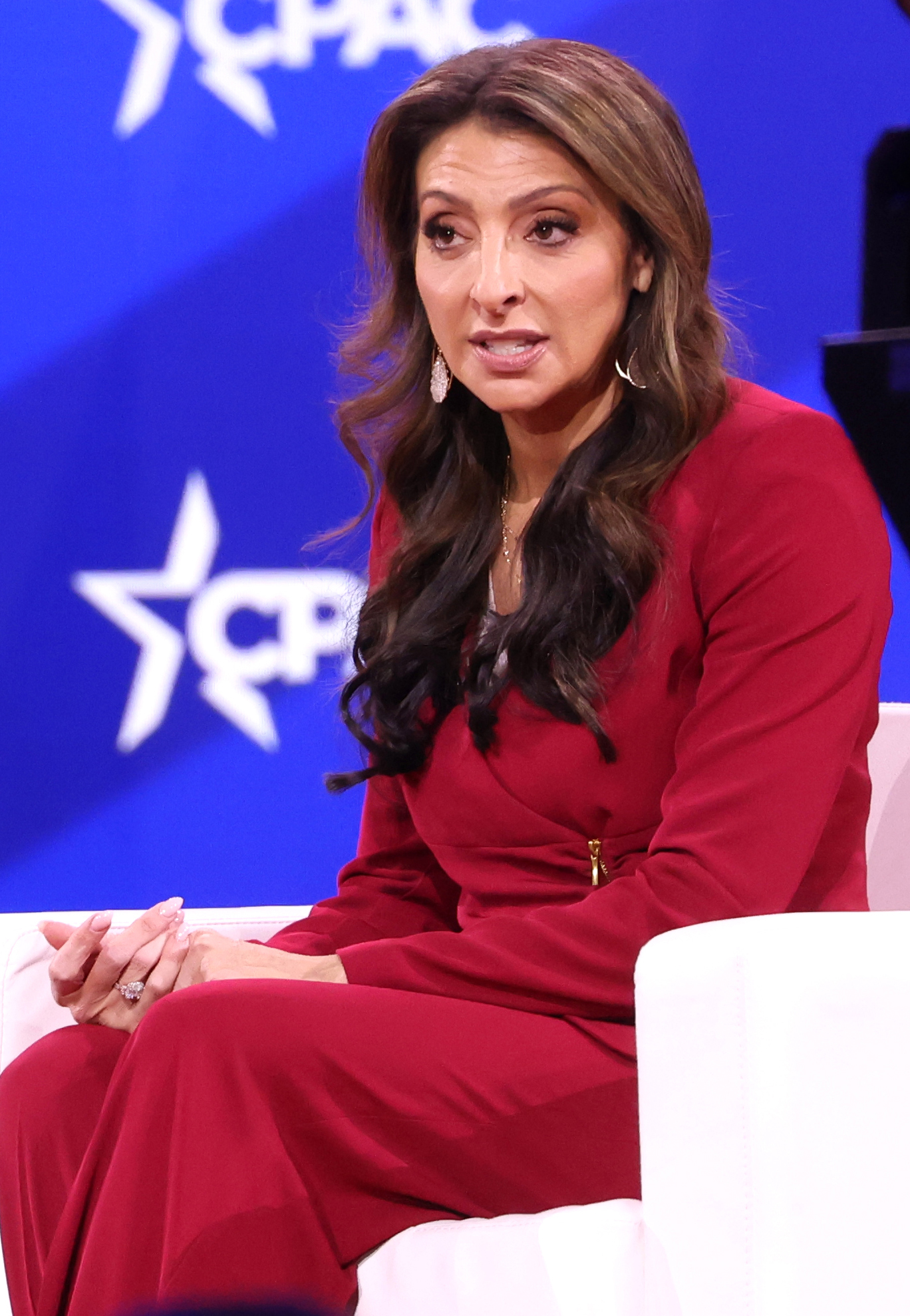
Donalds at the 2025 Conservative Political Action Conference

Donalds was named by Florida House of Representatives Speaker Richard Corcoran to the 2017-2018 Constitution Revision Commission. Governor Ron DeSantis appointed her to the Advisory Committee on Education and Workforce Development and the Florida Gulf Coast University Board of Trustees.

In 2017, Donalds founded OptimaEd, a company that provides management support for several classical charter schools in Florida.

Donalds currently leads education policy at the America First Policy Institute. As of 2023, she was a visiting fellow at The Heritage Foundation and served on the advisory boards of Classical Learning Test, Moms for Liberty, and the Independent Women's Forum Education Freedom Center.

In October 2025, Donalds embarked on a campus speaking tour with the Leadership Institute. Calling the U.S. education system "wasteful, bureaucratic, monopolistic", she advocated for privatizing the student loan system and increasing the number of groups administering standardized testing.

== Personal life ==
She married Byron Donalds on March 15, 2003. They have three children and live in Naples, Florida.

== See also ==
- School choice in Florida
- Step Up For Students
