= Trey Radel =

American politician (born 1976)

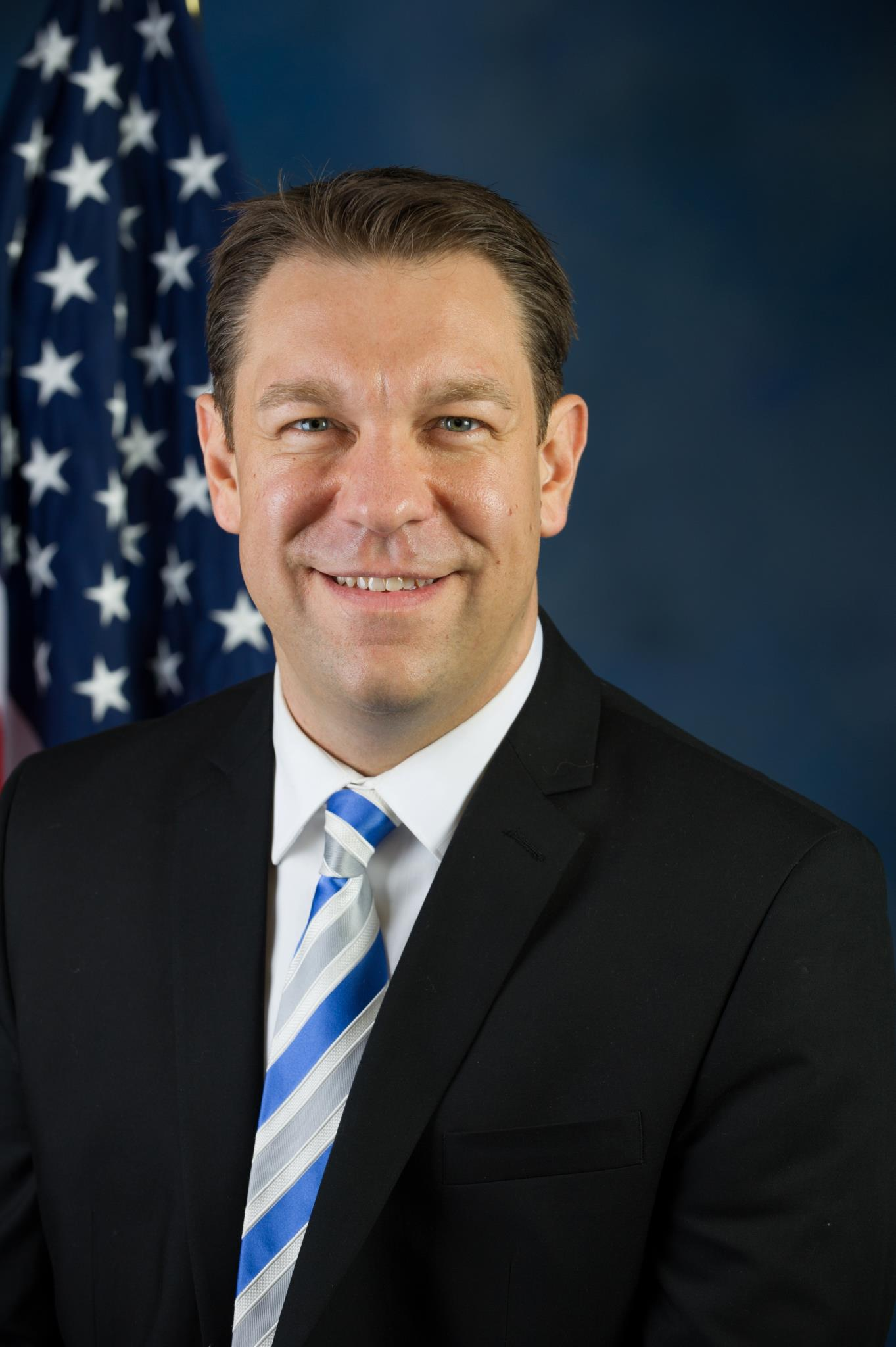
- Official portrait, 2013

Member of the U.S. House of Representatives from Florida's 19th district
- In office January 3, 2013 – January 27, 2014
- Preceded by: Connie Mack IV (redistricted)
- Succeeded by: Curt Clawson

Personal details
- Born: Henry Jude Radel III; April 20, 1976 (age 50) Cincinnati, Ohio, U.S.
- Party: Republican
- Spouse: Amy Wegmann
- Children: 3
- Education: Loyola University Chicago (BA)
- Website: Official website

Henry Jude “Trey” Radel III (born April 20, 1976) is an American radio personality, political commentator, author, actor, and former member of the United States House of Representatives. Radel’s show airs on the Florida-based station WFSX-FM, a Fox News Radio affiliate.

A member of the Republican Party, Radel was elected to the House of Representatives in 2012. He defeated 5 other candidates, including future Republican representative Byron Donalds, in the Republican primary and soundly defeated Jim Roach in the general election.

On January 27, 2014, Radel resigned from the House of Representatives after being convicted 3 months earlier of possession of cocaine. He was succeeded by Republican Curt Clawson in the subsequent special election.

== Early life and education ==
Radel was born in 1976 in Cincinnati, Ohio, the son of Kathleen (Sollinger) and Henry Jude Radel, Jr. He attended Elder High School. Radel majored in communications and minored in Italian at Loyola University Chicago.

== Media career ==
Radel began his career as a journalist, working as both an anchor and a reporter. He interned for CNN at its headquarters in Atlanta. Radel then worked for CBS affiliates KHOU in Houston, WBBM in Chicago, and WINK-TV in Fort Myers, Florida.

In 2005, Radel bought the Naples Journal, a community newspaper that he later sold to the E.W. Scripps Company, the owner of Naples Daily News. In 2007, after selling the Journal, Radel returned to WINK, leaving in 2009 to host a live, 4-hour long morning radio show on WFSX-FM.

Radel would return to the station in September 2016 to host mornings. A year later, he moved to afternoon drive time, the time slot he hosts today.

=== Writing ===
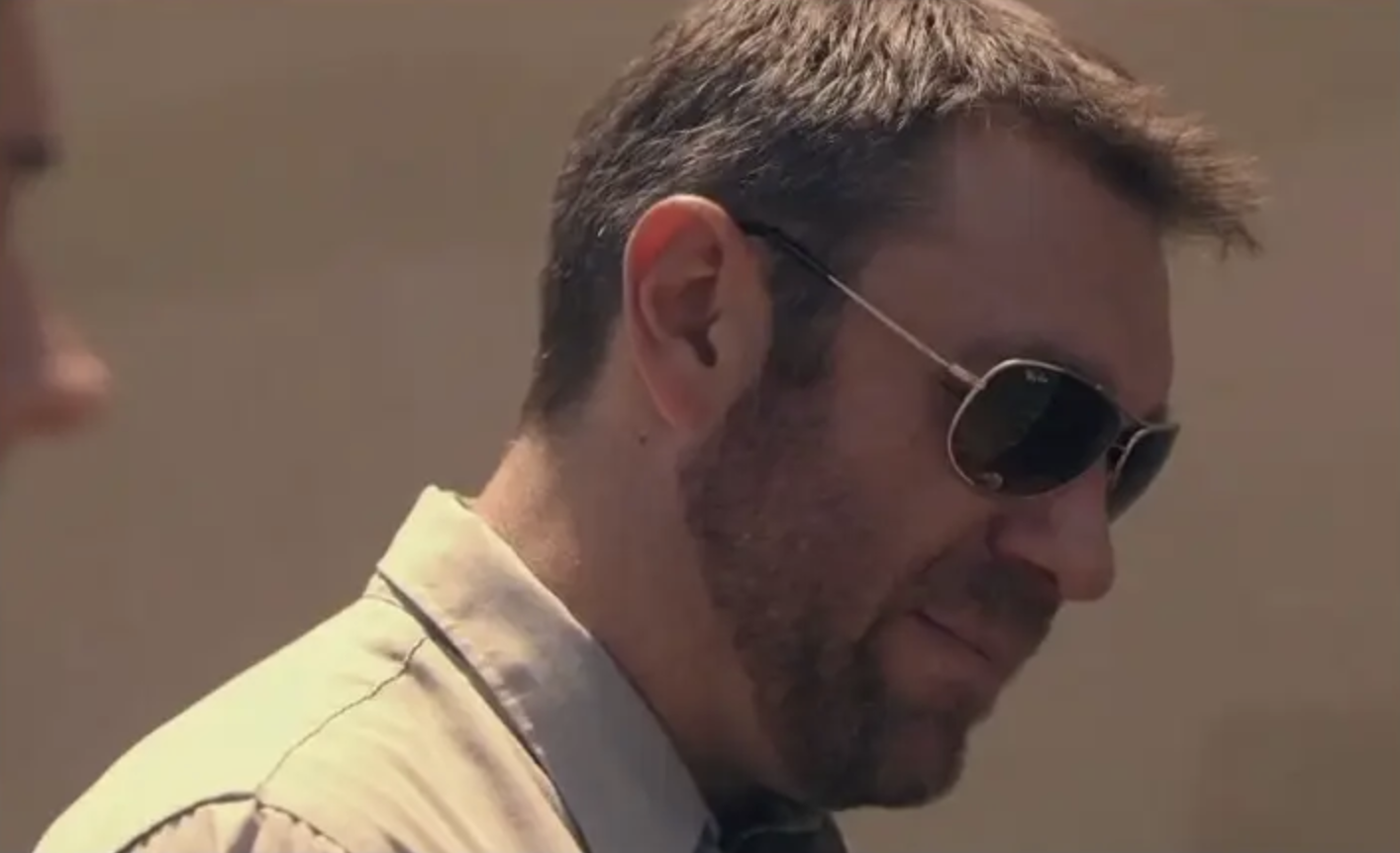
Trey Radel on Set of The Truth Is Stranger Than Florida on The Discovery Network

On March 28, 2017, Blue Rider Press, an imprint of the Random House company, released Radel’s book, Democrazy, a True Story of Weird Politics, Money, Madness, and Finger Food. The book was reviewed by HuffPost as "a brutally honest, outrageous memoir" which exposes "how the Washington sausage really gets made.” Along with former New York Governor George Pataki, Radel co-authored Beyond the Great Divide: How a Nation Became a Neighborhood. The book was published by Post Hill Press and described as, “An unprecedented, insider view into 9/11 and the inner workings of the political climate that emerged after the attacks.”

=== Acting ===
Radel was trained as an actor and a comedian and performed improvisational work at Second City in Chicago.

In 2016, Radel started what would become a recurring role as a TV news anchor on the show StartUp, which debuted on the Sony-owned app Crackle and was later purchased and streamed on Netflix. He also played the lead, starring as a detective, in the series Truth is Stranger than Florida on the Investigation Discovery network. Radel’s most recent role was on the Disney+ series, The Right Stuff, produced by Leonardo DiCaprio. He played the part of a reporter.

== U.S. House of Representatives ==
Radel represented Florida's 19th congressional district from January 3, 2013 through January 27, 2014, and was sworn into the 113th United States Congress. The district is located in Southwest Florida and includes Fort Myers, Naples and Cape Coral.

=== Election ===
Incumbent Republican Representative Connie Mack IV decided not to run for reelection to his seat, in order to challenge Democratic U.S. Senator Bill Nelson. Radel decided to run in the open seat, which had been renumbered as the 19th District. Five other Republican candidates also filed to run.

Controversy occurred when it was discovered that the campaign committee "Friends of Trey Radel, Inc." had purchased his opponents' domain names nearly a year before he announced he was going to run for office. When this was revealed, his campaign committee created websites and attached them to his opponents' domain names, purportedly for the purpose of disseminating the voting records of the opponents, which were posted on the websites.

Radel's political philosophy is conservative, but he nevertheless has said he supports the principles of the DREAM Act. Radel was endorsed by the incumbent Connie Mack IV, former U.S. Senator Connie Mack III, and former New York City Mayor Rudy Giuliani. Chauncey Goss (who finished second to Radel in the primary) was endorsed by U.S. Congressman Paul Ryan. Radel won the primary with 30% of the vote, primarily on the strength of his showing in his native Lee County. His primary campaign featured a "Tea Party-tinged" message.

In the general election, Radel faced Democrat Jim Roach of Cape Coral, a retired GM research engineer and Vietnam veteran. Radel was heavily favored to win because 19th has long been reckoned as one of the most Republican districts in Florida. Radel won the 2012 election with 63% of the vote.

=== Conviction and resignation ===
On October 29, 2013, Radel was arrested in the District of Columbia after attempting to buy 3.5 grams of cocaine from an undercover federal officer. Less than a month later, Radel pleaded guilty to a misdemeanor count of possession of cocaine and was sentenced to one year of supervised probation.

Following his conviction for cocaine possession, Radel went on a self-imposed leave of absence to undergo addiction rehabilitation, announcing that he would be donating his salary to charity during his absence. Radel stopped short of resigning. The Republican Party of Florida and Governor Rick Scott called for his resignation. On January 27, 2014, Radel announced he would resign from Congress. He had not voted in Congress after November 15, 2013 in the wake of the conviction. In late January 2014, Radel officially tendered his resignation in a letter to Speaker of the House John Boehner. Republican businessman Curt Clawson won the special general election held on June 24, 2014 to replace him.

Radel completed all conditions of his probation in October 2014, and he successfully petitioned the court to expunge his criminal record.

=== Committee assignments ===
- Committee on Foreign Affairs
  - Subcommittee on the Middle East and South Asia
  - Subcommittee on the Western Hemisphere
- Committee on Transportation and Infrastructure
  - Subcommittee on Aviation
  - Subcommittee on Coast Guard and Maritime Transportation
  - Subcommittee on Railroads, Pipelines, and Hazardous Materials

== Filmography ==
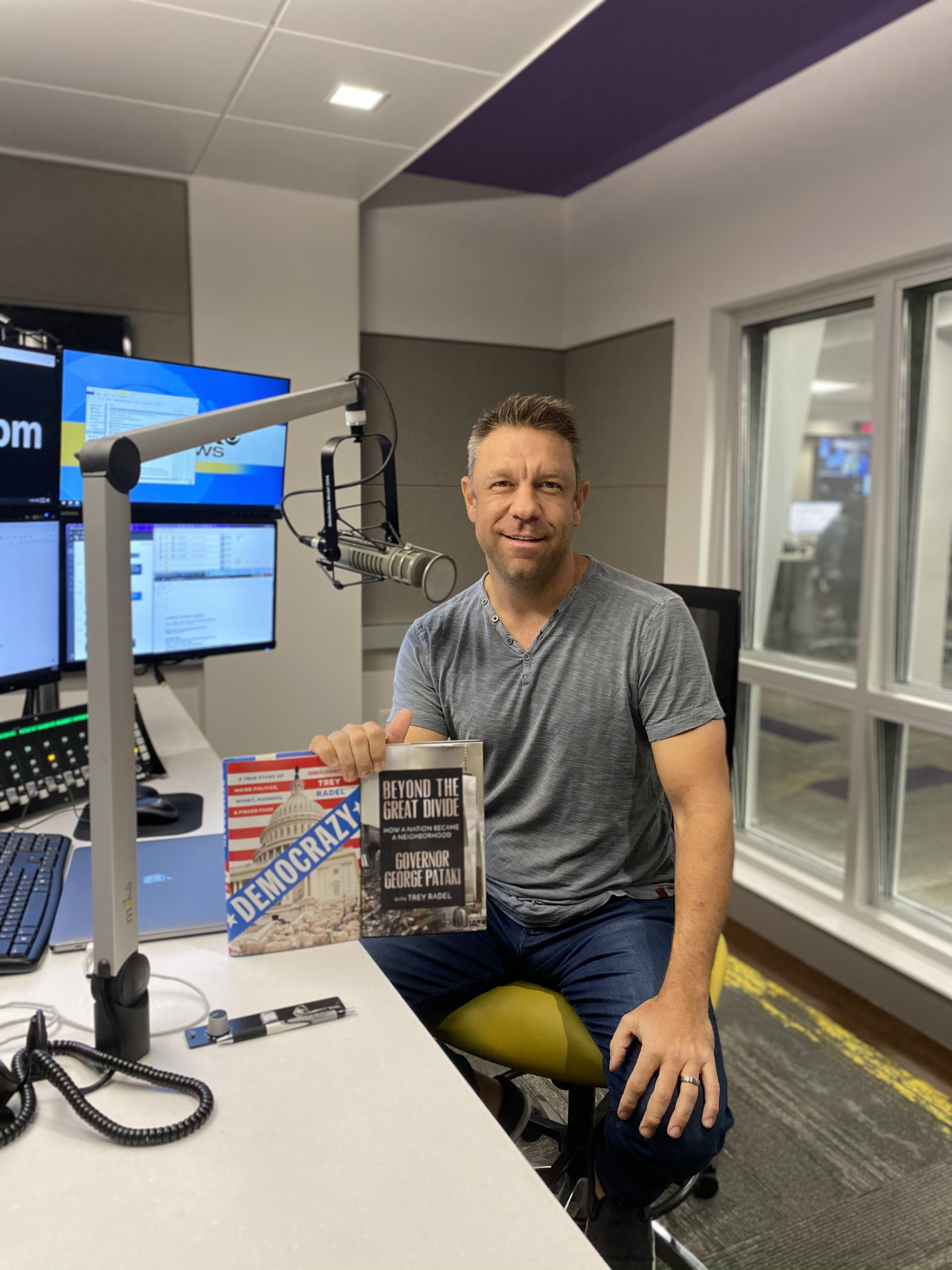
Radel at a book signing, 2020

=== Television ===
Year	Title	Role	Notes
2016	Truth is Stranger than Florida	Lead detective	Television show
2016–2017	StartUp	TV news anchor	Web series
2020	The Right Stuff	Reporter 1	Television show

== Electoral history ==
=== 2012 ===
2012 Florida's 19th congressional district Republican primary
Party	Candidate	Votes	%
Republican	Trey Radel	22,284	30.0%
Republican	Chauncey Goss	15,994	21.5%
Republican	Paige Kreegel	13,148	17.7%
Republican	Gary Aubuchon	11,486	15.5%
Republican	Byron Donalds	10,376	14.0%
Republican	Joe Davidow	1,026	1.4%
Total votes		74,314	100.00

2012 Florida's 19th congressional district general election
Party	Candidate	Votes	%
Republican	Trey Radel	189,833	62.0%
Democratic	Jim Roach	109,746	35.8%
Independent	Brandon Smith	6,637	2.2%
Total votes		303,216	100.00

== Personal life ==
Radel is married to Amy Wegmann, an anchor for WFTX-TV in Fort Myers. They have three children, and live in Fort Myers. Radel is also fluent in Spanish.

=== Nonprofit work ===
Radel, along with his wife, founded a nonprofit organization called the U.S. Forces Fund, which focuses on helping injured soldiers returning home from abroad. Radel also works with the local Harry Chapin Food Bank.

== See also ==
- List of American federal politicians convicted of crimes
- List of federal political scandals in the United States

U.S. House of Representatives
Preceded by Ted Deutch	Member of the U.S. House of Representatives from Florida's 19th congressional district 2013–2014	Succeeded by Curt Clawson
U.S. order of precedence (ceremonial)
Preceded by Brenda Jones as Former U.S. Representative	Order of precedence of the United States as Former U.S. Representative	Succeeded by Shelley Sekula-Gibbs as Former U.S. Representative
