= Francis Rooney =

American politician and diplomat (born 1953)

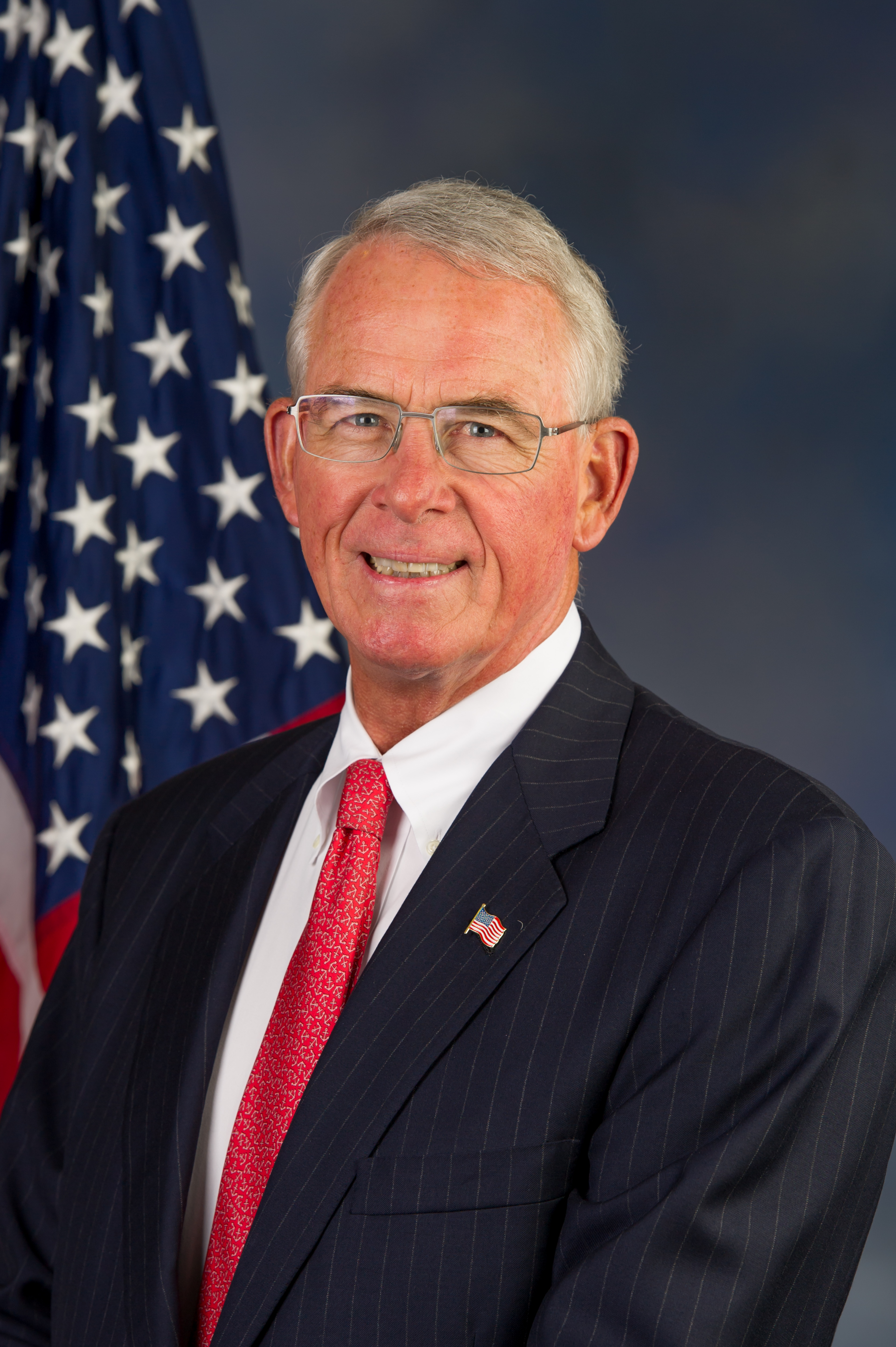
- Official portrait, 2017

Member of the U.S. House of Representatives from Florida's 19th district
- In office January 3, 2017 – January 3, 2021
- Preceded by: Curt Clawson
- Succeeded by: Byron Donalds

7th United States Ambassador to the Holy See
- In office November 12, 2005 – January 10, 2008
- President: George W. Bush
- Preceded by: Jim Nicholson
- Succeeded by: Mary Ann Glendon

Personal details
- Born: Laurence Francis Rooney III; December 4, 1953 (age 72) Muskogee, Oklahoma, U.S.
- Party: Republican
- Spouse: Kathleen Collins (m. 1976)
- Children: 3
- Education: Georgetown University (BA, JD)

Laurence Francis Rooney III (born December 4, 1953) is an American politician and diplomat who was a U.S. representative for Florida's 19th congressional district from 2017 to 2021. A Republican, he served as the U.S. ambassador to the Holy See from 2005 until 2008. Rooney earned a 95.90% lifetime score from the American Conservative Union.

Rooney is chairman of Rooney Holdings, formerly known as Rooney Brothers Company, an investment and holding company based in Naples, Florida. With a net worth of $22.6 million, Rooney had been one of the wealthiest members of Congress.

On October 19, 2019, Rooney announced that he would not run for re-election to Congress in 2020. He was succeeded by state representative Byron Donalds.

== Early life and education ==
Born in Muskogee, Oklahoma, he is the oldest child of Laurence Francis and Lucy Turner Rooney's six children. Rooney graduated from Georgetown Preparatory School. He earned a Bachelor of Arts degree from Georgetown University in 1975 and a Juris Doctor from the Georgetown University Law Center in 1978.

== Career ==
=== Business ventures ===
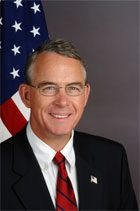
Rooney as Ambassador

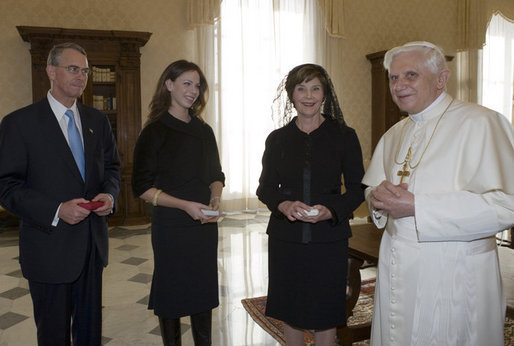
Rooney with Pope Benedict XVI, First Lady Laura Bush, and Barbara Bush in 2006

Rooney served as the chief executive officer and President at Rooney Holdings, Inc. from 1984 to 2016 and presently serves as Chairman. Rooney and his family own Manhattan Construction Group, which includes Manhattan Construction Company; he represents the fourth generation of the Rooney family to own the company. Manhattan Construction Company built AT&T Stadium, Globe Life Field, Choctaw Stadium (once Globe Life Park and Texas Rangers Ballpark), the BOK Center, the Smoothie King Center (once New Orleans Sports Arena), and NRG Stadium (once Reliant Stadium), the United States Capitol Visitor Center at the United States Capitol, the original Oklahoma State Capitol in Guthrie, and work at the relocated Oklahoma State Capitol in Oklahoma City including adding the Dome in 2002 and the interior restoration completed in 2022, the U.S. Army Medical Research Institute of Infectious Diseases (USAMRIID) Replacement Project, the Cato Institute Headquarters and Walter Reed Army Institute of Research Phases I and II, and multiple projects at Dallas/Fort Worth International Airport, George Bush Intercontinental Airport, and Southwest Florida International Airport. The company built the George H. W. Bush Presidential Library & Museum and the George W. Bush Presidential Center earning it the distinction as the only construction company to have built two presidential libraries.

=== Central America ===
Rooney was a member of the advisory board of the Panama Canal Authority from 2002-2005 and 2008-2016. He was among the U.S. delegation led by Colin Powell to the inauguration of Panamanian president Martín Torrijos. Rooney is a member of the Inter-American Dialogue.

=== Political fundraising ===
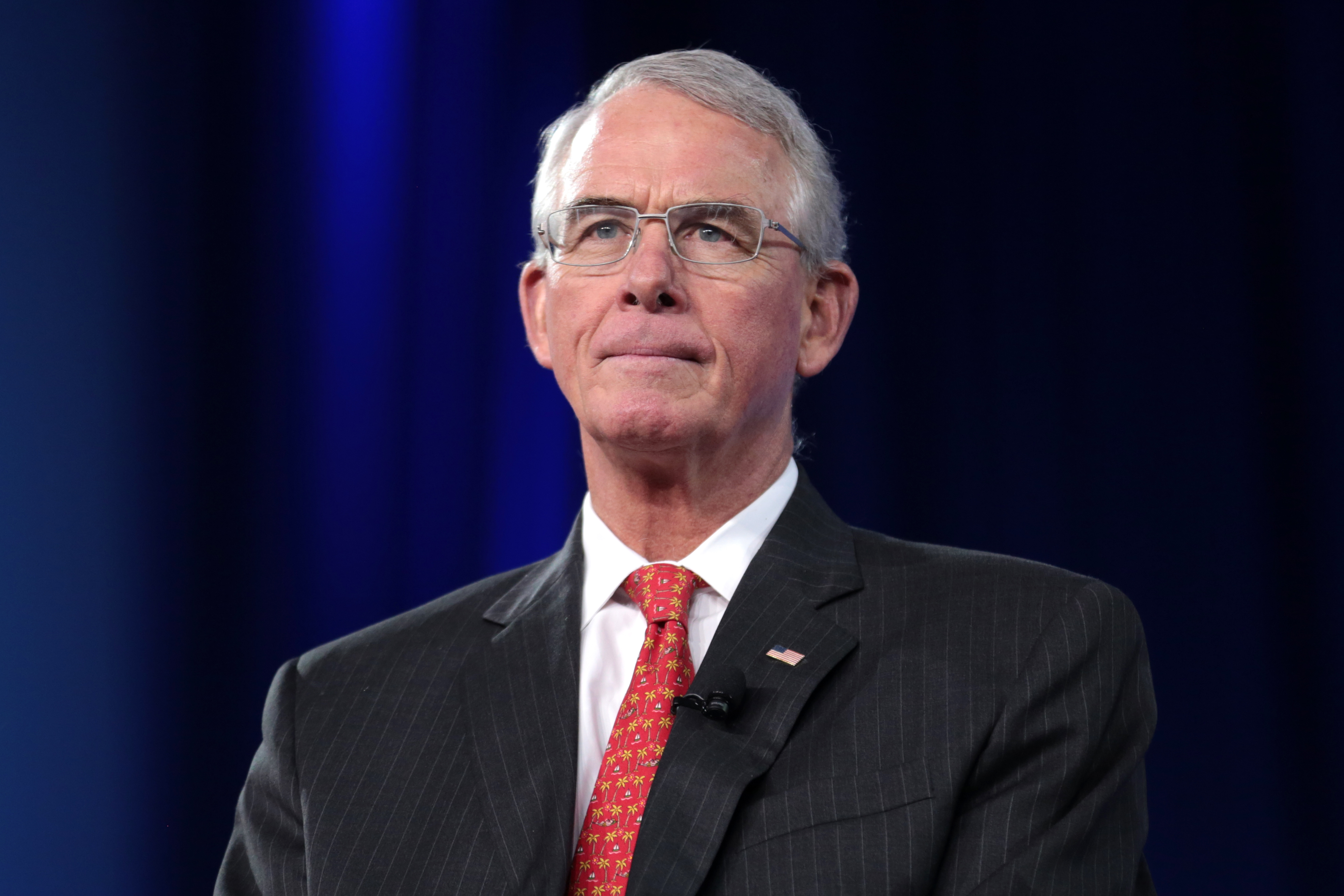
Rooney at CPAC in 2017

Rooney is a major Republican donor, having contributed to the campaign of George W. Bush. Rooney served on the fundraising team of Connie Mack IV. Rooney donated $1 million to Restore Our Future, Mitt Romney's Super PAC, and Rooney hosted a fundraiser for Romney in Rooney's Naples, Florida home. In 2015, Rooney gave over $2 million to Jeb Bush's Super PAC.

== U.S. House of Representatives ==
=== 2016 campaign ===
In May 2016, incumbent Republican congressman Curt Clawson announced he would not run for a third full term. Soon afterward, Rooney entered the Republican primary to succeed him—the real contest in this heavily Republican district. Rooney spent $4 million of his own money and far outspent his opponents in an election that was shortened due to the timing of Clawson's late announcement. In the August 30 primary, he defeated Sanibel Councilman Chauncey Goss and radio personality Dan Bongino. Rooney received an unprecedented endorsement from Rick Scott, who is his neighbor in the Naples, Florida Port Royal community. As expected, he won handily in the November general election to become only the fifth person to represent this district since its creation in 1983 (it had been the 13th District from 1983 to 1993, the 14th from 1993 to 2013, and the 19th since 2013).

=== Tenure ===
Rooney was sworn in on January 3, 2017. He was a member of the conservative Republican Study Committee and the Climate Solutions Caucus.

In 2017, Rooney proposed the Pell Performance Act, alongside Ralph Norman, which proposes that Pell Grants turn into Stafford loans if students fail to graduate college within six years of being awarded the grant.

=== Committee assignments ===
- Committee on Education and the Workforce
  - Subcommittee on Workforce Protections
  - Subcommittee on Health, Employment, Labor, and Pensions
- Committee on Foreign Affairs
  - Subcommittee on Europe, Eurasia and Emerging Threats
  - Subcommittee on the Western Hemisphere
- Joint Economic Committee

== Political positions ==
=== Education ===
Rooney is in favor of having Pell Grants turn into Stafford Loans if students who were awarded the grants do not graduate within six years of receiving their award.

=== Healthcare ===
Rooney wants to repeal the Affordable Care Act (Obamacare) and calls it "an experiment that didn't work." He voted for the American Health Care Act of 2017.

=== Gun policy ===
As of 2017, Rooney has a "B" rating from the NRA Political Victory Fund, indicating a voting record that generally supports gun rights. As a Congressman, Rooney has voted in favor of several pieces of legislation to expand gun rights, including a yes vote on H. R. 38 (the Concealed Carry Reciprocity Act), which would enable concealed carry reciprocity among all States if and when it is signed into law.

In March 2017, Rooney voted in favor of the Veterans Second Amendment Protection Act, which, if signed into law, will allow veterans who are considered "mentally incompetent" to purchase ammunition and firearms unless declared a danger by a judge. Rooney also voted in favor of H.J.Res.40, which successfully used the Congressional Review Act to block the implementation of an Obama-era Amendment to the NICS Improvement Amendments Act of 2007 that was aimed at preventing the mentally-infirm from legally purchasing firearms.

Following the 2018 Stoneman Douglas High School shooting, Rooney announced a proposal to limit mass shootings. The proposal includes supporting the Fix NICS Act of 2017, mandating background checks for every firearm purchase, and enacting a gun violence restraining order system to provide a legal justification for temporarily confiscating firearms from those deemed a threat to themselves or others. Rooney also supports a mandatory 3-day waiting period for all gun sales, a ban on bump stocks, and raising the minimum age to purchase any firearm to 21. Additionally, his proposal included making schools more secure and hiring veterans and retired law enforcement officers as armed security guards for schools. Rooney has also expressed support for the controversial idea of arming teachers to confront school shooters. However, in response to questions on if he would support reinstating the Federal Assault Weapons Ban, Rooney replied, "How willing are we to throw the Constitution out the window?" Rooney has stated that his support of any new gun control legislation is contingent on the inclusion of a rider of the Concealed Carry Reciprocity Act of 2017.

=== Federal Bureau of Investigation ===
Rooney attracted national attention in December 2017 when he expressed frustration with FBI officials who investigated President Donald Trump and suggested that the Federal Bureau of Investigation be purged of "politically compromised" agents. Rooney's statements aligned him closely with Trump.

=== Economic issues ===
==== Tax reform ====
Rooney favors tax reform and voted in favor of the Tax Cuts and Jobs Act of 2017.

=== Environmental issues ===
==== Climate change ====
On November 28, 2018, Rooney co-introduced the Energy Innovation and Carbon Dividend Act of 2018, saying, "To let the free market price out coal, we should consider value pricing carbon. A revenue-neutral carbon fee is an efficient, market-driven incentive to move toward natural gas and away from coal, and to support emerging alternate sources of energy." He also cosponsored the 2019 version of the bill.

In an op-ed published on Politico in September 2019, Rooney declared, "I’m a conservative Republican and I believe climate change is real. It’s time for my fellow Republicans in Congress to stop treating this environmental threat as something abstract and political and recognize that it’s already affecting their constituents in their daily lives." However, his voting record has not always been so pro-environment. He has voted to delay enactment of ozone standards, and to repeal a rule requiring energy companies to reduce waste and emissions.

==== Arctic Refuge drilling ====
Although he voted in favor of the Tax Cuts and Jobs Act of 2017, which authorized drilling for oil in the Arctic National Wildlife Refuge, in September 2019 he was the only House Republican who voted in favor of a bill that would repeal this authorization.

=== International issues ===
==== Immigration and refugees ====
Rooney is in favor of immigration reform. He has spoken out against Deferred Action for Childhood Arrivals. At the time of Rooney's stated position on DACA, a large majority of American citizens were in support of the program, including according to an August 31 through September 3, 2017 poll where 57% of self-identified as Republican voters.

=== Social issues ===
==== Abortion ====
Rooney is opposed to terminating an unwanted pregnancy starting as early as conception. He is against using federal funding to pay for abortions or fund Planned Parenthood.

== Honors ==
In April 2016, he was awarded the John Carroll Award by Georgetown University. In November 2020, he was inducted into the Oklahoma Hall of Fame and in June 2022, he was inducted into the Order of Isabela la Catolica.

Rooney holds honorary degrees from the University of Notre Dame (2006), the University of Dallas (2010), Seton Hall University (2021), and Ave Maria School of Law (2022).

== Controversies ==
=== Laredo Petroleum ===
Rooney sat on the board of the Tulsa, Oklahoma based petroleum and natural gas exploration and production company, Laredo Petroleum that was accused in 2012 of underpaying royalties to landowners of property where the company was conducting operations. The lawsuit, filed by Chieftain Royalty Company, alleged that "Laredo used its position as operator and as an oil and gas working interest owner to secretly underpay royalty due plaintiff and class members on production of gas and its constituents from the Oklahoma Well," and the company had been "unjustly enriched." Rooney owns 1 million shares of Laredo Petroleum and has been on the board since 2010. Despite denying the allegations made in the lawsuit, Laredo settled the claim for $6.6 million.

=== Deep state comments ===
Rooney has made statements suggesting that he believes in the existence of a deep state in the United States. In a December 26, 2017, MSNBC interview, Rooney, called into question the integrity of the FBI and Justice Department, who were conducting an investigation into Russian State interference in the 2016 elections and any possible collusion between Russia and the Donald Trump presidential campaign along with any related crimes, alluded to a "deep state", presumably seeking to undermine the Trump presidency. Rooney stated there ought to be a "purge" within those departments. Rooney suggested this is evidenced by there having been isolated incidents among members of those agencies who were documented as having been demoted or, where relevant, removed from the Mueller probe for having expressed anti-Trump bias or pro-Hillary Clinton bias.

== Personal life ==
Rooney is Roman Catholic.

== See also ==
- Manhattan Building

Diplomatic posts
Preceded by Jim Nicholson	United States Ambassadors to the Holy See; 2005–2008	Succeeded by Mary Ann Glendon
U.S. House of Representatives
Preceded by Curt Clawson	Member of the U.S. House of Representatives from Florida's 19th congressional district 2017–2021	Succeeded by Byron Donalds
U.S. order of precedence (ceremonial)
Preceded by Carlos Curbelo as Former U.S. Representative	Order of precedence of the United States as Former U.S. Representative	Succeeded by Sheila Cherfilus-McCormick as Former U.S. Representative
