= Curt Clawson =

American politician (born 1959)

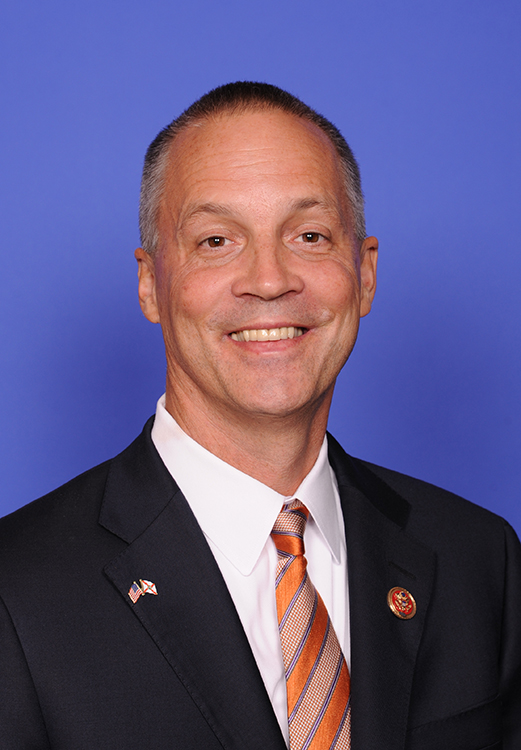
- Official portrait, 2014

Member of the U.S. House of Representatives from Florida's 19th district
- In office June 24, 2014 – January 3, 2017 (Note: Clawson's official service begins on the date of the special election, while he was not sworn in until June 25, 2014.)
- Preceded by: Trey Radel
- Succeeded by: Francis Rooney

Personal details
- Born: Curtis Jay Clawson; September 28, 1959 (age 66) Tacoma, Washington, U.S.
- Party: Republican
- Education: Purdue University (BA, BS); Harvard University (MBA)
- Basketball career

No. 33 – Purdue Boilermakers
- Position: Point guard / shooting guard
- League: Big Ten Conference

Personal information
- Listed height: 6 ft 5 in (1.96 m)

Career information
- High school: Batesville High School, Indiana
- College: University of Utah (1978–1979); Purdue University (1981–1984)

Career highlights
- 1× Big Ten Conference Champion (1984); 2× All–Academic Big Ten (1983, 1984)

Curtis Jay Clawson (born September 28, 1959) is an American businessman, former collegiate athlete, and politician who served two terms as the United States representative for Florida's 19th congressional district from 2014 to 2017, serving as a Republican. He is the former chief executive of Hayes Lemmerz, a Michigan-based automobile wheel and brakes supplier.

Clawson was elected to the House of Representatives in a special election in 2014, defeating Democrat April Freeman in a landslide. He was elected to a full term in 2014, defeating Freeman a second time.

Clawson did not seek a third term in 2016, and was succeeded by Francis Rooney.

== Early life and education ==
Clawson attended Batesville High School in Batesville, Indiana. A high school basketball star, he was recruited by Gene Keady. At Purdue, he was a 2× All-Academic Big Ten selection (1982–83 and 1983–84). He was a team captain for the 1983–84 Big Ten Champions, was a member of 2× NCAA teams (1982–83 and 1983–84) and an NIT Finalist team (1981–82). He graduated in 1984 with a BA in Spanish and a BS from the Krannert School of Management. He was named a "Purdue Old Master" in 2010 and received the Distinguished Alumni Award in 2014.

In 1990, he earned an MBA from Harvard University.

== U.S. House of Representatives ==
=== Elections ===
2014 special

Clawson was the Republican Party nominee in a special election to fill the seat being vacated by Trey Radel. and won the election on June 24, 2014. In the April 22, 2014 Republican primary—the real contest in this heavily Republican district—Clawson defeated State Senate Majority Leader Lizbeth Benacquisto and former State Representative Paige Kreegel with 38% of the vote to Benacquisto's 26% and Kreegel's 25%. Clawson was endorsed in the primary by the Tea Party Express. He spent $2 million on advertising and in one of his ads he challenged U.S. President Barack Obama to a game of one on one basketball.

2014 general

Clawson won a full term in November 2014 with 64 percent of the vote.

=== Tenure ===
Clawson delivered the Tea Party response to President Obama's State of the Union Address in 2015.

On May 20, 2016, Clawson announced that he would not seek re-election that year, citing his desire to support his father in the aftermath of his mother's death the previous year.

Clawson was a member of the Congressional Constitution Caucus.

== Electoral history ==
=== 2014 (special) ===
Republican primary results
| Party | Candidate | Votes | % |
|---|---|---|---|
| Republican | Curt Clawson | 26,857 | 38 |
| Republican | Lizbeth Benacquisto | 18,032 | 26 |
| Republican | Paige Kreegel | 17,762 | 25 |
| Republican | Michael Dreikorn | 7,560 | 11 |
| Total votes | | 70,211 | 100 |

Florida's 19th Congressional District special election, 2014
| Party | Candidate | Votes | % |
|---|---|---|---|
| Republican | Curt Clawson | 66,922 | 66.9 |
| Democratic | April Freeman | 29,314 | 29.3 |
| Libertarian | Ray Netherwood | 3,729 | 3.7 |
| Write-In | Timothy J. Rossano | 24 | 0.0 |
| Total votes | | 99,989 | 100.0 |

=== 2014 ===
Florida's 19th Congressional District Election (2014)
| Party | Candidate | Votes | % |
|---|---|---|---|
| Republican | Curt Clawson* | 159,354 | 64.6 |
| Democratic | April Freeman | 80,824 | 32.7 |
| Libertarian | Ray Netherwood | 6,671 | 2.7 |
| Write-In | Timothy J. Rossano | 12 | 0.0 |
| Total votes | | 246,861 | 100.0 |

U.S. House of Representatives
| Preceded by Trey Radel | Member of the U.S. House of Representatives from Florida's 19th congressional district 2014–2017 | Succeeded by Francis Rooney |
U.S. order of precedence (ceremonial)
| Preceded by David Jolly as Former U.S. Representative | Order of precedence of the United States as Former U.S. Representative | Succeeded by Gwen Graham as Former U.S. Representative |
