= Opportunity Scholarship Program =

Opportunity Scholarship Program may refer to:

- School voucher programs
- The D.C. Opportunity Scholarship Program, a voucher program that served approximately 2,000 students in Washington D.C.
- The Florida Opportunity Scholarship Program, a voucher program in Florida
