= Byron Donalds =

Governor-elect of Florida (born 1978)

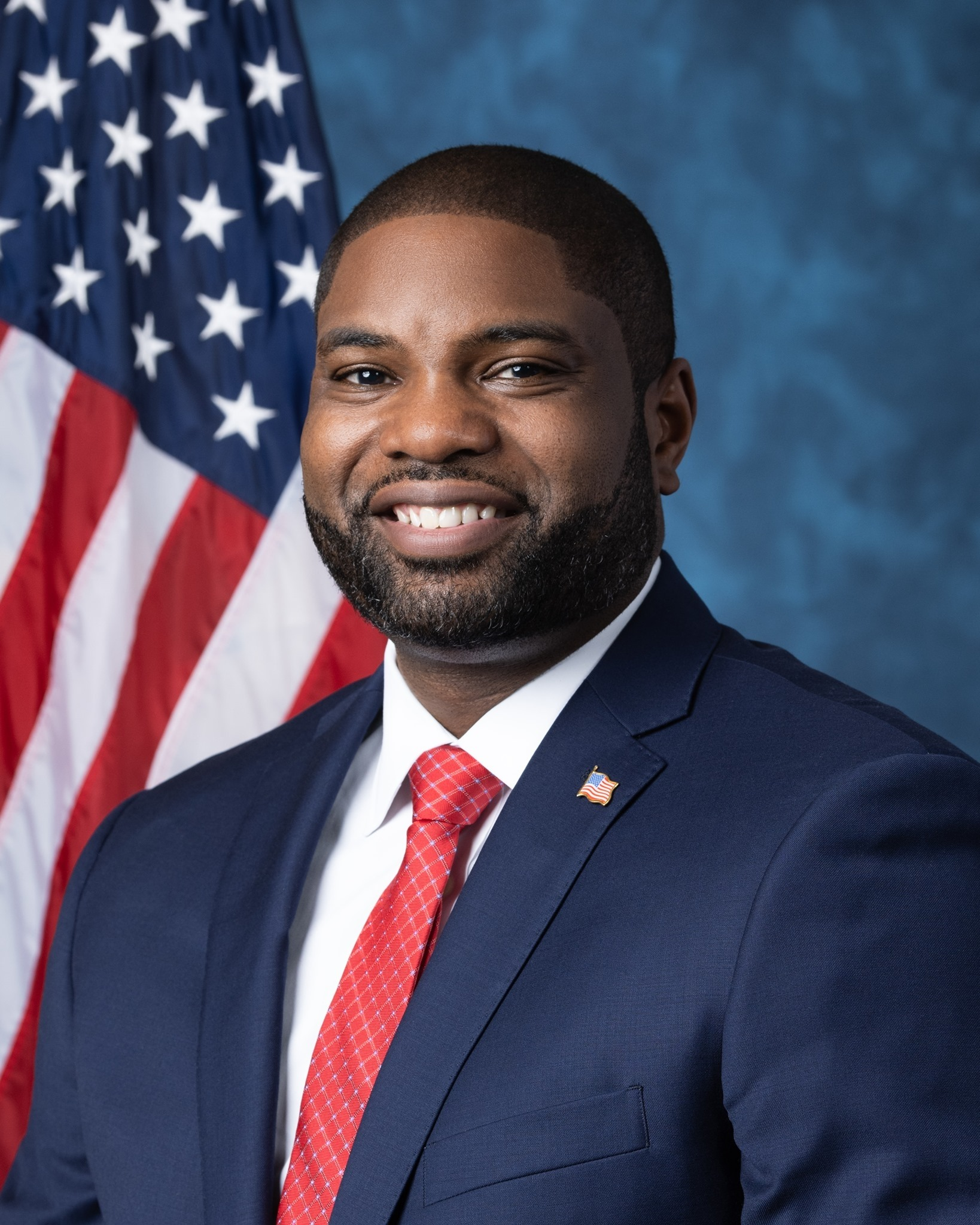
- Official portrait, 2021

Governor-elect of Florida
- Assuming office January 5, 2027
- Lieutenant: Bryan Avila (elect)
- Succeeding: Ron DeSantis

Member of the U.S. House of Representatives from Florida's 19th district
- Incumbent
- Assumed office January 3, 2021
- Preceded by: Francis Rooney

Member of the Florida House of Representatives from the 80th district
- In office November 8, 2016 – November 3, 2020
- Preceded by: Matt Hudson
- Succeeded by: Lauren Melo

Personal details
- Born: Byron Lowell Donalds; October 28, 1978 (age 48) New York City, New York, U.S.
- Party: Republican (since 2010)
- Other political affiliations: Democratic (before 2010)
- Spouses: Bisa Hall (m. 1999; div. 2002); Erika Lees (m. 2003)
- Children: 3
- Education: Florida State University (BS)
- Website: House website; Campaign website
- Donalds' voice Donalds opposing the Restaurant Revitalization Fund Replenishment Act of 2021. Recorded April 7, 2022

Byron Lowell Donalds (born October 28, 1978) is an American politician who is the governor-elect of Florida. Donalds has served as the U.S. representative for Florida's 19th congressional district since 2021. His congressional district includes much of Southwest Florida. From 2016 to 2020, he served in the Florida House of Representatives. A member of the Republican Party, Donalds was elected governor of Florida in the 2026 Florida gubernatorial election, becoming the first African-American elected to the position.

Born and raised in Crown Heights, Brooklyn, Donalds attended Florida A&M University before earning a Bachelor of Arts degree in finance and marketing from Florida State University in 2002. Before entering politics, he worked in the finance, insurance, and banking industries. Situated in the conservative or MAGA wing of the Republican Party, Donalds was a member of the Tea Party movement.

Donalds was elected to the Florida House of Representatives in 2016, representing the 80th district for two terms before being elected to Congress in 2020. He was reelected in 2022 and 2024. During his second congressional term, he was a nominee for Speaker of the House in the roll-call votes of January 2023 and October 2023. Donalds became the Republican nominee for governor of Florida in August 2026, and faced Democratic nominee David Jolly in the general election. Donalds is set to be Florida's first Black governor. Along with Keisha Lance Bottoms of Georgia, he will be among the first Black governors in the South since Reconstruction. (Note: The first elected Black governor was Douglas Wilder of Virginia. He was elected in 1989.) He will also be the first elected Black Republican governor in the United States.

== Early life and education ==
Byron Lowell Donalds was born and raised in the Crown Heights neighborhood in the New York City borough of Brooklyn. One of three children, he was raised by his single mother. In 1996, Donalds graduated from Nazareth Regional High School in East Flatbush. Donalds is of Jamaican and Panamanian heritage.

In 1997, Donalds was charged with marijuana possession, but the charges were dropped as part of a pre-trial diversion program, and he was fined $150 (equivalent to $300 in 2025). In 2000, he pleaded no contest to a felony theft charge for allegedly attempting to defraud a bank (by depositing a bad check), but his record was later sealed and expunged. According to an attorney consulted by the fact-checking site PolitiFact, "Donalds would not have been able to get his record expunged if the state considered him a convicted felon." In 2014, Donalds completed an application to serve on the board of Florida SouthWestern State College without disclosing his previous arrests. An ethics complaint about the omission was dismissed.

Donalds attended Florida A&M University, subsequently transferring to Florida State University. In 2002, he graduated from FSU with a Bachelor of Science degree in finance and marketing.

=== Early career ===
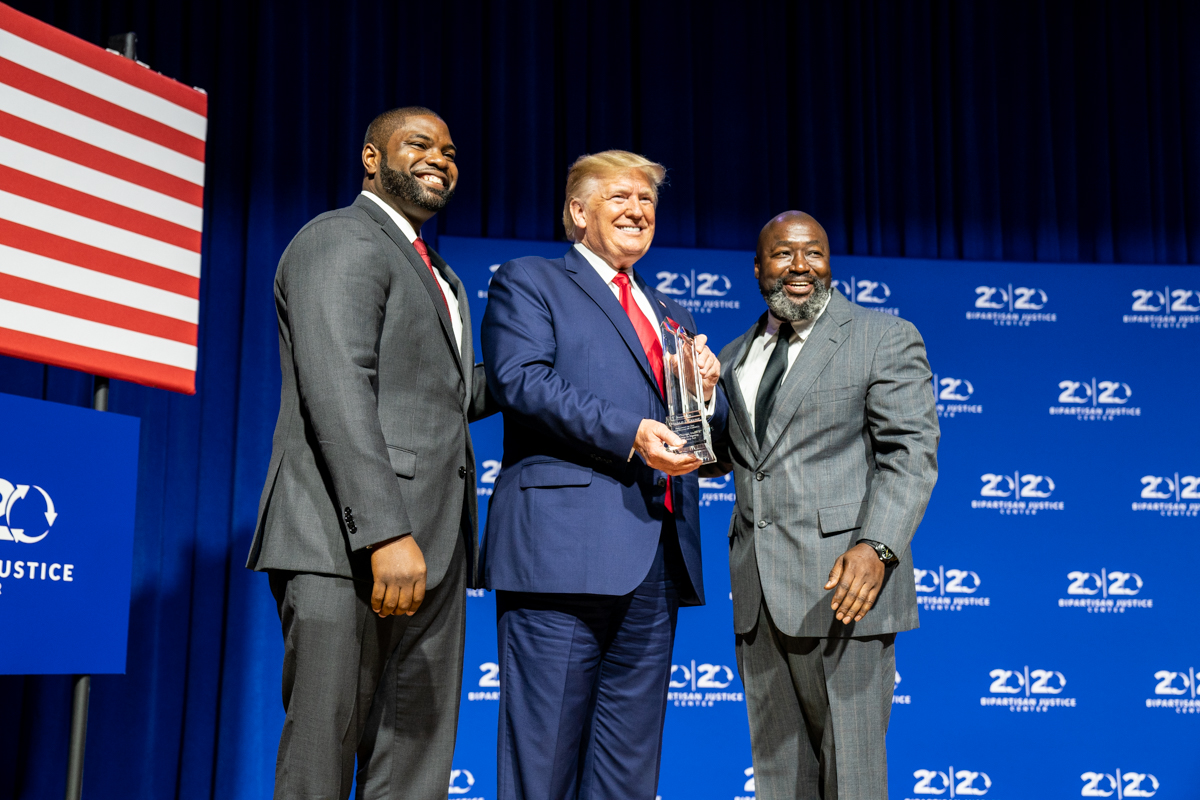
Donalds and President Donald Trump in 2019 with a former inmate freed by the First Step Act

Donalds began his professional career in 2003 as a credit analyst at TIB Bank. He was promoted to senior credit analyst in 2004, and later promoted to commercial credit manager, assistant vice president, and credit manager. Donalds left TIB Bank in 2007 and took a position as a portfolio manager at CMG Surety LLC. In 2015, he joined Wells Fargo Advisors as a financial advisor.

== Florida House of Representatives (2016–2020) ==
In 2010, Donalds left the Democratic Party and joined the Republican Party. After becoming involved in the Tea Party movement, he was encouraged to run for office. Over time, he became part of the MAGA wing of the Republican Party.

In 2012, Donalds was a candidate for the U.S. House of Representatives in Florida's 19th congressional district. He finished fifth of six candidates. In 2014, he was reported as a likely candidate for the U.S. House in Florida's 19th congressional district after Trey Radel resigned, but did not run.

Donalds was elected to the Florida House of Representatives for District 80 in 2016. During his Florida House tenure, he chaired the Insurance and Banking Subcommittee.

== U.S. House of Representatives (2021–present) ==
=== Elections ===
==== 2020 ====
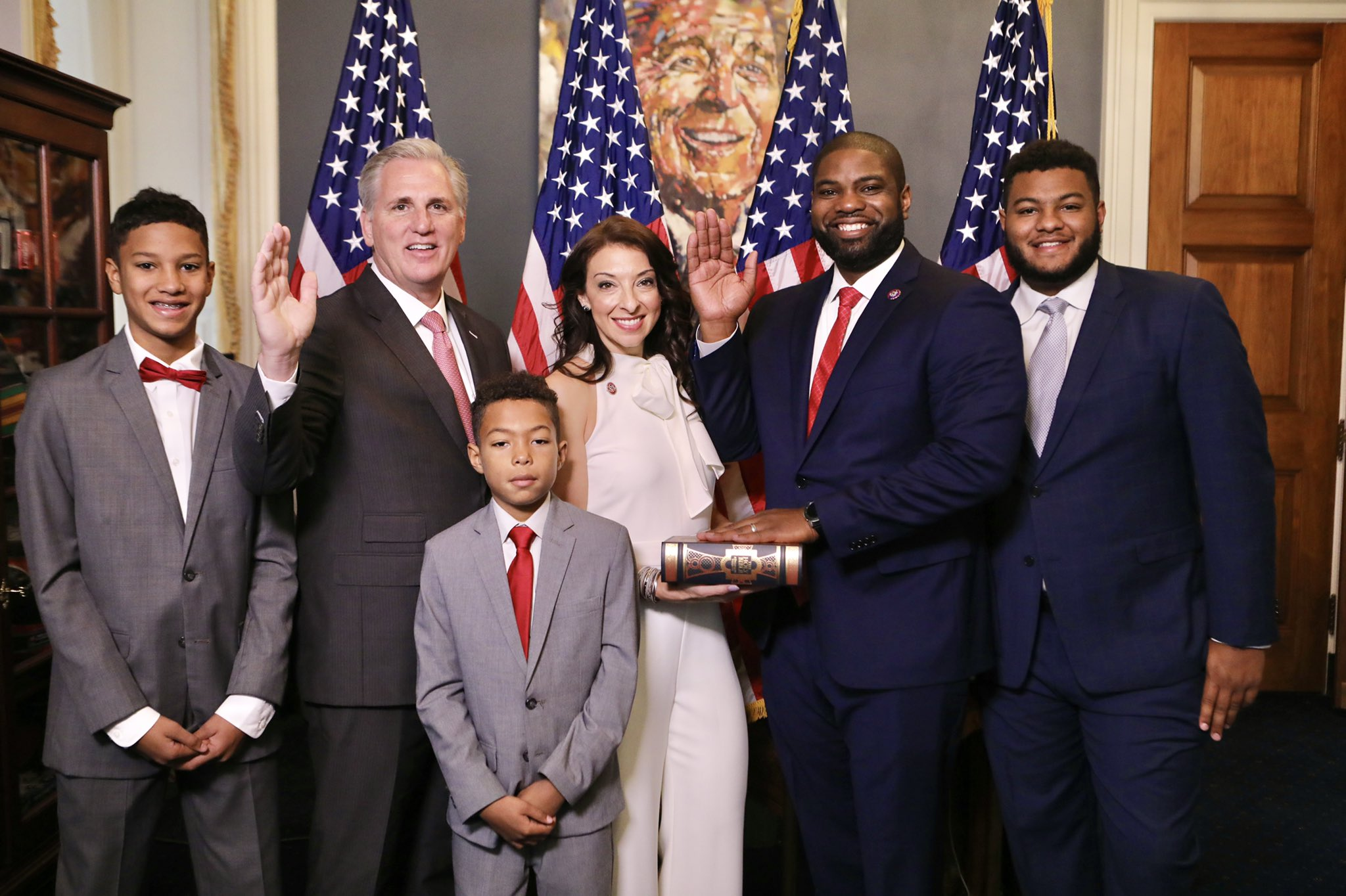
Donalds being ceremonially sworn in by House minority leader Kevin McCarthy

Donalds was the Republican nominee for Florida's 19th congressional district in the 2020 election, running to succeed retiring incumbent Francis Rooney. He won a crowded nine-way Republican primary by 770 votes over state representative Dane Eagle, finishing just over the threshold to avoid a recount. Republicans have a 550,000-voter advantage over Democrats in registration, and Florida Gulf Coast University professor Peter Bergerson noted that the Republican primary is almost always the real contest for most races in the area. In August 2020, anonymous text messages were sent to constituents in the 19th district claiming that Donalds was dropping out of the race. Donalds later clarified via tweet that he was not dropping out and called the messages "illegal".

During his campaign, Donalds called himself a "Trump-supporting, gun-owning, liberty-loving, pro-life, politically incorrect Black man." He stated his support for economic freedom, clean water, nuclear power, and decreased government involvement in healthcare. He opposed the Green New Deal.

In the November general election, Donalds defeated Democratic nominee Cindy Banyai. Donalds said he would focus on policy related to water quality in Southwest Florida. Upon his swearing-in on January 3, 2021, Donalds became the sixth person to represent this district since its creation in 1983 (it had been the 13th District from 1983 to 1993, the 14th from 1993 to 2013, and has been the 19th since 2013).

=== Tenure in Congress ===
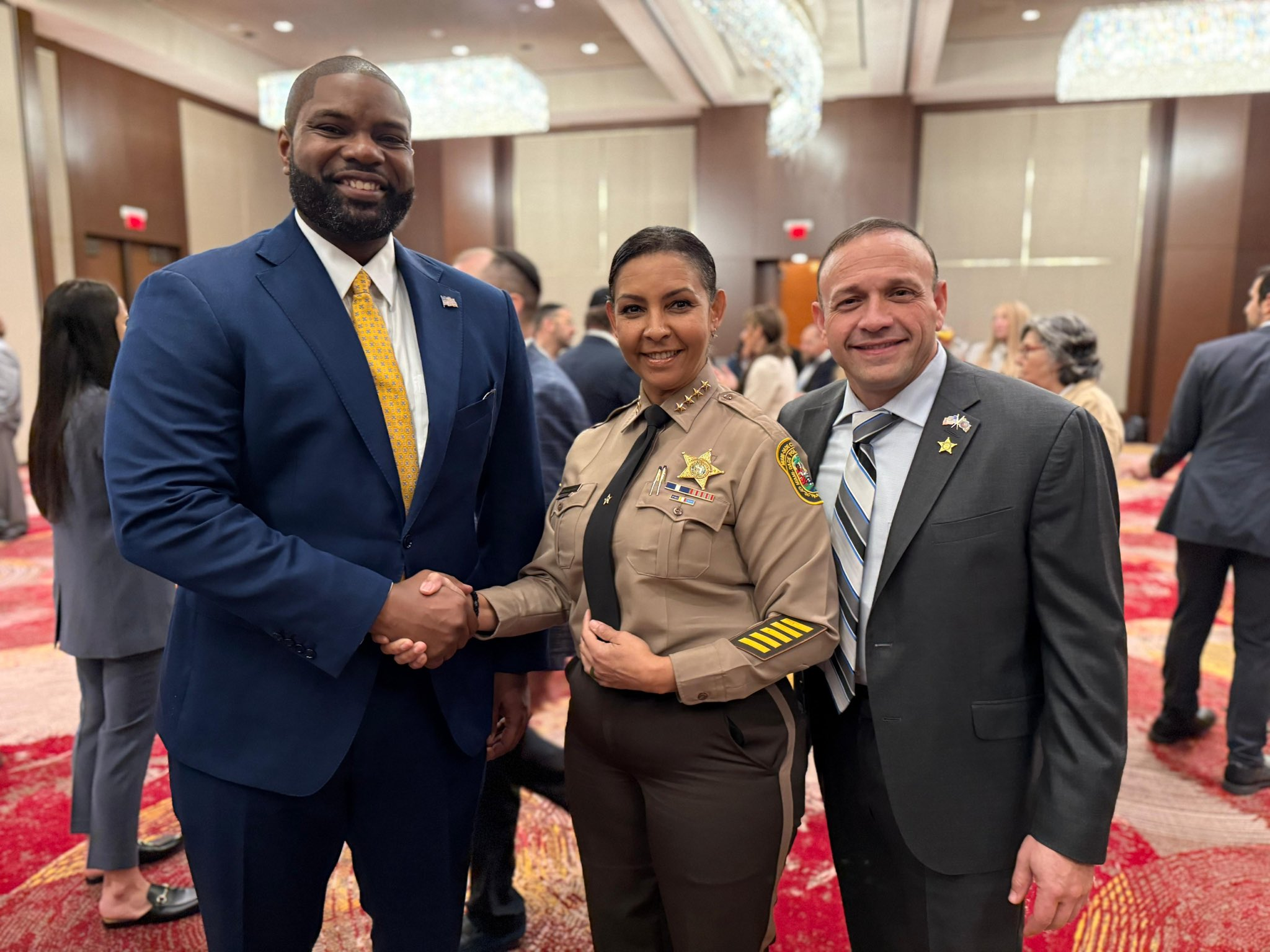
Donalds with Miami-Dade County sheriff Rosie Cordero-Stutz, 2025

In late 2020, Donalds was identified as a participant in the "Freedom Force", a group of incoming House Republicans who "say they’re fighting against socialism in America". In 2021, Donalds was blocked from joining the Congressional Black Caucus.

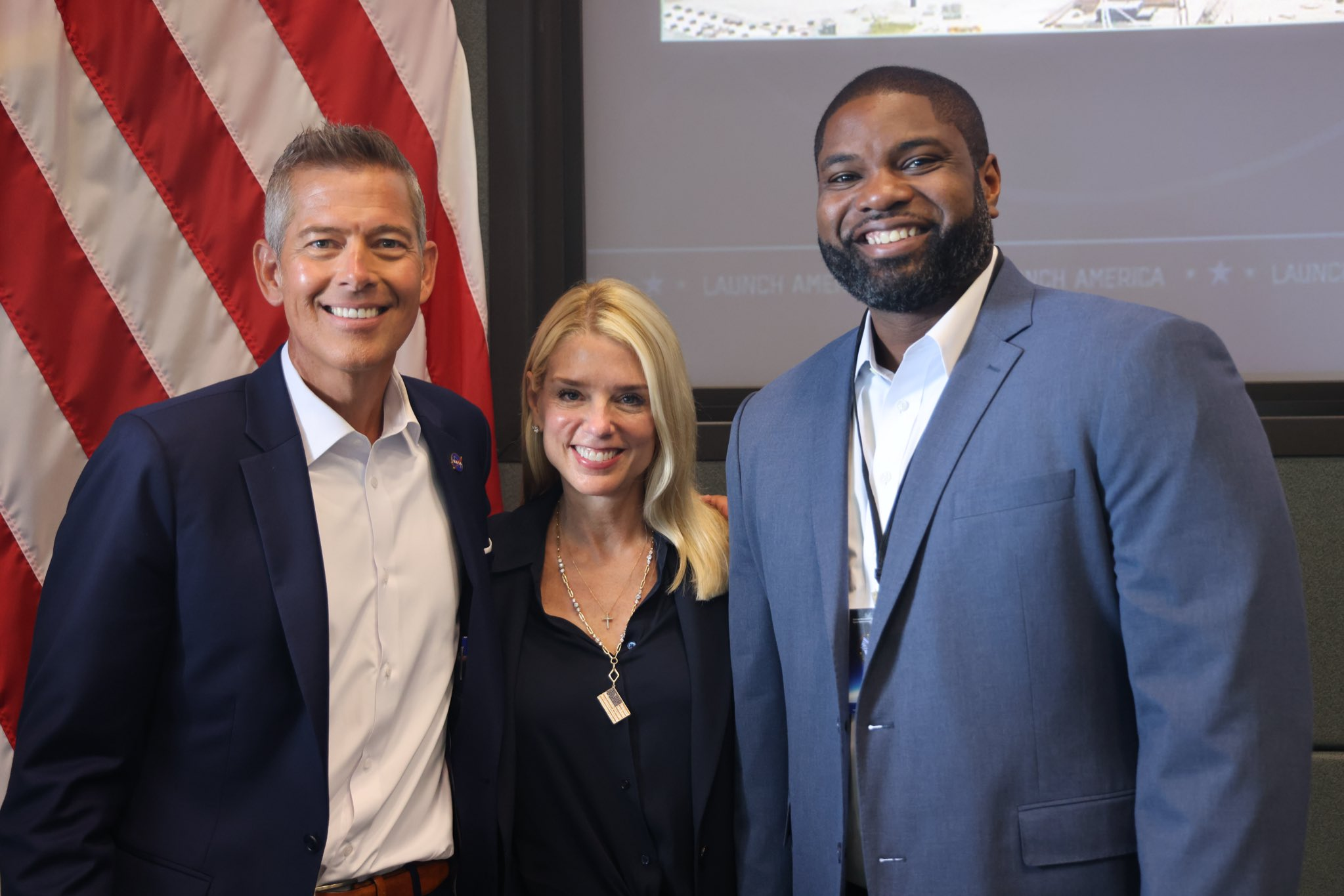
Donalds with Attorney General Pam Bondi and Transportation Secretary Sean Duffy, 2025

==== 2020 election ====
In January 2021, Donalds voted to object to the certification of electors from Arizona and Pennsylvania in the 2020 presidential election. Donalds later said that Joe Biden was not the legitimate president of the United States, a claim he repeated in a 2023 Vanity Fair interview.

==== January 2023 speaker of the House election ====
On January 3, 2023, Donalds received one vote in the 118th Congress's first election for Speaker of the House, from Chip Roy. Donalds voted for Kevin McCarthy on the first two ballots and for Jim Jordan on the third. On January 4, on the fourth ballot, Roy nominated Donalds for speaker, and he received 20 votes. This marked the first time two Black lawmakers were nominated for speaker, the other being Democratic nominee Hakeem Jeffries. He was nominated by Lauren Boebert on the fifth ballot, and again received 20 votes. He was sequentially nominated by Scott Perry, Dan Bishop, Andy Biggs, Matt Rosendale, and Anna Paulina Luna on the sixth to tenth ballots. He was not nominated on the 11th ballot, but still received 12 votes. Donalds switched his vote back to McCarthy after House Republican leadership made concessions to House Freedom Caucus members.

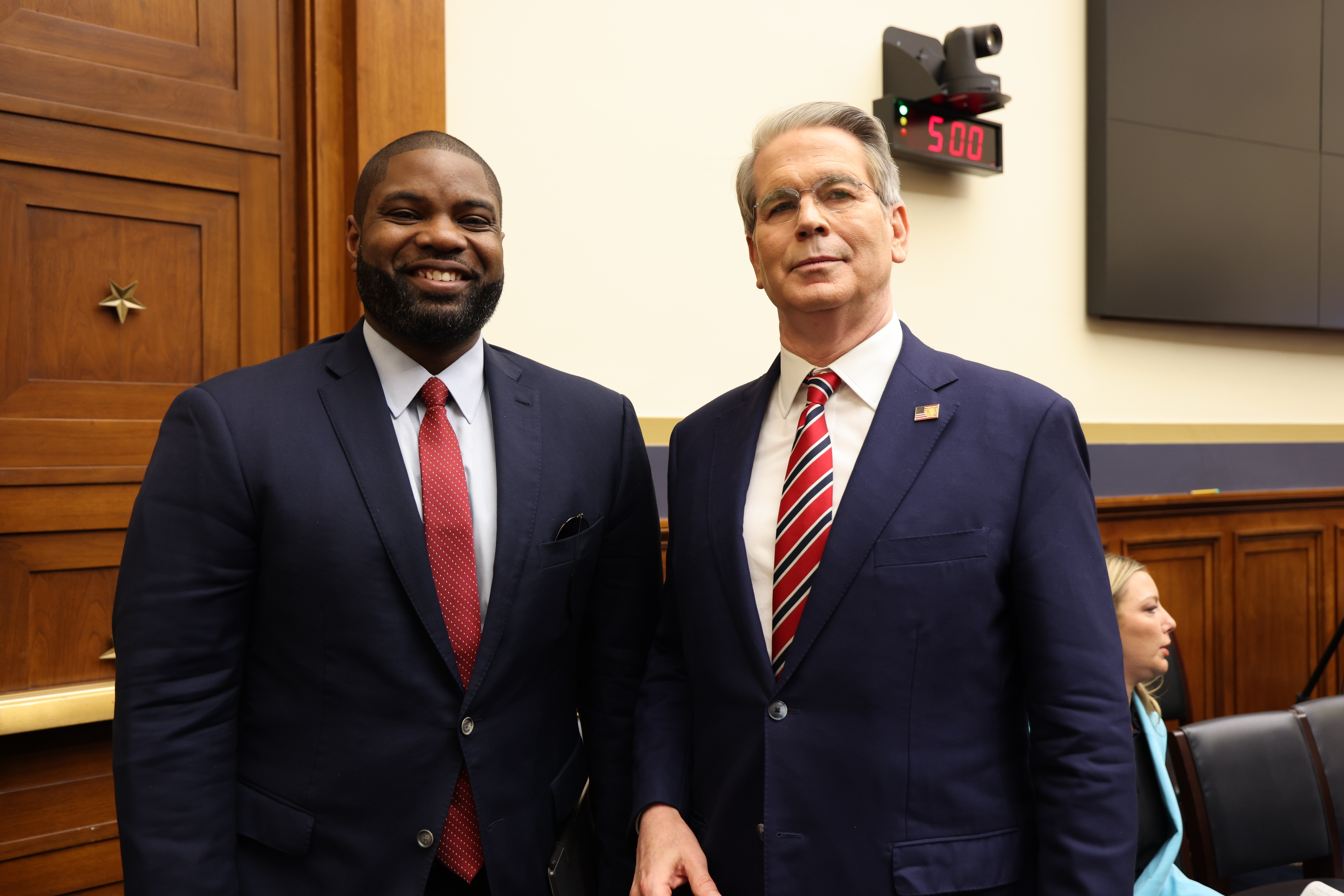
Donalds with Treasury Secretary Scott Bessent

==== Subcommittee hearing on Hurricane Ian ====
On August 10, 2023, Donalds was one of the main questioners during the United States House Subcommittee on Government Operations and the Federal Workforce's televised investigative hearing on the federal government's response to and overall recovery efforts from Hurricane Ian in 2022. Questions from Donalds led Congress to discover various government agencies had "regulatory hurdles, miscommunication, and burdensome administrative requirements", which made recovery efforts difficult, and that FEMA did not "tap into the expertise on the local level and pre-certify people from the city".

==== October 2023 candidacy for speaker ====
Donalds was a candidate for Speaker of the United States House of Representatives in the October 2023 election.

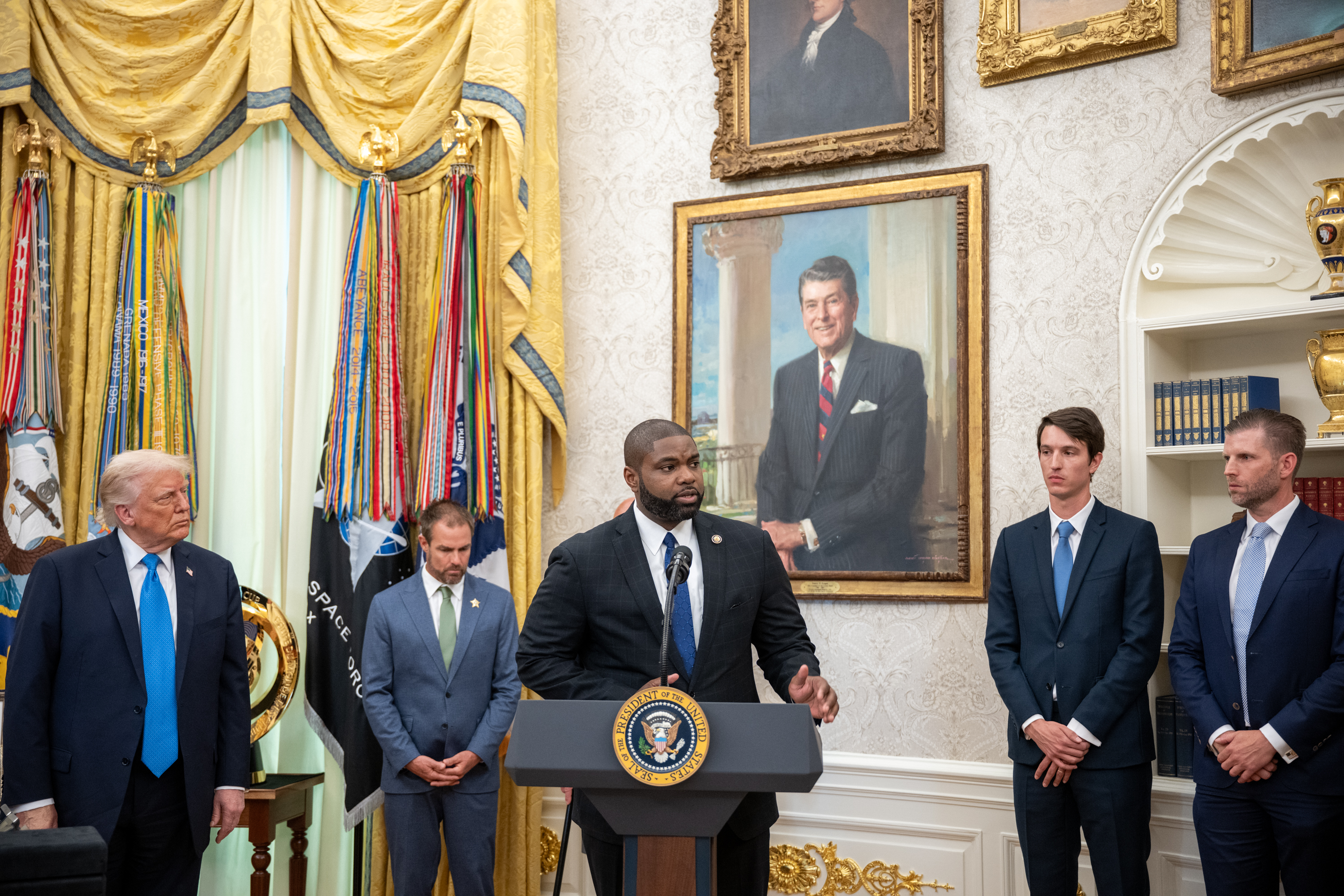
Donalds speaking in the Oval Office during a ceremony rewarding the newly-created "Medal of Sacrifice" to three fallen deputies of the Palm Beach County Sheriff's Office, May 2025

==== Comments on Jim Crow era ====
In a political outreach event in June 2024, Donalds said of the Jim Crow era:

You see, during Jim Crow, the black family was together. During Jim Crow, more black people were not just conservative—black people have always been conservative-minded—but more black people voted conservatively. And then, HEW, Lyndon Johnson, and then you go down that road, and now we are where we are. What's happened in America the last ten years, and I say it because it's my contemporaries…you're starting to see more black people be married in homes raising kids.

After some backlash against those remarks, Donalds denied "that Black people were doing better under Jim Crow" or that "Jim Crow is great", and also denied having been inaccurate when he said that black marriage rates were relatively high during that era.

In February 2024, Donald Trump said that Donalds was among those he was considering as a running mate, and media outlets subsequently listed him as a potential vice-presidential nominee.

==== Voting Record ====
The Heritage Action Scorecard gives Donalds a 97% rating as a conservative, compared to the 87% rating of average House Republicans. While in Congress he consistently cast votes in support of President Donald Trump and his political agenda.

- January 7, 2021 – Voted in objection to certification of the Electoral College vote, hours after the January 6 United States Capitol attack that sought to disrupt the certification proceedings.
- January 13, 2021 – A week after the January 6 United States Capitol attack Donalds voted against the impeachment of Donald Trump for the high crime of Incitement of Insurrection.
- July 3, 2025 – Voted in Support of An Act to Provide for Reconciliation Pursuant to Title II of H. Con. Res. 14 (dubbed by Trump the One Big, Beautiful Bill Act). The comprehensive law contains hundreds of provisions enacting the tax and spending policies central to President Trump's second-term agenda.
- April 16, 2026 – Voted against a bill that would reinstate and extend Temporary Protected Status (TPS) protections for Haitian immigrants. On July 27, 2026, TPS for Haitians nationwide was officially terminated under the direction of President Trump. According to Human Rights Watch, before the termination, 330,000 Haitians were covered by TPS nationally, including 158,000 Haitians in Florida.
- April to July 2026 - Voted repeatedly against a monthly recurring House resolution to require the president to remove armed forces from hostilities with Iran.
- June 9, 2026 – Voted in support of the Secure America Act, a law that implements President Trump's core immigration policies. It appropriated approximately $70 billion in supplemental funding for border security, with increased funding for ICE on top of the original funding in the One Big Beautiful Bill Act.

=== Committee assignments ===
For the 119th Congress, Donalds has been assigned on Committee on Financial Services, which includes Subcommittee on Digital Assets, Financial Technology, and Artificial Intelligence and Subcommittee on Financial Institutions, as well as Committee on Oversight and Government Reform, which includes Subcommittee on Economic Growth, Energy Policy, and Regulatory Affairs and Subcommittee on Military and Foreign Affairs. He is a member of the Congressional Blockchain Caucus, Freedom Caucus, Sharia-Free America Caucus, and the Republican Study Committee.

=== CLC stock trades complaint ===
On September 5, 2024, the Campaign Legal Center (CLC) filed an ethics complaint accusing Donalds of violating the Stop Trading on Congressional Knowledge (STOCK) Act by failing to disclose over 100 stock trades, totaling up to $1.6 million, made between 2022 and 2023.

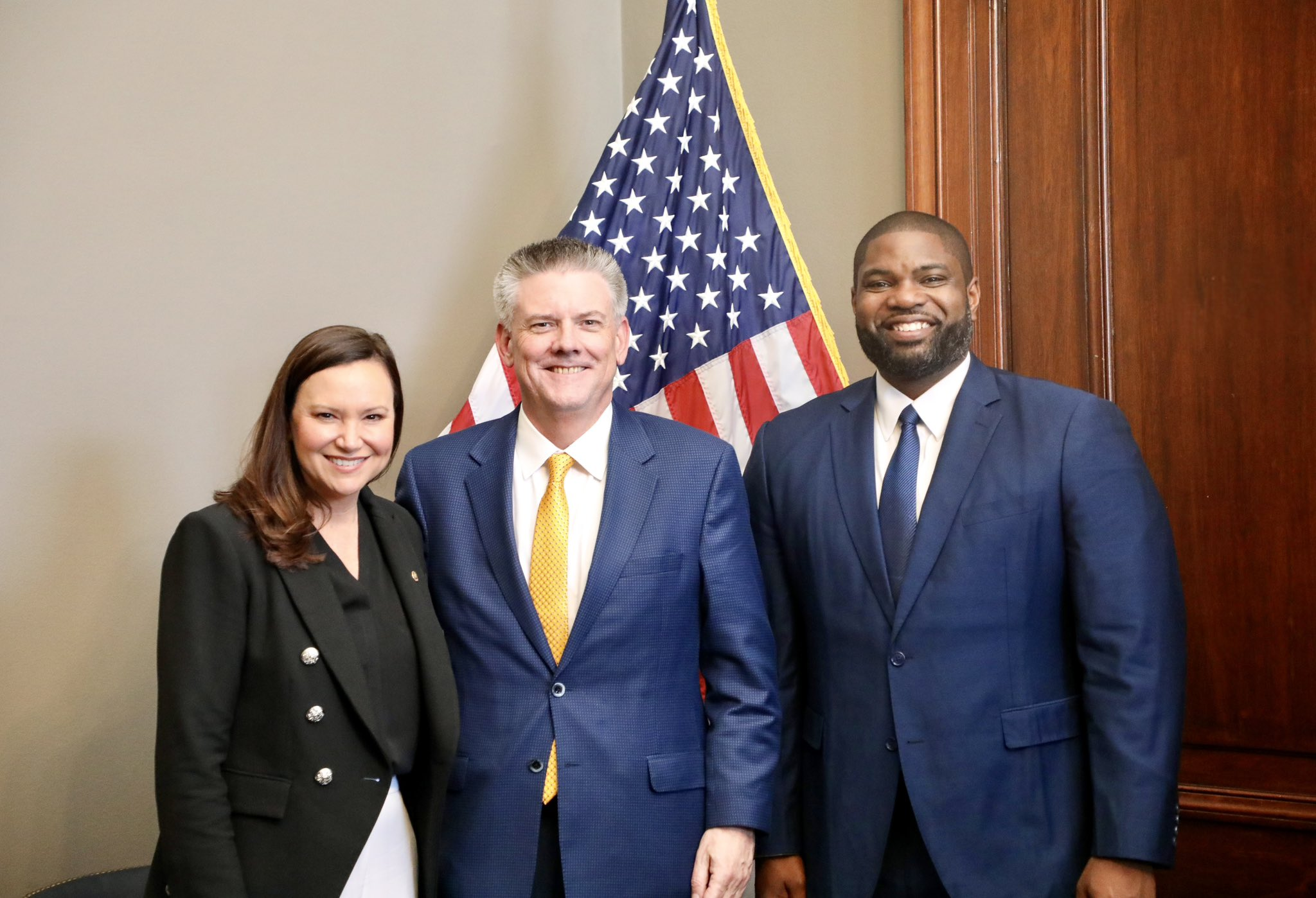
Donalds with Senator Ashley Moody and NASA chief of staff Brian Hughes, 2025

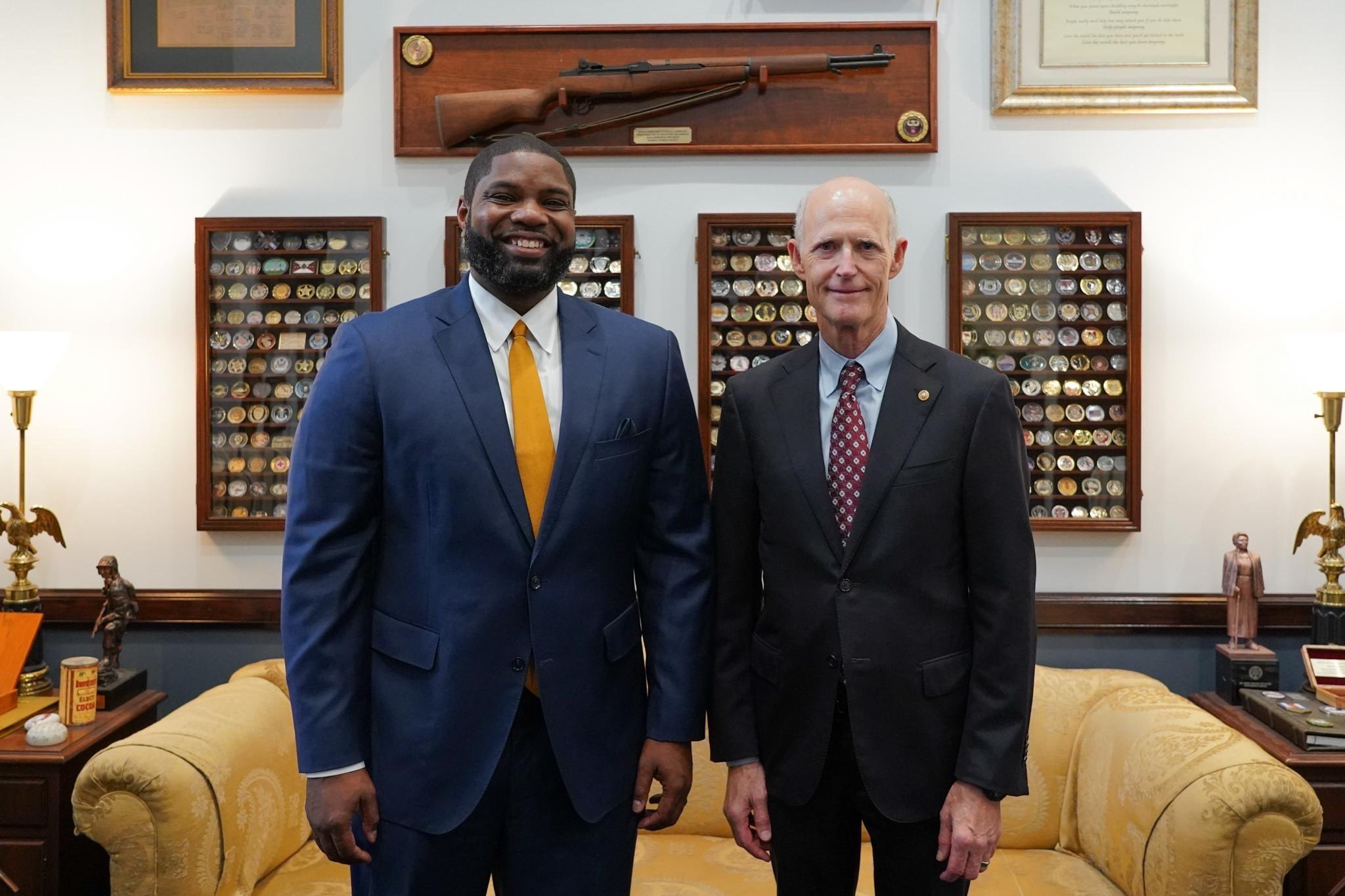
Donalds with Senator Rick Scott, 2025

== 2026 Florida gubernatorial campaign ==
In February 2025, Donalds announced his candidacy for governor of Florida in the 2026 election. Days earlier, Trump had posted on Truth Social that Donalds would have his "Complete and Total Endorsement."

In September 2026, Donalds raised questions in the media when he removed the item "Enact the Trump agenda" from the top issues on his website. He subsequently reaffirmed his support, stating Trump's agenda is a "commonsense agenda"

Donalds won the election on November 3, 2026 with just over 50% of the vote, making him the first Black person elected to a statewide office in Florida, and the first Black Republican elected as a governor in the United States.

== Political positions ==
=== Agriculture ===
In March 2024, Donalds was one of ten House Republicans who signed a letter to the House Agriculture Committee opposing the inclusion of the Ending Agricultural Trade Suppression (EATS) Act or similar language in the 2024 farm bill. The EATS Act would have preempted state and local laws regulating agricultural products sold across state lines, including animal welfare laws like California's Proposition 12.

=== Economic policy ===
Donalds supports expanding development of data centers in Florida.

=== Education ===
Donalds supports charter schools and school voucher programs. According to Mother Jones, in 2017, Donalds sponsored legislation that allocated millions of dollars of Florida state funding towards management fees for charter school companies. Donalds's wife, Erika, operates OptimaEd, a business operating multiple charter schools in Florida. During his tenure in the Florida legislature, Donalds co-sponsored a bill that allowed charter schools to collect additional funding via tax initiatives. He also established a state school voucher program.

Byron and Erika Donalds were founding members of Florida Citizens Alliance, an organization that has sought to remove books from schools that they believe indoctrinate students. The Donaldses are also affiliated with Moms for Liberty, which has also advocated for book removals. In 2017, Donalds introduced legislation making it easier for Florida residents to challenge school library books and textbooks they consider inappropriate.

=== Environment ===
Donalds does not believe that climate change is caused by humans, saying that "the science is not settled on that". Donalds blamed European insurance companies for inflating insurance costs for homeowners in Florida by factoring climate change into their risk analysis. He suggested that climate change risk should not matter in assessing insurance costs.

=== Foreign policy ===
In 2023, The Hill characterized Donalds as "part of a Republican minority wing that has consistently opposed Ukraine funding." Donalds opposed U.S. funding to defend Ukraine in the Russo-Ukrainian war, citing the U.S. federal deficit as justification. "To be blunt, we're running a $2 trillion deficit. Any money we give to Ukraine, we're borrowing from our future." Donalds said. Donalds supports U.S. funding for Israel in the Gaza War, stating "We should stand behind Israel 100%." Donalds supported the Trump administration starting the 2026 Iran War. He predicted a "succinct" resolution to the conflict, saying: "We don't do six-year engagements. We go over with our men and women, the best military in the world. We blow up all your stuff. And then we go home." In July 2026, Donalds defended the Trump administration's conduct in Iran, saying the US could not let Iran obtain a nuclear weapon and that Trump would be "derelict in his duty" if he acted otherwise. In an interview with Meet the Press in April 2026, Donalds said he supports "full-scale regime change" in Cuba.

=== Immigration ===
In 2023, Donalds introduced the Reform Immigration Through Biometrics Act, which would require the collection of fingerprints, facial images, and iris scan for all travelers to the US. The legislation did not advance past committee. Donalds reintroduced the legislation in 2026 as H.R. 8371.

On May 5, 2025, Donalds appeared on Meet the Press with Kristen Welker and said, "When it comes to due process, that is a privilege reserved for American citizens."

Donalds opposes the "current interpretation" of birthright citizenship in the United States. He has said that birthright citizenship "has been abused beyond recognition." When the Supreme Court of the United States invalidated President Trump's executive order limiting birthright citizenship in Trump v. Barbara, Donalds called the ruling "a terrible decision."

In July 2026, Donalds visited the Venezuelan restaurant El Arepazo, in Doral, Miami-Dade County. A journalist asked Donalds whether he would support legislation that offered a pathway to permanent residency for Venezuelan immigrants previously eligible for Temporary Protected Status. Donalds said that any immigrant whose Temporary Protected Status ended would be deported without a chance at another immigration status.

=== Islam ===
In January 2026, Donalds was named a founding member of the Sharia-Free America Caucus, which seeks to ban Sharia law. He said, "Sharia has no place in America. We will not surrender our freedoms." The Council on American–Islamic Relations (CAIR), a civil rights organization, named Donalds and other House members in a statement designating the Sharia Free America Caucus an anti-Muslim hate group and saying the caucus's agenda "would effectively ban the practice of the world's second largest religion in the United States."

=== LGBTQ rights ===
In 2020, Donalds and six other Republicans in the Florida legislature introduced several anti-LGBTQ bills that would repeal local ordinances that protect LGBTQ employees, legalize conversion therapy, and imprison doctors who provide transition-related medical care to minors.

In 2021, Donalds spoke at an event hosted by the Truth and Liberty Coalition, which has described homosexuality as "Satan's work". The organization was honoring Donalds's support for charter schools. At a Conservative Political Action Conference event, Donalds described heterosexual relationships as "the natural order that keeps society progressing."

=== Veterans ===
Donalds voted against the Honoring our PACT Act of 2022, which expanded VA benefits to veterans exposed to toxic chemicals during their military service.

== Electoral history ==
=== 2012 ===
2012 Florida's 19th congressional district Republican primary results
Party	Candidate	Votes	%
Republican	Trey Radel	22,304	30.0
Republican	Chauncey Porter Goss	16,005	21.5
Republican	Paige Kreegel	13,167	17.7
Republican	Gary Aubuchon	11,498	15.5
Republican	Byron Donalds	10,389	14.0
Republican	Joe Davidow	1,028	1.4
Total votes		74,391	100.0

=== 2016 ===
2016 Florida's 80th House district Republican primary
Party	Candidate	Votes	%
Republican	Byron Donalds	9,115	64.4%
Republican	Joe Davidow	5,041	35.6%
Total votes		14,156	100.0

2016 Florida's 80th House district general election
Party	Candidate	Votes	%
Republican	Byron Donalds	51,031	100.0%
Independent	Anthony Joseph Cetrangelo (write-in)	7	0.0%
Total votes		51,038	100.0

=== 2018 ===
2018 Florida's 80th House district general election
Party	Candidate	Votes	%
Republican	Byron Donalds (incumbent)	37,881	62.1%
Democratic	Jennifer Boddicker	22,207	36.4%
Independent	Dustin Alexander Lapolla	931	1.5%
Total votes		61,019	100.0

=== 2020 ===
2020 Florida's 19th congressional district Republican primary results
Party	Candidate	Votes	%
Republican	Byron Donalds	23,492	22.6%
Republican	Dane Eagle	22,715	21.9%
Republican	Casey Askar	20,774	20.0%
Republican	William Figlesthaler	19,075	18.3%
Republican	Randy Henderson	7,858	7.6%
Republican	Christy McLaughlin	4,245	4.1%
Republican	Dan Severson	3,197	3.1%
Republican	Darren Aquino	1,466	1.4%
Republican	Daniel Kowal	1,135	1.1%
Total votes		103,957	100.0%

2020 Florida's 19th congressional district general election
Party	Candidate	Votes	%
Republican	Byron Donalds	272,440	61.27%
Democratic	Cindy Banyai	172,146	38.72%
Independent	Patrick Post (write-in)	3	0.01%
Total votes		444,589	100.0

=== 2022 ===
2022 Florida's 19th congressional district Republican primary results
Party	Candidate	Votes	%
Republican	Byron Donalds (incumbent)	76,192	83.7
Republican	Jim Huff	14,795	16.3
Total votes		90,987	100.0

2022 Florida's 19th congressional district general election
Party	Candidate	Votes	%
Republican	Byron Donalds (incumbent)	213,035	68.01%
Democratic	Cindy Banyai	100,226	31.99%
Independent	Patrick Post (write-in)	13	0%
Total votes		313,274	100.0%

=== 2024 ===
Florida's 19th congressional district, 2024
Party	Candidate	Votes	%
Republican	Byron Donalds (incumbent)	275,708	66.32
Democratic	Kari Lerner	140,038	33.68
Total votes		415,746	100.00
Republican hold			

=== 2026 ===
2026 Florida gubernatorial election Republican primary results
Party	Candidate	Votes	%
Republican	Byron Donalds	810,552	47.8
Republican	Jay Collins	426,696	25.2
Republican	James Fishback	177,660	10.5
Republican	Paul Renner	144,950	8.5
Republican	Bobby Williams	69,026	4.1
Republican	Rachel Rodriguez	27,602	1.6
Republican	Jim Holcomb	13,172	0.8
Republican	James Walker Shaw	7,878	0.5
Republican	Arthur Joseph McCaffrey	7,039	0.4
Republican	Caneste Succe	6,266	0.4
Republican	Daniel Nokovich	5,188	0.3
Total votes		1,696,029	100.0

== Personal life ==
Byron Donalds married Bisa Hall on June 15, 1999. The purpose of the marriage was to allow Hall, his ex-girlfriend at the time, to qualify for in-state tuition based on Byron's Florida residency. According to Hall, the marriage was not a romantic relationship and she and Donalds did not live together as a married couple. They divorced in 2002.

Donalds met and started dating his future wife, Erika Lees, in 1999 at Florida State University. They married on March 15, 2003. They have three sons and live in Naples, Florida. Donalds is a born again Christian. He says he became born again after communicating with God at age 21 while working at Cracker Barrel.

=== Assault allegation ===
In August 2022, Donalds and Kelly Mason (also known as Kelly Lichter), a member of the Collier County School Board, were recorded in a heated exchange, while inside of a Naples grocery store. Footage of the incident was published online by NBC-2; while much of the video is inaudible, Donalds can be heard yelling at Mason, "You want to end it? Stop the lawsuits, Kelly. Stop that. How about that?" At the time, Mason told media outlets that Donalds was "threatening me, saying he is going to crush me".

In July 2026, Mason filed a second civil lawsuit against Donalds. In a statement, Mason said that in 2022, Donalds "assaulted me. He must answer for his crimes". Mason also said she had been intimidated by Donalds and his wife Erika, a former business partner of Mason, into dropping a previous lawsuit. Donalds denied the allegations and called the second lawsuit a "politically motivated attack".

== See also ==
- List of African-American United States representatives
- List of African-American Republicans
- List of Hispanic and Latino Americans in the United States Congress

== Notes ==
U.S. House of Representatives
Preceded by Francis Rooney	Member of the U.S. House of Representatives from Florida's 19th congressional district 2021–present	Incumbent
Party political offices
Preceded by Ron DeSantis	Republican nominee for Governor of Florida; 2026	Most recent
Political offices
Preceded by Ron DeSantis	Governor of Florida; Taking office 2027	Elect
U.S. order of precedence (ceremonial)
Preceded by Andrew Clyde	United States representatives by seniority 246th	Succeeded by Pat Fallon
