= Concealed Carry Reciprocity Act =

US federal bill

Constitutional Concealed Carry Reciprocity Act
- Long title: A bill to amend title 18, United States Code, to provide a means by which nonresidents of a State whose residents may carry concealed firearms may also do so in the State.
- Announced in: the 119th United States Congress

Legislative history
- Introduced in the House as H.R. 38 by Richard Hudson (R‑NC 9th) on January 3, 2025; Committee consideration by House Judiciary

The Concealed Carry Reciprocity Act, later the Constitutional Concealed Carry Reciprocity Act (H.R. 38), is a bill that would amend Title 18 of the United States Code to require all U.S. states to recognize concealed carry permits granted by other states. It would also allow the concealed transport of handguns across state lines, so long as it is allowed by both states and would amend the Gun-Free School Zones Act of 1990 to allow permit holders to carry a concealed weapon in school zones in any state.

== Legislative history ==
This information is current as of October 3, 2025.

| Congress | Short title | Bill number(s) | Date introduced | Sponsor(s) | # of cosponsors | Latest status |
|---|---|---|---|---|---|---|
| 114th Congress | Concealed Carry Reciprocity Act of 2015 | H.R. 986 | February 13, 2015 | Richard Hudson (R-NC) | 216 | Died in committee |
| 115th Congress | Concealed Carry Reciprocity Act of 2017 | H.R. 38 | January 3, 2017 | Richard Hudson (R-NC) | 213 | Passed in the House (231–198) |
| 116th Congress | Concealed Carry Reciprocity Act of 2019 | H.R. 38 | January 3, 2019 | Richard Hudson (R-NC) | 167 | Died in committee |
| 117th Congress | Concealed Carry Reciprocity Act | H.R. 38 | January 4, 2021 | Richard Hudson (R-NC) | 203 | Referred to the Subcommittee on Crime, Terrorism, and Homeland Security. |
| 118th Congress | Concealed Carry Reciprocity Act | H.R. 38 | January 9, 2023 | Richard Hudson (R-NC) | 171 | Referred to the House Committee on the Judiciary. |
| 119th Congress | Constitutional Concealed Carry Reciprocity Act | H.R. 38 | January 3, 2025 | Richard Hudson (R-NC) | 189 | Referred to the House Committee on the Judiciary. |

The version of the bill was introduced in the 115th United States Congress by Richard Hudson, a North Carolina Republican in the United States House of Representatives, on January 3, 2017. Hudson is the bill's chief sponsor, but the bill has over 200 co-sponsors as well. On November 29, the House Judiciary Committee voted 19–11 to advance the bill to the floor of the House for a vote. Congressional Democrats had proposed multiple amendments to the bill, all of which were voted down by Republicans. The bill is intended to be combined with another, bipartisan bill aimed at improving the National Instant Criminal Background Check System. On December 6, the House passed the bill 231–198.

== Responses ==
The National Rifle Association praised the bill, writing on its website that "This would end abuses in anti-gun states like California, New York and New Jersey and allow law-abiding concealed carriers to exercise their rights nationwide with peace of mind".

Democrats have criticized the bill, claiming, among other things, that it would infringe on states' rights and adversely affect public safety. Gun control advocates such as Sara Gorman have also criticized the bill, stating that it would be dangerous for victims of domestic abuse because it would allow people to circumvent background checks for guns or permits by obtaining them in more permissive states.

On February 11, 2018, it was reported that President Donald Trump "fully" supported the bill, but on February 27 it was reported that Trump instead preferred Fix NICS Act, sponsored by Senator John Cornyn (R-TX), that included stronger background checks. Trump signed "Fix NICS" on March 23, 2018.

== See also ==
- Fix NICS Act of 2017
