= Florida Opportunity Scholarship Program =

School voucher program in Florida, USA

The Florida Opportunity Scholarship Program was a school voucher program in the U.S. state of Florida. It provided students from failing public schools in Florida with school vouchers enabling them to choose a "higher performing public school or a participating private school." A failing public school was: "a school that has received two "F" grades within a four-year period."

The program was declared unconstitutional in a January 5, 2006, ruling and students assigned to a failing school are no longer allowed to transfer and enroll in a participating private school while "the option to attend a higher performing public school remains in effect."

There is also a university scholarship program in Florida known as the Florida Opportunity Scholars Program (FOS) program

== See also ==
- School voucher
- School choice in Florida
