= Paige Kreegel =

American politician

Paige V. Kreegel
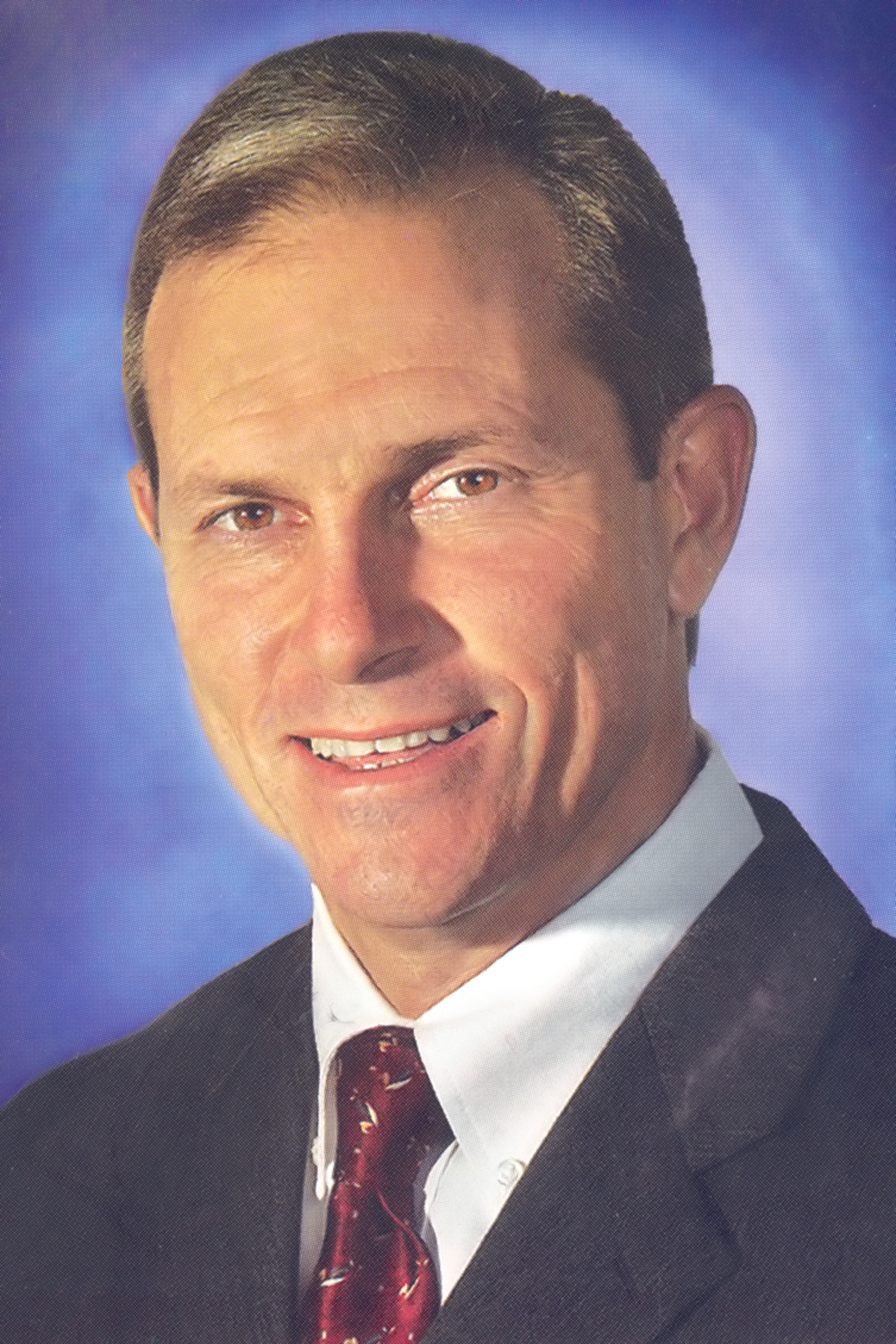

Member of the Florida House of Representatives from the 72nd district
- In office November 2, 2004 – November 7, 2012
- Preceded by: Lindsay Harrington
- Succeeded by: Ray Pilon

Personal details
- Born: Paige Vanier Kreegel
- Party: Republican
- Spouse: Erika McCarthy
- Children: Three; Olivia, Savannah, Christian
- Education: American University; University of Miami; New York Medical College
- Occupation: Politician; Medical doctor

Paige V. Kreegel (born August 20, 1958, in Miami, Florida) is a physician and was previously a Republican representative in the Florida House of Representatives, where he represented District 72 - which covers all of De Soto County and parts of Charlotte County and Lee County. Kreegel was first elected to the Florida House in 2004, and was unopposed for re-election in 2006. He is a physician and resides in Punta Gorda, Florida. He was a Republican candidate in a special election in April 2014 to fill Florida's 19th district U.S. House of Representatives seat vacated by Trey Radel.

== Early life and education ==
Kreegel graduated from New York Medical College in Valhalla, New York in 1982 with a medical degree. He attended University of Miami and American University as an undergraduate. He has a master's degree in Business Administration from IMPAC University in Punta Gorda, Florida.

== Career ==
Kreegel was associate professor at the University of South Florida in Tampa in 1990. He is founder of American-Medic, a multi-functional clinic in Charlotte County, Florida.

=== Physician ===
Kreegel has served as the physician for Charlotte County Sheriff's Office SWAT Team.

=== Politics ===
Kreegel was a Representative in the Florida State House of Representatives from 2005 to 2012. He was chairman of the Health Care Services Policy Committee.

In January 2012, Kreegel ran for the Republican nomination for the U.S. Congressional District 14 (now renumbered as District 19) of Florida. Kreegel lost to Trey Radel in the Republican congressional primary and was third behind Chauncey Goss, the son of (former FL Congressman and CIA Director) Porter Goss, closely followed by Byron Donalds. The race was for the District 19 seat was held on August 14, 2012.

== Professional affiliations ==
- American Medical Association
- Charlotte County Cattlemen's Association
- Florida Medical Association
- Gulf Coast Citrus Growers Association
- Peace River Valley Citrus Growers Association
