= School choice in Florida =

Educational program

School choice in the U.S. state of Florida is a suite of state programs that allow families to use public resources to receive education outside of their neighborhood public school. Florida's Tax Credit Scholarship (FTC) program (Florida Statute 1002.395) is the largest of its kind in the U.S., with more students than all but the state's largest school districts.

In March 2023, Florida's school choice program expanded by removing the income-eligibility requirements that were part of the previous programs. This made all students eligible for taxpayer-backed scholarships through educational savings accounts (ESA's) as of the 2023-2024 school year.

Florida's public school options include magnet schools, academies, charter schools and other programs. Private schools provide additional options.

District Public Schools in Florida are also able to participate in the scholarship programs and provide classes, courses, testing and services to all scholarship recipients as a valid and eligible expense within the program. This can result in additional funding being brought into the public education system by means homeschooling families that participate in these scholarship programs.

All of the Educational Savings Account Scholarships are funded by the Scholarship Funding Organizations in statute, and in Florida there are currently two such organizations, Step Up For Students and AAA Scholarship Foundation. This includes the vouchers, often confused with scholarships, that are available for Private School Students that the student can use to pay the tuition to a participating private school in the State of Florida.

From the school year 2019-20 through the school year 2022-2023, enrollment in Florida's private schools grew to 445,000 students, an increase of 47,000. During the same period, the number of homeschooled children in the state rose to 154,000, an increase of 50,000 Enrollment in the state's charter schools rose by 68,000 students in the same three-year span of time.

== Choice programs ==
- Home schooling is not a term that is used in Florida Statutes, but is used colloquially to identify students who are enrolled in Home Education (Florida Statute 1002.41) gives parents the right to direct the education of their student as they see fit, and allows them to set the standards for curriculum, values, and methods of learning. This right was fought for by Brenda Dickinson and Craig Dickinson during the 1980's and was finally recognized in statute in 1985 specifically establishing this right. Before this, "homeschooling" was only able to be a legal path for satisfying attendance through enrolling in a private school, called Umbrella Schools, which would allow you to "homeschool." Parents in Florida are given the direct right to educate their own children as they see fit. Later, the Florida Legislature recognized the work of Craig Dickinson after he died from cancer by naming the section of statutes after him that gave home education students the right to participate in extracurricular activities at public and private schools in Florida (Florida Statute 1006.15). It's called the "Craig Dickinson Act."
- McKay scholarships help students with disabilities. Students can attend a private school or another public school.
- Gardiner scholarships help students attend a private school who have specific disabilities and an Individualized Education Plan (IEP). The award can also be used to purchase curriculum, materials and other services, and to offset home schooling costs.
- Hope tax credit scholarships help students who report bullying or harassment. Such students can opt for private school, or access free transport to a public school. Funds come from vehicle sales taxes that are designated by payers to support the program.
- Opportunity scholarships serve students who attend public schools graded "D" or "F". Students can enroll in another public school with a higher grade and receive free transport. Districts identify schools that are eligible to receive such students, limited by capacity and transport. Fewer than 10% of students generally participate.
- Virtual schooling provides distance learning and is offered by public school districts, Florida Virtual School and some charter schools.
- Charter schools are public schools that operate independently of school districts.
- Open enrollment allows students to enroll in any school within their district. In some cases students can enroll across district boundaries, although in-district students have priority. Open enrollment is available to all students.
- Family Empowerment scholarships make FTC available to more students. They are funded through the Florida Education Finance Program. Eligible students attend public school, live in families with incomes up to 300% of the poverty line, those eligible for the food assistance program, Temporary Assistance to Needy Families or Food Distribution on Indian Reservations and those in foster care or in out-of-home care.

== History ==
Modern school choice programs in Florida began in 1999 under Governor Jeb Bush as part of the "A+ Plan" for education. The Opportunity Scholarship Program allowed students assigned to public schools that received two "F" grades within a four-year period to transfer to a higher-performing public school or receive a voucher to attend a participating private school. It was the first statewide private-school voucher program in the United States in nearly fifty years. Legal challenges were filed almost immediately after the law was signed.

In 2000, the state created the John M. McKay Scholarships for Students with Disabilities, which allowed eligible students with disabilities to attend another public school or a participating private school. In 2001 the Corporate Tax Credit Scholarship Program (later known as the Florida Tax Credit Scholarship or FTC) was established, providing scholarships funded by corporate tax-credit donations for low-income students to attend private schools.

During the 2017–18 academic year 31,044 students enrolled in 1,482 schools.

In 2006 the Florida Supreme Court ruled the Opportunity Scholarship Program violated the Florida Constitution because the private schools it supported were not part of the "uniform, efficient, safe, secure, and high quality system of free public schools" that the Constitution required. Thereafter private schools were dropped from the program. Enrollment declined from a peak of 4,424 (2011) to 3,074 (2017). African-American and Hispanic students made up the vast majority of enrollees.

The Gardiner scholarship program began in 2016 and had grown to serve 10,000 by the end of 2018.

The Hope scholarship program began in October, 2018. In 2017–18, nearly two thirds of the recipients were on the autism spectrum and used the money to attend a private school. In 2019, 271 students participated.

Home schooling had 89,817 enrollees in 2017–18, increasing about 2,400 from the prior year. The option is most popular in Duval, Hillsborough and Orange counties.

In 2016 the state made it easier for students to attend schools across district boundaries.

In 2017–18, private school support reached $641 million, aiding 108,098 children in 1,818 schools. In 2019 it reached nearly 4% of the K-12 population of nearly 2.78 million students.

The number of charter schools in Florida reached over 658 in 2018–19, serving 313,000 students.

Family Empowerment scholarships were created in 2019. The program was capped at 18,000 students. It eliminated a waiting list of 13,000 families seeking a FTC. Vouchers run between $6,775 and $7,250. 87% of recipients have household incomes below 185% of the federal poverty level. The limit is 300%. Most are Black or Hispanic. In 2020 the cap was increased to 28,000. If demand is insufficient, the income limit will be increased by 25%. Teachers unions opposed the program. In 2023, the Florida State Legislature removed the income limits so that the voucher programs are available to any students regardless of family income.

== School choice ==
As of 2023, 32 states, Washington, DC and Puerto Rico operated voucher or scholarship programs. Many of these programs targeted specific populations such as disabled or low-income students.

There are differing opinions on the impact choice programs have on public schools that lose students. Among the hypotheses that have been advanced are that those schools are forced to improve to compete for students, that the loss of resources from lower enrollment hurts them or that choice-induced changes to their student bodies disadvantages those who remained. Another question surrounds the time path of the impacts, whether they come suddenly or grow as the school choice program evolves.

In the US various studies showed small but positive short-term effects of the introduction of private school voucher programs on public school students’ test scores. Longer-term studies of Milwaukee and North Carolina students showed modestly positive effects. In NC, competition increased over two years, totaling roughly 25%.

A study of scale up of Massachusetts charter programs reported small positive effects on test scores.

== Results ==
A 2023 study published in the American Economic Journal: Economic Policy examined the effects of the Florida Tax Credit Scholarship Program on students remaining in public schools as the program scaled up over roughly 15 years. Using student-level school records matched to birth records and a student fixed-effects design, the authors found that public-school students in areas with greater pre-program private-school options experienced growing benefits, including higher standardized test scores in reading and mathematics and lower rates of absences and suspensions. The gains were largest for lower socioeconomic status students (those with lower income families and with lower maternal education levels), though statistically significant yet smaller positive effects were also observed for higher-SES students. The results were robust to changes in student composition and school resources: both local and district-wide private school competition independently contributed to the outcomes.

A 2019 Urban Institute study examined the effects of the Florida Tax Credit Scholarship Program on postsecondary outcomes. It reported that 57% of FTC participants enrolled in college, compared with just 51% of similar non-participants. FTC students were more likely to enroll full-time and showed higher enrollment rates across both two-year and four-year institutions. They were also somewhat more likely to earn bachelor's degrees, with little difference observed in associate's degree attainment. The program's estimated impact on both college enrollment and degree completion increased with the number of years of FTC participation.

== See also ==
- School choice
- Education in Florida
