= Step Up For Students =

Non-profit organization in the USA

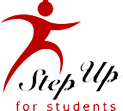
- Formation: 2002
- Founders: John Kirtley
- Type: Non-profit 501(c)3 organization
- Headquarters: Jacksonville, Florida
- President: Doug Tuthill
- Revenue: $618 million in FY2019
- Website: www.stepupforstudents.org
- Formerly called: Children's Scholarship Fund of Tampa Bay, Florida P.R.I.D.E and Children First

Step Up for Students is a 501(c)3 nonprofit in Florida providing low income students, bullied students and students with special needs with scholarships to help pay tuition for private school, assistance to attend an out of district public school, or for tutoring, textbooks or therapies. Step Up For Students was created as part of a merger between Florida's two largest scholarship organizations Florida P.R.I.D.E and Children First, which was founded by Tampa Bay businessman John Kirtley. Kirtley had founded a previous scholarship organization, Children's Scholarship Fund of Tampa Bay in 1998 and received more than 15,000 applications for 750 available scholarships. The large demand led Kirtley to help push for the creation of the Florida Tax Credit Scholarship, which was signed into law in 2001. That scholarship program allows donors to receive dollar for dollar tax credits for contributions to nonprofits offering scholarships to low-income students in Florida. The scholarship was capped at $50 million for the 2002-03 school year and scholarships were awarded to 15,585 students.

Step Up raised $618 million in 2019, making it the 21st largest nonprofit corporation in the U.S. according to Forbes. Step Up awarded scholarships to more than 150,000 students in 2020-21 through five scholarship programs and has awarded more than one million scholarships in total.

== Scholarship programs ==
Step Up For Students is one of two nonprofits administering school choice scholarship programs in Florida. Step Up manages five scholarship programs, awarding approximately 99 percent of the scholarships in the state. As a "Scholarship Funding Organization" in Florida, Step Up must undergo audits and must be approved by the State Board of Education annually.

=== Florida Tax Credit Scholarship ===
The Florida Tax Credit Scholarship (FTC) program was initiated by former Florida governor Jeb Bush in 2001 and began offering scholarships in 2002. The program is intended to offer low-income students scholarships to attend private schools through school choice. The program is funded through private corporate donations. Donors receive a 100% tax credit for the contribution. Step Up is allowed to keep 3 percent administrative allowance and must give away at least 80 percent of the scholarship donations each year.

Private school scholarships average about $7,000. Transportation scholarships to attend out-of-district public schools are $750. The program is currently capped at $873 million in donations. New eligible students must live in a household with an income that does not exceed 260 percent of the Federal poverty level.

On August 28, 2014, the Florida Education Association, Florida School Boards Association, Florida Congress of Parents and Teachers, Florida Association of School Administrators, League of Women Voters of Florida, Florida State Conference of Branches of NAACP and the Americans United for Separation of Church and State sued the state of Florida, challenging that the scholarship program violated two provisions of the state constitution. The lawsuit was dismissed twice for lack of standing since the scholarship program was funded by private donations. In January 2017, Martin Luther King III joined more than 10,000 parents, students and teachers in a march on the state capital to ask the state teachers' union to drop the lawsuit. On January 18, 2017, the Supreme Court Justices of Florida voted 4-1 to decline jurisdiction over the lawsuit and the case was dismissed.

=== The Gardiner Scholarship ===
The Gardiner Scholarship program is an "education savings account" program for children with special needs. The program was passed in 2014 with a budget of $18 million. Today it serves more than 16,000 students with a budget of more than $180 million. The scholarship program allows children with certain disabilities to have access to special accounts that can be used to pay for private school tuition, fees, textbooks, curriculum, tutoring, therapies, educational technologies and more. Unspent money rolls over from year to year and can be saved for college. The money returns to the state if the student returns to public school full-time, moves out of the state, or has been a non full-time student for three years.

In the summer of 2014, the Florida Education Association sued the state over how the scholarship program passed into law. The lawsuit was dismissed by a trial court judge and the union did not appeal.

=== The Hope Scholarship ===
Step Up manages the Hope Scholarship for victims of bullying, harassment, assault, sexual harassment, and sexual assault. Step Up raises funds through tax credits, worth up to $105, for persons purchasing new or used automobiles in Florida. Scholarships average about $7,000 to attend private schools and $750 to attend an out-of-district public school.

=== The Reading Scholarship ===
Step Up processes applications and manages accounts for Florida's Reading Scholarship program. That scholarship offers parents $500 to be spent on tutoring, text books, summer school programs and more related to improving reading and literacy skills of their children. Students must be in grades 3rd through 5th and have scored a "1" or "2" on their most recent Florida Standards Assessment exam, or attended a school that was listed in the bottom 300 public schools in the 2018-19 school year or received a grade of "D" or "F" in the 2018-19 school year.

=== The Family Empowerment Scholarship ===
The Family Empowerment Scholarship is a voucher program funded by the Florida state legislature. Step Up is contracted with the Florida Department of Education to process applications for new students. Newly eligible students must have attended a public school in the prior year and live in a household with an income that does not exceed 300 percent of the Federal poverty level ($77,250 for a family of four in 2019-20).

== See also ==
- School choice in Florida
