= Fix NICS Act of 2017 =

US law

- Announced in: the 115th United States Congress
- Sponsored by: Henry Cuellar (D-TX)
- Number of co-sponsors: 4

Legislative history
- Introduced in the House as H.R. 4434 by Henry Cuellar (D–TX) on 11/16/2017; Committee consideration by United States House Committee on the Judiciary

Fix NICS Act of 2017
- Announced in: the 115th United States Congress
- Sponsored by: John Culberson (R-TX)
- Number of co-sponsors: 9

Legislative history
- Introduced in the House as H.R. 4477 by John Culberson (R–TX) on 11/29/2017; Committee consideration by United States House Committee on the Judiciary

Fix NICS Act of 2017
- Announced in: the 115th United States Congress
- Sponsored by: John Cornyn (R-TX)
- Number of co-sponsors: 23

Legislative history
- Introduced in the Senate as S. 2135 by John Cornyn (R–TX) on 11/15/2017; Committee consideration by United States Senate Committee on the Judiciary

The Fix NICS Act of 2017 is a United States federal law passed as part of the Consolidated Appropriations Act, 2018 signed as Pub.L.115-141 by President Donald Trump on March 23, 2018. The law applies penalties to government agencies for not reporting to the National Instant Criminal Background Check System (NICS). It was introduced in the 115th United States Congress in the wake of the Sutherland Springs church shooting. It was ultimately passed as Division S, Title VI to the Consolidated Appropriations Act, 2018.

== Provisions ==
=== House of Representatives ===
The House bill contains a provision requiring the United States Justice Department to report on the number of times a bump stock was used in a crime, but does not put any restrictions on bump stocks.

=== Senate ===
The Senate bill contains no provision on bump stocks. The Senate Judiciary Committee is scheduled on December 6, 2017, for a hearing on regulating bump stocks.

== Legislative history ==
Congress	Short title	Bill number(s)	Date introduced	Sponsor(s)	# of cosponsors	Latest status
115th Congress	Fix NICS Act of 2017	H.R. 4434	11/16/2017	Henry Cuellar (D-TX)	4	Referred to the House Committee on the Judiciary. (as of 11/16/2017)
115th Congress	Fix NICS Act of 2017	H.R. 4477	11/29/2017	John Culberson (R-TX)	9	Passed the United States House Committee on the Judiciary by a vote of 17-6 (as of 11/29/2017)
115th Congress	Fix NICS Act of 2017	S. 2135	11/15/2017	John Cornyn (R-TX)	23	Read twice and referred to the Committee on the Judiciary (as of 11/15/2017)

== See also ==
- Concealed Carry Reciprocity Act of 2017
