= Gary Aubuchon =

American politician

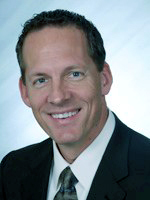

Member of the Florida House of Representatives from the 74 district
- In office 2007–2013
- Preceded by: Jeff Kottkamp
- Succeeded by: Doug Holder

Personal details
- Born: July 10, 1962 (age 64)
- Party: Republican
- Spouse: Andrea Aubuchon
- Children: 3
- Education: University of Michigan (BA)
- Profession: Builder, real estate broker

Gary Aubuchon (born July 10, 1962) is an American real estate broker and politician in the state of Florida. He served in the Florida House of Representatives for the 74th district between 2007 and 2013.

== Early life ==
Aubuchon was born on July 10, 1962, in Ferndale, Michigan. He grew up in Harrison Township, Michigan. In 1984, he earned a Bachelor of Arts degree in history from the University of Michigan and moved to Florida. He married Andrea Aubuchon and the couple have three children: Julia, Jennifer and Madison.

== Career ==
Aubuchon started working as a real estate agent in 1984. In 1992, he founded a construction company, Aubuchon Homes, with his brother Darryl in Cape Coral, Florida. He is the president and CEO. In 2009, Aubuchon's home construction business was involved in a controversy concerning homes that were built with defective Chinese drywall which rendered the homes unusable because of mold.

He was first elected to the Florida House of Representatives in 2006 and won re-election in 2008. In 2009, he chaired the health care services policy committee. He was chair of the legislative delegation for Charlotte County between 2006 and 2008 and for Lee County between 2009 and 2012. He resigned from the legislature in 2012 to run for the United States Congress, although he was ultimately unsuccessful. He is a member of the Republican Party.
