= Money Remittances Improvement Act of 2014 =

- Long title: To allow the Secretary of the Treasury to rely on State examinations for certain financial institutions, and for other purposes.
- Announced in: the 113th United States Congress
- Sponsored by: Rep. Keith Ellison (D, MN-5)
- Number of co-sponsors: 8

Citations
- Public law: Pub. L. 113–156 (text) (PDF)

Codification
- U.S.C. sections affected: 31 U.S.C. § 5318, 12 U.S.C. § 1958, 12 U.S.C. § 1829b
- Agencies affected: United States Department of Transportation, United States Department of the Treasury

Legislative history
- Introduced in the House as H.R. 4386 by Rep. Keith Ellison (D, MN-5) on April 3, 2014; Committee consideration by United States House Committee on Financial Services; Passed the House on May 6, 2014 (voice vote); Passed the Senate on August 1, 2014 (unanimous consent); Signed into law by President Barack Obama on August 8, 2014

The Money Remittances Improvement Act of 2014 (H.R. 4386; Pub. L. 113–156 (text) (PDF)) is a bill that passed in the United States House of Representatives during the 113th United States Congress. The bill would "allow the Treasury secretary to use state examinations for certain financial institutions instead of federal reporting requirements." The bill would make it easier for nonbank financial institutions such as money service businesses to provide remittance payments internationally.

== Background ==
A remittance is a transfer of money by a foreign worker to an individual in his or her home country. Money sent home by migrants competes with international aid as some of the largest financial inflows to developing countries. In 2012, according to the World Bank Report, $401 billion went to developing countries (a new record) with overall global remittances at $514 billion.

Remittances are playing an increasingly large role in the economies of many countries, contributing to economic growth and to the livelihoods of less prosperous people (though generally not the poorest of the poor). According to World Bank estimates, remittances totaled US$414 billion in 2009, of which US$316 billion went to developing countries that involved 192 million migrant workers. For some individual recipient countries, remittances can be as high as a third of their GDP. As remittance receivers often have a higher propensity to own a bank account, remittances promote access to financial services for the sender and recipient, an essential aspect of leveraging remittances to promote economic development. According to some social scientists remittances have social significance that extends well beyond the mere financial dimensions.

== Provisions of the bill ==
According to the summary provided by House Republicans, H.R. 4386 grants authorization to the Secretary of the Treasury regarding compliance with monetary instrument transaction reporting requirements. The Secretary is permitted to rely on examinations conducted by the relevant state supervisory agency under the following conditions: 1)If the category of financial institution is mandated by state law to comply with federal requirements. 2)If the state supervisory agency is authorized to ensure that the financial institution complies with federal requirements.

== Procedural history ==
The Money Remittances Improvement Act of 2014 was introduced into the United States House of Representatives on April 3, 2014 by Rep. Keith Ellison (D, MN-5). It was referred to the United States House Committee on Financial Services. The bill was passed in a voice vote on May 6, 2014. The United States Senate voted with unanimous consent to pass the bill on August 1, 2014 and President Barack Obama signed the bill into law on August 8, 2014.

== Debate and discussion ==
On May 6, 2014, Rep. Ellison said that "passage of the Money Remittances Improvement Act is cause for celebration for all diaspora communities, including the Somali and Hmong communities I am proud to represent in Minnesota."

Rep. Erik Paulsen (R-MN), another supporter of the bill, argued that the bill would make it easier for American immigrants "supporting their extended families overseas" to help their relatives, while still "providing the necessary safeguards to ensure their money reaches its intended destination." The bill would help these people by "streamlining the remittance process and eliminating regulatory barriers to sending money home."

The list of organizations who support the bill include the Conference of State Bank Supervisors, Money Transmitter Regulators Association, Oxfam America, African Development Solutions (ADESO), the Somali American Remittances association, Tawakal Money Express, Kaah Express, Dahab-shiil, Amal USA Inc, and the Somali Action Alliance, and The Confederation of Somali Community in Minnesota.

== See also ==
- List of bills in the 113th United States Congress
