= 113th United States Congress =

2013–2015 U.S. legislative term

←	112th	114th	→
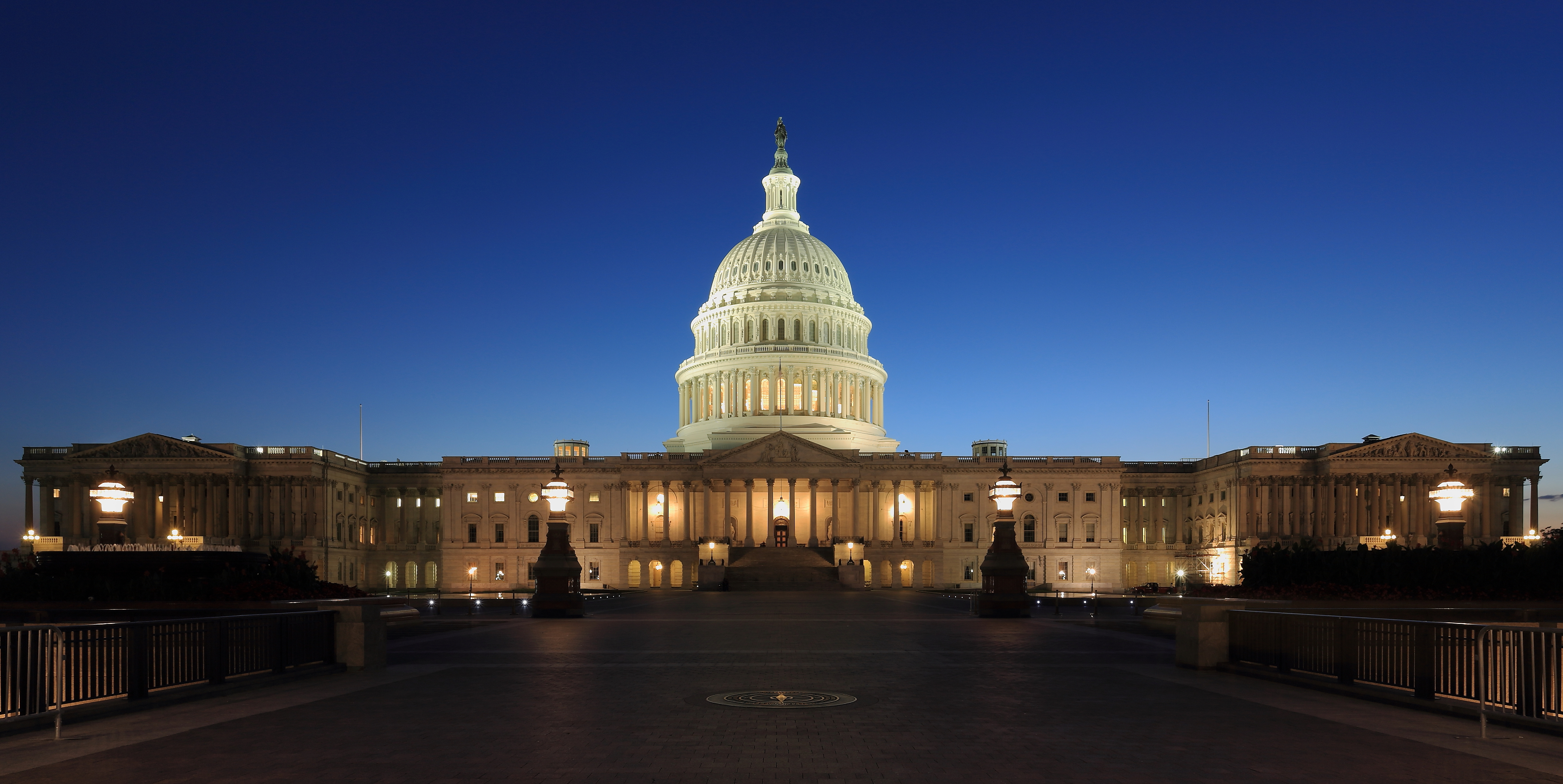
- United States Capitol (2013)

Overview
- Legislative body: United States Congress
- Jurisdiction: United States
- Term: January 3, 2013 – January 3, 2015

Senate
- Members: 100
- President: Joe Biden (D)
- President pro tempore: Patrick Leahy (D)
- Party control: Democratic

House of Representatives
- Members: 435 representatives 6 non-voting delegates
- Speaker: John Boehner (R)
- Party control: Republican

Sessions
- 1st: January 3, 2013 – December 26, 2013
- 2nd: January 3, 2014 – December 16, 2014

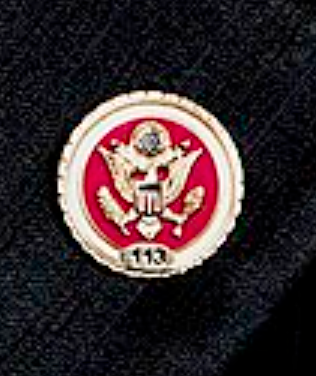
House of Representatives member pin for the 113th U.S. Congress

The 113th United States Congress was a meeting of the legislative branch of the United States federal government, from January 3, 2013, to January 3, 2015, during the fifth and sixth years of Barack Obama's presidency. It was composed of the United States Senate and the United States House of Representatives based on the results of the 2012 Senate elections and the 2012 House elections. The seats in the House were apportioned based on the 2010 United States census. It first met in Washington, D.C., on January 3, 2013, and it ended on January 3, 2015. Senators elected to regular terms in 2008 were in the last two years of those terms during this Congress.

The Senate had a Democratic majority, while the House had a Republican majority; such a split would not be repeated until the 118th Congress. This was the last time Democrats held control of the Senate until the 117th Congress in 2021.

== Major events ==
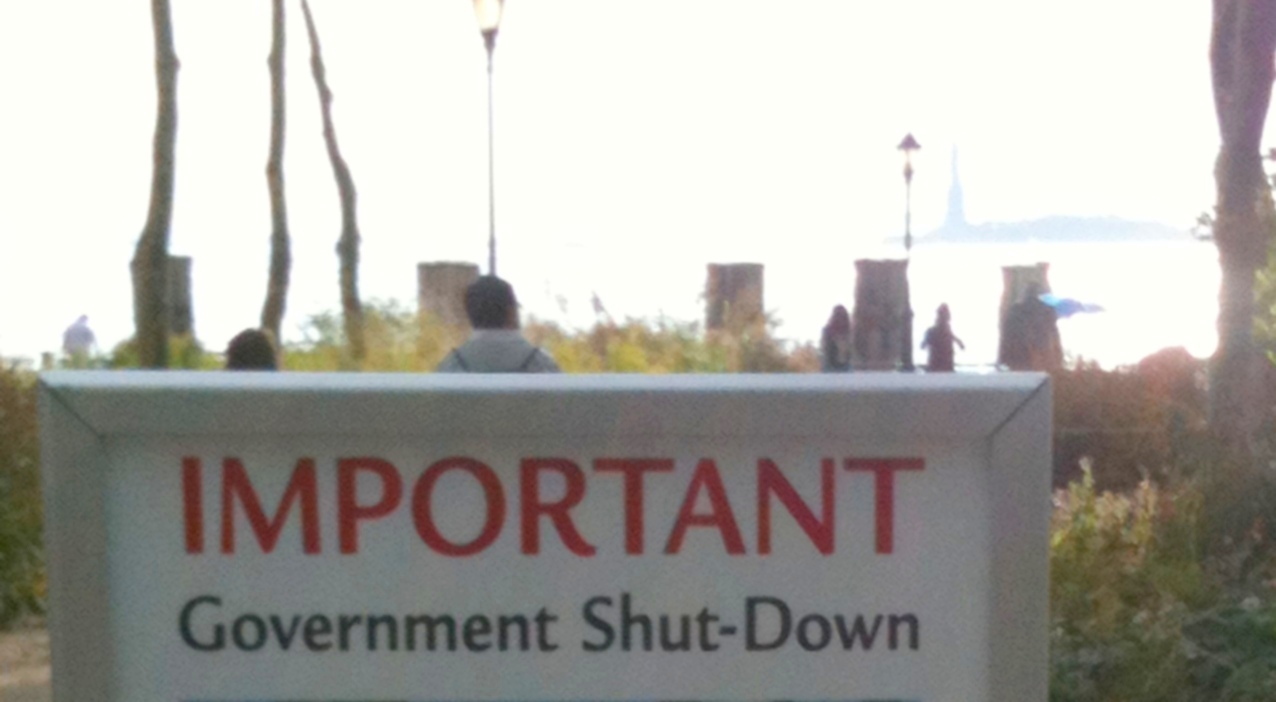
A government shutdown notice posted on October 1, 2013, with the Statue of Liberty in the far background

- January 4, 2013: Joint session to count the Electoral College votes for the 2012 presidential election.
- January 20–21, 2013: Second inauguration of President Barack Obama. The term began January 20, but because that was a Sunday, the Joint Committee on Inaugural Ceremonies scheduled the inauguration ceremony for the next day.
- February 1, 2013: Senator Mo Cowan began his term after being appointed by Massachusetts governor Deval Patrick. Serving alongside Senator Tim Scott of South Carolina, this marked the first time that two African Americans served concurrently in the Senate.
- February 12, 2013: Joint session to hear the 2013 State of the Union Address.
- March 6–7, 2013: Senator Rand Paul led a filibuster of the nomination of John O. Brennan for Director of the Central Intelligence Agency with a 12-hour, 52-minute speech.
- June 5, 2013: The first media reports of Edward Snowden's surveillance disclosures surfaced in the media.
- June 25, 2013: The Supreme Court struck down section 4(b) of the Voting Rights Act of 1965 in Shelby County v. Holder, ending the need for some counties and states to receive preclearance from the Justice Department before changing election laws.
- June 26, 2013: The Supreme Court struck down section 3 of the Defense of Marriage Act in United States v. Windsor, forcing the federal government to acknowledge same-sex marriages granted under the laws of states.
- July 16, 2013: The Senate reached a deal to allow some presidential nominations to come to a vote, avoiding the nuclear option for filibuster reform.
- September 24–25, 2013: Senator Ted Cruz delivered a 21-hour, 19-minute speech, one of the longest in Senate history, in opposition to the Affordable Care Act. Cruz's speech was not a filibuster, as it delayed no vote.
- October 1–17, 2013: The United States federal government was shut down as most routine operations were curtailed after Congress failed to enact legislation appropriating funds for fiscal year 2014, or a continuing resolution for the interim authorization of appropriations for fiscal year 2014.
- October 3, 2013: The shooting of Miriam Carey occurs.
- November 21, 2013: In a 52–48 vote, the Senate ended the use of the filibuster on all executive branch nominees, as well as on most judicial nominees. The filibuster remained in place for Supreme Court nominees and for legislation.
- November 4, 2014: United States elections, 2014, including United States Senate elections, 2014 and United States House of Representatives elections, 2014.

== Major legislation ==
=== Enacted ===
- January 10, 2013: Katie Sepich Enhanced DNA Collection Act of 2012 (Katie's Law), Pub.L. 111-253
- March 7, 2013: Violence Against Women Reauthorization Act of 2013, Pub. L. 113–4 (text) (PDF)
- March 13, 2013: Pandemic and All-Hazards Preparedness Reauthorization Act of 2013, Pub. L. 113–5 (text) (PDF)
- March 26, 2013: 2013 United States federal budget (as Consolidated and Further Continuing Appropriations Act, 2013), Pub. L. 113–6 (text) (PDF)
- June 3, 2013: Stolen Valor Act of 2013, Pub. L. 113–12 (text) (PDF)
- June 3, 2013: Freedom to Fish Act, Pub.L. 113-13
- June 9, 2013: Sandia Pueblo Settlement Technical Amendment Act, Pub.L. 113-19
- June 13, 2013: Animal Drug and Animal Generic Drug User Fee Reauthorization Act, Pub.L. 113-14
- July 18, 2013: South Utah Valley Electric Conveyance Act, Pub.L. 113-19
- July 18, 2013: Bonneville Unit Clean Hydropower Facilitation Act, Pub.L. 113-20
- August 9, 2013: Hydropower Regulatory Efficiency Act of 2013, Pub. L. 113–23 (text) (PDF)
- August 9, 2013: FOR VETS Act of 2013, Pub.L. 113-26
- August 9, 2013: Bipartisan Student Loan Certainty Act of 2013, Pub. L. 113–28 (text) (PDF)
- September 18, 2013: Powell Shooting Range Land Conveyance Act, Pub.L. 113-32
- September 30, 2013: Missing Children's Assistance Reauthorization Act of 2013, Pub.L. 113-38
- September 30, 2013: Pay Our Military Act, Pub. L. 113–39 (text) (PDF)
- October 2, 2013: Organization of American States Revitalization and Reform Act of 2013, Pub.L. 113-41
- October 4, 2013: Congressional Award Program Reauthorization Act of 2013, Pub.L. 113-43
- October 17, 2013: Continuing Appropriations Act, 2014, Pub.L. 113-46
- October 31, 2013: United States Parole Commission Extension Act of 2013, Pub.L. 113-47
- November 21, 2013: Streamlining Claims Processing for Federal Contractor Employees Act, Pub.L. 113-50
- November 21, 2013: HIV Organ Policy Equity (HOPE) Act, Pub.L. 113-51
- November 27, 2013: Small Airplane Revitalization Act of 2013, Pub.L. 113-53
- November 27, 2013: Drug Quality and Security Act, Pub. L. 113–54 (text) (PDF)
- November 27, 2013: PREEMIE Reauthorization Act, Pub.L. 113-55
- December 20, 2013: Community Fire Safety Act of 2013, Pub.L. 113-64
- December 26, 2013: National Defense Authorization Act for Fiscal Year 2014, Pub. L. 113–66 (text) (PDF)
- December 26, 2013: Bipartisan Budget Act of 2013, Pub.L. 113-67
- December 26, 2013: Alaska Native Tribal Health Consortium Land Transfer Act, Pub.L. 113-68
- January 17, 2014: Consolidated Appropriations Act, 2014, Pub. L. 113–76 (text) (PDF)
- February 7, 2014: Agricultural Act of 2014, Pub. L. 113–79 (text) (PDF)
- February 12, 2014: Support for United States-Republic of Korea Civil Nuclear Cooperation Act, Pub.L. 113-81
- March 6, 2014: National Integrated Drought Information System Reauthorization Act of 2013, Pub.L. 113-86
- March 13, 2014: Sleeping Bear Dunes National Lakeshore Conservation and Recreation Act, Pub.L. 113-87
- March 21, 2014: Homeowner Flood Insurance Affordability Act of 2014, Pub. L. 113–89 (text) (PDF)
- March 21, 2014: Home Heating Emergency Assistance Through Transportation (HHEATT) Act, Pub.L. 113-90
- March 25, 2014: Philippines Charitable Giving Assistance Act, Pub.L. 113-92
- April 3, 2014: Gabriella Miller Kids First Research Act, Pub. L. 113–94 (text) (PDF)
- April 3, 2014: Support for the Sovereignty, Integrity, Democracy, and Economic Stability of Ukraine Act of 2014, Pub. L. 113–95 (text) (PDF)
- April 3, 2014: United States International Programming to Ukraine and Neighboring Regions Act, Pub.L. 113-96
- April 7, 2014: Cooperative and Small Employer Charity Pension Flexibility Act, Pub.L. 113-97
- April 7, 2014: Children's Hospital GME Support Reauthorization Act of 2013, Pub.L. 113-98
- May 9, 2014: Digital Accountability and Transparency Act (DATA), Pub. L. 113–101 (text) (PDF)
- May 20, 2014: Kilah Davenport Child Protection Act, Pub. L. 113–104 (text) (PDF)
- June 9, 2014: North Texas Invasive Species Barrier Act of 2014, Pub.L. 113-117
- June 10, 2014: Water Resources Reform and Development Act, Pub. L. 113–121 (text) (PDF)
- June 30, 2014: Collinsville Renewable Energy Promotion Act, Pub.L. 113-122
- June 30, 2014: Reliable Home Heating Act, Pub.L. 113-125
- July 7, 2014: Intelligence Authorization Act for Fiscal Year 2014, Pub.L. 113-126
- July 23, 2014: Workforce Innovation and Opportunity Act, Pub. L. 113–128 (text) (PDF)
- July 25, 2014: Black Hills Cemetery Act, Pub.L. 113-131
- July 25, 2014: Hill Creek Cultural Preservation and Energy Development Act, Pub.L. 113-133
- July 25, 2014: Three Kids Mine Remediation and Reclamation Act, Pub. L. 113-135
- July 25, 2014: Lake Hills Administrative Site Affordable Housing Act, Pub.L. 113-141
- July 25, 2014: Huna Tlingit Traditional Gull Egg Use Act, Pub.L. 113-142
- August 1, 2014: Veterinary Medicine Mobility Act, Pub.L. 113-143
- August 1, 2014: Unlocking Consumer Choice and Wireless Competition Act, Pub. L. 113–144 (text) (PDF)
- August 7, 2014: Veterans' Access to Care through Choice, Accountability, and Transparency Act of 2014, Pub. L. 113–146 (text) (PDF)
- August 8, 2014: Improving Trauma Care Act, Pub.L. 113-152
- August 8, 2014: Money Remittances Improvement Act, Pub.L. 113-156
- August 8, 2014: Autism CARES Act of 2014, Pub.L. 113-157
- August 8, 2014: Emergency Afghan Allies Extension Act of 2014, Pub.L. 113-160
- August 8, 2014: Victims of Child Abuse Act Reauthorization Act of 2013, Pub.L. 113-163
- September 19, 2014: Continuing Appropriations Resolution, 2015, Pub.L. 113-164
- September 26, 2014: Paul D. Wellstone Muscular Dystrophy Community Assistance, Research and Education Amendments of 2013, Pub.L. 113-166
- September 26, 2014: All Circuit Review Extension Act, Pub.L. 113-170
- September 26, 2014: Gun Lake Trust Land Reaffirmation Act, Pub.L. 113-179
- September 26, 2014: Emergency Medical Services for Children Reauthorization Act of 2014, Pub.L. 113-180
- September 29, 2014: Preventing Sex Trafficking and Strengthening Families Act, Pub. L. 113–183 (text) (PDF)
- October 6, 2014: IMPACT Act of 2014, Pub. L. 113–185 (text) (PDF)
- November 26, 2014: Presidential and Federal Records Act Amendments of 2014, Pub. L. 113–187 (text) (PDF)
- November 26, 2014: Government Reports Elimination Act of 2014, Pub. L. 113–188 (text) (PDF)
- November 26, 2014: Sunscreen Innovation Act, Pub.L. 113-195
- December 4, 2014: STELA Reauthorization Act of 2014, Pub.L. 113-200
- December 16, 2014: Honor Flight Act, Pub.L. 113-221
- December 18, 2014: Permanent Electronic Duck Stamp Act of 2013, Pub.L. 113-239
- December 18, 2014: Death in Custody Reporting Act of 2013, Pub. L. 113–242 (text) (PDF)
- December 18, 2014: Transportation Security Acquisition Reform Act, Pub. L. 113–245 (text) (PDF)
- December 18, 2014: American Savings Promotion Act, Pub. L. 113–251 (text) (PDF)
- December 18, 2014: Credit Union Share Insurance Fund Parity Act, Pub. L. 113–252 (text) (PDF)
- December 18, 2014: Smart Savings Act, Pub.L. 113-255
- December 18, 2014: Designer Anabolic Steroid Control Act of 2014, Pub.L. 113-260
- December 18, 2014: EPS Service Parts Act of 2014 Pub. L. 113–263 (text) (PDF)
- December 18, 2014: Ukraine Freedom Support Act of 2014, Pub. L. 113-272
- December 18, 2014: Transportation Security Acquisition Reform Act, Pub.L. 113-275
- December 18, 2014: Venezuela Defense of Human Rights and Civil Society Act of 2014, Pub. L. 113–278 (text) (PDF)
- December 18, 2014: Insurance Capital Standards Clarification Act of 2014, Pub. L. 113–279 (text) (PDF)
- December 18, 2014: Howard Coble Coast Guard and Maritime Transportation Act of 2014, Pub.L. 113-281
- December 18, 2014: Federal Information Security Modernization Act of 2014, Pub.L. 113-283
- December 19, 2014: Carl Levin and Howard P. "Buck" McKeon National Defense Authorization Act for Fiscal Year 2015, Pub.L. 113-291
- December 19, 2014: United States-Israel Strategic Partnership Act of 2014, Pub.L. 113-296

=== Proposed ===
- 2014 United States federal budget: H.Con.Res. 25, S.Con.Res. 8
- Assault Weapons Ban of 2013 (S. 150) - Introduced after Sandy Hook Elementary School shooting
- Justice Safety Valve Act of 2013: S. 619, H.R. 1695
- Marketplace Fairness Act of 2013: (H.R. 684, S. 743) - Also known as the "Internet Sales Tax"
- Border Security, Economic Opportunity, and Immigration Modernization Act of 2013 (S. 744) - Also known as the immigration bill

=== Appropriations bills ===
==== Fiscal year 2014 ====
Fiscal year 2014 runs from October 1, 2013, to September 30, 2014.

- Military Construction and Veterans Affairs, and Related Agencies Appropriations Act, 2014 (H.R. 2216) - proposed
- Department of Homeland Security Appropriations Act, 2014 (H.R. 2217) - proposed
- Energy and Water Development and Related Agencies Appropriations Act, 2014 (H.R. 2609) - proposed

==== Fiscal year 2015 ====
Fiscal year 2015 runs from October 1, 2014, to September 20, 2015.

- Agriculture, Rural Development, Food and Drug Administration, and Related Agencies Appropriations Act, 2015 (H.R. 4800) - considered in the House on June 11, 2014. The bill would appropriate $20.9 billion.
- Commerce, Justice, Science, and Related Agencies Appropriations Act, 2015 (H.R. 4660) - passed the House on May 30, 2014. The total amount of money appropriated in the bill was $51.2 billion, approximately $400 million less than fiscal year 2014.
- Department of Defense Appropriations Act, 2015 - considered in the House on June 18, 2014. The bill would provide funding of approximately $491 billion.
- Energy and Water Development and Related Agencies Appropriations Act, 2015 (H.R. 4923; 113th Congress) (H.R. 4923) - The bill would appropriate $34 billion to the United States Department of Energy, the United States Army Corps of Engineers, and related agencies.
- Legislative Branch Appropriations Act, 2015 (H.R. 4487) - passed in the House on May 1, 2014. The bill would appropriate $3.3 billion to the legislative branch for FY 2015.
- Military Construction and Veterans Affairs and Related Agencies Appropriations Act, 2015 (H.R. 4486) - passed the House on April 30, 2014. The total amount appropriated by the introduced version of the bill is $71.5 billion.
- Transportation, Housing and Urban Development, and Related Agencies Appropriations Act, 2015 (H.R. 4745 or "THUD") - passed the House on June 10, 2014. The bill would appropriate $17 billion to the Department of Transportation and $40.3 billion to the Department of Housing and Urban Development.

== Party summary ==
Resignations and new members are discussed in the "Changes in membership" section, below.

=== Senate ===
Final Senate Membership 53 Democrats 45 Republicans 2 Independents, caucusing with Democrats

	Party (Shading indicates majority caucus)			Total	Vacant
	Democratic	Independent (caucusing with Democrats)	Republican	Total	Vacant
End of previous Congress	51	2	47	100	0
Begin	53	2	45	100	0
June 3, 2013 (Note: In New Jersey, Frank Lautenberg (D) died June 3, 2013, and Jeffrey Chiesa (R) was appointed June 6, 2013, to continue the term. Cory Booker (D) was elected October 16, 2013, to finish the term.)	52	2	45	99	1
June 6, 2013	52	2	46	100	0
October 31, 2013	53	2	45	100	0
February 6, 2014 (Note: In Montana, Max Baucus (D) resigned February 6, 2014, and John Walsh (D) was appointed February 9, 2014, to continue the term.)	52	2	45	99	1
February 9, 2014	53	2	45	100	0
Final voting share	55%		45%		
Beginning of the next Congress	44	2	54	100	0

=== House of Representatives ===
Final House Membership 201 Democrats 234 Republicans

	Party (Shading indicates majority caucus)		Total	Vacant
	Democratic	Republican	Total	Vacant
End of previous Congress	191	240	431	4
Begin (Note: In Illinois's 2nd district: Jesse Jackson Jr. (D) resigned during the previous Congress, and Robin Kelly (D) was elected April 9, 2013.) (Note: In South Carolina's 1st district: Tim Scott (R) resigned during the previous Congress, and Mark Sanford (R) was elected May 7, 2013.)	200	233	433	2
January 22, 2013 (Note: In Missouri's 8th district: Jo Ann Emerson (R) resigned January 22, 2013, and Jason Smith (R) was elected June 4, 2013.)	200	232	432	3
April 9, 2013	201	232	433	2
May 7, 2013	201	233	434	1
June 4, 2013	201	234	435	0
July 15, 2013 (Note: In Massachusetts's 5th district: Ed Markey (D) resigned July 15, 2013, and Katherine Clark (D) was elected December 10, 2013.)	200	234	434	1
August 2, 2013 (Note: In Alabama's 1st district: Jo Bonner (R) resigned August 2, 2013, and Bradley Byrne (R) was elected December 17, 2013.)	200	233	433	2
September 26, 2013 (Note: In Louisiana's 5th district: Rodney Alexander (R) resigned September 25, 2013, and Vance McAllister (R) was elected November 16, 2013.)	200	232	432	3
October 18, 2013 (Note: In Florida's 13th district: Bill Young (R) died October 18, 2013, and David Jolly (R) was elected March 11, 2014.)	200	231	431	4
November 16, 2013	200	232	432	3
December 10, 2013	201	232	433	2
December 17, 2013	201	233	434	1
January 6, 2014 (Note: In North Carolina's 12th district: Mel Watt (D) resigned January 6, 2014, and Alma Adams (D) was elected November 4, 2014.)	200	233	433	2
January 27, 2014 (Note: In Florida's 19th district: Trey Radel (R) resigned January 27, 2014, and Curt Clawson (R) was elected June 24, 2014.)	200	232	432	3
February 18, 2014 (Note: In New Jersey's 1st district: Rob Andrews (D) resigned February 18, 2014, and Donald Norcross (D) was elected November 4, 2014.)	199	232	431	4
March 11, 2014	199	233	432	3
June 24, 2014	199	234	433	2
August 18, 2014 (Note: In Virginia's 7th district: Eric Cantor (R) resigned August 18, 2014, and Dave Brat (R) was elected November 4, 2014.)	199	233	432	3
November 4, 2014	201	234	435	0
Final voting share	46.2%	53.8%		
Non-voting members	6	0	6	0
Beginning of the next Congress	188	247	435	0

== Leadership ==
Section contents: Senate: Majority (D), Minority (R) • House: Majority (R), Minority (D)

=== Senate ===
Senate President

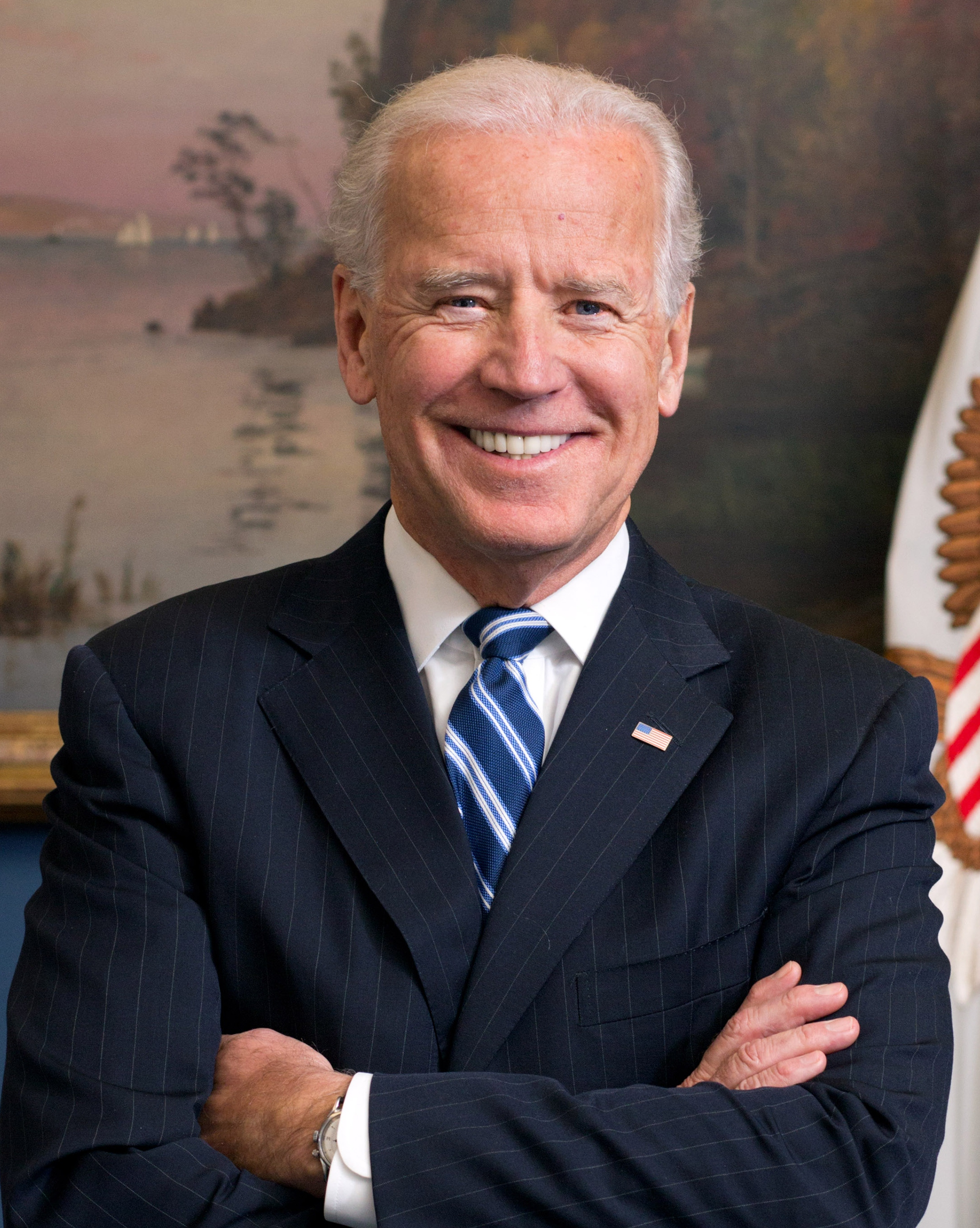
Joe Biden (D)

Senate President pro tempore

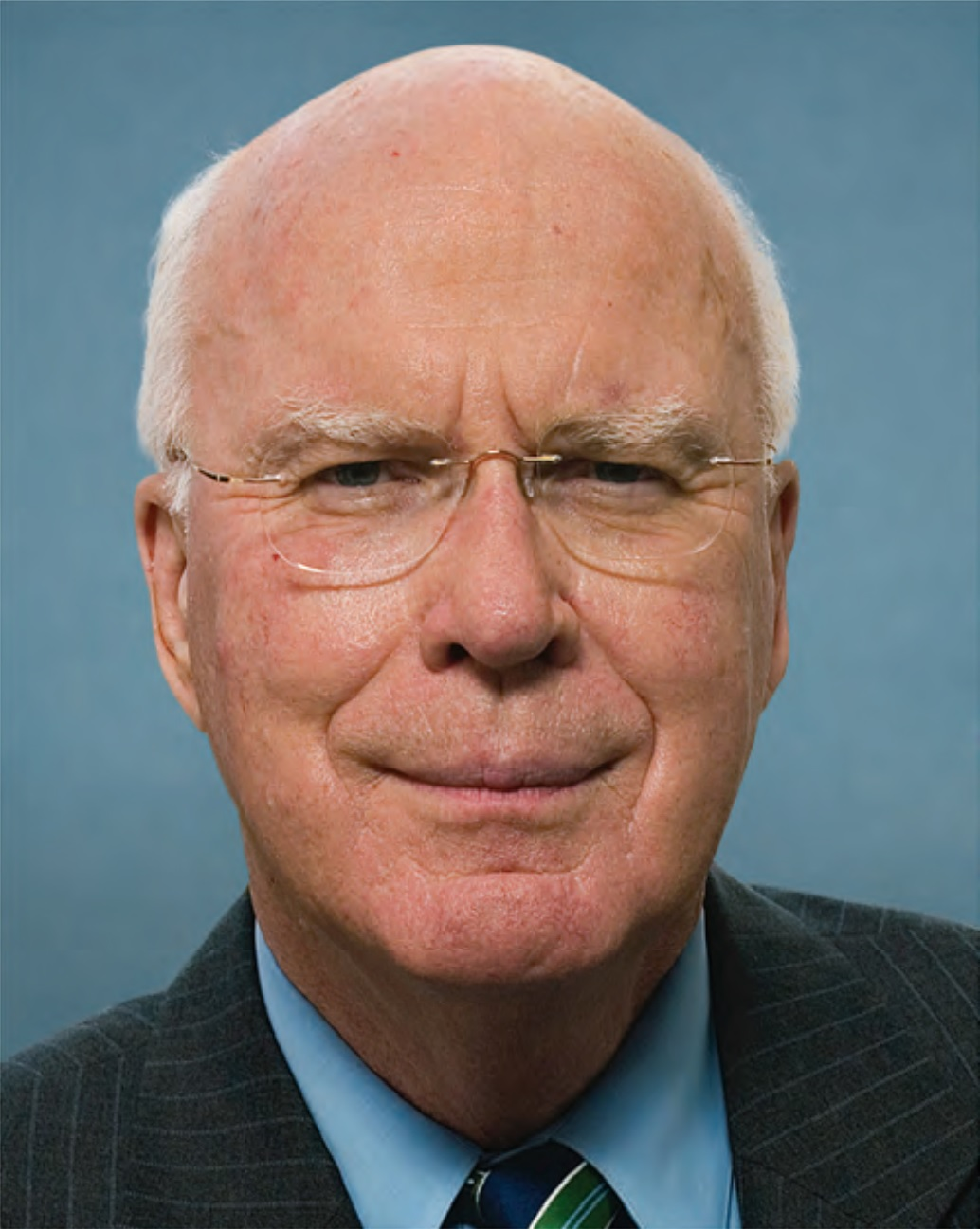
Patrick Leahy (D)

- President: Joe Biden (D)
- President pro tempore: Patrick Leahy (D)

==== Majority (Democratic) leadership ====
- Majority Leader and Caucus Chairman: Harry Reid
- Assistant Majority Leader (Majority Whip): Dick Durbin
- Democratic Caucus Vice Chairman and Policy Committee Chairman: Chuck Schumer
- Democratic Caucus Secretary: Patty Murray
- Senatorial Campaign Committee Chairman: Michael Bennet
- Policy Committee Vice Chairman: Debbie Stabenow
- Steering and Outreach Committee Chairman: Mark Begich
- Steering and Outreach Committee Vice Chairman: Jeanne Shaheen
- Chief Deputy Whip: Barbara Boxer

==== Minority (Republican) leadership ====
- Minority Leader: Mitch McConnell
- Assistant Minority Leader (Minority Whip): John Cornyn
- Republican Conference Chairman: John Thune
- Republican Conference Vice Chairman: Roy Blunt
- Senatorial Committee Chair: Jerry Moran
- Policy Committee Chairman: John Barrasso
- Deputy Whips: Roy Blunt, Richard Burr, Mike Crapo, Saxby Chambliss, Rob Portman, David Vitter, Roger Wicker

=== House of Representatives ===
Speaker of the House

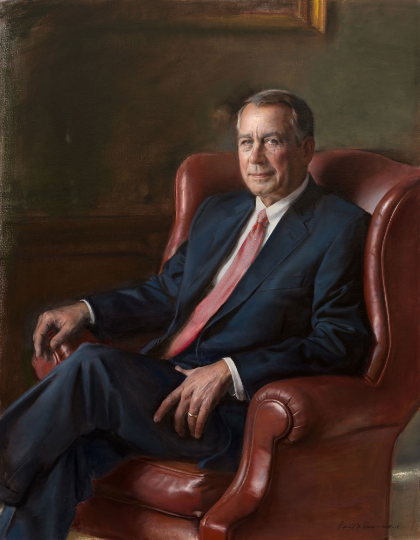
John Boehner (R)

- Speaker: John Boehner (R)

==== Majority (Republican) leadership ====
- Majority Leader: Eric Cantor, until August 1, 2014
  - Kevin McCarthy, from August 1, 2014
- Majority Whip: Kevin McCarthy, until August 1, 2014
  - Steve Scalise, from August 1, 2014
- Majority Chief Deputy Whip: Peter Roskam, until August 1, 2014
  - Patrick McHenry, from August 1, 2014
- Republican Conference Chairwoman: Cathy McMorris Rodgers
- Republican Conference Vice-Chairwoman: Lynn Jenkins
- Republican Conference Secretary: Virginia Foxx
- Republican Campaign Committee Chairman: Greg Walden
- Policy Committee Chairman: James Lankford
- Campaign Committee Deputy Chairman: Lynn Westmoreland

==== Minority (Democratic) leadership ====
- Minority Leader: Nancy Pelosi
- Minority Whip: Steny Hoyer
- Assistant Democratic Leader: Jim Clyburn
- Democratic Caucus Chairman: Xavier Becerra
- Democratic Caucus Vice-Chairman: Joseph Crowley
- Democratic Campaign Committee Chairman: Steve Israel
- Steering and Policy Committee Co-Chairs: Rosa DeLauro (Steering) and Rob Andrews (Policy, until February 18, 2014); George Miller (Policy, from March 24, 2014)
- Organization, Study, and Review Chairman: Mike Capuano
- Senior Chief Deputy Minority Whip: John Lewis
- Chief Deputy Minority Whips: Terri Sewell, Keith Ellison, Jim Matheson, Ben R. Luján, Jan Schakowsky, Diana DeGette, G. K. Butterfield, Debbie Wasserman Schultz, Peter Welch

== Members ==
=== Senate ===
Senators are listed by state, and the numbers refer to their Senate classes, In this Congress, Class 2 meant their term ended with this Congress, requiring re-election in 2014; Class 3 meant their term began in the last Congress, requiring re-election in 2016; and Class 1 meant their term began in this Congress, requiring re-election in 2018.

==== Alabama ====
▌2. Jeff Sessions (R)
▌3. Richard Shelby (R)

==== Alaska ====
▌2. Mark Begich (D)
▌3. Lisa Murkowski (R)

==== Arizona ====
▌1. Jeff Flake (R)
▌3. John McCain (R)

==== Arkansas ====
▌2. Mark Pryor (D)
▌3. John Boozman (R)

==== California ====
▌1. Dianne Feinstein (D)
▌3. Barbara Boxer (D)

==== Colorado ====
▌2. Mark Udall (D)
▌3. Michael Bennet (D)

==== Connecticut ====
▌1. Chris Murphy (D)
▌3. Richard Blumenthal (D)

==== Delaware ====
▌1. Tom Carper (D)
▌2. Chris Coons (D)

==== Florida ====
▌1. Bill Nelson (D)
▌3. Marco Rubio (R)

==== Georgia ====
▌2. Saxby Chambliss (R)
▌3. Johnny Isakson (R)

==== Hawaii ====
▌1. Mazie Hirono (D)
▌3. Brian Schatz (D)

==== Idaho ====
▌2. Jim Risch (R)
▌3. Mike Crapo (R)

==== Illinois ====
▌2. Dick Durbin (D)
▌3. Mark Kirk (R)

==== Indiana ====
▌1. Joe Donnelly (D)
▌3. Dan Coats (R)

==== Iowa ====
▌2. Tom Harkin (D)
▌3. Chuck Grassley (R)

==== Kansas ====
▌2. Pat Roberts (R)
▌3. Jerry Moran (R)

==== Kentucky ====
▌2. Mitch McConnell (R)
▌3. Rand Paul (R)

==== Louisiana ====
▌2. Mary Landrieu (D)
▌3. David Vitter (R)

==== Maine ====
▌1. Angus King (I)
▌2. Susan Collins (R)

==== Maryland ====
▌1. Ben Cardin (D)
▌3. Barbara Mikulski (D)

==== Massachusetts ====
▌1. Elizabeth Warren (D)
▌2. John Kerry (D), until February 1, 2013

▌Mo Cowan (D), February 1, 2013 – July 16, 2013
▌Ed Markey (D), from July 16, 2013

==== Michigan ====
▌1. Debbie Stabenow (D)
▌2. Carl Levin (D)

==== Minnesota ====
▌1. Amy Klobuchar (DFL) (Note: The Minnesota Democratic–Farmer–Labor Party (DFL) and the North Dakota Democratic-Nonpartisan League Party (D-NPL) are the Minnesota and North Dakota affiliates of the U.S. Democratic Party and are counted as Democrats.)
▌2. Al Franken (DFL)

==== Mississippi ====
▌1. Roger Wicker (R)
▌2. Thad Cochran (R)

==== Missouri ====
▌1. Claire McCaskill (D)
▌3. Roy Blunt (R)

==== Montana ====
▌1. Jon Tester (D)
▌2. Max Baucus (D), until February 6, 2014

▌John Walsh (D), from February 9, 2014

==== Nebraska ====
▌1. Deb Fischer (R)
▌2. Mike Johanns (R)

==== Nevada ====
▌1. Dean Heller (R)
▌3. Harry Reid (D)

==== New Hampshire ====
▌2. Jeanne Shaheen (D)
▌3. Kelly Ayotte (R)

==== New Jersey ====
▌1. Bob Menendez (D)
▌2. Frank Lautenberg (D), until June 3, 2013

▌Jeffrey Chiesa (R), June 6, 2013 – October 31, 2013
▌Cory Booker (D), from October 31, 2013

==== New Mexico ====
▌1. Martin Heinrich (D)
▌2. Tom Udall (D)

==== New York ====
▌1. Kirsten Gillibrand (D)
▌3. Chuck Schumer (D)

==== North Carolina ====
▌2. Kay Hagan (D)
▌3. Richard Burr (R)

==== North Dakota ====
▌1. Heidi Heitkamp (D-NPL)
▌3. John Hoeven (R)

==== Ohio ====
▌1. Sherrod Brown (D)
▌3. Rob Portman (R)

==== Oklahoma ====
▌2. Jim Inhofe (R)
▌3. Tom Coburn (R)

==== Oregon ====
▌2. Jeff Merkley (D)
▌3. Ron Wyden (D)

==== Pennsylvania ====
▌1. Bob Casey Jr. (D)
▌3. Pat Toomey (R)

==== Rhode Island ====
▌1. Sheldon Whitehouse (D)
▌2. Jack Reed (D)

==== South Carolina ====
▌2. Lindsey Graham (R)
▌3. Tim Scott (R)

==== South Dakota ====
▌2. Tim Johnson (D)
▌3. John Thune (R)

==== Tennessee ====
▌1. Bob Corker (R)
▌2. Lamar Alexander (R)

==== Texas ====
▌1. Ted Cruz (R)
▌2. John Cornyn (R)

==== Utah ====
▌1. Orrin Hatch (R)
▌3. Mike Lee (R)

==== Vermont ====
▌1. Bernie Sanders (I)
▌3. Patrick Leahy (D)

==== Virginia ====
▌1. Tim Kaine (D)
▌2. Mark Warner (D)

==== Washington ====
▌1. Maria Cantwell (D)
▌3. Patty Murray (D)

==== West Virginia ====
▌1. Joe Manchin (D)
▌2. Jay Rockefeller (D)

==== Wisconsin ====
▌1. Tammy Baldwin (D)
▌3. Ron Johnson (R)

==== Wyoming ====
▌1. John Barrasso (R)
▌2. Mike Enzi (R)

Party membership of the Senate, by state 2 Democrats 2 Republicans 1 Democrat and 1 Republican 1 Independent (caucuses with Democrats) and 1 Democrat 1 Independent (caucuses with Democrats) and 1 Republican

Senate Majority Leaders

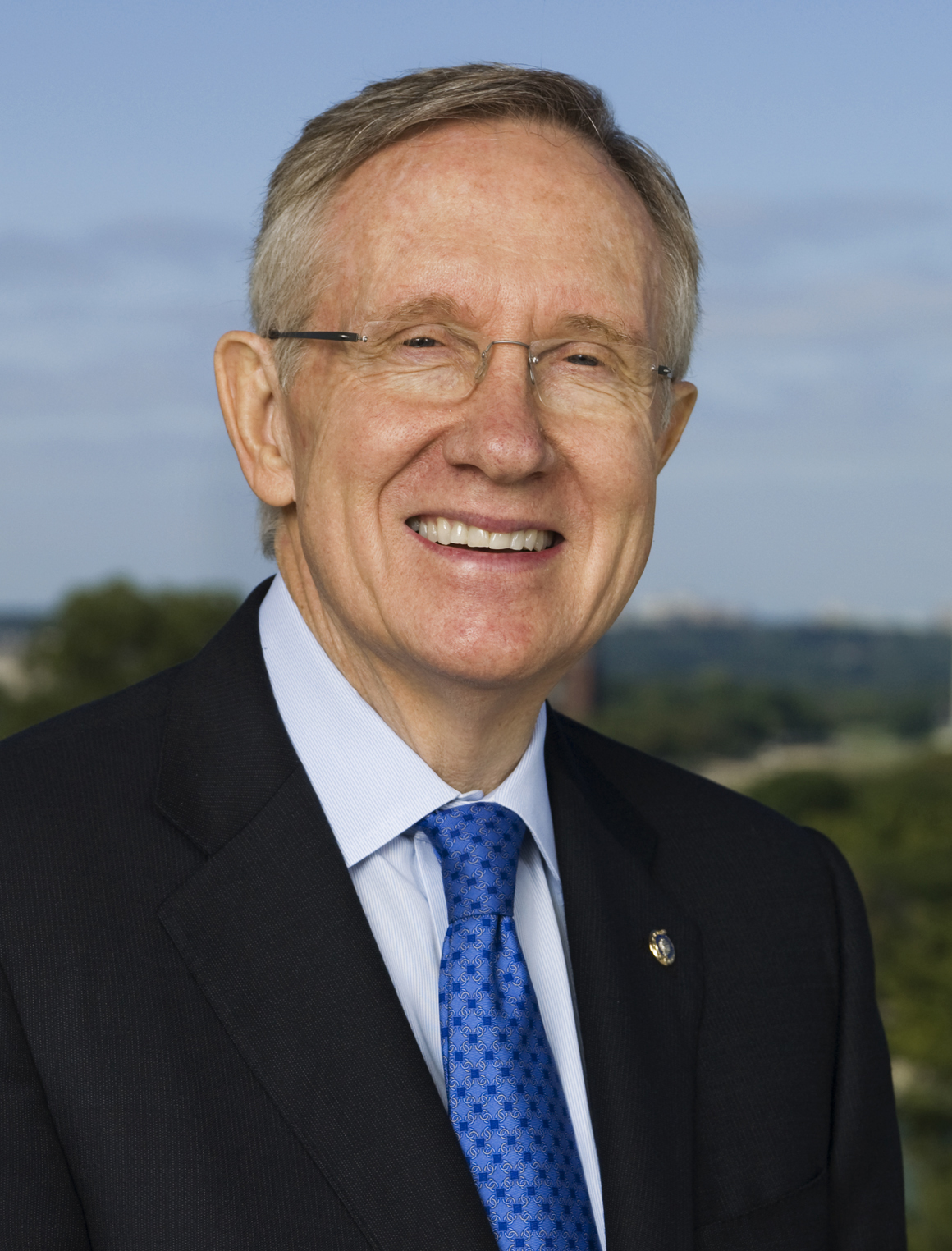
Democratic Leader
Harry Reid

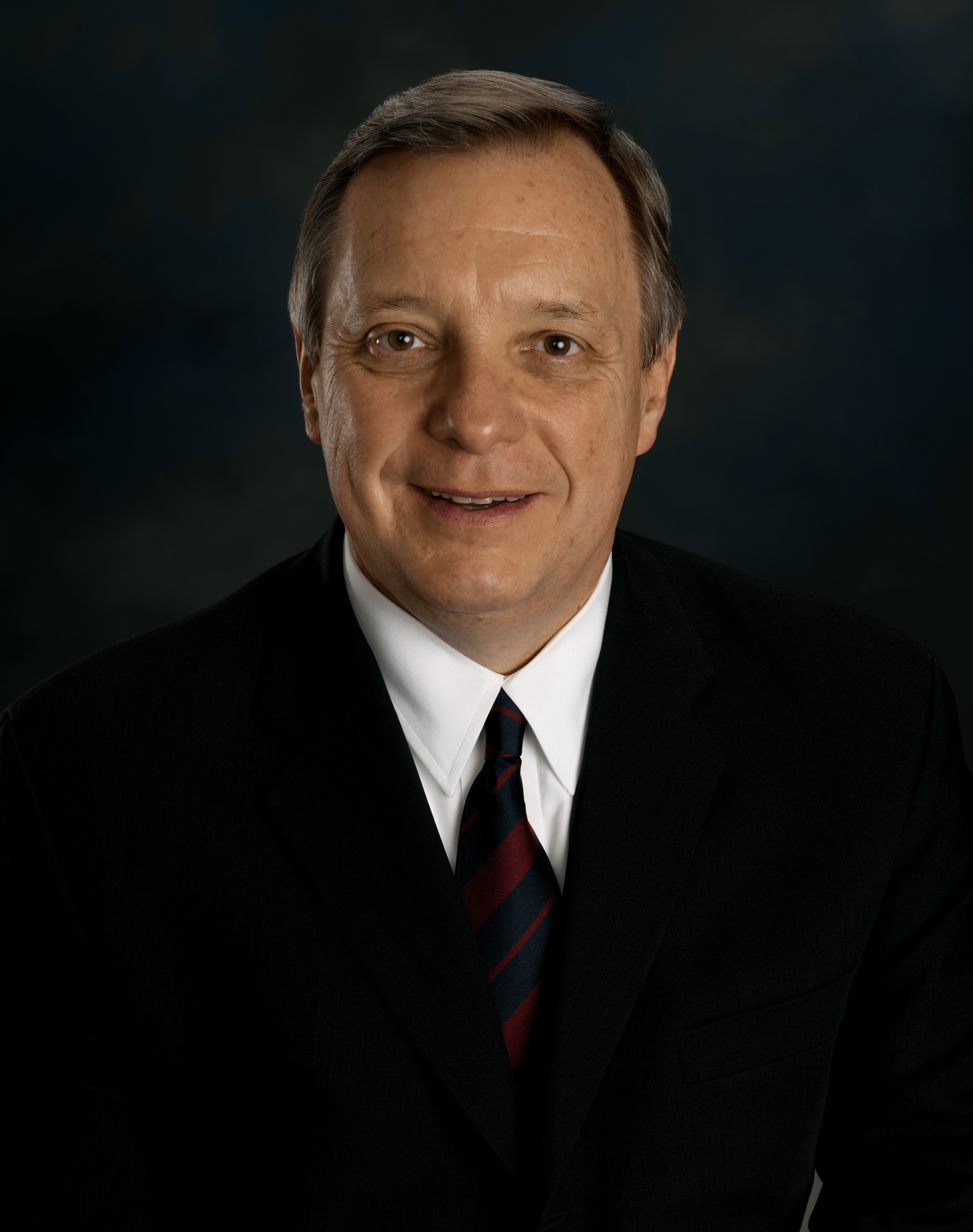
Democratic Whip
Dick Durbin

Senate Minority Leaders

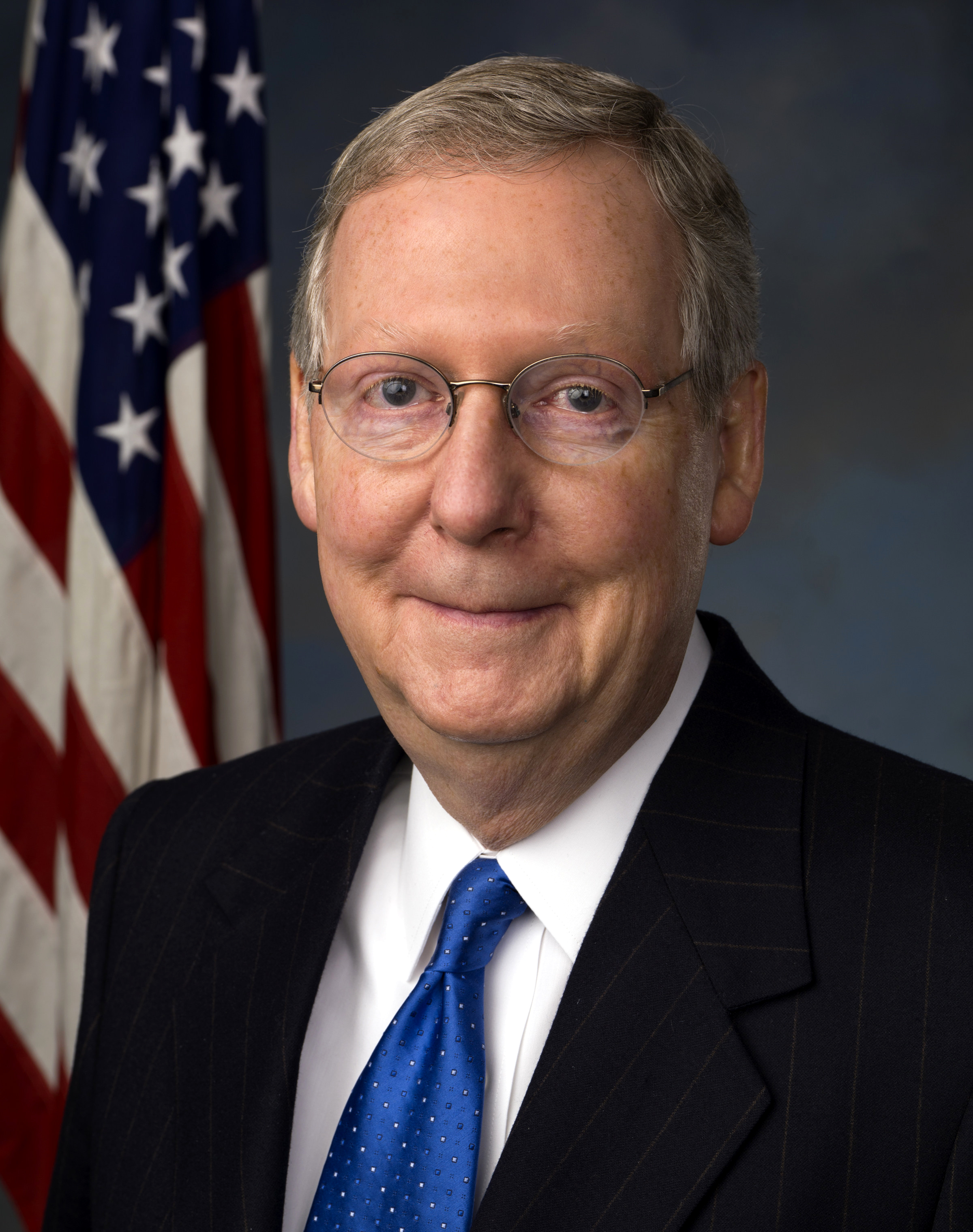
Republican Leader
Mitch McConnell

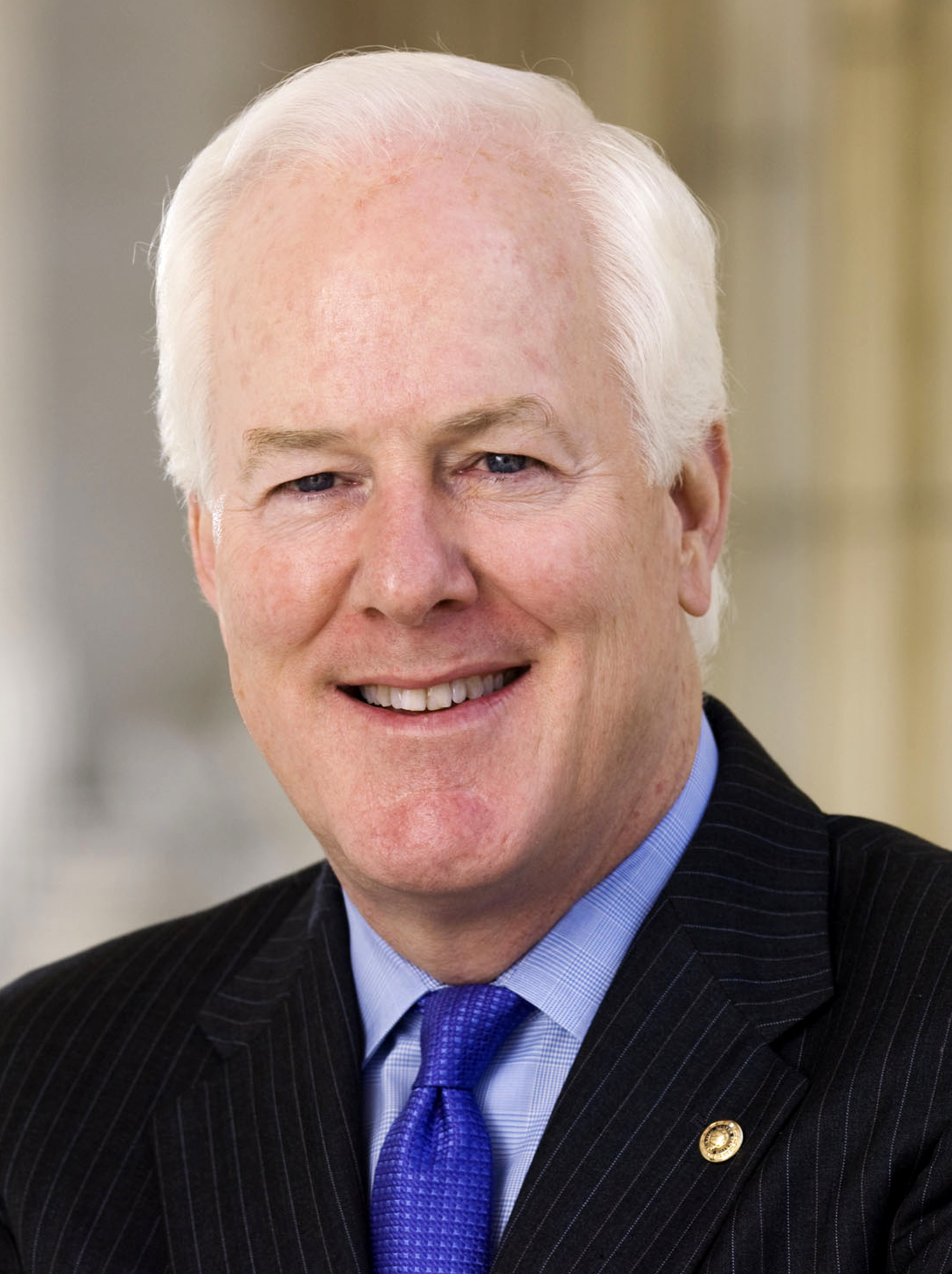
Republican Whip
John Cornyn

=== House of Representatives ===
==== Alabama ====
▌1. Jo Bonner (R), until August 2, 2013

▌Bradley Byrne (R), from January 7, 2014

▌2. Martha Roby (R)
▌3. Mike Rogers (R)
▌4. Robert Aderholt (R)
▌5. Mo Brooks (R)
▌6. Spencer Bachus (R)
▌7. Terri Sewell (D)

==== Alaska ====
▌At-large. Don Young (R)

==== Arizona ====
▌1. Ann Kirkpatrick (D)
▌2. Ron Barber (D)
▌3. Raúl Grijalva (D)
▌4. Paul Gosar (R)
▌5. Matt Salmon (R)
▌6. David Schweikert (R)
▌7. Ed Pastor (D)
▌8. Trent Franks (R)
▌9. Kyrsten Sinema (D)

==== Arkansas ====
▌1. Rick Crawford (R)
▌2. Tim Griffin (R)
▌3. Steve Womack (R)
▌4. Tom Cotton (R)

==== California ====
▌1. Doug LaMalfa (R)
▌2. Jared Huffman (D)
▌3. John Garamendi (D)
▌4. Tom McClintock (R)
▌5. Mike Thompson (D)
▌6. Doris Matsui (D)
▌7. Ami Bera (D)
▌8. Paul Cook (R)
▌9. Jerry McNerney (D)
▌10. Jeff Denham (R)
▌11. George Miller (D)
▌12. Nancy Pelosi (D)
▌13. Barbara Lee (D)
▌14. Jackie Speier (D)
▌15. Eric Swalwell (D)
▌16. Jim Costa (D)
▌17. Mike Honda (D)
▌18. Anna Eshoo (D)
▌19. Zoe Lofgren (D)
▌20. Sam Farr (D)
▌21. David Valadao (R)
▌22. Devin Nunes (R)
▌23. Kevin McCarthy (R)
▌24. Lois Capps (D)
▌25. Buck McKeon (R)
▌26. Julia Brownley (D)
▌27. Judy Chu (D)
▌28. Adam Schiff (D)
▌29. Tony Cardenas (D)
▌30. Brad Sherman (D)
▌31. Gary Miller (R)
▌32. Grace Napolitano (D)
▌33. Henry Waxman (D)
▌34. Xavier Becerra (D)
▌35. Gloria Negrete McLeod (D)
▌36. Raul Ruiz (D)
▌37. Karen Bass (D)
▌38. Linda Sanchez (D)
▌39. Ed Royce (R)
▌40. Lucille Roybal-Allard (D)
▌41. Mark Takano (D)
▌42. Ken Calvert (R)
▌43. Maxine Waters (D)
▌44. Janice Hahn (D)
▌45. John Campbell (R)
▌46. Loretta Sanchez (D)
▌47. Alan Lowenthal (D)
▌48. Dana Rohrabacher (R)
▌49. Darrell Issa (R)
▌50. Duncan D. Hunter (R)
▌51. Juan Vargas (D)
▌52. Scott Peters (D)
▌53. Susan Davis (D)

==== Colorado ====
▌1. Diana DeGette (D)
▌2. Jared Polis (D)
▌3. Scott Tipton (R)
▌4. Cory Gardner (R)
▌5. Doug Lamborn (R)
▌6. Mike Coffman (R)
▌7. Ed Perlmutter (D)

==== Connecticut ====
▌1. John Larson (D)
▌2. Joe Courtney (D)
▌3. Rosa DeLauro (D)
▌4. Jim Himes (D)
▌5. Elizabeth Esty (D)

==== Delaware ====
▌At-large. John Carney (D)

==== Florida ====
▌1. Jeff Miller (R)
▌2. Steve Southerland (R)
▌3. Ted Yoho (R)
▌4. Ander Crenshaw (R)
▌5. Corrine Brown (D)
▌6. Ron DeSantis (R)
▌7. John Mica (R)
▌8. Bill Posey (R)
▌9. Alan Grayson (D)
▌10. Daniel Webster (R)
▌11. Rich Nugent (R)
▌12. Gus Bilirakis (R)
▌13. Bill Young (R), until October 18, 2013

▌David Jolly (R), from March 13, 2014

▌14. Kathy Castor (D)
▌15. Dennis Ross (R)
▌16. Vern Buchanan (R)
▌17. Tom Rooney (R)
▌18. Patrick Murphy (D)
▌19. Trey Radel (R), until January 27, 2014

▌Curt Clawson (R), from June 25, 2014

▌20. Alcee Hastings (D)
▌21. Ted Deutch (D)
▌22. Lois Frankel (D)
▌23. Debbie Wasserman Schultz (D)
▌24. Frederica Wilson (D)
▌25. Mario Diaz-Balart (R)
▌26. Joe Garcia (D)
▌27. Ileana Ros-Lehtinen (R)

==== Georgia ====
▌1. Jack Kingston (R)
▌2. Sanford Bishop (D)
▌3. Lynn Westmoreland (R)
▌4. Hank Johnson (D)
▌5. John Lewis (D)
▌6. Tom Price (R)
▌7. Rob Woodall (R)
▌8. Austin Scott (R)
▌9. Doug Collins (R)
▌10. Paul Broun (R)
▌11. Phil Gingrey (R)
▌12. John Barrow (D)
▌13. David Scott (D)
▌14. Tom Graves (R)

==== Hawaii ====
▌1. Colleen Hanabusa (D)
▌2. Tulsi Gabbard (D)

==== Idaho ====
▌1. Raul Labrador (R)
▌2. Mike Simpson (R)

==== Illinois ====
▌1. Bobby Rush (D)
▌2. Robin Kelly (D), from April 9, 2013
▌3. Dan Lipinski (D)
▌4. Luis Gutiérrez (D)
▌5. Mike Quigley (D)
▌6. Peter Roskam (R)
▌7. Danny K. Davis (D)
▌8. Tammy Duckworth (D)
▌9. Jan Schakowsky (D)
▌10. Brad Schneider (D)
▌11. Bill Foster (D)
▌12. William Enyart (D)
▌13. Rodney L. Davis (R)
▌14. Randy Hultgren (R)
▌15. John Shimkus (R)
▌16. Adam Kinzinger (R)
▌17. Cheri Bustos (D)
▌18. Aaron Schock (R)

==== Indiana ====
▌1. Pete Visclosky (D)
▌2. Jackie Walorski (R)
▌3. Marlin Stutzman (R)
▌4. Todd Rokita (R)
▌5. Susan Brooks (R)
▌6. Luke Messer (R)
▌7. André Carson (D)
▌8. Larry Bucshon (R)
▌9. Todd Young (R)

==== Iowa ====
▌1. Bruce Braley (D)
▌2. David Loebsack (D)
▌3. Tom Latham (R)
▌4. Steve King (R)

==== Kansas ====
▌1. Tim Huelskamp (R)
▌2. Lynn Jenkins (R)
▌3. Kevin Yoder (R)
▌4. Mike Pompeo (R)

==== Kentucky ====
▌1. Ed Whitfield (R)
▌2. Brett Guthrie (R)
▌3. John Yarmuth (D)
▌4. Thomas Massie (R)
▌5. Hal Rogers (R)
▌6. Andy Barr (R)

==== Louisiana ====
▌1. Steve Scalise (R)
▌2. Cedric Richmond (D)
▌3. Charles Boustany (R)
▌4. John Fleming (R)
▌5. Rodney Alexander (R), until September 26, 2013

▌Vance McAllister (R), from November 21, 2013

▌6. Bill Cassidy (R)

==== Maine ====
▌1. Chellie Pingree (D)
▌2. Mike Michaud (D)

==== Maryland ====
▌1. Andrew Harris (R)
▌2. Dutch Ruppersberger (D)
▌3. John Sarbanes (D)
▌4. Donna Edwards (D)
▌5. Steny Hoyer (D)
▌6. John Delaney (D)
▌7. Elijah Cummings (D)
▌8. Chris Van Hollen (D)

==== Massachusetts ====
▌1. Richard Neal (D)
▌2. Jim McGovern (D)
▌3. Niki Tsongas (D)
▌4. Joseph P. Kennedy III (D)
▌5. Ed Markey (D), until July 15, 2013

▌Katherine Clark (D), from December 12, 2013

▌6. John Tierney (D)
▌7. Mike Capuano (D)
▌8. Stephen Lynch (D)
▌9. Bill Keating (D)

==== Michigan ====
▌1. Dan Benishek (R)
▌2. Bill Huizenga (R)
▌3. Justin Amash (R)
▌4. Dave Camp (R)
▌5. Dan Kildee (D)
▌6. Fred Upton (R)
▌7. Tim Walberg (R)
▌8. Mike Rogers (R)
▌9. Sander Levin (D)
▌10. Candice Miller (R)
▌11. Kerry Bentivolio (R)
▌12. John Dingell (D)
▌13. John Conyers (D)
▌14. Gary Peters (D)

==== Minnesota ====
▌1. Tim Walz (DFL)
▌2. John Kline (R)
▌3. Erik Paulsen (R)
▌4. Betty McCollum (DFL)
▌5. Keith Ellison (DFL)
▌6. Michele Bachmann (R)
▌7. Collin Peterson (DFL)
▌8. Rick Nolan (DFL)

==== Mississippi ====
▌1. Alan Nunnelee (R)
▌2. Bennie Thompson (D)
▌3. Gregg Harper (R)
▌4. Steven Palazzo (R)

==== Missouri ====
▌1. Lacy Clay (D)
▌2. Ann Wagner (R)
▌3. Blaine Luetkemeyer (R)
▌4. Vicky Hartzler (R)
▌5. Emanuel Cleaver (D)
▌6. Sam Graves (R)
▌7. Billy Long (R)
▌8. Jo Ann Emerson (R), until January 22, 2013

▌Jason T. Smith (R), from June 4, 2013

==== Montana ====
▌At-large. Steve Daines (R)

==== Nebraska ====
▌1. Jeff Fortenberry (R)
▌2. Lee Terry (R)
▌3. Adrian M. Smith (R)

==== Nevada ====
▌1. Dina Titus (D)
▌2. Mark Amodei (R)
▌3. Joe Heck (R)
▌4. Steven Horsford (D)

==== New Hampshire ====
▌1. Carol Shea-Porter (D)
▌2. Annie Kuster (D)

==== New Jersey ====
▌1. Rob Andrews (D) until February 18, 2014

▌Donald Norcross (D), from November 12, 2014

▌2. Frank LoBiondo (R)
▌3. Jon Runyan (R)
▌4. Chris Smith (R)
▌5. Scott Garrett (R)
▌6. Frank Pallone (D)
▌7. Leonard Lance (R)
▌8. Albio Sires (D)
▌9. Bill Pascrell (D)
▌10. Donald Payne Jr. (D)
▌11. Rodney Frelinghuysen (R)
▌12. Rush Holt Jr. (D)

==== New Mexico ====
▌1. Michelle Lujan Grisham (D)
▌2. Steve Pearce (R)
▌3. Ben Ray Luján (D)

==== New York ====
▌1. Tim Bishop (D)
▌2. Peter King (R)
▌3. Steve Israel (D)
▌4. Carolyn McCarthy (D)
▌5. Gregory Meeks (D)
▌6. Grace Meng (D)
▌7. Nydia Velázquez (D)
▌8. Hakeem Jeffries (D)
▌9. Yvette Clarke (D)
▌10. Jerry Nadler (D)
▌11. Michael Grimm (R)
▌12. Carolyn Maloney (D)
▌13. Charles Rangel (D)
▌14. Joe Crowley (D)
▌15. Jose E. Serrano (D)
▌16. Eliot Engel (D)
▌17. Nita Lowey (D)
▌18. Sean Patrick Maloney (D)
▌19. Chris Gibson (R)
▌20. Paul Tonko (D)
▌21. Bill Owens (D)
▌22. Richard Hanna (R)
▌23. Thomas Reed (R)
▌24. Daniel Maffei (D)
▌25. Louise Slaughter (D)
▌26. Brian Higgins (D)
▌27. Chris Collins (R)

==== North Carolina ====
▌1. G. K. Butterfield (D)
▌2. Renee Ellmers (R)
▌3. Walter B. Jones Jr. (R)
▌4. David Price (D)
▌5. Virginia Foxx (R)
▌6. Howard Coble (R)
▌7. Mike McIntyre (D)
▌8. Richard Hudson (R)
▌9. Robert Pittenger (R)
▌10. Patrick McHenry (R)
▌11. Mark Meadows (R)
▌12. Mel Watt (D), until January 6, 2014

▌Alma Adams (D), from November 12, 2014

▌13. George Holding (R)

==== North Dakota ====
▌At-large. Kevin Cramer (R)

==== Ohio ====
▌1. Steve Chabot (R)
▌2. Brad Wenstrup (R)
▌3. Joyce Beatty (D)
▌4. Jim Jordan (R)
▌5. Bob Latta (R)
▌6. Bill Johnson (R)
▌7. Bob Gibbs (R)
▌8. John Boehner (R)
▌9. Marcy Kaptur (D)
▌10. Mike Turner (R)
▌11. Marcia Fudge (D)
▌12. Pat Tiberi (R)
▌13. Tim Ryan (D)
▌14. David Joyce (R)
▌15. Steve Stivers (R)
▌16. Jim Renacci (R)

==== Oklahoma ====
▌1. Jim Bridenstine (R)
▌2. Markwayne Mullin (R)
▌3. Frank Lucas (R)
▌4. Tom Cole (R)
▌5. James Lankford (R)

==== Oregon ====
▌1. Suzanne Bonamici (D)
▌2. Greg Walden (R)
▌3. Earl Blumenauer (D)
▌4. Peter DeFazio (D)
▌5. Kurt Schrader (D)

==== Pennsylvania ====
▌1. Bob Brady (D)
▌2. Chaka Fattah (D)
▌3. Mike Kelly (R)
▌4. Scott Perry (R)
▌5. Glenn Thompson (R)
▌6. Jim Gerlach (R)
▌7. Pat Meehan (R)
▌8. Mike Fitzpatrick (R)
▌9. Bill Shuster (R)
▌10. Tom Marino (R)
▌11. Lou Barletta (R)
▌12. Keith Rothfus (R)
▌13. Allyson Schwartz (D)
▌14. Mike Doyle (D)
▌15. Charlie Dent (R)
▌16. Joe Pitts (R)
▌17. Matt Cartwright (D)
▌18. Tim Murphy (R)

==== Rhode Island ====
▌1. David Cicilline (D)
▌2. James Langevin (D)

==== South Carolina ====
▌1. Mark Sanford (R), from May 7, 2013
▌2. Joe Wilson (R)
▌3. Jeff Duncan (R)
▌4. Trey Gowdy (R)
▌5. Mick Mulvaney (R)
▌6. Jim Clyburn (D)
▌7. Tom Rice (R)

==== South Dakota ====
▌At-large. Kristi Noem (R)

==== Tennessee ====
▌1. Phil Roe (R)
▌2. Jimmy Duncan (R)
▌3. Chuck Fleischmann (R)
▌4. Scott DesJarlais (R)
▌5. Jim Cooper (D)
▌6. Diane Black (R)
▌7. Marsha Blackburn (R)
▌8. Stephen Fincher (R)
▌9. Steve Cohen (D)

==== Texas ====
▌1. Louie Gohmert (R)
▌2. Ted Poe (R)
▌3. Sam Johnson (R)
▌4. Ralph Hall (R)
▌5. Jeb Hensarling (R)
▌6. Joe Barton (R)
▌7. John Culberson (R)
▌8. Kevin Brady (R)
▌9. Al Green (D)
▌10. Michael McCaul (R)
▌11. Mike Conaway (R)
▌12. Kay Granger (R)
▌13. Mac Thornberry (R)
▌14. Randy Weber (R)
▌15. Ruben Hinojosa (D)
▌16. Beto O'Rourke (D)
▌17. Bill Flores (R)
▌18. Sheila Jackson Lee (D)
▌19. Randy Neugebauer (R)
▌20. Joaquin Castro (D)
▌21. Lamar S. Smith (R)
▌22. Pete Olson (R)
▌23. Pete Gallego (D)
▌24. Kenny Marchant (R)
▌25. Roger Williams (R)
▌26. Michael C. Burgess (R)
▌27. Blake Farenthold (R)
▌28. Henry Cuellar (D)
▌29. Gene Green (D)
▌30. Eddie Bernice Johnson (D)
▌31. John Carter (R)
▌32. Pete Sessions (R)
▌33. Marc Veasey (D)
▌34. Filemon Vela (D)
▌35. Lloyd Doggett (D)
▌36. Steve Stockman (R)

==== Utah ====
▌1. Rob Bishop (R)
▌2. Chris Stewart (R)
▌3. Jason Chaffetz (R)
▌4. Jim Matheson (D)

==== Vermont ====
▌At-large. Peter Welch (D)

==== Virginia ====
▌1. Rob Wittman (R)
▌2. Scott Rigell (R)
▌3. Bobby Scott (D)
▌4. Randy Forbes (R)
▌5. Robert Hurt (R)
▌6. Bob Goodlatte (R)
▌7. Eric Cantor (R), until August 18, 2014

▌Dave Brat (R), from November 12, 2014

▌8. Jim Moran (D)
▌9. Morgan Griffith (R)
▌10. Frank Wolf (R)
▌11. Gerry Connolly (D)

==== Washington ====
▌1. Suzan DelBene (D)
▌2. Rick Larsen (D)
▌3. Jaime Herrera Beutler (R)
▌4. Doc Hastings (R)
▌5. Cathy McMorris Rodgers (R)
▌6. Derek Kilmer (D)
▌7. Jim McDermott (D)
▌8. Dave Reichert (R)
▌9. Adam Smith (D)
▌10. Dennis Heck (D)

==== West Virginia ====
▌1. David McKinley (R)
▌2. Shelley Moore Capito (R)
▌3. Nick Rahall (D)

==== Wisconsin ====
▌1. Paul Ryan (R)
▌2. Mark Pocan (D)
▌3. Ron Kind (D)
▌4. Gwen Moore (D)
▌5. Jim Sensenbrenner (R)
▌6. Tom Petri (R)
▌7. Sean Duffy (R)
▌8. Reid Ribble (R)

==== Wyoming ====
▌At-large. Cynthia Lummis (R)

==== Non-voting members ====
▌American Samoa. Eni Faleomavaega (D)
▌District of Columbia. Eleanor Holmes Norton (D)
▌Guam. Madeleine Z. Bordallo (D)
▌Northern Mariana Islands. Gregorio Sablan (D)
▌Puerto Rico. Pedro Pierluisi (Resident Commissioner) (D/PNP)
▌Virgin Islands. Donna Christian-Christensen (D)

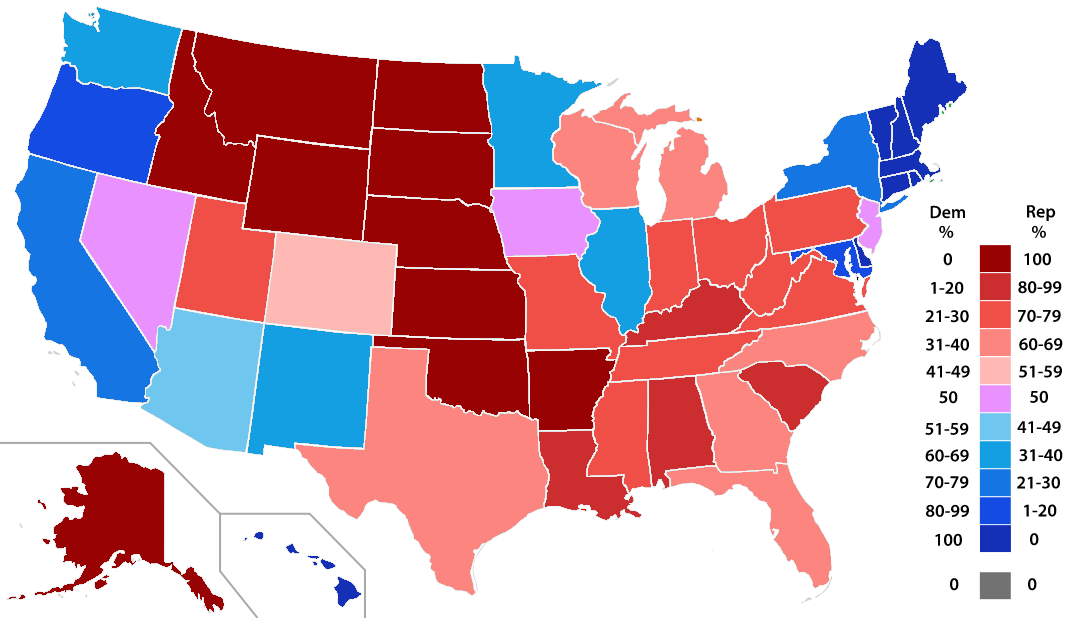
Percentage of members from each party by state, ranging from dark blue (most Democratic) to dark red (most Republican).

Party membership of the House, by district Democratic Republican

House Majority Leaders

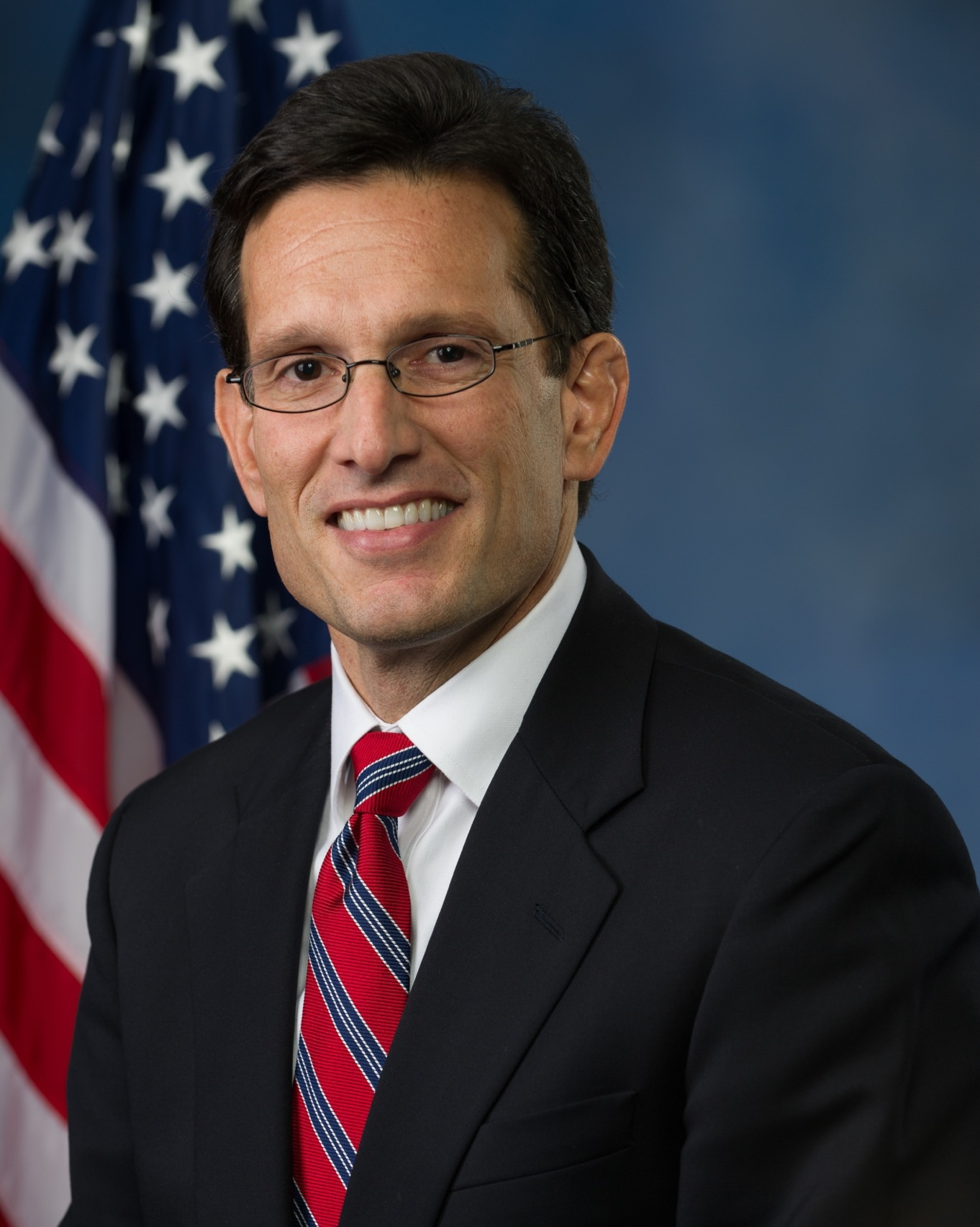
Republican Leader
(until July 31, 2014)
Eric Cantor

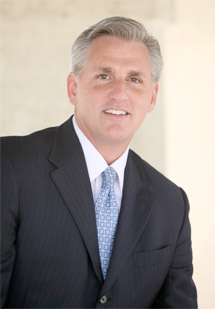
Republican Whip
(until July 31, 2014)
Republican Leader
(from August 1, 2014)
Kevin McCarthy

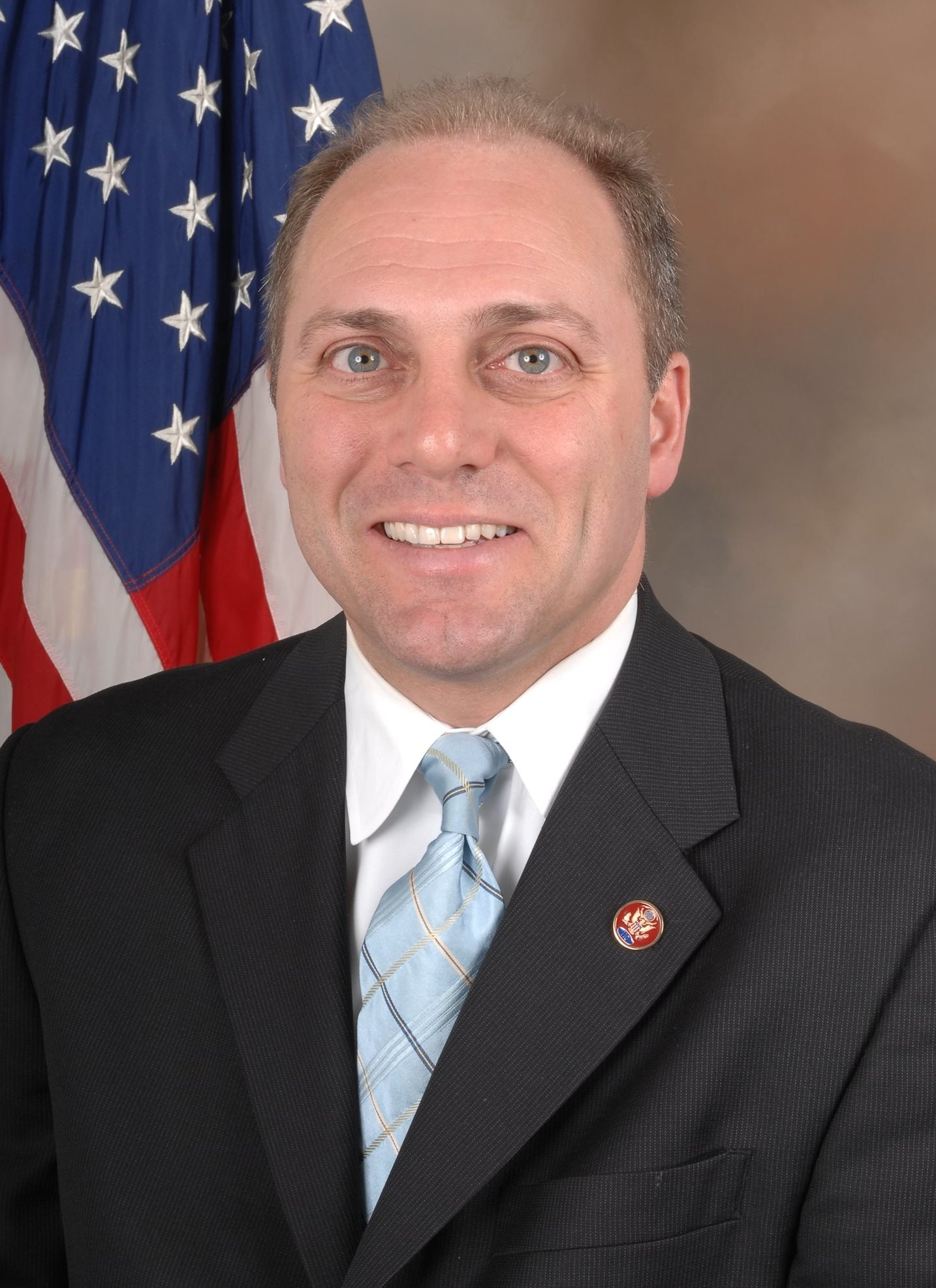
Republican Whip
(from August 1, 2014)
Steve Scalise

House Minority Leaders

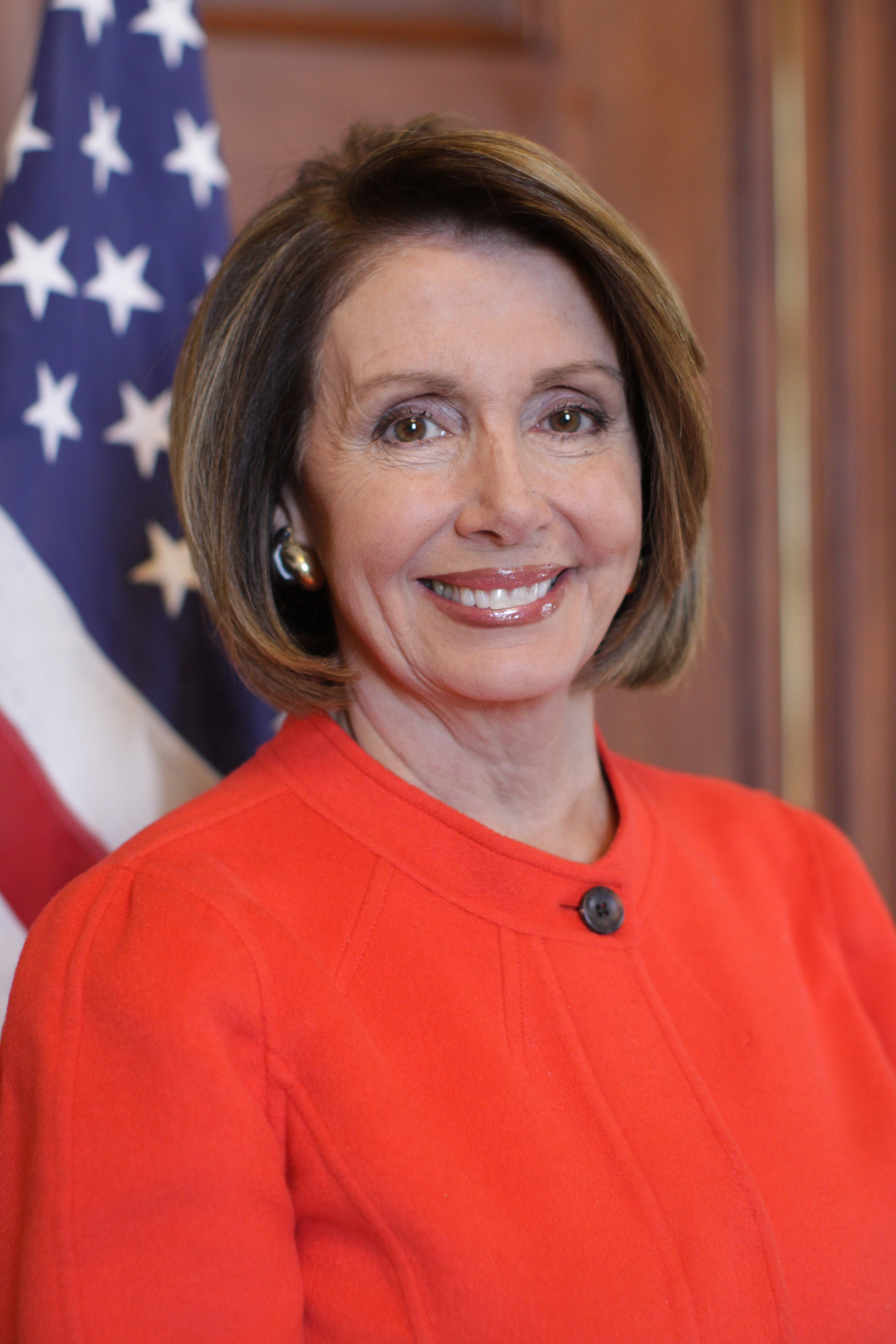
Democratic Leader
Nancy Pelosi

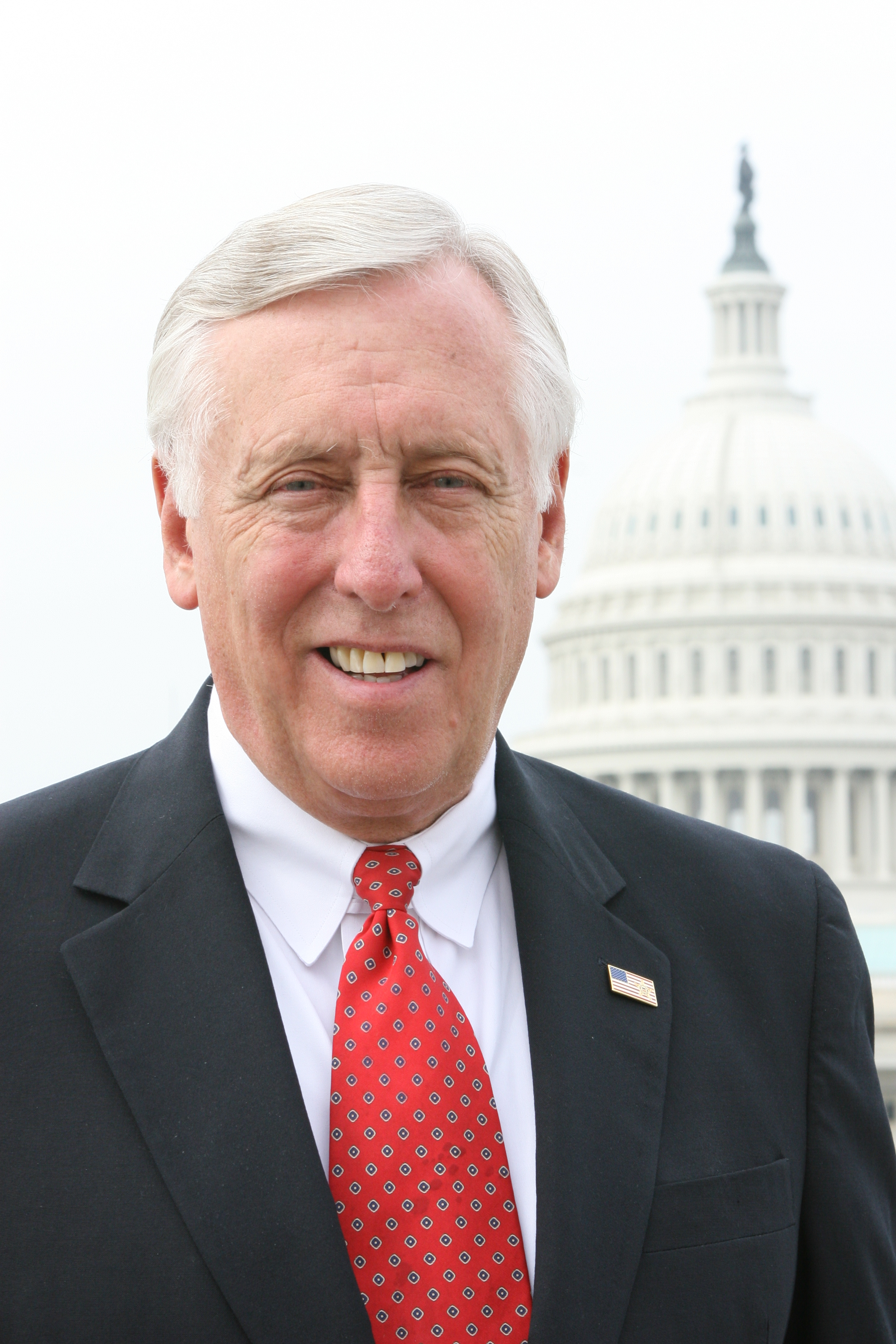
Democratic Whip
Steny Hoyer

== Changes in membership ==
=== Senate ===
Senate changes
State (class)	Vacated by	Reason for change	Successor	Date of successor's formal installation (Note: When seated or oath administered, not necessarily when service began.)
Massachusetts (2)	John Kerry (D)	Incumbent resigned February 1, 2013, to become U.S. Secretary of State. Successor was appointed February 1, 2013, to continue the term.	Mo Cowan (D)	February 1, 2013
New Jersey (2)	Frank Lautenberg (D)	Incumbent died June 3, 2013. Successor was appointed June 6, 2013, to continue the term.	Jeffrey Chiesa (R)	June 10, 2013
Massachusetts (2)	Mo Cowan (D)	Appointee resigned July 16, 2013, following a special election. Successor was elected June 25, 2013, to finish the term.	Ed Markey (D)	July 16, 2013
New Jersey (2)	Jeffrey Chiesa (R)	Appointee resigned October 31, 2013, following a special election. Successor was elected October 16, 2013, to finish the term.	Cory Booker (D)	October 31, 2013
Montana (2)	Max Baucus (D)	Incumbent resigned February 6, 2014, to become U.S. Ambassador to China, having already planned to retire at the end of the term. Successor was appointed February 9, 2014, to finish the term.	John Walsh (D)	February 11, 2014

=== House of Representatives ===
House changes
District	Vacated by	Reason for change	Successor	Date of successor's formal installation
Illinois 2	Vacant	Jesse Jackson Jr. (D) resigned November 21, 2012, near the end of the previous Congress for health reasons, and declined to take office after being re-elected. A special election was held April 9, 2013.	Robin Kelly (D)	April 11, 2013
South Carolina 1	Vacant	Tim Scott (R) resigned January 2, 2013, near the end of the previous Congress, when appointed to the Senate. A special election was held May 7, 2013.	Mark Sanford (R)	May 15, 2013
Missouri 8	Jo Ann Emerson (R)	Incumbent resigned January 22, 2013, to become president and CEO of the National Rural Electric Cooperative Association. A special election was held June 4, 2013.	Jason Smith (R)	June 5, 2013
Massachusetts 5	Ed Markey (D)	Incumbent resigned July 16, 2013, having been elected to the United States Senate in a special election. A special election was held December 10, 2013.	Katherine Clark (D)	December 12, 2013
Alabama 1	Jo Bonner (R)	Incumbent resigned August 2, 2013, to become a vice chancellor in the University of Alabama System. A special election was held December 17, 2013.	Bradley Byrne (R)	January 7, 2014
Louisiana 5	Rodney Alexander (R)	Incumbent resigned September 26, 2013, to become the secretary of the Louisiana Department of Veterans Affairs. A special election was held November 16, 2013.	Vance McAllister (R)	November 21, 2013
Florida 13	Bill Young (R)	Incumbent died October 18, 2013. A special election was held March 11, 2014.	David Jolly (R)	March 13, 2014
North Carolina 12	Mel Watt (D)	Incumbent resigned January 6, 2014, to become head of the Federal Housing Finance Agency. A special election was held November 4, 2014.	Alma Adams (D)	November 12, 2014
Florida 19	Trey Radel (R)	Incumbent resigned January 27, 2014 following a conviction for cocaine possession. A special election was held June 24, 2014.	Curt Clawson (R)	June 25, 2014
New Jersey 1	Rob Andrews (D)	Incumbent resigned February 18, 2014, to take a position at a Philadelphia law firm. A special election was held November 4, 2014.	Donald Norcross (D)	November 12, 2014
Virginia 7	Eric Cantor (R)	Incumbent resigned August 18, 2014 following his primary defeat. A special election was held November 4, 2014.	Dave Brat (R)	November 12, 2014

== Committees ==
[Section contents: Senate, House, Joint ] Listed alphabetically by chamber, including Chairperson and Ranking Member.

=== Senate ===
Committee	Chairman	Ranking Member
Aging (special)	Bill Nelson (D-FL)	Susan Collins (R-ME)
Agriculture, Nutrition and Forestry	Debbie Stabenow (D-MI)	Thad Cochran (R-MS)
Appropriations	Barbara Mikulski (D-MD)	Richard Shelby (R-AL)
Armed Services	Carl Levin (D-MI)	Jim Inhofe (R-OK)
Banking, Housing and Urban Affairs	Tim Johnson (D-SD)	Mike Crapo (R-ID)
Budget	Patty Murray (D-WA)	Jeff Sessions (R-AL)
Commerce, Science and Transportation	Jay Rockefeller (D-WV)	John Thune (R-SD)
Energy and Natural Resources	Ron Wyden (D-OR) until Feb 2014	Lisa Murkowski (R-AK)
Energy and Natural Resources	Mary Landrieu (D-LA) from Feb 2014	Lisa Murkowski (R-AK)
Environment and Public Works	Barbara Boxer (D-CA)	David Vitter (R-LA)
Ethics (select)	Barbara Boxer (D-CA)	Johnny Isakson (R-GA)
Finance	Max Baucus (D-MT) until Feb 2014	Orrin Hatch (R-UT)
Finance	Ron Wyden (D-OR) from Feb 2014	Orrin Hatch (R-UT)
Foreign Relations	John Kerry (D-MA) until Feb 2013	Bob Corker (R-TN)
Foreign Relations	Bob Menendez (D-NJ) from Feb 2013	Bob Corker (R-TN)
Health, Education, Labor and Pensions	Tom Harkin (D-IA)	Lamar Alexander (R-TN)
Homeland Security and Governmental Affairs	Thomas Carper (D-DE)	Tom Coburn (R-OK)
Indian Affairs	Maria Cantwell (D-WA) until Feb 2014	John Barrasso (R-WY)
Indian Affairs	Jon Tester (D-MT) from Feb 2014	John Barrasso (R-WY)
Intelligence (Select)	Dianne Feinstein (D-CA)	Saxby Chambliss (R-GA)
Judiciary	Patrick Leahy (D-VT)	Chuck Grassley (R-IA)
Rules and Administration	Chuck Schumer (D-NY)	Pat Roberts (R-KS)
Small Business and Entrepreneurship	Mary Landrieu (D-LA) until Feb 2014	Jim Risch (R-ID)
Small Business and Entrepreneurship	Maria Cantwell (D-WA) from Feb 2014	Jim Risch (R-ID)
Veterans' Affairs	Bernie Sanders (I-VT)	Richard Burr (R-NC)

=== House of Representatives ===
Sources: H.Res. 6, H.Res. 7

Committee	Chairman	Ranking Member
Agriculture	Frank Lucas (R-OK)	Collin Peterson (D-MN)
Appropriations	Harold Rogers (R-KY)	Nita Lowey (D-NY)
Armed Services	Buck McKeon (R-CA)	Adam Smith (D-WA)
Budget	Paul Ryan (R-WI)	Chris Van Hollen (D-MD)
Education and the Workforce	John Kline (R-MN)	George Miller (D-CA)
Energy and Commerce	Fred Upton (R-MI)	Henry Waxman (D-CA)
Ethics	Mike Conaway (R-TX)	Linda Sánchez (D-CA)
Financial Services	Jeb Hensarling (R-TX)	Maxine Waters (D-CA)
Foreign Affairs	Edward Royce (R-CA)	Eliot Engel (D-NY)
Homeland Security	Michael McCaul (R-TX)	Bennie Thompson (D-MS)
House Administration	Candice Miller (R-MI)	Robert Brady (D-PA)
Judiciary	Bob Goodlatte (R-VA)	John Conyers (D-MI)
Natural Resources	Doc Hastings (R-WA)	Ed Markey (D-MA) until July 2013 Peter DeFazio (D-OR) from July 2013
Oversight and Government Reform	Darrell Issa (R-CA)	Elijah Cummings (D-MD)
Rules	Pete Sessions (R-TX)	Louise Slaughter (D-NY)
Science, Space & Technology	Lamar Smith (R-TX)	Eddie Bernice Johnson (D-TX)
Small Business	Sam Graves (R-MO)	Nydia Velázquez (D-NY)
Transportation and Infrastructure	Bill Shuster (R-PA)	Nick Rahall (D-WV)
Veterans' Affairs	Jeff Miller (R-FL)	Mike Michaud (D-ME)
Ways and Means	Dave Camp (R-MI)	Sander Levin (D-MI)
Permanent Select Committee on Intelligence	Mike Rogers (R-MI)	Dutch Ruppersberger (D-MD)

=== Joint committees ===
- Economic: Kevin Brady, Amy Klobuchar
- Inaugural Ceremonies (Special): Chuck Schumer, Lamar Alexander
- The Library: Gregg Harper, Chuck Schumer
- Printing: Chuck Schumer, Gregg Harper
- Taxation: Max Baucus, then Ron Wyden, Dave Camp

== Employees ==
=== Legislative branch agency directors ===
- Architect of the Capitol: Stephen T. Ayers
- Attending Physician of the United States Congress: Brian Monahan
- Comptroller General of the United States: Eugene Louis Dodaro
- Director of the Congressional Budget Office: Keith Hall
- Librarian of Congress: James H. Billington
- Public Printer of the United States: Davita E. Vance-Cooks

=== Senate ===
- Chaplain: Barry C. Black (Seventh-day Adventist)
- Curator: Diane K. Skvarla, until January 27, 2014
  - Melinda Smith, starting January 27, 2014
- Historian: Donald A. Ritchie
- Librarian: Leona I. Faust
- Parliamentarian: Elizabeth MacDonough
- Secretary: Nancy Erickson
- Secretary for the Majority: Gary B. Myrick
- Secretary for the Minority: David J. Schiappa, until August 1, 2013
  - Laura C. Dove, from August 1, 2013
- Sergeant at Arms: Terrance W. Gainer, until May 2, 2014
  - Andrew B. Willison, from May 2, 2014

=== House of Representatives ===
- Chaplain: Patrick J. Conroy (Roman Catholic)
- Chief Administrative Officer: Daniel J. Strodel, until January 6, 2014
  - Ed Cassidy, from January 6, 2014
- Clerk: Karen L. Haas
- Historian: Matthew Wasniewski
- Inspector General: Theresa M. Grafenstine
- Parliamentarian: Thomas J. Wickham Jr.
- Reading Clerks: Susan Cole (R) and Joseph Novotny (D)
- Sergeant at Arms: Paul D. Irving

== See also ==
=== Elections ===
- 2012 United States elections (elections leading to this Congress)
  - 2012 United States presidential election
  - 2012 United States Senate elections
  - 2012 United States House of Representatives elections
- 2014 United States elections (elections during this Congress, leading to the next Congress)
  - 2014 United States Senate elections
  - 2014 United States House of Representatives elections

=== Membership lists ===
- List of new members of the 113th United States Congress
