= Bipartisan Student Loan Certainty Act of 2013 =

Bipartisan Student Loan Certainty Act of 2013; Smarter Solutions for Students Act
- Long title: To amend the Higher Education Act of 1965 to establish interest rates for new loans made on or after July 1, 2013.
- Announced in: the 113th United States Congress
- Sponsored by: Rep. John Kline (R, MN-2)

Codification
- Acts affected: Higher Education Act of 1965
- U.S.C. sections affected: 20 U.S.C. § 1087e(b)

[H.R. 1911 Legislative history]
- Introduced in the House as H.R. 1911 by John Kline (R–MN) on May 9, 2013; Committee consideration by United States House Committee on Education and the Workforce, United States House Committee on the Budget, Passed the House on May 23, 2013 (Roll Call Vote 183: 221-198); Passed the Senate as the Bipartisan Student Loan Certainty Act of 2013 on July 24, 2013 (81-18); Agreed to by the House on July 31, 2013 (392-31); Signed into law by President Barack Obama on August 9, 2013

The Bipartisan Student Loan Certainty Act of 2013 was a bill signed into law by President Barack Obama on August 9, 2013, which, after more than a month of contentious debate between both parties about higher education and how the government should distribute loans, sets federal student loan rates to financial markets on all DIRECT student loans disbursed on or after July 1, 2013. There are maximum rate caps for Undergrad, Graduate PLUS and Parent PLUS loans. Democrats had originally planned to extend the low 3.4% rate for another 1–2 years but the bill, sponsored by Sen. Jack Reed (D-RI), was filibustered. Republicans in the House created a market-based approach, and the two sides eventually reconciled, after Sen. Joe Manchin (D-WV) and Sen. Angus King (I-ME) broke away from the Democratic Caucus to side up with the Republican bill, to prevent undesired gridlock.
