= Freedom to Fish Act =

- Long title: To prohibit the Corps of Engineers from taking certain actions to establish a restricted area prohibiting public access to waters downstream of a dam, and for other purposes.
- Announced in: the 113th United States Congress
- Sponsored by: Senator Lamar Alexander (R-TN)
- Number of co-sponsors: 0

Codification
- Acts affected: Flood Control Act of 1944
- U.S.C. sections affected: 16 U.S.C. § 460d
- Agencies affected: United States Department of the Army

[S. 982 Legislative history]
- Introduced in the Senate as S. 982 by Lamar Alexander (R-TN) on May 16, 2013; Passed the Senate on May 16, 2013 (Unanimous consent); Passed the House on May 21, 2013 (Voice vote); Signed into law by President Barack Obama on June 3, 2013

The Freedom to Fish Act (Pub. L. 113–13 (text) (PDF); S. 982) is a law that creates a two-year moratorium on plans by the Chief of the Army Corps of Engineers to restrict access of the general public to the tailwaters along the Cumberland River, primarily located in Kentucky and Tennessee. The tailwater of a river is the area immediately following a dam-like structure where there is better fishing than elsewhere on the river. The Army Corps of Engineers announced that they would be restricting access to these areas in 2012 for reasons of safety.

The bill passed during the 113th United States Congress and was signed into law on June 3, 2013.

== Provisions/elements of the bill ==
This summary is based largely on the summary provided by the Congressional Research Service, a public domain source.

The Freedom to Fish Act requires the Chief of the United States Army Corps of Engineers to: (1) cease implementing and enforcing, until two years after enactment of the Act, any restricted area for hazardous waters at dams and other civil works structures in the Cumberland River Basin that the Chief established or modified between August 1, 2012, and the day before the enactment of this Act; and (2) remove any permanent physical barriers constructed in connection with such area.

The Freedom to Fish Act also requires the Chief, before establishing any such restricted area after the Act's enactment, to: (1) ensure that any restrictions are based on operational conditions that create hazardous waters, and (2) publish and seek and consider public comment on a draft describing the restricted area. The Act prohibits the Chief from: (1) implementing or enforcing the restricted area until two years after this Act's enactment, or (2) taking any action to establish a permanent physical barrier in connection with such area. (Excludes the installation and maintenance of measures for alerting the public of hazardous water conditions as such a permanent physical barrier.)

It also makes enforcement of a restricted area the sole responsibility of the state in which such area is located. Finally, it prohibits the Chief from assessing any penalty for entering a restricted area of public park and recreational facilities at water resource development projects.

== Procedural history ==
=== Senate ===
The Freedom to Fish Act (S. 982) was introduced into the United States Senate by Senator Lamar Alexander (R-TN) on May 16, 2013. It passed the Senate later that day by unanimous consent.

=== House ===
The Freedom to Fish Act was received in the United States House of Representatives on May 20, 2013. It passed by voice vote on May 21, 2013.

=== Presidential action ===
The Freedom to Fish Act was presented to the President of the United States Barack Obama on May 22, 2013. He signed it into law on June 3, 2013.

== Debate and discussion ==
The bill received the support of Senators Rand Paul, Mitch McConnell, Lamar Alexander, and Bob Corker, the four Senators from the states affected : Tennessee and Kentucky. In a statement, Senator Paul indicated that he was in favor of the legislation because it protected the "livelihoods of many business owners and fishermen" and prevented "the bureaucratic overreach of the Army Corps".

In a press release, Representative Ed Whitfield from Kentucky explained his involvement in getting the legislation passed, detailing meetings he attended with members of the Army Corps of Engineers and compromises he attempted to get them to allow for more public comment on their decision to block off the tailwaters.

== See also ==
- List of bills in the 113th United States Congress
