= Support for United States-Republic of Korea Civil Nuclear Cooperation Act =

2014 U.S. bill

- Long title: To authorize the President to extend the term of the nuclear energy agreement with the Republic of Korea until March 19, 2016.
- Announced in: the 113th United States Congress
- Sponsored by: Sen. Robert Menendez (D, NJ)
- Number of co-sponsors: 1

Codification
- Acts affected: Atomic Energy Act of 1954
- U.S.C. sections affected: 42 U.S.C. § 2153
- Agencies affected: United States Congress, Executive Office of the President

Legislative history
- Introduced in the Senate as S. 1901 by Sen. Robert Menendez (D, NJ) on January 9, 2014; Committee consideration by United States Senate Committee on Foreign Relations; Passed the Senate on January 27, 2014 (unanimous consent); Passed the House on January 28, 2014 (voice vote)

The Support for United States-Republic of Korea Civil Nuclear Cooperation Act (S. 1901) is a bill that would authorize the President of the United States to extend the term of the Agreement for Cooperation between the Government of the United States of America and the Government of the Republic of Korea Concerning Civil Uses of Atomic Energy to a date no later than March 19, 2016. The extended agreement would allow the United States and South Korea to continue working on joint nuclear power projects.

The bill passed both the House and the Senate during the 113th United States Congress.

== Provisions of the bill ==
This summary is based largely on the summary provided by the Congressional Research Service, a public domain source.

The Support for United States-Republic of Korea Civil Nuclear Cooperation Act would authorize the President to extend the term of the Agreement for Cooperation between the Government of the United States of America and the Government of the Republic of Korea Concerning Civil Uses of Atomic Energy to a date that is not later than March 19, 2016. The bill would direct the President to report to Congress every 180 days on the progress of negotiations on a new U.S.-Korea civil nuclear cooperation agreement.

== Congressional Budget Office report ==
This summary is based largely on the summary provided by the Congressional Budget Office, as ordered reported by the Senate Committee on Foreign Relations on January 15, 2014. This is a public domain source.

S. 1901 would authorize the President to extend the current nuclear cooperation agreement with the Republic of Korea for up to two years. That agreement is scheduled to expire in March of 2014. Under the Atomic Energy Act of 1954, such agreements are required for U.S. companies to be permitted to export commercial nuclear materials, technologies, and services to foreign nations. Extending the agreement would maintain ongoing civil nuclear cooperation with the Republic of Korea, and allow joint commercial activities to continue.

The Congressional Budget Office (CBO) estimates that the issuance of export licenses and continued certification and reporting requirements under the two-year extension would cost less than $500,000 over the 2014-2019 period, subject to the availability of appropriated funds. Enacting S. 1901 would not affect direct spending or revenues; therefore, pay-as-you-go procedures do not apply.

S. 1901 contains no intergovernmental or private-sector mandates as defined in the Unfunded Mandates Reform Act and would not affect the budgets of state, local, or tribal governments.

== Procedural history ==
The Support for United States-Republic of Korea Civil Nuclear Cooperation Act was introduced into the United States Senate on January 9, 2014 by Sen. Robert Menendez (D, NJ). It was referred to the United States Senate Committee on Foreign Relations, which reported it favorably without amendment on January 15, 2014. On January 27, 2014, the Senate voted by unanimous consent to pass the bill. The House voted to pass the bill in a voice vote on January 28, 2014.

== Debate and discussion ==
Rep. Ed Royce, the Chairman of the House Foreign Affairs Committee, supported the bill, saying that "passage of this legislation, which is vital to our ally South Korea, sends a strong message that we are committed to strengthening (the) critical relationship" between the United States and South Korea. Royce had previously introduced similar legislation in the House, the bill To authorize the President to extend the term of the Agreement for Cooperation between the Government of the United States of America and the Government of the Republic of Korea Concerning Civil Uses of Nuclear Energy (H.R. 2449; 113th Congress), that passed the House on September 17, 2013.

== See also ==
- List of bills in the 113th United States Congress
- South Korea–United States relations
- Nuclear power in South Korea
- South Korean nuclear research programs
