= Small Airplane Revitalization Act of 2013 =

- Long title: To ensure that the Federal Aviation Administration advances the safety of small airplanes, and the continued development of the general aviation industry, and for other purposes.
- Announced in: the 113th United States Congress
- Sponsored by: Rep. Mike Pompeo (R, KS-4)
- Number of co-sponsors: 4

Codification
- U.S.C. sections affected: 15 U.S.C. § 3701(note),
- Agencies affected: United States Congress, Federal Aviation Administration,

[H.R. 1848 Legislative history]
- Introduced in the House as H.R. 1848 by Rep. Mike Pompeo (R-KS) on May 7, 2013; Committee consideration by United States House Committee on Transportation and Infrastructure, United States House Transportation Subcommittee on Aviation

The Small Airplane Revitalization Act of 2013 (H.R. 1848) is a bill related to airplane regulations in the United States of America that was introduced into the United States House of Representatives during the 113th United States Congress. The bill would require the Federal Aviation Administration to adopt the recommendations of the "Part 23 Reorganization Aviation Rulemaking Committee" about ways to modernize regulations on small aircraft.

According to a fact sheet provided by the United States House Committee on Transportation and Infrastructure, the general aviation industry "includes nearly 600,000 pilots, employs roughly 1.3 million people, and contributes approximately $150 billion annually to the U.S. economy." The industry has been undergoing some recent decline, some of which is blamed on outdated and inappropriate regulations that stifle innovation and unnecessarily increase costs. The Federal Aviation Administration began to deal with this situation in August 2011 by chartering the "Part 23 Reorganization Aviation Rulemaking Committee." The Committee was "charged with creating a progressive, tier-based system so that small recreational airplanes won't have to be designed and certificated under the same regulatory requirements as heavier, more complex and higher performance aircraft." The Federal Aviation Regulations (FAR) are divided into different Parts, with Part 23 comprising the section of rules related to small planes. In June 2013, this Committee finished writing its recommendation for changes to make to FAR Part 23 "to remove barriers to bringing new, safer airplane designs to market." The Committee's recommendations included "(1) removing prescriptive methods of compliance, (2) ensuring safety objectives address future technologies, (3) utilizing FAA-accepted consensus standards, (4) developing globally acceptable regulations, and (5) implementing these recommendations as soon as possible." There is also the possibility that these new regulations will be adopted by other countries, helping to set international standards.

== Provisions/Elements of the bill ==
This summary is based largely on the summary provided by the Congressional Research Service, a public domain source.

The Small Airplane Revitalization Act of 2013 would direct the Administrator of the Federal Aviation Administration (FAA) to advance the safety and continued development of small airplanes by reorganizing the certification requirements to streamline the approval of safety advancements.

The bill would require the Administrator to issue a final rule meeting certain consensus-based standards and FAA Part 23 Reorganization Aviation Rulemaking Committee objectives, including to: (1) create a regulatory regime for small airplane safety; (2) set broad, outcome-driven objectives that will spur small plane innovation and technology adoption; (3) replace current, prescriptive requirements contained in FAA rules with performance-based regulations; and (4) use FAA-accepted consensus standards to clarify how Part 23 safety objectives may be met by specific small plane safety designs and technologies.

The final rule required by this bill would be due by December 31, 2015. On July 23, 2014, the FAA's associate administrator for aviation safety testified that the agency would miss the December 2015 deadline. The FAA estimated that the implementation of the new rules would not be completed until 2017.

== Procedural history ==
The Small Airplane Revitalization Act of 2013 was introduced into the House on May 7, 2013 by Rep. Mike Pompeo (R-KS). It was referred to the United States House Committee on Transportation and Infrastructure and the United States House Transportation Subcommittee on Aviation. On July 10, 2013, the bill was reported (amended) by a voice vote of the Committee. The House Majority Leader Eric Cantor placed the bill on the schedule for the week of July 15, 2013, and it passed unanimously (411-0) on July 18, 2013.

== Debate and discussion ==
Arguing in favor of the bill when he introduced it, Rep. Mike Pompeo said, "The existing outdated certification process needlessly increases the cost of safety and technology upgrades by up to 10 times. With this bill, we can ensure that the general aviation industry has what it needs to thrive."

The bill was supported by a number of aviation industry groups and companies. Michael Thacker, senior vice president of engineering at Cessna, an American aircraft company, spoke in favor of the bill, saying that "the active and willing participation of the FAA and other international regulatory bodies has been critical to the success of this effort so far." Pete Bunce, president and CEO of General Aviation Manufacturers Association (GAMA), an aviation industry trade association, also spoke in favor of the bill. The bill received additional support from Cirrus Aircraft co-founder and CEO, Dale Klapmeier, and Experimental Aircraft Association (EAA) Vice President, Doug Macnair.

The Small Aircraft Revitalization Act of 2013's companion bill, introduced by Sen. Amy Klobuchar (D-MN) and Sen. Lisa Murkowski (R-AK), S. 1072 (which is considered nearly identical), was criticized for two reasons by Aviation International News editor-in-chief Matt Thurber, an FAA antagonist. First, he argued that the bill was unlikely to make a difference because "the FAA, like any government bureaucracy, will not give up power without a big fight that could last for years or even decades." Second, he argued that the bill was too limited in scope; it dealt only with Part 23 covering regulations on new constructions, but does not do anything to fix regulations in Part 21 covering the modification of used planes (to update them with new safety equipment, autopilot, etc.). Despite these criticisms, the bill passed Congress on 14 November 2013, ultimately being signed by President Barack Obama on 27 November 2013. Klobuchar hailed the bill as having the ability to cut red tape for small aircraft manufacturers, and speed up the process of bringing new aircraft and jobs to the aviation market.

== See also ==
- List of bills in the 113th United States Congress
- Aviation safety
- Airplane
- Federal Aviation Administration
