= Reliable Home Heating Act =

- Long title: To address current emergency shortages of propane and other home heating fuels and to provide greater flexibility and information for Governors to address such emergencies in the future.
- Announced in: the 113th United States Congress
- Sponsored by: Sen. John Thune (R, SD)
- Number of co-sponsors: 3

Codification
- Agencies affected: Energy Information Administration, United States Department of Transportation, Federal Motor Carrier Safety Administration

Legislative history
- Introduced in the Senate as S. 2086 by Sen. John Thune (R, SD) on March 6, 2014; Committee consideration by United States Senate Committee on Commerce, Science and Transportation, United States House Committee on Transportation and Infrastructure, United States House Committee on Energy and Commerce; Passed the Senate on May 21, 2014 (unanimous consent); Passed the House on June 23, 2014 (voice vote); Signed into law by President Barack Obama on June 30, 2014

The Reliable Home Heating Act (S. 2086; Pub. L. 113–125 (text) (PDF)) is a U.S. public law that loosens some transportation regulations in order to try to deal with a home heating fuel shortage in some states. The law requires the Federal Motor Carrier Safety Administration (FMCSA) to exempt motor carriers that transport home heating oil from certain federal regulations if the Governor of a state declares a state of emergency caused by a shortage of residential heating fuel. It would also require the Energy Information Administration (EIA) to notify states if certain petroleum reserves fall below historical averages.

The bill became law during the 113th United States Congress.

== Background ==
Due to the extreme cold during the 2013–14 North American cold wave, Congress had authorized more heating fuels to be transported than usual because several states were running out of home heating fuel. Thirty-six states were under emergency orders that provided regulatory relief from the FMCSA during January 2014.

== Provisions of the bill ==
This summary is based largely on the summary provided by the Congressional Research Service, a public domain source.

The Reliable Home Heating Act would direct the Federal Motor Carrier Safety Administration (FMCSA) to recognize any 30-day emergency period declared by a state governor due to a shortage of residential heating fuel (and up to two additional 30-day periods) as one during which FMCSA federal motor carrier safety regulations shall not apply to any motor carrier or driver operating a commercial motor vehicle providing residential heating fuel in a geographic area designated as under a state of emergency.

The bill would define the term "residential heating fuel" to include heating oil, natural gas, and propane.

The bill would direct the Administrator of the Energy Information Administration, using data compiled from the Administration's Weekly Petroleum Status Reports, to notify the governor of each state in a Petroleum Administration for Defense District if that district's inventory of residential heating fuel has been below the most recent five-year average for more than three consecutive weeks.

The bill would declare that a covered emergency exemption from FMCSA federal motor carrier safety regulations shall remain in effect until May 31, 2014, unless the United States Secretary of Transportation (DOT) determines that the emergency for which the exemption was provided ends before that date.

The bill would define "covered emergency exemption" as one issued or extended between February 5, 2014, and the date of enactment of this Act to effect regulatory relief for commercial motor vehicle operations directly assisting the delivery of propane and home heating fuels.

The bill would state that nothing in this Act may be construed to prohibit the FMCSA from issuing or extending a covered emergency exemption beyond May 31, 2014, under other federal law.

== Congressional Budget Office report ==
This summary is based largely on the summary provided by the Congressional Budget Office, as ordered reported by the Senate Committee on Commerce, Science, and Transportation on April 9, 2014. This is a public domain source.

S. 2086 would require the Federal Motor Carrier Safety Administration (FMCSA) to exempt motor carriers that transport home heating oil from certain federal regulations if the Governor of a state declares a state of emergency caused by a shortage of residential heating fuel. The bill also would require the Energy Information Administration (EIA) to notify states if certain petroleum reserves fall below historical averages. Based on information from the affected agencies, the Congressional Budget Office (CBO) estimates that implementing the bill would have no significant effect on the federal budget. Enacting S. 2086 would not affect direct spending or revenues; therefore, pay-as-you-go procedures do not apply.

S. 2086 would require FMCSA to exempt commercial motor carriers that transport home heating oil from some federal regulations for up to 90 days in states where the Governor has declared a state of emergency caused by a shortage of residential heating fuel. Under current law, FMCSA may make such exemptions for up to 30 days. The bill also would require FMSCA to complete a rulemaking implementing the new authority and to study the effects of extending the regulatory exemptions. EIA would be required to notify states if certain petroleum reserves fall below the most recent five-year average for more than three consecutive weeks. Based on information from the agencies involved, CBO estimates that implementing the bill would not have any significant costs.

S. 2086 contains no intergovernmental or private-sector mandates as defined in the Unfunded Mandates Reform Act.

== Procedural history ==
The Reliable Home Heating Act was introduced into the United States Senate on March 6, 2014 by Sen. John Thune (R, SD). It was referred to the United States Senate Committee on Commerce, Science and Transportation and then reported alongside Senate report 113-162. The Senate voted on May 21, 2014 to pass the bill by unanimous consent. It was received in the United States House of Representatives on May 22, 2014 and referred to the United States House Committee on Transportation and Infrastructure and the United States House Committee on Energy and Commerce. On June 23, 2014, the House voted in a voice vote to pass the bill. President Barack Obama signed it into law on June 30, 2014.

== Debate and discussion ==
The National Governors Association (NGA) was in favor of the bill, arguing that it "would substantially improve the ability of governors to effectively address critical home heating fuel shortages in their states." The NGA argued that "it is critical that (the governors) are empowered with the resources they need to continue to provide such robust responses," such as their response to shortages after Hurricane Sandy.

Senator Thune, who introduced the bill said that he was "hopeful that this legislation will eliminate red tape for governors to better meet the needs of their residents and businesses during what can be very dangerous conditions."

== See also ==
- List of bills in the 113th United States Congress
