= Lake Hill Administrative Site Affordable Housing Act =

US Congressional Act

- Long title: To provide for the conveyance of the Forest Service Lake Hill Administrative Site in Summit County, Colorado.
- Announced in: the 113th United States Congress
- Sponsored by: Rep. Jared Polis (D, CO-2)
- Number of co-sponsors: 0

Citations
- Public law: Pub. L. 113–141 (text) (PDF)

Codification
- Acts affected: Forest Service Facility Realignment and Enhancement Act of 2005
- U.S.C. sections affected: 16 U.S.C. § 580d
- Agencies affected: United States Department of Agriculture, United States Forest Service

Legislative history
- Introduced in the House as H.R. 2337 by Jared Polis (D–CO) on June 12, 2013; Committee consideration by United States House Committee on Natural Resources, United States House Natural Resources Subcommittee on Public Lands and Environmental Regulation; Passed the House on October 29, 2013 (voice vote); Passed the Senate on July 9, 2014 (unanimous consent); Signed into law by President Barack Obama on July 25, 2014

The Lake Hill Administrative Site Affordable Housing Act (H.R. 2337; Pub. L. 113–141 (text) (PDF)) is a U.S. public law that requires the secretary of agriculture to sell 40 acres of Forest Service land near Frisco, Colorado. Summit County, Colorado, would use the land to build affordable housing. The law was introduced into the United States House of Representatives during the 113th United States Congress.

== Provisions of the bill ==
This summary is based largely on the summary provided by the Congressional Research Service, a public domain source.

The Lake Hill Administrative Site Affordable Housing Act would direct the secretary of agriculture (USDA), upon receiving an offer from Summit County, Colorado, in which the county agrees to be responsible for the costs specified below, to convey to the county all interest of the United States in the approximately 40 acres of National Forest System land in the county identified as the Lake Hill Administrative Site. The bill would make Summit County responsible for the processing and transaction costs related to the direct sale of the Administrative Site. The bill would require the proceeds received from such conveyance to be made available for capital improvement and maintenance of Forest Service facilities in Region 2 of the Forest Service.

== Congressional Budget Office report ==
This summary is based largely on the summary provided by the Congressional Budget Office, as ordered reported by the House Committee on Natural Resources on July 24, 2013. This is a public domain source.

H.R. 2337 would require the secretary of agriculture to sell 40 acres of Forest Service land near Frisco, Colorado. Based on information provided by the agency, the Congressional Budget Office (CBO) estimated that implementing the legislation would have a negligible impact on the federal budget. Enacting the bill would increase offsetting receipts and associated direct spending; therefore, pay-as-you-go procedures apply. However, the CBO estimated that those changes would have no significant net impact on future budget deficits. Enacting H.R. 2337 would not affect revenues.

The bill would require the secretary to sell the affected lands to Summit County, Colorado, for fair market value. Based on information provided by the Forest Service, CBO estimated that proceeds from the sale of those lands would increase offsetting receipts by about $5 million. Under the bill, the agency would be authorized to retain and spend those proceeds, without further appropriation, for capital improvement and maintenance of Forest Service facilities. The CBO expected that the agency would complete the sale and spend the proceeds within five years, and we estimate that enacting the bill would have no net impact on the federal budget over that period. In addition, the bill would require the county to pay for any administrative costs associated with the sale.

H.R. 2337 contains no intergovernmental or private-sector mandates as defined in the Unfunded Mandates Reform Act.

== Procedural history ==
The Lake Hill Administrative Site Affordable Housing Act was introduced into the House on June 12, 2013 by Rep. Jared Polis (D, CO-2). It was referred to the United States House Committee on Natural Resources and the United States House Natural Resources Subcommittee on Public Lands and Environmental Regulation. The bill was reported by the Committee alongside House Report 113-196 on H.R. 2337 on September 10, 2013. On October 25, 2013, House majority leader Eric Cantor announced that H.R. 2337 would be on the House schedule for the week of October 28, 2013. The bill was considered under the suspension of the rules. On October 29, 2013, the House voted to passed the bill by a voice vote. The United States Senate voted to pass the bill by unanimous consent on July 9, 2014. On July 25, 2014, President Barack Obama signed the bill into law.

== Debate and discussion ==
Arguing in favor of the bill, Rep. Polis said that "this bill is an important step towards helping the community use the Lake Hill property in a way that improves the quality of life in Summit County. H.R. 2337 is a win-win because it will add affordable housing opportunities while providing funding for U.S. Forest Service to improve administrative facilities."

== See also ==
- List of bills in the 113th United States Congress
