= PREEMIE Reauthorization Act =

Prematurity Research Expansion and Education for Mothers who deliver Infants Early Reauthorization Act
- Long title: To reduce preterm labor and delivery and the risk of pregnancy-related deaths and complications due to pregnancy, and to reduce infant mortality caused by prematurity.
- Acronyms (colloquial): PREEMIE Reauthorization Act
- Announced in: the 113th United States Congress
- Sponsored by: Sen. Lamar Alexander (R, TN)
- Number of co-sponsors: 6

Codification
- Acts affected: Public Health Service Act, Prematurity Research Expansion and Education for Mothers who deliver Infants Early Act
- U.S.C. sections affected: 42 U.S.C. § 247b–4f, 42 U.S.C. § 280g–5, 42 U.S.C. § 254c–8, 42 U.S.C. § 254c–14, 42 U.S.C. § 247b–4g, and others.
- Agencies affected: United States Congress, Department of Health and Human Services, Centers for Disease Control and Prevention
- Authorizations of appropriations: $25,000,000 for each of fiscal years 2014, 2015, 2016, 2017 and 2018

Legislative history
- Introduced in the Senate as S. 252 by Sen. Lamar Alexander (R, TN) on February 7, 2013; Committee consideration by United States Senate Committee on Health, Education, Labor, and Pensions, United States House Committee on Energy and Commerce, United States House Energy Subcommittee on Health; Passed the Senate on September 25, 2013 (voice vote)

The Prematurity Research Expansion and Education for Mothers who deliver Infants Early Reauthorization Act (S. 252) or PREEMIE Reauthorization Act is a bill that reauthorizes research programs on preterm births that are run by the Centers for Disease Control and Prevention. It also authorizes grants and demonstration programs to be run by the Health Resources and Services Administration that will try to decrease preterm births. The bill passed the United States Senate during the 113th United States Congress.

== Background ==
Similar legislation was introduced in 2012 during the 112th United States Congress. That bill, S. 1440, passed in the Senate.

== Provisions of the bill ==
This summary is based largely on the summary provided by the Congressional Research Service, a public domain source.

The Prematurity Research Expansion and Education for Mothers who deliver Infants Early Reauthorization Act or PREEMIE Reauthorization Act would amend the Prematurity Research Expansion and Education for Mothers who deliver Infants Early Act to revise and reauthorize requirements for research on prematurity and preterm births.

The bill would authorize the Director of the Centers for Disease Control and Prevention (CDC) to: (1) conduct epidemiological studies (as currently required) on the clinical, biological, social, environmental, genetic, and behavioral factors related to prematurity, as appropriate; (2) conduct activities to improve national data to facilitate tracking preterm births; and (3) continue efforts to prevent preterm birth through the identification of opportunities for prevention and the assessment of their impact.

The bill would authorize the Director of the Office for the Advancement of Telehealth to give preference in awarding grants to an eligible entity that proposes to use the grant funds to develop plans for, or to establish, telehealth networks that provide prenatal care for high-risk pregnancies.

The bill would revise and reauthorize through FY2017 the authority of the United States Secretary of Health and Human Services (HHS) to conduct demonstration projects related to preterm births. The bill would include as activities under such projects programs to test and evaluate various strategies to provide information and education to health care providers and the public on: (1) the core risk factors for preterm labor and delivery, medically indicated deliveries before full term, (2) the importance of preconception and prenatal care, (3) treatments and outcomes for premature infants, (4) meeting the informational needs of families during the stay of an infant in a neonatal intensive care unit, and (5) utilization of evidence-based strategies to prevent birth injuries. The bill would authorize as additional activities under such projects the establishment of programs to increase the availability, awareness, and use of pregnancy and post-term information services that provide evidence-based, clinical information through counselors, community outreach efforts, electronic or telephonic communication, or other appropriate means regarding causes associated with prematurity, birth defects, or health risks to a post-term infant.

The bill would repeal the establishment of the Interagency Coordinating Council on Prematurity and Low Birthweight.

The bill would authorize the Secretary to establish the Advisory Committee on Infant Mortality. The bill would direct the Advisory Committee (or an existing advisory committee designated by the Secretary) to develop, and periodically review and revise, a plan for conducting and supporting research, education, and programs on preterm birth through HHS.

Finally, the bill would require the Secretary to designate an appropriate agency within HHS to coordinate existing studies and report to the Secretary and Congress on hospital readmissions of preterm infants.

== Congressional Budget Office report ==
This summary is based largely on the summary provided by the Congressional Budget Office, as ordered reported by the Senate Committee on Health, Education, Labor, and Pensions on February 13, 2013. This is a public domain source.

S. 252 would amend provisions of the Public Health Service Act that authorize the Secretary of Health and Human Services to conduct research and education activities relating to preterm labor and delivery and infant mortality. Those activities would be implemented by the Director of the Centers for Disease Control and Prevention (CDC) and the Administrator of the Health Resources and Services Administration (HRSA). The bill also would authorize the Secretary to establish a council that would provide advice and recommendations on research, education, and programs on preterm birth through the United States Department of Health and Human Services.

For the activities described above, the bill would authorize the appropriation of about $10 million a year for each of fiscal years 2014 through 2018. The Congressional Budget Office (CBO) estimated that implementing the bill would cost $4 million in 2014 and $42 million over the 2014-2018 period, assuming the appropriation of the authorized amounts. Pay-as-you-go procedures do not apply to this legislation because it would not affect direct spending or revenues.

The bill contains no intergovernmental or private-sector mandates as defined in the Unfunded Mandates Reform Act.

== Procedural history ==
The PREEMIE Reauthorization Act was introduced into the Senate on February 7, 2013 by Sen. Lamar Alexander (R, TN). It was referred to the United States Senate Committee on Health, Education, Labor, and Pensions. On September 25, 2013, the Senate voted by a voice vote to pass the bill.

The PREEMIE Reauthorization Act was received in the United States House of Representatives on September 26, 2013. It was referred to the United States House Committee on Energy and Commerce and the United States House Energy Subcommittee on Health. On November 8, 2013, House Majority Leader Eric Cantor announced that the PREEMIE Reauthorization Act would be considered under a suspension of the rules on the House floor on November 12, 2013.

== Debate and discussion ==
The March of Dimes spoke out in favor of the bill, urging people to tell Congress that they support the bill.

== See also ==
- List of bills in the 113th United States Congress
