= 2025 United States federal budget =

2025 Budget of the United States federal government
- Country: United States
- Total revenue: $5.235 trillion (actual)
- Total expenditures: $7.01 trillion (actual)
- Deficit: $1.775 trillion (actual)

The United States federal budget for fiscal year 2025 ran from October 1, 2024 to September 30, 2025. The federal government operated under a full-year continuing resolution passed in March 2025, which extended the 2024 budget for the whole 2025 fiscal year, with limited changes.

== Background ==
The Fiscal Responsibility Act of 2023, passed in June 2023, resolved that year's debt-ceiling crisis and set spending caps for FY2024 and FY2025. The act called for $895 billion in defense spending and $711 billion in non-defense discretionary spending for fiscal year 2025, representing a 1% increase over fiscal year 2024.

In the 118th Congress (2023-2024), the right-wing House Freedom Caucus secured several House of Representatives seats. Many Freedom Caucus members initially did not support the party's nominee, Kevin McCarthy, for speaker, although McCarthy won on the 15th ballot after agreeing to give hardliners seats on the Rules Committee, which controls which bills come to the floor, to lower the threshold for a motion to vacate the chair to one member, and to push for steep spending cuts. However, Republican infighting and opposition from Democrats meant that Republicans were unable to pass a complete budget. In response, McCarthy cut deals with Democrats to raise the debt ceiling and keep the government open. This led to his removal as speaker and the election of Mike Johnson as speaker. Johnson also cut spending deals with Democrats for fiscal year 2024, but a motion to remove him was unsuccessful.

Several authorization bills passed in mid-2024 continued tensions that had started during the previous year's appropriations process. On April 12, the House passed a modified reauthorization of the Foreign Intelligence Surveillance Act. The final vote was 273–147 with Democrats delivering votes to protect U.S. national security under Section 702. On May 15, the House voted to pass the FAA Reauthorization Act of 2024, which included programs to improve safety and protect consumers; more Democrats than Republicans voted for the five-year reauthorization, 195–192.

As the House continued to pass a series of key legislative victories that were supported by a majority of Democrats, far right Republicans continued to threaten a motion to remove Mike Johnson from his Speaker of the House chair. However, Jeffries hinted at providing a lifeline to Johnson in an interview with the New York Times. On May 8, 2024, Rep. Marjorie Taylor Greene (who had strongly opposed Johnson's resolve to provide Ukraine with further aid) introduced the motion to vacate Johnson's speakership on the floor, forcing a vote on it within two legislative days. However, citing Johnson's decision to hold a vote on the legislative package to aid allies abroad, Jeffries and Democratic leaders said Democrats would "vote to table Rep. Marjorie Taylor Greene's Motion to Vacate the Chair". The House voted to table (kill) the motion by a vote of 359–43, allowing Johnson to remain speaker. 196 Republicans and 163 Democrats voted to table the motion; 11 Republicans and 32 Democrats voted against tabling the motion. The Democrats who supported Johnson claimed they did so because of the vital role he had played in providing funding for the federal government and for Ukraine. Greene did not rule out forcing another vote to oust Johnson.The Wall Street Journal wrote that Jeffries "flexes power as Mike Johnson flounders".

== Appropriations legislation ==
During the summer of 2024, House Republicans, however, looked to pass partisan spending bills, which included a 6% cut to non-defense spending and added restrictions on abortion access, environmental programs, gender-affirming care, and diversity initiatives. Although these bills were considered dead on arrival in the Senate, Republicans hoped to pass all 12 regular appropriations bills before the August recess to gain a better hand in negotiations. They passed five bills largely along party lines but failed to pass additional bills due to internal disagreements over policy riders.

=== September 2024 continuing resolution ===
==== First proposal ====
On September 9, with only 22 days left until funding appropriated in 2024 expired, the Continuing Appropriations and Other Matters Act, 2025 (H.R. 9494) was introduced. The bill combined a continuing appropriations provision, which renewed government funding at the previous year's levels for six more months, with a voting reform measure that would have made it compulsory to show proof of citizenship before voting in federal elections.

The proposed Act drew criticism from Democrats (who believed the new voting requirements could disenfranchise poor American citizens unable to afford I.D. renewal) and hardline Republicans (who were disappointed by the lack of spending cuts).

On September 18, the House rejected the draft law in a 202–220 vote. 199 Republicans and 3 Democrats voted in favor; 14 Republicans and 206 Democrats voted against. In addition, two Republicans (Marjorie Taylor Greene and Thomas Massie) voted "present".

Continuing Appropriations and Other Matters Act, 2025 – Vote in the House of Representatives (September 18, 2024)
Party	Votes for	Votes against	Votes present	Not voting/Absent
Republican (220)	199	14: Jim Banks; Andy Biggs; Lauren Boebert; Tim Burchett; Eli Crane; Matt Gaetz; Wesley Hunt; Doug Lamborn; Nancy Mace; Cory Mills; Mike Rogers; Matt Rosendale; Greg Steube; Beth Van Duyne	2: Thomas Massie; Marjorie Taylor Greene	5: Anthony D'Esposito; Neal Dunn; Kay Granger; Nick LaLota; Nicole Malliotakis
Democratic (211)	3: Don Davis; Jared Golden; Marie Gluesenkamp Perez	206	0	2: Dwight Evans; Raúl Grijalva
Total (431) (Note: 4 seats vacant)	202	220	2	7

==== Second proposal ====
Subsequently, House Speaker Mike Johnson proposed a clean continuing resolution, the Continuing Appropriations and Extensions Act, 2025 (H.R. 9747, Pub. L. 118–83 (text) (PDF)), funding the government until December 20. The bill passed the House on September 25 by a vote of 341 to 82 and the Senate on September 25 by a vote of 78 to 18; it was signed into law by President Biden on September 26.

Continuing Appropriations and Extensions Act, 2025 – Vote in the House of Representatives (September 25, 2024)
Party	Votes for	Votes against	Votes present	Not voting/Absent
Republican (220)	132	82: Jim Baird; Troy Balderson; Jim Banks; Aaron Bean; Andy Biggs; Gus Bilirakis; Dan Bishop; Lauren Boebert; Mike Bost; Josh Brecheen; Tim Burchett; Eric Burlison; Kat Cammack; Michael Cloud; Andrew Clyde; Mike Collins; Eli Crane; John Curtis; Warren Davidson; Byron Donalds; Jeff Duncan; Ron Estes; Mike Ezell; Randy Feenstra; Brad Finstad; Michelle Fischbach; Russell Fry; Russ Fulcher; Matt Gaetz; Tony Gonzales; Bob Good; Lance Gooden; Paul Gosar; Marjorie Taylor Greene; Morgan Griffith; Michael Guest; Harriet Hageman; Andy Harris; Clay Higgins; Jim Jordan; John Joyce; Trent Kelly; Darin LaHood; Laurel Lee; Debbie Lesko; Greg Lopez; Anna Paulina Luna; Morgan Luttrell; Nancy Mace; Tracey Mann; Thomas Massie; Tom McClintock; Rich McCormick; Mary Miller; Max Miller; Cory Mills; Alex Mooney; Barry Moore; Nathaniel Moran; Ralph Norman; Andy Ogles; Gary Palmer; Scott Perry; Bill Posey; John Rose; Matt Rosendale; Chip Roy; David Schweikert; Keith Self; Victoria Spartz; Claudia Tenney; Tom Tiffany; William Timmons; Jeff Van Drew; Beth Van Duyne; Derrick Van Orden; Michael Waltz; Randy Weber; Daniel Webster; Bruce Westerman; Roger Williams; Rudy Yakym	0	6: Scott DesJarlais; Drew Ferguson; Kay Granger; Wesley Hunt; Troy Nehls; Greg Steube
Democratic (212)	209	0	0	3: Jamaal Bowman; Dwight Evans; Raúl Grijalva
Total (432) (Note: 3 seats vacant)	341	82	0	9

Continuing Appropriations and Extensions Act, 2025 – Vote in the Senate (September 25, 2024)
Party	Votes for	Votes against	Votes present	Not voting/Absent
Republican (49)	28	18: Marsha Blackburn; Mike Braun; Katie Britt; Ted Budd; Mike Crapo; Deb Fischer; Bill Hagerty; Josh Hawley; Ron Johnson; Mike Lee; Roger Marshall; Markwayne Mullin; Rand Paul; Pete Ricketts; Jim Risch; Eric Schmitt; Tim Scott; Tommy Tuberville	0	3: Tom Cotton; Rick Scott; JD Vance
Democratic (47)	46	0	0	1: Chris Coons
Independent (4)	4: Angus King; Joe Manchin; Bernie Sanders; Kyrsten Sinema	0	0	0
Total (100)	78	18	0	4

=== December 2024 continuing resolution ===
In the 2024 United States elections, Donald Trump was elected president, and the Republican Party won majorities in the House of Representatives and Senate. The new Congress took office on January 3, 2025, where Republicans held a narrow majority in the House, and the Democratic Party held a narrow majority in the Senate. Democrat Joe Biden continued to serve as president until Trump's inauguration on January 20.

==== First proposal ====
On December 17, congressional leaders released a bipartisan continuing resolution, the Further Continuing Appropriations and Disaster Relief Supplemental Appropriations Act, 2025 (H.R. 10445). The bill contained an extension of government funding to March 14, 2025, a one-year extension of the farm bill, and $110 billion in disaster aid. The bill, which was 1,547 pages, was described as a Christmas tree bill due to its inclusion of unrelated policy riders. These included $10 billion in economic aid for farmers, restrictions on US capital investment in China, transferring ownership of RFK Stadium to the District of Columbia allowing for a new Washington Commanders stadium, extensions of numerous healthcare programs, legislation requiring pharmacy benefit managers to pass 100% of rebates to sponsors of prescription drug plans, several tech and AI related bills, legislation requiring ticket sellers to list the full prices of each ticket, provisions allowing gas stations to sell E15 fuel year-round, and an effective 3.8% pay increase for members of Congress.

Even before the bill was released, numerous hardline Republicans came out against it, criticizing the lack of member input in its development and the riders, which they called unnecessary and wasteful. Elon Musk, a top Republican donor and proposed head of the newly created Department of Government Efficiency, posted over 100 times on X in opposition to the bill, making numerous misleading claims, and was widely credited for its eventual defeat. About 12 hours after Musk first came out against the package, Trump and Vice President-elect JD Vance released a statement criticizing the deal, calling it a "Democrat giveaway," leading to Johnson abandoning the bill. Trump called for pairing government funding with an increase to the debt ceiling, which was scheduled to be reached sometime between January and June 2025, and later argued it should be abolished entirely. Democrats criticized Republicans for walking away from a bipartisan deal after Musk, the richest man in the world, came out against it, with Senator Bernie Sanders calling it "oligarchy at work" and many insinuating that Musk was the "shadow president."

==== Second proposal ====
On December 19, President-elect Donald Trump issued a statement demanding the removal of additional spending (except for disaster relief and aid to farmers) and the suspension of the debt ceiling (due to be reached in 2025). After several hours of negotiations, House Republicans announced the (first) American Relief Act, 2025 (H.R. 10515) the same day. The bill, similar to the previous one, extended government funding to March 14 while providing disaster aid and prolonging the farm bill but also suspended the debt ceiling until 2027. It removed most of the riders in the previous bill, except for economic assistance for farmers and some healthcare extensions. Trump announced his support for the bill. Democratic leaders quickly came out against the bill, saying they were not involved in the negotiations and that the bill, which removed most riders sought by Democrats while keeping those sought by Republicans, was "laughable." However, many hardline Republicans opposed raising the debt ceiling without spending cuts. Republicans brought the bill to the floor later that day under suspension of the rules, which requires a 2/3rds majority to pass. The House rejected the proposal by a vote of 174 to 235, with most Democrats joining 38 Republicans in voting against it. Jeffries criticized Republicans for abandoning the bipartisan deal at the very last moment.

American Relief Act – Vote in the House of Representatives (December 19, 2024)
Party	Votes for	Votes against	Votes present	Not voting/Absent
Republican (219)	172	38: Aaron Bean; Andy Biggs; Josh Brecheen; Tim Burchett; Eric Burlison; Kat Cammack; Michael Cloud; Andrew Clyde; Eli Crane; John Curtis; Jeff Duncan; Russ Fulcher; Bob Good; Paul A. Gosar; Andy Harris; Wesley Hunt; Doug Lamborn; Debbie Lesko; Greg Lopez; Morgan Luttrell; Nancy Mace; Thomas Massie; Rich McCormick; Cory Mills; Alex Mooney; Blake Moore; Nathaniel Moran; Ralph Norman; Andrew Ogles; Scott Perry; Bill Posey; Matt Rosendale; Chip Roy; David Schweikert; Keith Self; Victoria Spartz; Tom Tiffany; Beth Van Duyne	0	9: Brian Babin; Mike Garcia; Kay Granger; Mike Kelly; Blaine Luetkemeyer; Dan Newhouse; Cathy McMorris Rodgers; Greg Steube; Roger Williams
Democratic (211)	2: Kathy Castor; Marie Gluesenkamp Perez	197	1: Marcy Kaptur	11: Earl Blumenauer; Dwight Evans; Lizzie Fletcher; Josh Gottheimer; Raúl Grijalva; Ted Lieu; Grace Napolitano; Nancy Pelosi; Dean Phillips; Mikie Sherrill; Tom Suozzi
Total (430) (Note: 5 seats vacant)	174	235	1	20

==== Third proposal ====
One day after the rejection of the second proposal, Republicans released a third remodeled bill, also called the American Relief Act, 2025 (H.R. 10445, Pub. L. 118–158 (text) (PDF)) which was essentially the same as the second bill, but without the suspension of the debt ceiling as proposed by Donald Trump. Republicans also announced that they had reached a handshake agreement with President-elect Trump to cut $2.5 trillion in government spending in exchange for a $1.5 trillion debt ceiling hike. The agreement was not part of the third proposal nor voted on by the House.

The bill was passed on December 20 in the House by a 366–34 vote, with one member voting present. Only one Democrat did not vote for the bill, while 34 Republicans voted against it. Early the next morning, in the Senate, the bill passed by an 85–11 vote, and Biden signed the bill later that day, funding the government through March 14, 2025. Although the deadline had passed before the bill was voted and signed in, as federal funding is tracked daily, the Office of Management and Budget didn't activate the shutdown procedures and directed agencies to continue normal operations based on the high probability of the resolution being passed following the successful House vote.

American Relief Act – Vote in the House of Representatives (December 20, 2024)
Party	Votes for	Votes against	Votes present	Not voting/Absent
Republican (219)	170	34: Jim Banks; Andy Biggs; Dan Bishop; Lauren Boebert; Josh Brecheen; Tim Burchett; Eric Burlison; Michael Cloud; Andrew Clyde; Eli Crane; John Curtis; Scott DesJarlais; Russ Fulcher; Tony Gonzales; Bob Good; Lance Gooden; Glenn Grothman; Andy Harris; Diana Harshbarger; Wesley Hunt; Debbie Lesko; Greg Lopez; Nancy Mace; Thomas Massie; Rich McCormick; Cory Mills; Alex Mooney; Andrew Ogles; Scott Perry; Matt Rosendale; Chip Roy; Keith Self; Tom Tiffany; Beth Van Duyne	0	15: Larry Bucshon; Michael C. Burgess; Pat Fallon; Drew Ferguson; Mike Garcia; Kay Granger; Marjorie Taylor Greene; Doug Lamborn; Blaine Luetkemeyer; Dan Newhouse; Cathy McMorris Rodgers; Greg Steube; Michael Waltz; Brad Wenstrup; Roger Williams
Democratic (211)	196	0	1: Jasmine Crockett	14: Colin Allred; Earl Blumenauer; Jim Clyburn; Jim Costa; Dwight Evans; Lizzie Fletcher; John Garamendi; Raúl Grijalva; Ted Lieu; Seth Moulton; Grace Napolitano; Nancy Pelosi; Dean Phillips; Tom Suozzi
Total (430)	366	34	1	29

American Relief Act – Vote in the Senate (December 21, 2024)
Party	Votes for	Votes against	Votes present	Not voting/Absent
Republican (49)	37	10: Mike Braun; Mike Crapo; Josh Hawley; Ron Johnson; John Kennedy; Mike Lee; Rand Paul; James Risch; Mitt Romney; Eric Schmitt	0	2: Marco Rubio; JD Vance
Democratic (47)	46	0	0	1: Adam Schiff
Independent (4)	2: Angus King; Kyrsten Sinema	1: Bernie Sanders	0	1: Joe Manchin
Total (100)	85	11	0	4

=== March 2025 full-year continuing resolution ===
In the 119th Congress, on March 8, 2025, the House introduced the Full-Year Continuing Appropriations and Extensions Act, 2025 (H.R. 1968, Pub. L. 119–4 (text) (PDF)), a full-year continuing resolution bill that would extend existing funding levels to September 30, 2025 (the end of the fiscal year), though with some adjustments (including a limited raise of defense spending and a limited specific reductions to non-defense spending). The year long continuing resolution was endorsed by President Trump, who said it would "FREEZE Spending this year".

On March 11, the House passed the bill by a vote of 217 to 213. All Republicans present except Thomas Massie voted in favor and all Democrats present except Jared Golden voted against.

Despite Republicans holding a majority in the Senate, Republicans had less than the 60 votes to bypass a fillibuster. In order to avoid a government shutdown, at least 7 Democrats would have had to support cloture on the bill. On March 14, the Senate invoked cloture on the bill, avoiding a fillibuster, by a vote of 62 to 38. 9 Democrats and one Democratic-affiliated independent voted in favor: their votes proved decisive, as Republicans held only 53 seats, and, under Senate rules, at least 60 votes are required for cloture. Democratic Senate leader Chuck Schumer, despite criticizing the bill as inadequate, urged a "yes" vote on cloture to avoid a government shutdown. Later the same day, the Senate passed the bill by a vote of 54 to 46. President Trump signed it into law on March 15.

Full-Year Continuing Appropriations and Extensions Act, 2025 – Vote in the House of Representatives (March 11, 2025)
Party	Votes for	Votes against	Votes present	Not voting/Absent
Republican (218)	216	1: Thomas Massie	0	1: Tim Moore
Democratic (214)	1: Jared Golden	212	0	1: Raúl Grijalva
Total (432)	217	213	0	2

Full-Year Continuing Appropriations and Extensions Act – Cloture vote in the Senate (March 14, 2025)
Party	Votes for	Votes against	Votes present	Not voting/Absent
Republican (53)	52	1: Rand Paul	0	0
Democratic (45)	9: Catherine Cortez Masto; Dick Durbin; John Fetterman; Kirsten Gillibrand; Maggie Hassan; Gary Peters; Brian Schatz; Chuck Schumer; Jeanne Shaheen	36	0	0
Independent (2)	1: Angus King	1: Bernie Sanders	0	0
Total (100)	62	38	0	0

Full-Year Continuing Appropriations and Extensions Act – Vote in the Senate (March 14, 2025)
Party	Votes for	Votes against	Votes present	Not voting/Absent
Republican (53)	52	1: Rand Paul	0	0
Democratic (45)	1: Jeanne Shaheen	44	0	0
Independent (2)	1: Angus King	1: Bernie Sanders	0	0
Total (100)	54	46	0	0

== Budget resolution ==
To enact President Trump's policy agenda into law, Republicans announced they would look to pass a reconciliation bill to avoid a filibuster in the Senate. The reconciliation process begins with the Senate and House passing identical budget resolutions containing instructions for spending targets. Senate Republican leadership and the House Freedom Caucus pushed for a two-bill reconciliation approach, with one bill focusing on the southern border and energy policy and the second focusing on tax policy. President Trump and House Republican leadership pushed for a one-bill approach.

== Reconciliation bill ==
With the budget resolution passed, the next step was for congressional committees to identify specific cuts within its framework, and draft them into a reconciliation bill to be voted on by Congress. On July 4, the One Big Beautiful Bill Act was signed into law.
