= 2026 United States federal budget =

United States federal budget

2026 Budget of the United States federal government
- Submitted by: Donald Trump
- Submitted to: 119th Congress
- Country: United States
- Deficit: $1.99 trillion (actual)

The United States federal budget for fiscal year 2026 ran from October 1, 2025 to September 30, 2026.

The 2025 federal government shutdown occurred at the beginning of the fiscal year. It lasted until November 12, when a continuing resolution and three of the twelve full appropriations bills were enacted. In mid-January 2026, three additional bills were enacted. The four-day 2026 federal government shutdown occurred due to delays in the House passing a package containing five more bills, plus a continuing resolution for the Department of Homeland Security, the only remaining agency without year-long appropriations.

Over the long term, the Congressional Budget Office (CBO) projected that spending on Social Security and Medicare would continue to increase, driven in part by an aging population and rising federal healthcare costs. Similarly, the Government Accountability Office (GAO) reported that projected deficits are primarily caused by the growth in program spending—particularly Social Security, Medicare, and other federal healthcare programs—as well as increasing interest costs. Continued deficits have also increased the federal debt, which adds to the government's interest expenses and exacerbates fiscal pressures.

== Background ==
The 2024 United States elections resulted in the Republican Party having control in all three legislative chambers, the House (220–215), the Senate (53–47), and the presidency. However, because appropriation legislation can still be fillibustered in the Senate, 60 votes are required to pass government funding in that body.

In 2025, for the first time since 2013, Congress funded the government through a full-year continuing resolution in March 2025. The passage of the legislation was controversial among some Democrats, because a small number Democrats in the Senate voted with Republicans to pass the continuing resolution and avert a government shutdown.

== Early appropriations proposals ==
During the summer of 2025, House Republicans, passed three partisan spending bills, mostly along party lines. Due to disagreements with the Senate over spending levels, the House voted to conference three spending bills with the Senate. Without a continuing resolution, government funding expired after midnight on October 1, 2025, triggering a government shutdown. The shutdown ended on November 12 with the enactment of a continuing resolution, extending funding through January 30, 2026.

=== Continuing resolution proposals ===
On September 16, 2025, House Republicans unveiled a continuing resolution to keep the government funded under current spending levels until November 21. Republicans called the proposal a clean continuing resolution, lacking partisan policy riders. The resolution also includes $30 million for lawmaker security. Democrats criticized the proposal because it lacked extensions for Affordable Care Act tax credits. The Republican bill passed the House on September 19 in a 217–212 vote. Fiscal conservative Republicans Thomas Massie of Kentucky and Victoria Spartz of Indiana voted against the bill. Moderate Democrat Jared Golden of Maine voted for it. Moderate Democrat Marie Gluesenkamp Perez missed the vote, but later said she supported the bill.

On September 17, House and Senate Democrats unveiled a separate continuing resolution to keep the government funded until October 31. The Democratic proposal would permanently extend Affordable Care Act tax credits, roll back cuts to Medicaid that had been implemented in the One Big Beautiful Bill Act, restore funding cut in the Rescissions Act of 2025, and include $320 million for lawmaker security.

On September 18, the Senate agreed by unanimous consent to take up both the Democratic and Republican proposals, in that order, with three-fifths required to pass. The Democratic proposal failed in a 47–45 vote along party-lines on September 19. Later that day, the Republican bill failed to pass in the Senate in a 44–48 vote. Two Republicans, Fiscal Conservative Republican Rand Paul of Kentucky and Moderate Republican Lisa Murkowski of Alaska, voted against the bill. Moderate Democrat John Fetterman of Pennsylvania was the only Democrat to support the bill.

=== Further negotiations ===
On September 20, 2025, after the two failed votes in the Senate, Moderate Republican Lisa Murkowski of Alaska, who voted against both proposals, released a framework for a continuing resolution to keep the government open until November 21, 2025. The framework calls for a one year extension of Affordable Care Act tax credits, $30 million in funding for the Corporation for Public Broadcasting to be prioritized for rural NPR stations, and funding programs cut by the Office of Management and Budget's September 2025 pocket rescission.

Senate minority leader Chuck Schumer and House minority leader Hakeem Jeffries, both Democrats from New York, announced plans to meet with President Trump on Thursday, September 25 to negotiate a continuing resolution. However, on September 23, Trump canceled the meeting through a post on Truth Social. In the post, President Trump wrote after "reviewing the details of the unserious and ridiculous demands" from Democrats "I have decided that no meeting with their Congressional Leaders could possibly be productive."

On September 24, 2025, the Office of Management and Budget, an office within the Executive Office of the President of the United States, released a memo requesting federal agencies prepare "reduction in force" plans in the case of a government shutdown.

President Trump hosted a meeting with Speaker Mike Johnson, Senate majority leader John Thune, Senate minority leader Chuck Schumer and House minority leader Hakeem Jeffries on Monday, September 29 to negotiate a continuing resolution. No progress was made.

On September 30, 2025, hours before the shutdown began, the Senate voted again on the Democratic and Republican plans. The Democratic plan again failed on party lines (47 in favor, 53 against). All Republicans except Paul, along with Democrats Catherine Cortez Masto of Nevada and John Fetterman, as well as Angus King of Maine, an independent who caucuses with Democrats, voted for the Republican plan, which thus failed 55–45. Despite receiving a majority of votes in the Senate, the Republican failed to pass because it could not overcome a 60-vote filibuster. After the votes, the Office of Management and Budget directed agencies to execute their shutdown plans.

== 2025 government shutdown ==
With no agreement on a continuing resolution, the federal government shut down at 12:01 a.m. EDT.

On October 1, 2025, during a third vote in the Senate on Republican and Democratic plans to end the shutdown, Republican and Democratic Senators held preliminary negotiations on the Senate floor. The Senators discussed shortening the length of the Republican planned continuing resolution in order to use that time to come to a more significant agreement. No agreement was made. Both versions again failed by votes of 55–45 and 47–53, respectively. Senators of both parties called the preliminary negotiation a "productive discussion."

The Republican-led Senate has continued to force votes on the Republican led continuing resolution. These votes have all failed, mostly along party lines. Bucking from their parties, Democratic senators Cortez Masto and Fetterman and independent King have continued to vote for the bill. Republican senator Rand Paul has continued to vote against the bill.

On October 6, President Trump claimed talks were underway with Democrats, which Chuck Schumer said was not true.

=== November agreement ===
Continuing Appropriations, Agriculture, Legislative Branch, Military Construction and Veterans Affairs, and Extensions Act, 2026
- Long title: An Act making continuing appropriations and extensions for fiscal year 2026, and for other purposes.
- Enacted by: the 119th United States Congress
- Effective: November 12, 2025

Citations
- Public law: Pub. L. 119–37 (menu; GPO has not yet published law)

Legislative history
- Introduced in the House as H.R. 5371 by R‑OK 4th on September 16, 2025; Committee consideration by House Committee on Appropriations; Passed the House on September 19, 2025 (217–212); Passed the Senate on November 10, 2025 (60–40) with amendment; House agreed to Senate amendment on November 12, 2025 (222–209); Signed into law by President Donald Trump on November 12, 2025

On November 9, 2025, after negotiations between Senate Democrats and Senate Republicans, a deal was revealed to end the shutdown. The agreement would include a continuing resolution that would fund the government until the end of January, and full-year appropriations bills for the Departments of Veterans Affairs and Agriculture, military construction, and the Legislative Branch.

The full-year bills include $203.5 million to fund security for members of Congress and $852 million for US Capitol Police. In addition, the continuing resolution guarantees that federal employees who faced lay-offs during the shutdown be rehired and granted backpay. It would additionally bar the Office of Management and Budget from implementing mass layoffs of federal workers throughout the length of the continuing resolution. The deal also guarantees a vote in the Senate to extend Affordable Care Act subsidies. The continuing resolution would need to pass both the House and the Senate, and be signed into law by the President, before the government shutdown could end.

After the deal was announced, House minority leader Hakeem Jeffries stated that House Democrats would not support any measure which did not guarantee an extension of Affordable Care Act subsidies. Democrats do not possess the votes in the House to defeat the measure, assuming all House Republicans vote for it, in the event that it passes the Senate.

The Senate voted 60–40 on the night of November 9 to advance the agreement. Eight Senate Democrats (Durbin, King, Hassan, Shaheen, Cortez Masto, Rosen, Fetterman, and Kaine) joined all Senate Republicans but Rand Paul to advance it. On November 12, the House passed the bill by a 222–209 vote. President Trump signed the bill into law later that day.

Senate vote on passage
Party	Votes for	Votes against	Not voting/Absent
Republican (53)	52	1: Rand Paul	—N/a
Democratic (45)	7: Catherine Cortez Masto; Dick Durbin; John Fetterman; Maggie Hassan; Tim Kaine; Jacky Rosen; Jeanne Shaheen	38	—N/a
Independent (2)	1: Angus King	1: Bernie Sanders	—N/a
Total (100)	60	40	—N/a

House vote on passage
Party	Votes for	Votes against	Not voting/Absent
Republican (219)	216	2: Thomas Massie; Greg Steube	1: Mike McCaul
Democratic (214)	6: Henry Cuellar; Don Davis; Jared Golden; Adam Gray; Marie Gluesenkamp Perez; Tom Suozzi	216	1: Bonnie Watson Coleman
Total (433)	222	209	2

== January 2026 negotiations ==
A package was enacted in January 2026 including the appropriations bills for Interior and Environment; Commerce, Justice, and science (including NASA and the National Science Foundation); and Energy and water development activities of the Army Corps of Engineers and Department of the Interior. The House passed H.R. 6938 on January 8 by a vote of 397–28, and the Senate passed it on January 15 by vote of 82–15. It was signed by President Trump on January 23.

Senate vote on passage
Party	Votes for	Votes against	Not voting/Absent
Republican (53)	46	5: Ron Johnson; Mike Lee; Cynthia Lummis; Rand Paul; Rick Scott	2: Bill Hagerty; Ashley Moody
Democratic (45)	35	9: Michael Bennet; Cory Booker; John Hickenlooper; Andy Kim; Ed Markey; Chris Murphy; Alex Padilla; Adam Schiff; Elizabeth Warren	1: Gary Peters
Independent (2)	1: Angus King	1: Bernie Sanders	—N/a
Total (100)	71	15	3

House vote on passage
Party	Votes for	Votes against	Not voting/Absent
Republican (218)	191	22	5
Democratic (213)	206	6: Jason Crow; Hank Johnson; Joe Neguse; Brittany Pettersen; Rashida Tlaib; Juan Vargas	1: Kweisi Mfume
Total (431)	397	28	6

Also in January 2026, the House and Senate appropriations committees agreed to three additional bipartisan bills containing the remainder of the appropriations. As of late January, all three packages have been passed by the House and are awaiting action by the Senate:

- State and related national security functions; and Treasury and general government, a category that includes the Executive Office of the President, Judicial Branch, District of Columbia, and several independent agencies: The House passed H.R. 7006 on January 14 by a vote of 341–79.
- Defense; Transportation and Housing and Urban Development; and Health and Human Services, Labor, and Education: H.R. 7148 passed the House on January 22.
- Homeland Security: H.R. 7147 also passed the House on January 22.

These three bills were combined into one bill before being sent to the Senate using a mechanism pursuant to H.Res. 1014 by which the text of all three bills was consolidated into H.R. 7148 when the bill was engrossed before being transmitted to the Senate.

House vote on passage (H.R. 7006)
Party	Votes for	Votes against	Not voting/Absent
Republican (218)	188	22	8
Democratic (213)	153	57	3
Total (431)	341	79	11

House vote on passage (H.R. 7148)
Party	Votes for	Votes against	Not voting/Absent
Republican (218)	192	24	2
Democratic (213)	149	64	—N/a
Total (431)	341	88	2

House vote on passage (H.R. 7147)
Party	Votes for	Votes against	Not voting/Absent
Republican (218)	213	1: Thomas Massie	4
Democratic (213)	7: Henry Cuellar; Don Davis; Laura Gillen; Jared Golden; Vicente Gonzalez; Marie Gluesenkamp Perez; Tom Suozzi	206	—N/a
Total (431)	220	207	4

== 2026 government shutdowns ==
However, following the killing of Alex Pretti by Customs and Border Protection (CBP) agents on January 24, 2026, Democrats in the Senate announced they would no longer support the Department of Homeland Security (DHS) bill, which funds CBP.

On January 29, 2026, the Senate failed to advance the government funding package in a 45–55 vote. Seven Republicans joined all Democrats in opposing the bill. Most of the Republicans voting against the bill were fiscal conservatives, including Ron Johnson of Wisconsin, Tommy Tuberville of Alabama, Mike Lee of Utah, Rand Paul of Kentucky and Rick Scott and Ashley Moody of Florida. Unlike the Democrats, these Republicans are seeking more funding cuts and are generally opposed to a new deal between Republicans and Democrats for Homeland Security funding.

Later that day, a deal was announced in the Senate to separate the DHS funding bill H.R. 7147, and pass a package containing the other five bills plus a two-week continuing resolution for DHS. Passage was briefly delayed by a hold placed by Senator Lindsey Graham, who opposed repeal of a provision allowing senators to sue over phone records collected during the Arctic Frost investigation, and the lack of full-year DHS appropriations. Graham removed the hold in return for votes on legislation to criminalize refusal of state and local officials to cooperate with federal immigration enforcement, and to expand eligibility of those investigated by Jack Smith to sue the Department of Justice. On January 30, the bill passed the Senate 71–29.

Senate vote on passage (H.R. 7148)
Party	Votes for	Votes against	Not voting/Absent
Republican (53)	48	5: Ted Cruz; Ron Johnson; Mike Lee; Rand Paul; Rick Scott	—N/a
Democratic (45)	22	23	—N/a
Independent (2)	1: Angus King	1: Bernie Sanders	—N/a
Total (100)	71	29	—N/a

After passing the Senate, Speaker of House Mike Johnson said the House would not take up the bill until Monday, February 2, 2026. As a result, Office of Management and Budget said they would begin shutdown procedures at midnight on Saturday, January 31, when funding ran out. On February 3, the House passed the bill by a 217–214 vote. President Trump signed the bill into law later that day.

After the two-week DHS continuing resolution expired in mid-February, the Department of Homeland Security entered a prolonged partial shutdown. Senate Republicans repeatedly attempted to bring up H.R. 7147, but several cloture votes failed during February and March. On March 27, the Senate finally passed H.R. 7147 by voice vote after amending it. The House and Senate then spent roughly a month resolving differences, and on April 30, the House agreed to the Senate amendment by voice vote. President Trump signed it the same day.

=== Budget resolution and reconciliation bill ===
On April 23, the Senate passed a budget resolution for FY2026 (S.Con.Res. 33), in preparation for a reconciliation bill intended to end the shutdown by funding the Department of Homeland Security. On April 29, the House passed the resolution as well.

On June 5 the Senate passed the Secure America Act reconciliation bill (S. 2) by a 52–47 vote after an eighteen-hour vote-a-rama. The act originally included funding for a White House State Ballroom which was dropped. The Senate voted (50-49) against an amendment to block "Anti-Weaponization Fund". The bill appropriated almost US$70 billion including $5 billion to the Secretary of the Department of Homeland Security and over $38.5 billion for ICE and $26 billion for US Customs and Border Protection, through 2029. The law also increased spending on defense and homeland security. During the fiscal year, additional military funding was requested amid the conflict with Iran. In July, Defense Secretary Pete Hegseth said that the conflict had cost $37.5 billion, including costs already incurred and anticipated expenses through September 30. The bill passed the House on June 9 (214-212) and was signed by President Trump on June 10, 2026; 5 months ago.
