= Motion to vacate =

A motion to vacate may refer to either:

- A legal motion seeking vacatur of a judgment or other ruling
- A motion to vacate the chair, seeking removal of a legislative body's presiding officer
