= Removal of Kevin McCarthy as Speaker of the House =

2023 removal of the 55th speaker of the U.S. House of Representatives

Removal of Kevin McCarthy
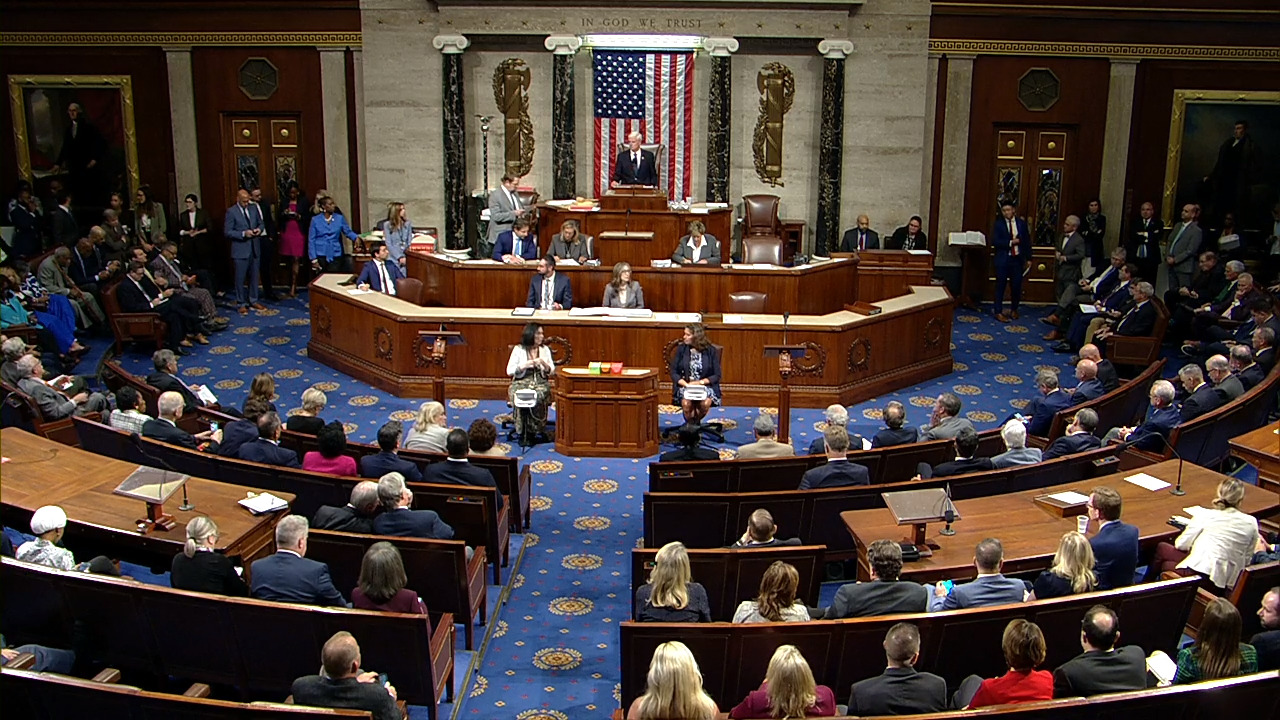
- The House of Representatives votes to remove McCarthy.
- Date: October 3, 2023; 3 years ago
- Cause: Republican opposition to H.R. 5860, a federal budget continuing resolution put forward by Kevin McCarthy (who relied on Democratic votes to get it passed); McCarthy accusing the Democratic Party of attempting to obstruct passage of the bill; General distrust in McCarthy's approach to leadership
- Motive: Motion to vacate the chair introduced by Rep. Matt Gaetz
- Outcome: Removal of McCarthy as Speaker; Appointment of Patrick McHenry as Speaker pro tempore; Election of Mike Johnson as Speaker of the House on October 25
- Voting summary: 216 voted for; 210 voted against; 7 absent

On October 3, 2023, the United States House of Representatives voted to remove its speaker, Kevin McCarthy of California, through a motion to vacate (Note: "Motion to vacate" is the informal name used to describe a resolution declaring the office of Speaker of the House of Representatives to be vacant.) filed by Representative Matt Gaetz of Florida, a fellow member of the Republican Party. McCarthy's removal marked the first time in American history that a speaker of the House was removed through a motion to vacate. The vacancy started a process to elect a speaker that began following an eight-day recess.

In the 118th Congress, the 2022 elections formed a narrow majority for Republicans in the House of Representatives. The Freedom Caucus, the most conservative congressional caucus of Republican representatives, secured a minority of these seats. During the speakership election for the 118th Congress, McCarthy faced significant opposition within the Republican Conference from the Freedom Caucus, who saw him as untrustworthy and insufficiently conservative. After fifteen rounds of voting, McCarthy was elected speaker, conceding to his opponents by allowing any representative to file a motion to vacate. The potential of a government shutdown began to take hold in July 2023, with the Freedom Caucus—in demonstrations of austerity and defiance toward McCarthy—opposing spending bills to fund the government.

By September, the federal government appeared poised to shut down. The Freedom Caucus furthered its warnings to McCarthy: they warned him against brokering a deal with Democrats to pass temporary appropriations legislation, asking him to pass an all-year budget with deep spending cuts instead. McCarthy nevertheless led the House of Representatives in passing a continuing resolution on September 30; its passage was reliant on bipartisan support, but more Democrats than Republicans voted in favor. On October 2, Gaetz, a member of the Freedom Caucus, filed a motion to vacate.

Following an unsuccessful motion to table by Representative Tom Cole, Republican Chair of the Rules Committee, Republican representatives debated McCarthy's speakership on the House floor. When the time for debate expired, the House voted to remove McCarthy, with insurgent Republicans and all Democrats present voting against him. The speaker's chair was vacated and Patrick McHenry of North Carolina—a McCarthy ally—was made speaker pro tempore and the House went without a proper speaker until the October 25 election of Mike Johnson of Louisiana. McCarthy subsequently announced his resignation from Congress effective at the end of 2023.

== Process and replacement ==
The speaker of the House can be removed using a motion to vacate. As part of negotiations for McCarthy's speakership, rules were adopted that allowed any single representative to initiate a motion to vacate (without needing any co-sponsors). The motion takes the form of a simple resolution. The provision had only been used twice in the House of Representatives. In 1910, an unsuccessful motion was filed against Joseph G. Cannon. In 2015, Representative Mark Meadows proposed a motion to vacate against then-speaker John Boehner, but a vote was not officially called before Boehner resigned. A representative must file the resolution and request a vote; as a privileged resolution, the vote must occur within two legislative days. A vote may be blocked if the resolution is tabled or sent to a committee. If passed, an internal list penned by McCarthy would appoint a speaker pro tempore until a new speaker was named. An election would then begin.

== Background ==
=== McCarthy's speakership ===
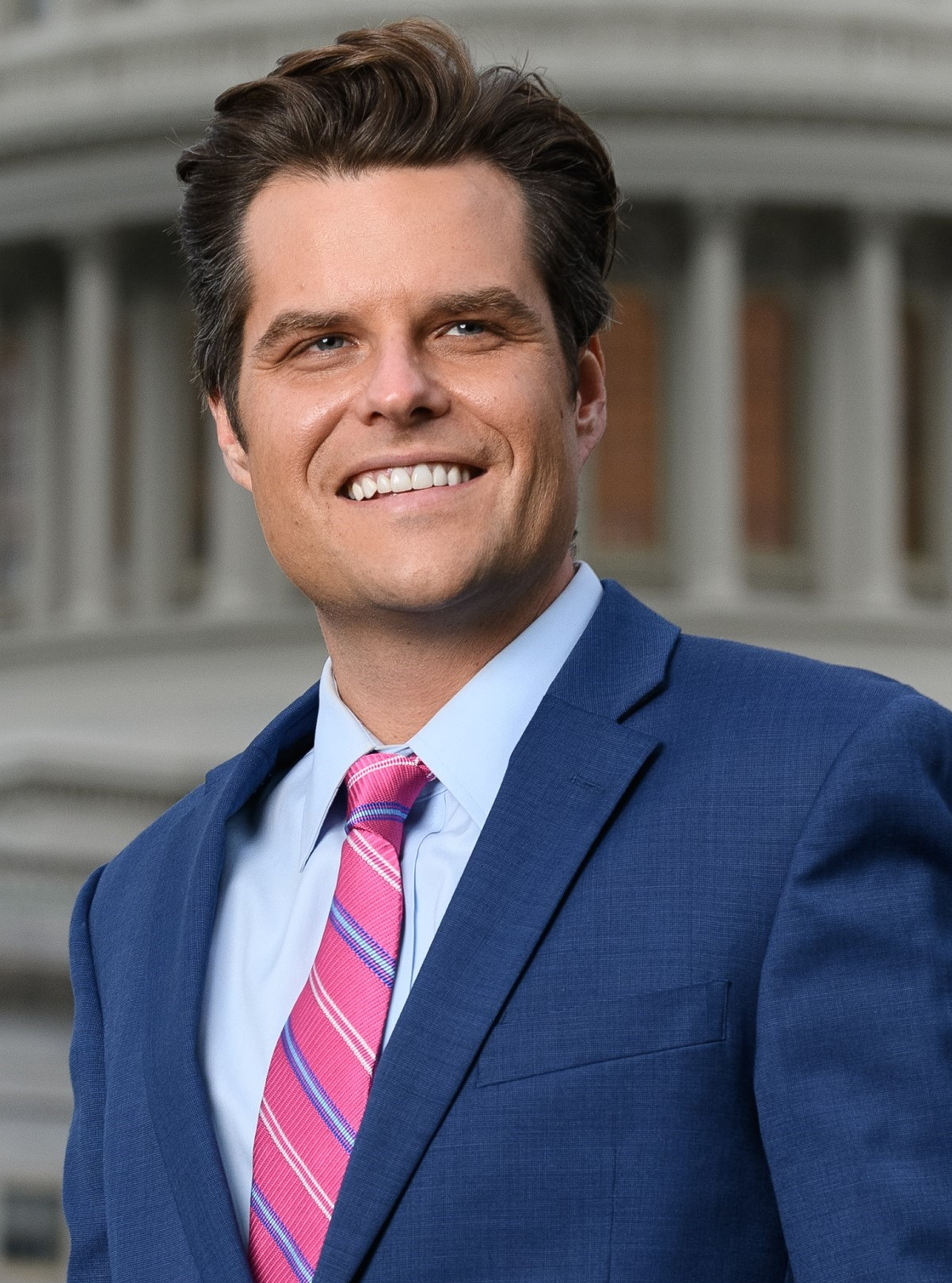
Representative Matt Gaetz led resistance to Kevin McCarthy and successfully filed a motion to recall him.

The 2022 midterm elections resulted in a narrow, 2-seat Senate majority for the Democratic Party and a narrow, 4-seat House of Representatives majority for the Republican Party. In the 118th Congress, the Freedom Caucus, a right wing congressional caucus, secured 45 House of Representatives seats. McCarthy, leader of the House Republican Conference, was elected speaker of the House after several days of voting as opposition—primarily led by members of the Freedom Caucus—mounted against him. McCarthy conceded to his opponents to negotiate their support for his speakership. In May 2023, McCarthy negotiated with President Joe Biden on a deal to resolve a debt-ceiling crisis and an imminent debt default. In response, Republicans, led by Gaetz, balked and blocked consideration of a bill protecting gas stoves against federal regulations. The mutiny left McCarthy with a political quagmire to either acquiesce to the insurgents, passing legislation that would face resistance in the Democratic-controlled Senate, or to negotiate with House Democrats, contending with a potential ousting.

=== Passage of a continuing resolution on the federal budget ===
By September, the federal government appeared poised to shut down after representatives could not vote on a series of appropriations bills. The Freedom Caucus threatened to depose McCarthy if he passed legislation which did not include the budget reforms they wanted, relying on Democrats to pass a bipartisan funding resolution instead. On September 29, Politico reported that Gaetz had reached out to Congressional Progressive Caucus chair Pramila Jayapal, among other Democrats, about removing McCarthy. The following day, hours before a shutdown was expected to occur, the House of Representatives passed H.R. 5860, a continuing resolution to fund the government through November 17, which extended current funding to Federal Departments without enacting any meaningful reform; the resolution was passed in the Senate and signed by President Biden, averting a shutdown. McCarthy had relied on Democratic votes to pass the continuing resolution due to opposition from some House Republicans. The resolution passed the House 335–91, with all but one of the votes cast against it coming from Republicans. Gaetz, who had led intra-party opposition to McCarthy, announced in an interview with CNN that he would move to remove McCarthy: he criticized McCarthy for working with Democrats to pass a temporary spending bill without spending cuts, and for introducing the bill itself at the very last moment (leaving representatives with barely enough time to read it before voting on it). Gaetz and other hardline conservatives had previously voted against another continuing resolution containing spending reductions, arguing that the cuts did not go far enough. Their votes, combined with those of Democrats who opposed spending cuts altogether, had led to the proposal failing by a vote of 198 to 232.

Vote to pass H.R. 5860
Party	Yes	No	Not voting
Republican	126	90	5
Democratic	209	1	2
Percentage	78.6%	21.4%	—N/a
Total votes	✓ 335	91	7

== Motion to vacate ==
Resolved, That the office of Speaker of the House of Representatives is hereby declared to be vacant.

— The text of the motion to vacate filed by Matt Gaetz

On October 2, Gaetz filed a motion to vacate, forcing a vote on McCarthy's removal within two legislative days. Politico's Ryan Lizza speculated that if McCarthy had retained his position, Gaetz might have simply proposed additional motions to vacate, as there is no limit on the number of times a member can do so.

=== House Democratic Caucus consensus ===
Many Democrats would cite an inability to trust McCarthy as motivating House Democrats to vote as a unified bloc in support of the motion to vacate. There was also little on McCarthy's agenda that appealed to Democrats on a legislative level. Despite relying on Democratic votes to pass the continuing resolution, after its passage, McCarthy had attacked Democrats in an interview aired on Face the Nation, accusing them of having attempted to obstruct its passage. These comments, amongst others, were seen as one of several instances in which he had established ill will and distrust among House Democrats during his speakership. Ahead of the removal vote, McCarthy publicly ruled out the possibility of a deal to receive votes for his retention from Democrats in exchange for concessions.

On October 3, prior to the vote, Democratic House Minority Leader Hakeem Jeffries asked Democrats to vote to remove McCarthy. The conclusion was that the pending motion to vacate highlighted the dysfunction in the Republican Party, which Democrats argued made Republicans unsuitable to govern. Representative Rosa DeLauro of Connecticut said, "[Republicans] need to work this out.... This is not for us to get involved."

=== Voting and debate ===
The motion to vacate was considered by the House on October 3. Tom Cole, chairman of the Republican-led House Rules Committee, unsuccessfully attempted to remove the matter from consideration by introducing a motion to table, which was however rejected by a vote of 218—208. Following one hour of debate evenly divided between Gaetz and Cole, the motion passed by a vote of 216–210; this was the first time in congressional history the House voted to remove its incumbent speaker.

== Results ==
=== Vote to table ===
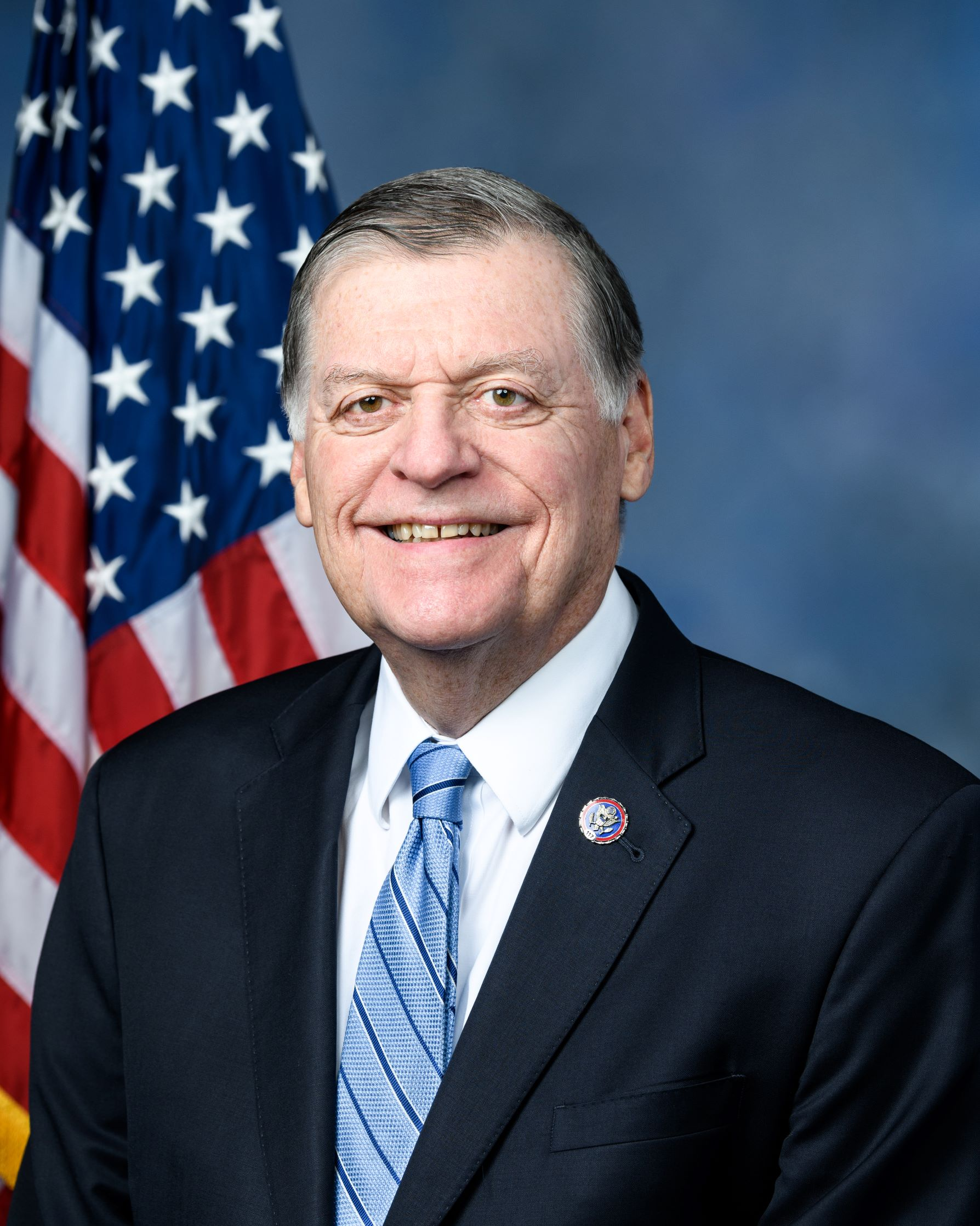
Representative Tom Cole's motion to table the motion to vacate was unsuccessful.

Vote to table
Party	Yes	No	Not voting
Republican	208	11	2
Democratic	—N/a	207	5
Percentage	48.8%	51.1%	—N/a
Total votes	208	✗ 218	7

The vote to table the motion was primarily split along party lines; all Democrats present voted against tabling the motion and a majority of Republicans voted to table the motion. Republicans Andy Biggs, Ken Buck, Tim Burchett, Eli Crane, Warren Davidson, Gaetz, Bob Good, Nancy Mace, Cory Mills, Matt Rosendale, and Victoria Spartz voted no.

=== Vote to vacate ===
Vote to vacate
Party	Yes	No	Not voting
Republican	8	210	3
Democratic	208	—N/a	4
Percentage	50.7%	49.3%	—N/a
Total votes	✓ 216	210	7

The vote to vacate was mostly split along party lines; all Democrats present voted yes and a majority of Republicans voted no. Republican representatives Biggs, Buck, Burchett, Crane, Gaetz, Good, Mace and Rosendale voted yes.

In the January speaker election, Biggs, Crane, Gaetz, Good and Rosendale had been five of six Republicans who had never voted for McCarthy (though they had all voted "present" on the last ballot, allowing McCarthy to be elected), while Buck, Burchett and Mace had voted for McCarthy on every ballot they had taken part in.

Burchett said his yes vote was "sealed" after McCarthy allegedly made a "condescending" remark about his religious beliefs during a phone call. McCarthy said that he did not intend to upset Burchett. Mace, who is a member of moderate caucuses such as the Republican Governance Group and Problem Solvers Caucus, defended her vote by citing unfulfilled promises McCarthy made regarding the future strategy of the Republican Conference towards gun violence and abortion. Buck cited similar broken promises regarding the budget. Jeffries and congressional Democrats said their yes votes were ultimately sealed by a video of "an appearance Mr. McCarthy made on television on Sunday—the morning after Democrats helped him push through legislation to avert a government shutdown — in which he blamed them for trying to prompt a shutdown."

=== Votes cast by members ===
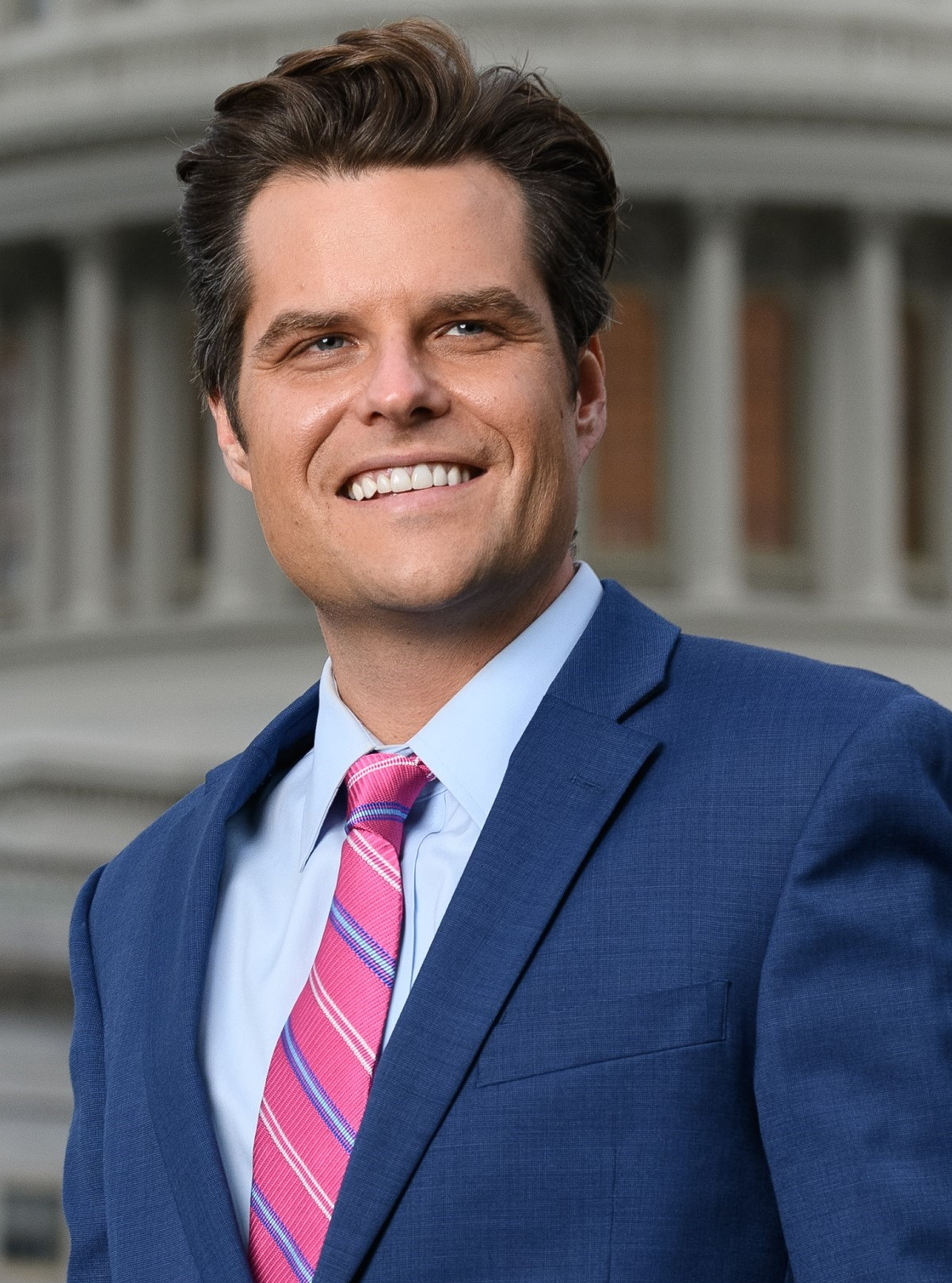
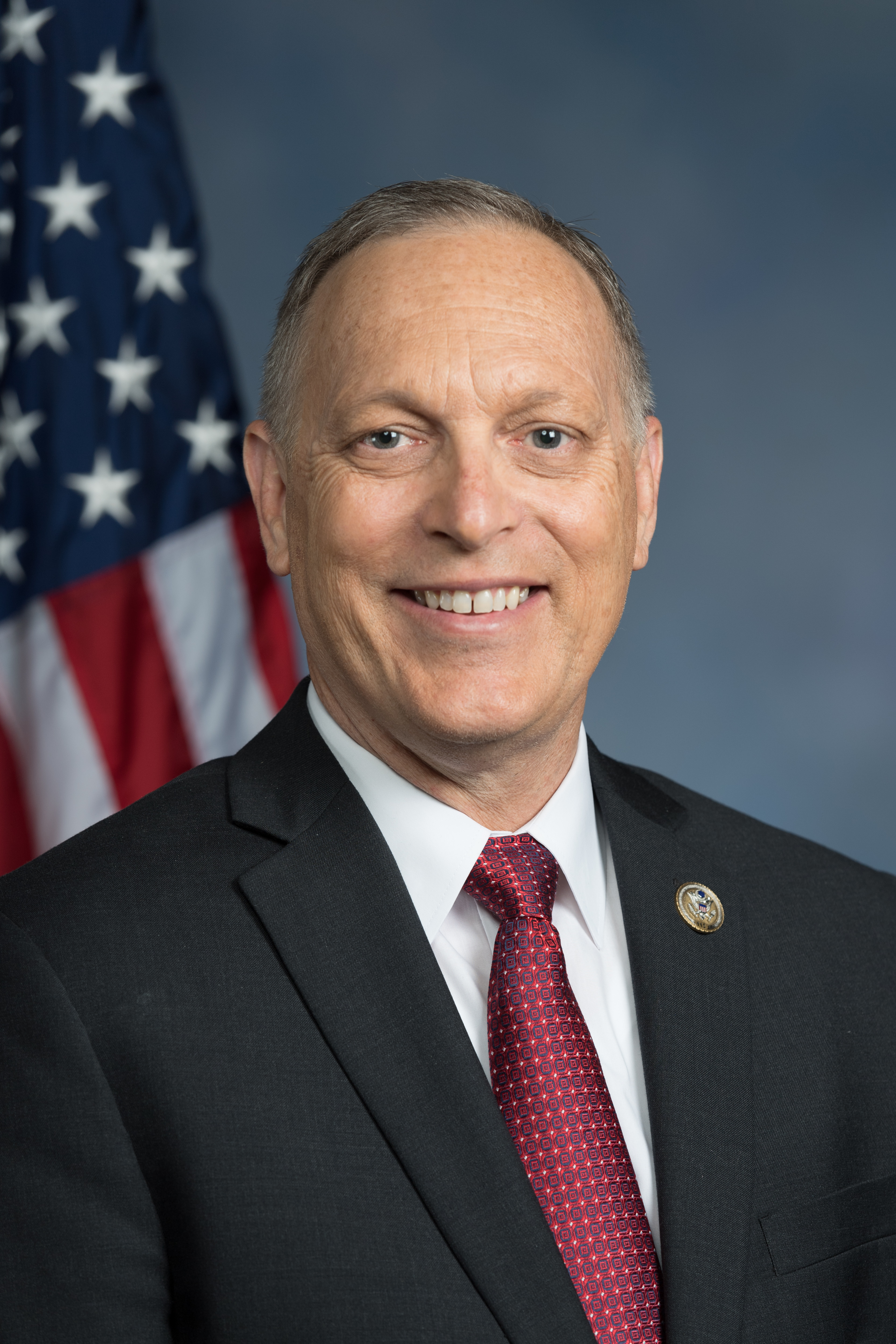
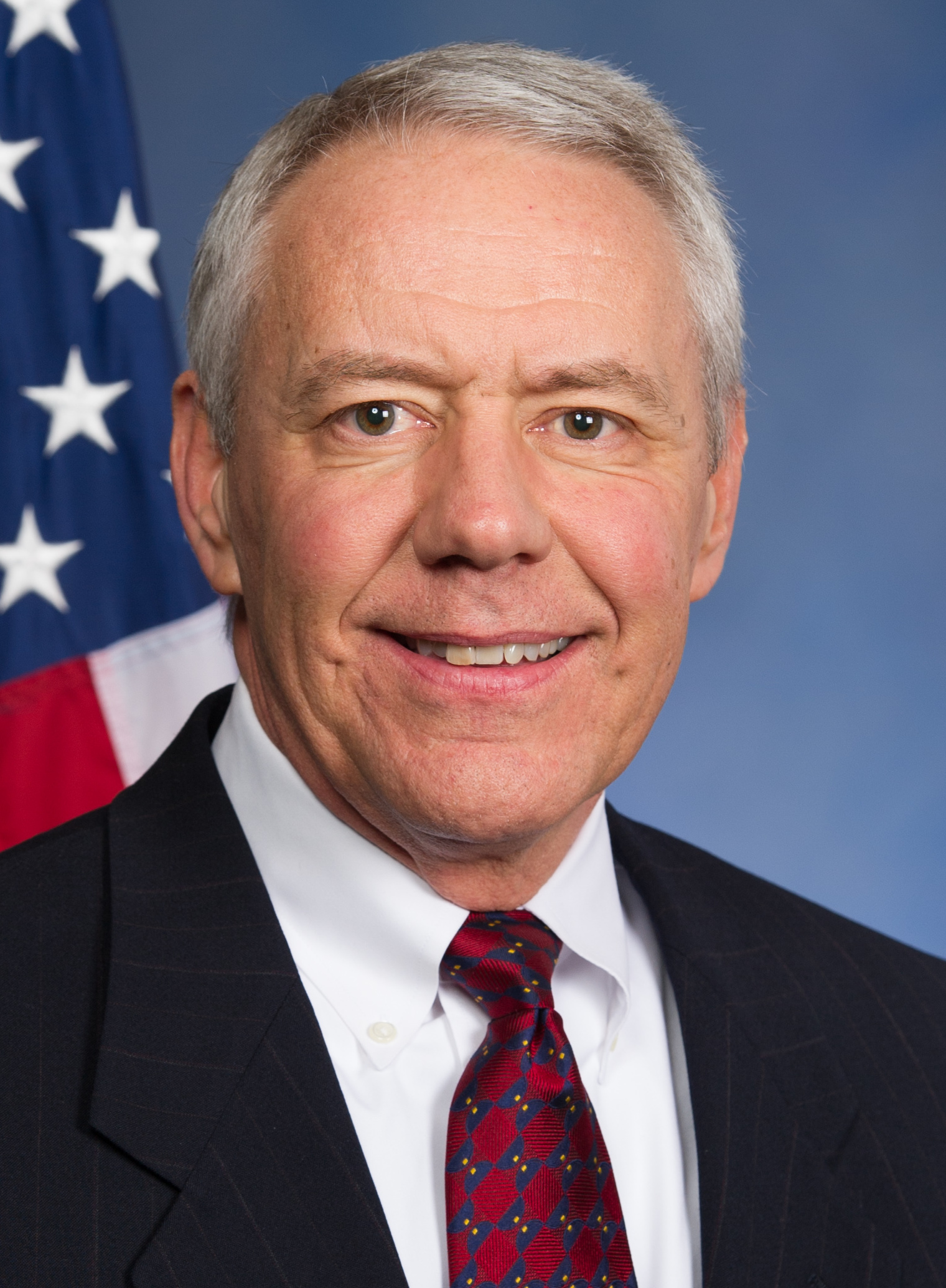
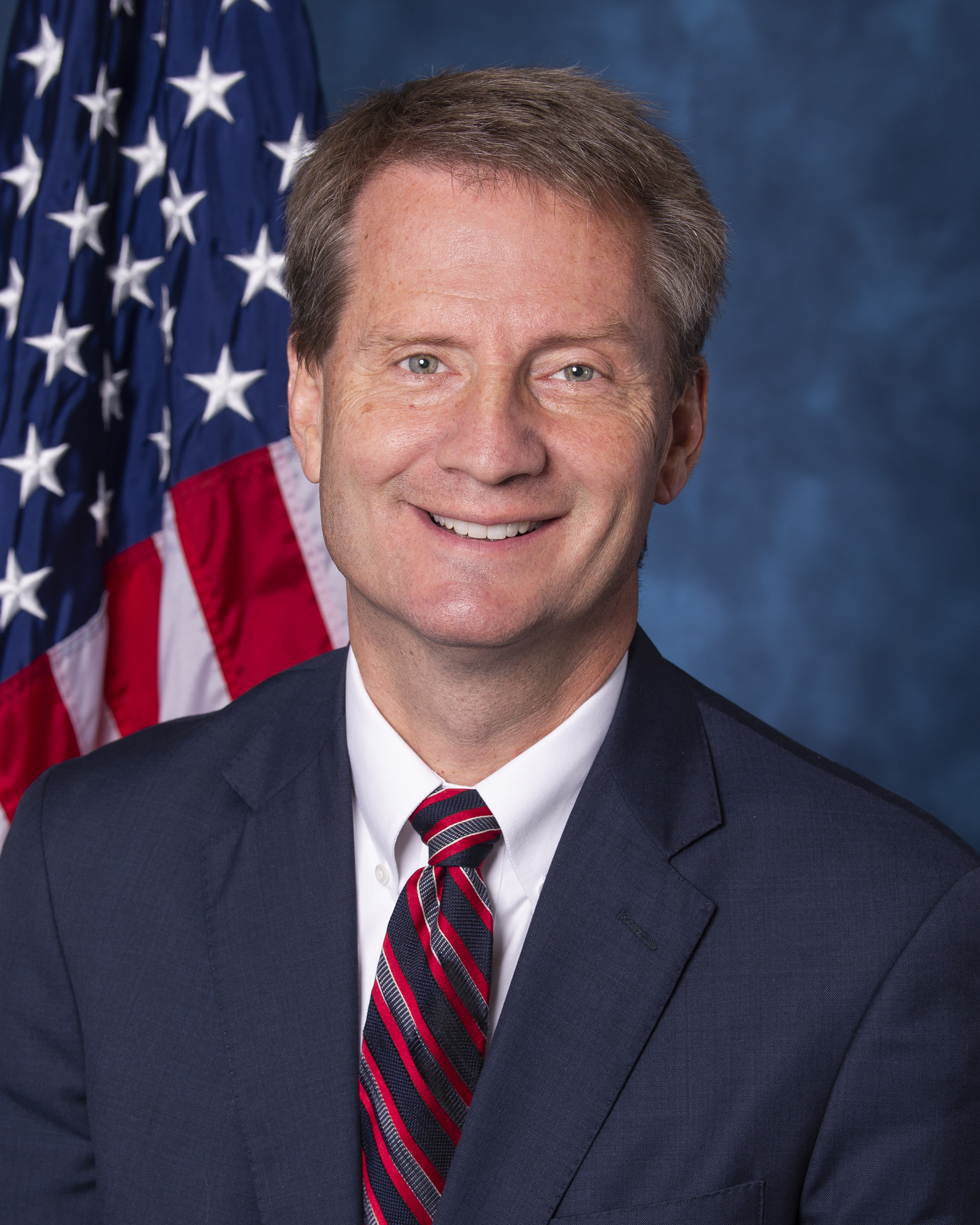
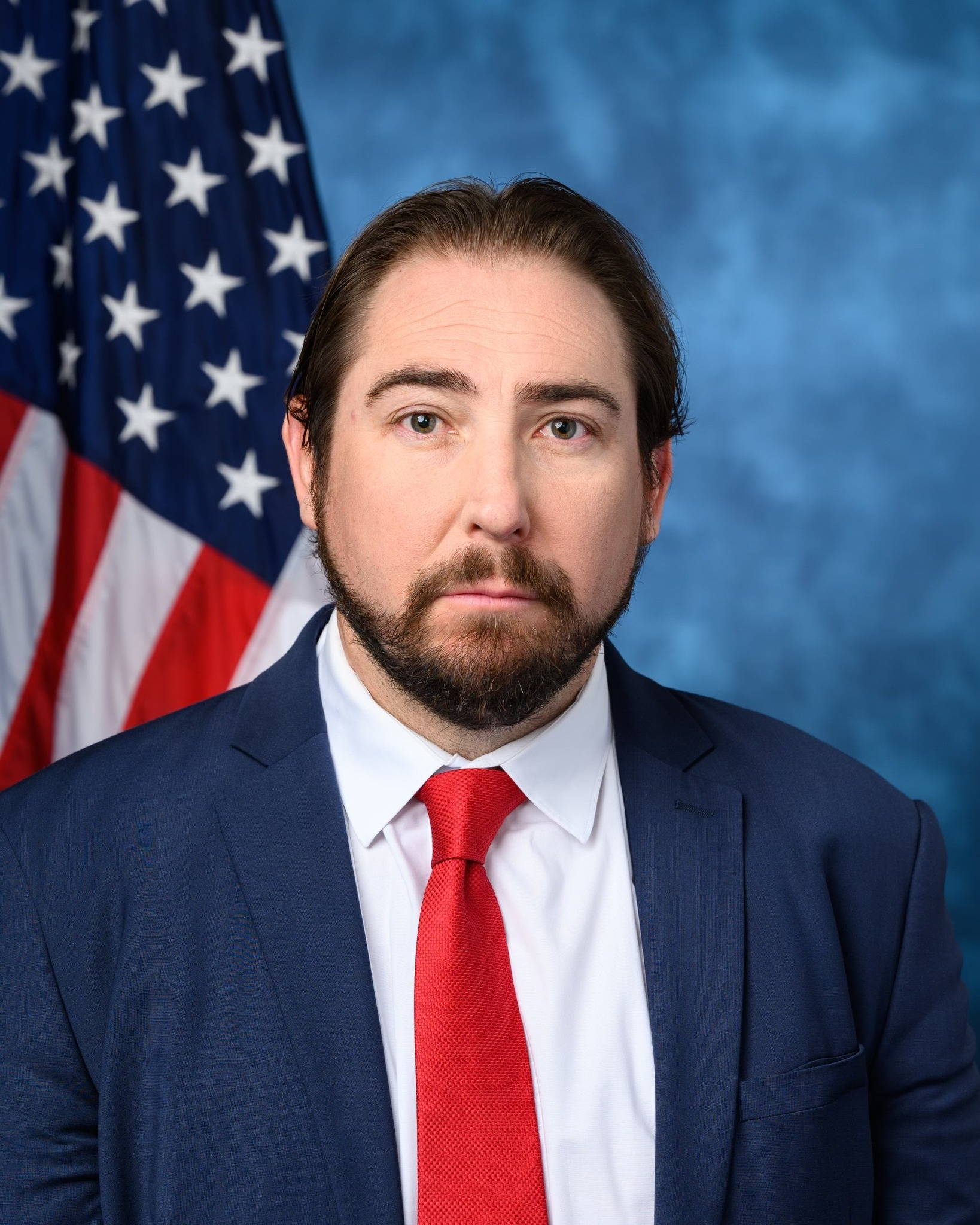
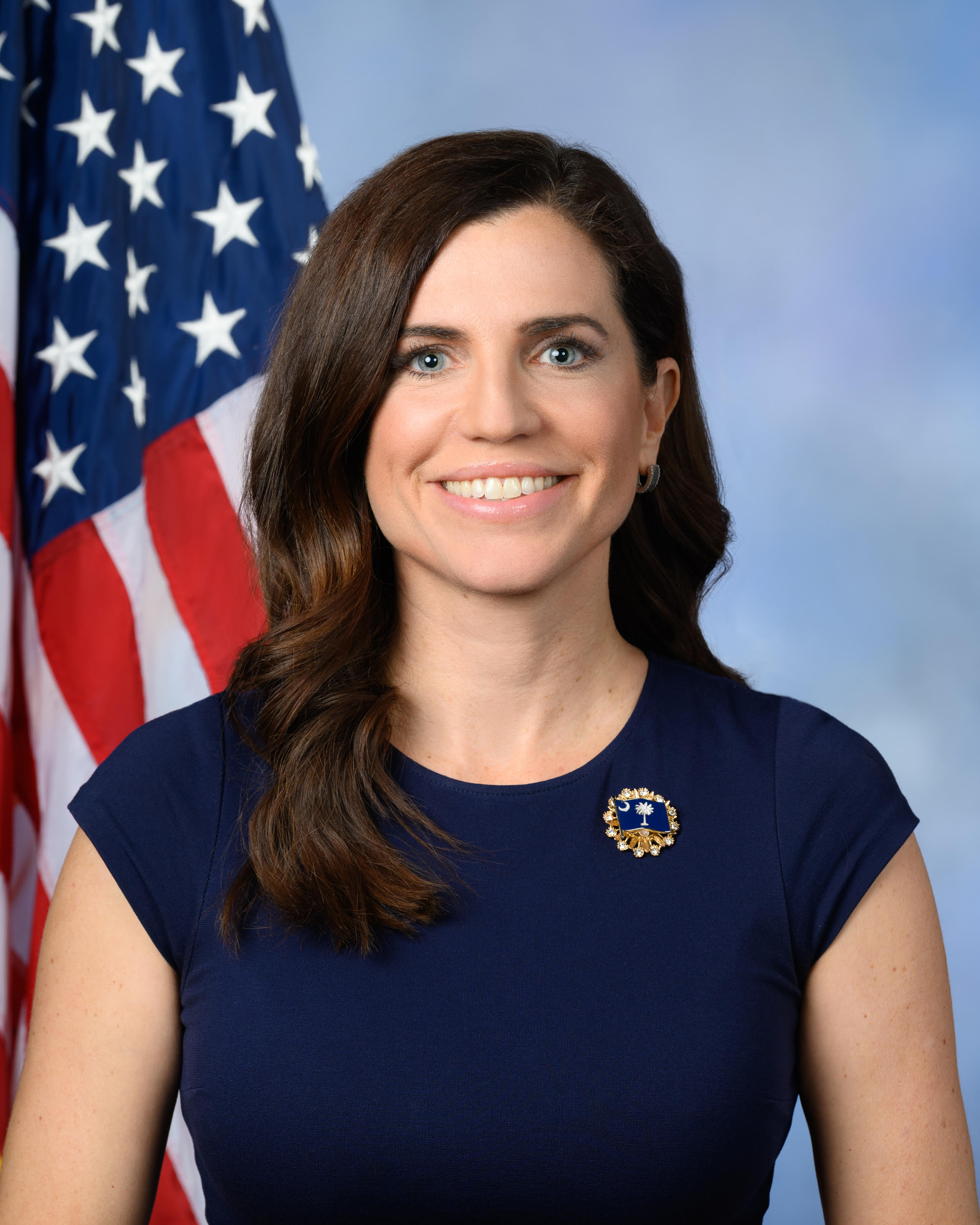
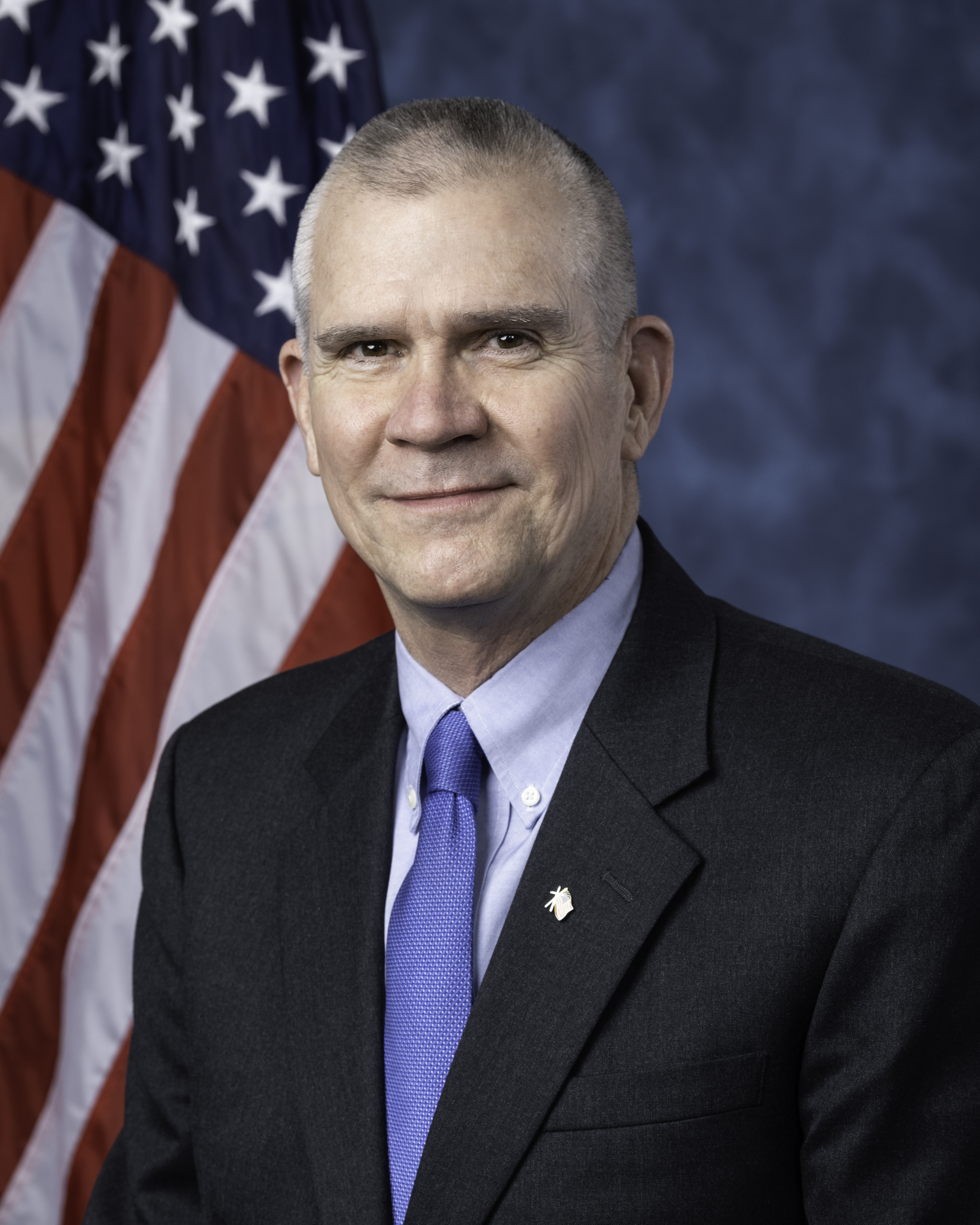
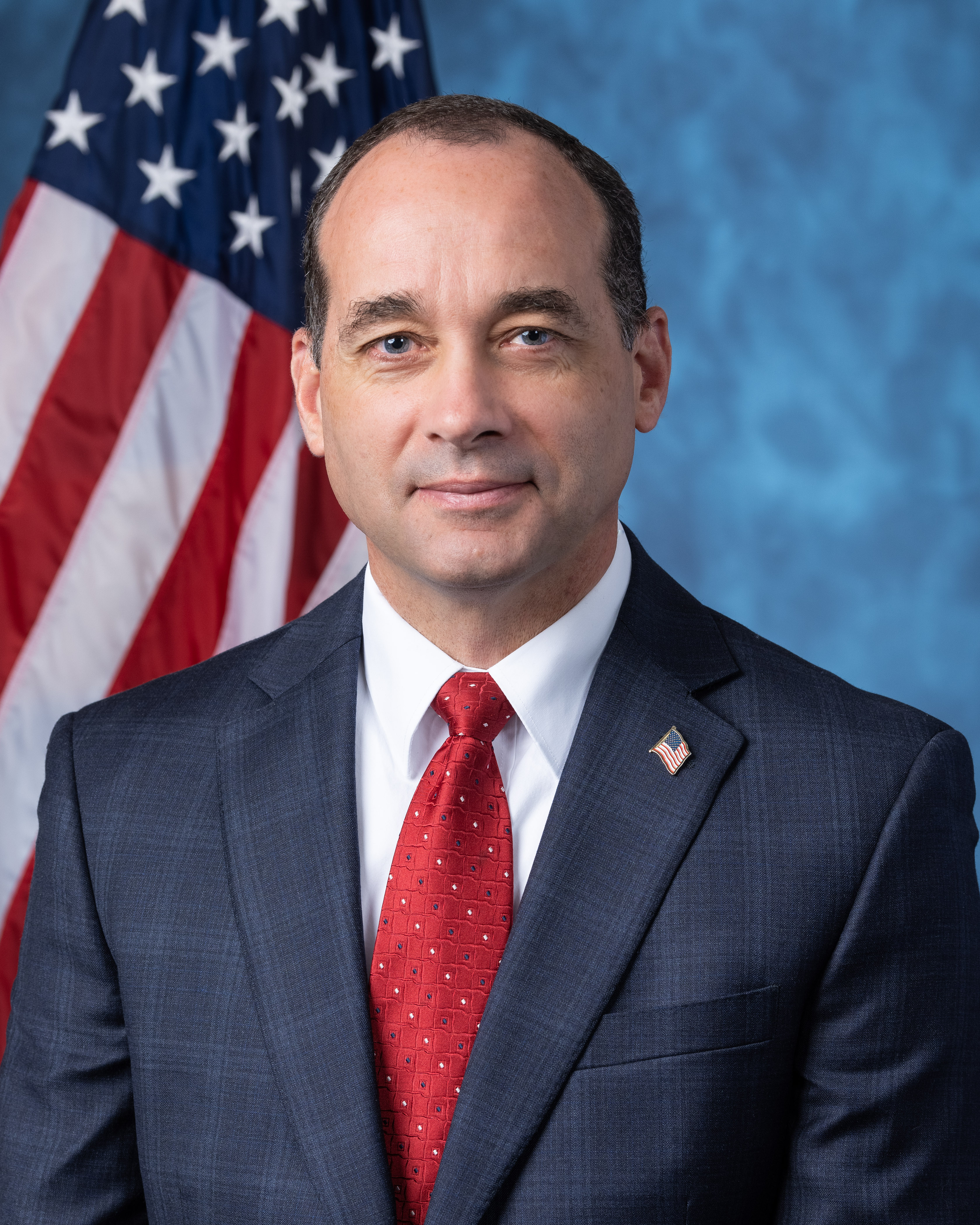
Eight Republican representatives (pictured) voted to vacate the office of Speaker of the House, along with all Democrats who were present.

All House members of the 118th Congress that voted against party lines or were absent for one or both votes, are noted here.

Member	Party	District	Vote to table	Vote to vacate
Andy Biggs	Republican	AZ 5	Against	Vacate
Ken Buck	Republican	CO 4	Against	Vacate
Tim Burchett	Republican	TN 2	Against	Vacate
Cori Bush	Democratic	MO 1	absent (Note: Missed due to medical procedure.)	
John Carter	Republican	TX 31	absent (Note: Missed for health reasons.)	
Eli Crane	Republican	AZ 2	Against	Vacate
Warren Davidson	Republican	OH 8	Against	Against
Matt Gaetz	Republican	FL 1	Against	Vacate
Bob Good	Republican	VA 5	Against	Vacate
Lance Gooden	Republican	TX 5	Table	absent
Anna Paulina Luna	Republican	FL 13	absent (Note: Missed on maternity leave.)	
Nancy Mace	Republican	SC 1	Against	Vacate
Cory Mills	Republican	FL 7	Against	Against
Nancy Pelosi	Democratic	CA 11	absent (Note: Missed due to attending the funeral of California Senator Dianne Feinstein.)	
Mary Peltola	Democratic	AK at-large	absent (Note: Missed due to attending the funeral of her husband Buzzy Peltola.)	
Matt Rosendale	Republican	MT 2	Against	Vacate
Victoria Spartz	Republican	IN 5	Against	Against
Emilia Sykes	Democratic	OH 13	absent (Note: Missed due to personal family matters.)	
Frederica Wilson	Democratic	FL 24	absent (Note: Missed en route back to the Capitol.)	Vacate

== Aftermath ==
North Carolina Representative McHenry, a described close ally of McCarthy, was appointed as his temporary replacement as speaker pro tempore of the House. The House's legislative activities were temporarily halted as speaker pro tempore McHenry began an eight-day recess.

Having assumed full authority over office space assignments as speaker pro tempore, McHenry asked former speaker Nancy Pelosi (a Democratic representative from California) to vacate her secondary office space in the Capitol. Maryland Representative Steny Hoyer, former house majority leader, also received a notice from Republican leadership to move out of his Capitol office space. Several outlets reported that McCarthy was behind the move, out of retribution for Democrats' refusal to support him during the vote. McCarthy continued to use the speaker's office during the vacancy of the speakership position.

=== Selection of a new speaker ===
Following his removal, McCarthy announced that he would not seek reelection as Speaker, leaving an open race to fill the office. This left the House Republicans in a state of uncertainty, as there was no apparent successor to lead the House Republican majority. Less than a week after McCarthy's ouster, Israel — one of the United States' closest allies — was attacked by the militant group Hamas, which began the Gaza war. McCarthy's ouster and the subsequent leadership debacle have been cited as the main reasons behind a failure for an aid package to be passed in support of Israel. Some McCarthy supporters attempted to use the crisis to reinstall McCarthy as speaker, but these efforts failed. Gaetz said that he did not intend to run for speakership himself. Steve Scalise (House majority leader) had been discussed as a potential new speaker, and when the Republican Conference convened on October 10 to select its nominee for speaker it nominated Scalise. However, he withdrew the next day, before any floor vote.

Jim Jordan was next selected as a new Republican conference nominee, but was dropped by the conference after thrice failing to win a vote in the House floor votes. After Jordan's nomination failed, Tom Emmer was nominated next by the Republican conference, but withdrew hours after determining there was no way to convert 25 holdouts. Before McCarthy's removal, several members of the Freedom Caucus—including Representative Andy Biggs reportedly had intended to coalesce around Emmer as a replacement speaker due to his conservative values (at the time, Emmer himself said he had "zero interest in palace intrigue"). However, by the day of his nomination, over half the holdouts were from the Freedom Caucus.

Louisiana representative and Republican conference Vice Chair Mike Johnson was nominated on October 24 and elected on October 25 in a 220-209 vote, defeating Democrat Hakeem Jeffries. Every representative present voted for their party's nominee.

=== Later efforts by 118th Congress efforts to vacate the speakership ===
On November 14, Speaker Mike Johnson ushered the passage of a stop-gap spending bill to avert a government shutdown in a 336–96 vote. Similarly to McCarthy before his ouster, Johnson relied upon the votes of Democrats to accomplish this (with 209 Democrats and 127 Republicans voting for the bill, while 94 Republicans and 2 Democrats voted against it). No immediate effort rose to oust Johnson over this action, including when he did so again in January 2024. However, after two minibus spending bills passed in March 2024, Marjorie Taylor Greene announced she would file a motion to oust Johnson. On May 8, 2024, Greene made the motion to vacate against Mike Johnson privileged, forcing it onto the floor. The motion was immediately met with a successful vote to table by Steve Scalise supported by a bipartisan legislative coalition.

== Responses ==
=== McCarthy ===
Press conference by McCarthy following his removal

McCarthy declared, "I fought for what I believe in. I believe I can continue to fight, but maybe in a different manner." In a press conference following his removal, McCarthy blamed Democrats. He argued that Democrats should have voted against the motion to vacate to protect the institution. McCarthy also said that Pelosi had promised him that Democrats would support McCarthy during a motion to vacate. He later left Congress at the end of 2023, but continued to influence the political sphere with his renowned fundraising network; specifically, recruiting and funding challengers to the eight Representatives who ousted him.

=== Republican Party ===
Former vice president Mike Pence said, "Chaos is never America's strength, and it's never a friend of American families that are struggling." Former Speaker of the House Newt Gingrich said that Gaetz was "actively destructive to the conservative movement." Gingrich also said that House Republicans should expel Gaetz. Some Republicans blamed Democrats for not supporting McCarthy. Republican members of the bipartisan Problem Solvers Caucus threatened to quit the caucus after Democrats voted. The National Republican Congressional Committee called Democrats the "Chaos Caucus," a term originally coined to describe far-right Republicans.

Adolfo Franco, a lawyer and Republican Party strategist, speaking from Florida, told Al Jazeera that it was a "five-seat majority in a divided government" that removed McCarthy. "The reality is we have a democratic President, and a democratic Senate [sic]. We don’t have absolute majorities. Mr. Gaetz is living in a fantasy world. So I feel terrible for a man who has accomplished so much for our country to be ousted," Franco said.

Statement from 45 Republican members of the House condemning McCarthy's removal

Forty-five Republican representatives wrote an open letter objecting to the McCarthy ejection from his position as speaker. The letter said the representatives were "ashamed and embarrassed by what happened", and praised McCarthy's performance as "one of the most accomplished Republican leaders in modern history".

=== Democratic Party ===
On October 4, Jeffries released a statement wishing McCarthy well and saying that he and McCarthy "had a respectful, communicative, and forward-looking relationship."

== Analysis ==
The Washington Post political contributor Dan Balz speculated that the ousting of McCarthy could hurt Republicans during the 2024 elections. Republicans did retain their majority in the 2024 United States House of Representatives elections, but their majority narrowed to just 220-215, despite winning the White House and flipping the Senate.

Political observers have noted a historical parallel between the turmoil engulfing the House Republican Conference surrounding McCarthy's removal and the events following the resignation of Newt Gingrich precipitated by an internal caucus rebellion in the wake of the 1998 elections. The lead-up to the 106th United States Congress was marked by significant events, including the 1998 bombing of Iraq and the impeachment of Bill Clinton; during this turbulent period, Bob Livingston was briefly the presumptive speaker before he, too, resigned, with then-little-known Dennis Hastert ultimately becoming speaker on January 6, 1999.

== See also ==
- October 2015 Speaker of the United States House of Representatives election
- Yaroslav Hunka scandal, which caused Canadian Speaker of the House Anthony Rota to resign within the same week
