= 2024 United States federal budget =

US budget from October 1, 2023, to September 30, 2024

2024 Budget of the United States federal government
- Country: United States
- Total revenue: $4.919 trillion (actual) 17.1% of GDP
- Total expenditures: $6.752 trillion (actual) 23.4% of GDP
- Deficit: $1.833 trillion (actual); 6.4% of GDP

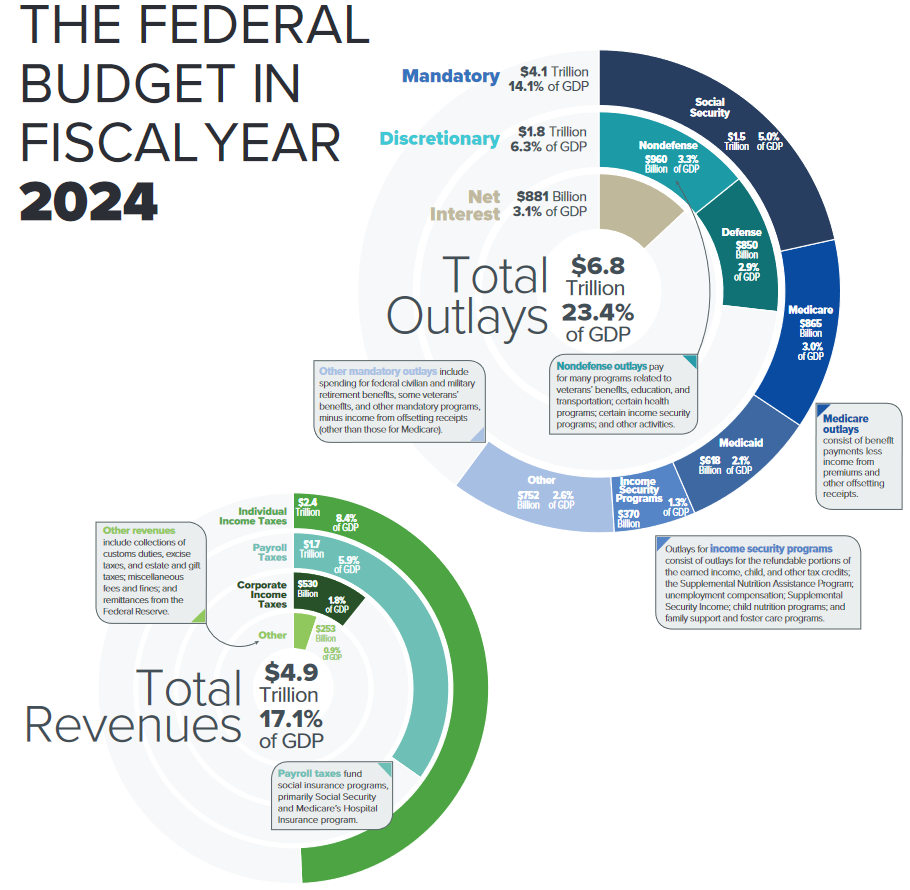
Federal Revenue and Spending

The United States federal budget for fiscal year 2024 ran from October 1, 2023, to September 30, 2024.

The negotiations for FY 2024 were particularly contentious. The 2023 United States debt-ceiling crisis led to the passage of the Fiscal Responsibility Act of 2023, which capped discretionary spending in FY2024 and FY2025. Later, disagreements over the passage of an initial continuing resolution caused the removal of Kevin McCarthy as speaker and replacement with Mike Johnson. The process also saw repeated unsuccessful attempts to pass legislation by a straight party-line vote without minority involvement, which is unusual in American politics; however, there were also a few instances where the minority party supported a procedural rule vote, which is also unusual.

The federal government initially operated under a series of four temporary continuing resolutions that largely extended 2023 budget spending levels, as legislators were debating the specific provisions of the 2024 appropriations. The final appropriations were ultimately passed in a pair of bills approved in March 2024.

== Background ==
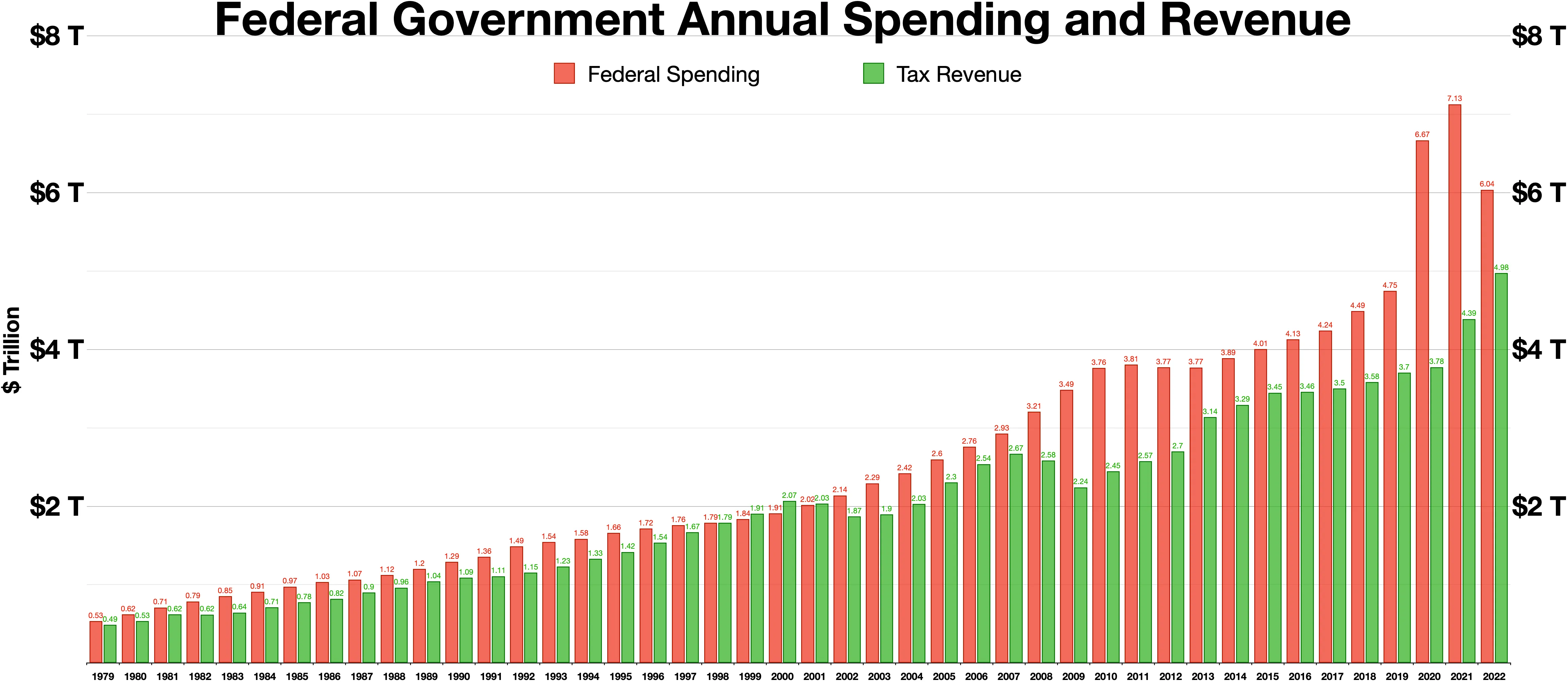
Federal Government annual spending and revenue Federal spending Tax revenue

Beginning after the 2010 Congressional elections, the fiscally conservative Tea Party movement within the Republican Party came to power in opposition to Obama-era increases in government spending, most visibly due to Obamacare and the Troubled Asset Relief Program (although the latter actually ended up providing a profit to the federal government). This led to the formation of the Freedom Caucus in January 2015 by a group of conservatives and Tea Party movement members, with the aim of pushing the Republican leadership to the right.

The 2022 midterm elections resulted in a narrow Democratic Party majority in the U.S. Senate and a narrow majority for the Republican Party in the House of Representatives for the 118th Congress. The Freedom Caucus congressional caucus secured 45 House seats. Kevin McCarthy, leader of the House Republican Conference, was elected speaker of the House following several days after an unprecedented 15 ballots following opposition in the Republican caucus, primarily led by members of the Freedom Caucus. In order to secure the speakership, McCarthy was forced to make concessions to opponents including allowing any single member of Congress to trigger a motion to vacate. Members of the Freedom Caucus were also given influential committee positions, including three on the Rules Committee. With four Democrats as the minority members, that meant any bill that the Freedom Caucus strongly opposed could be blocked from advancement to the floor, as three votes against would result in a 7-7 tie and a defeated motion.

== Budget legislation ==
The Biden administration budget proposal was released in March 2023.

During the 2023 United States debt-ceiling crisis, McCarthy was forced to negotiate with Democratic President Joe Biden in order to resolve the crisis with a bill that would pass the Democrat controlled United States Senate and would not be vetoed. Economists said it would be "catastrophic" if the debt ceiling was not raised. The negotiations resulted in the bipartisan Fiscal Responsibility Act of 2023, which capped discretionary spending in FY2024 and FY2025, and increased work requirements for SNAP recipients.

The deal was opposed by members of the House Freedom Caucus who believed that the bill was not conservative enough. Two members of the Freedom Caucus voted with Democrats in an attempt to block the act in the Rules Committee, but failed by one vote. On May 31, in a procedural rule vote on the House floor, which historically is supported by all members of the majority party and opposed by minority members regardless of their position on the underlying bill, 29 conservative Republicans opposed the vote. In order to ensure the bill's passage, Democratic Leader Hakeem Jeffries held up a green card to alert Democrats they could vote in favor of the measure, resulting in 52 Democrats showing their support for the procedural vote. A majority of both the Republican and Democratic parties voted for final passage of the Fiscal Responsibility Act of 2023, but more Republicans (71) voted against the bill than Democrats (46).

Following the passage of the Fiscal Responsibility Act, 11 angry members of the Freedom Caucus voted with Democrats to block a procedural rules vote on a Republican bill that would hinder the federal government's ability to regulate gas stoves. Freedom Caucus members said the vote was a protest of McCarthy's handling of the debt-ceiling crisis. On June 12, 2023, the Freedom Caucus and McCarthy reached an agreement that resulted in the Freedom Caucus not blocking procedural votes in exchange for conservative legislation being brought to the floor.

== Continuing resolutions ==
=== Summer 2023 shutdown concerns ===
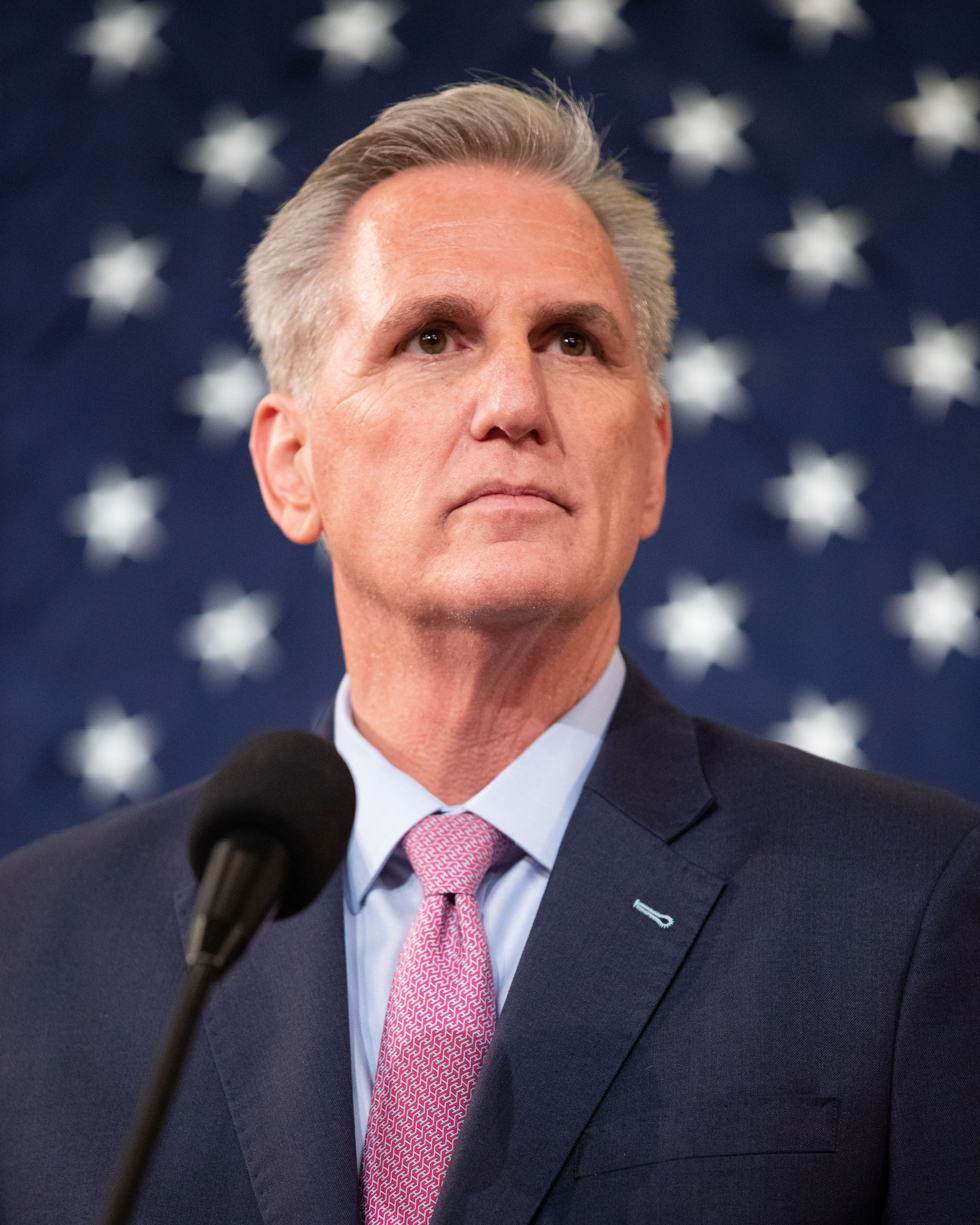
Opposition to Kevin McCarthy served as the impetus to the potential shutdown.

Negotiations for funding the federal government for the 2024 fiscal year began in July, with Republicans demanding to cut government spending. Rosa DeLauro, the ranking member of the House Committee on Appropriations, stated that Republican opposition would ultimately result in a government shutdown. The Senate Committee on Appropriations remained committed to securing a deal according to ranking members Patty Murray and Susan Collins.

In a show of austerity, members of the Freedom Caucus threatened to refuse to hold a vote on two spending bills supported by McCarthy in July 2023; representative Bob Good stated that members should not "fear a government shutdown". Republicans in the House of Representatives abandoned efforts to fund the Department of Agriculture and Food and Drug Administration (FDA) that month but narrowly passed a bill to fund veterans programs and military construction projects. In particular, Republicans sought to include language that reversed an FDA ruling allowing the oral abortion pill mifepristone to be sold in retail pharmacies. In August, Trump was federally indicted for attempting to overturn the 2020 presidential election, further complicating efforts to fund the Federal Bureau of Investigation and the Department of Justice. Senate Majority Leader Chuck Schumer agreed to a temporary spending bill with McCarthy to avert a shutdown that month. McCarthy argued that a shutdown could prevent the House Committee on Oversight and Accountability from investigating the Biden family, but some Republicans remained dismissive.

House Republicans began considering a temporary bill to fund the government on September 17, but were met with opposition from within the party. However, by then the federal government appeared poised to shut down. The Freedom Caucus stated its opposition to any bill that would not include a border measure that revives Trump-era policies, including constructing the Trump border wall, detaining asylum seekers for longer, and deporting unaccompanied minors, while many hardliners maintained their oppositions to any continuing resolutions to keep the government open. Despite the earlier agreement, in September 2023, Freedom Caucus members once again began joining with Democrats to block procedural rule votes. On September 19 and September 21, five members of the Freedom Caucus, voted with Democrats to block a vote on a military funding bill. Additionally, some hardliners threatened to depose McCarthy if he turned to Democrats to gather more votes. Bowing to resistance, McCarthy pulled a Pentagon funding bill that month. In spite of these actions, McCarthy remained optimistic and appeased his opponents.

=== September 2023 continuing resolution ===
Continuing Appropriations Act, 2024 and Other Extensions Act
- Long title: An act making continuing appropriations for fiscal year 2024, and for other purposes.
- Enacted by: the 118th United States Congress

Citations
- Public law: Pub. L. 118–15 (text) (PDF)

Legislative history
- Introduced in the House as H.R. 5860 by Kay Granger (R–TX) on September 30, 2023; Passed the House on September 30, 2023 (335–91); Passed the Senate on September 30, 2023 (88–9); Signed into law by President Joe Biden on September 30, 2023

On September 26, the Senate reached a tentative spending deal for a temporary continuing resolution to fund the government through November, but the bill would not be able to pass before a shutdown due to a filibuster by Senator Rand Paul over aid to Ukraine. McCarthy opposed the deal, telling his conference that he would not put the Senate bill on the House floor. On September 29, twenty-one Freedom Caucus members joined with Democrats to block the continuing resolution which included spending cuts and immigration restrictions, by a vote of 198—232. Far-right Republicans defied McCarthy, with Freedom Caucus members who voted against the resolution said they would not support a temporary spending bill under any circumstance.

In order to avert a government shutdown, McCarthy struck a deal with Democrats for a bipartisan continuing resolution that kept funding at 2023 levels but did not include aid to Ukraine. The bill was passed under suspension of the rules, which allowed McCarthy to bypass procedural rules votes but required a two-thirds majority to pass the resolution. The bill passed in a 335–91 vote, with 90 Republicans and 1 Democrat voting against it.

==== Aftermath: replacement of McCarthy with Johnson as speaker ====
Angry over the passing of the bipartisan continuing resolution, Republican representative Matt Gaetz on October 2 filed a motion to vacate the chair, forcing a vote on McCarthy's removal within two legislative days. It passed it passed 216–210, with 8 Republicans joining every Democrat to oust McCarthy from the speakership.

Afterwards, Republicans took 22 days to replace McCarthy, during which Freedom Caucus members refused to support the conference nominations of Steve Scalise and then Tom Emmer while moderate Republicans refused to support the conference nomination of Jim Jordan. During this time, Patrick McHenry—a McCarthy ally—was made speaker pro tempore, and the House did not pass any legislation as it was obligated to resolve the speaker election. On October 7, the Gaza war broke out, and the House was also unable to pass any resolutions or military aid to Israel because of the lack of House leadership. During some of the GOP balloting discussions, proposals emerged for extending the CR to April 2024 and mandating a 1% across-the-board cut. Ultimately, Mike Johnson was elected Speaker of the House with unanimous support from the Republican conference, by a vote of 220–209.

Following the vote to oust McCarthy, Jeffries penned an opinion column in The Washington Post calling for a "bipartisan governing coalition" in which he pitched a path for consensus legislation that could not be blocked by a "small handful of extreme members" when large swaths of the House supported a bill. While a coalition was never officially formed, Democrats became crucial votes for several bills between the end of 2023 and September 2024.

=== November 2023 continuing resolution ===
Further Continuing Appropriations and Other Extensions Act, 2024
- Long title: An act making further continuing appropriations for fiscal year 2024, and for other purposes.
- Enacted by: the 118th United States Congress

Citations
- Public law: Pub. L. 118–22 (text) (PDF)

Legislative history
- Introduced in the House as H.R. 6363 by Kay Granger (R–TX) on November 13, 2023; Passed the House on November 14, 2023 (336–95); Passed the Senate on November 15, 2023 (87–11); Signed into law by President Joe Biden on November 17, 2023

Johnson implemented the strategy of passing individual appropriations, however only HR 4821, 4364 and 4394 passed the House before the budget deadline elapsed.

A second continuing resolution passed the House on November 14 with bipartisan support, with 93 Republicans and 2 Democrats voting against the resolution. The Senate passed the bill on November 15. It extended funding for four appropriations bills—Transportation/Housing and Urban Development, Military Construction/Veterans Affairs, Energy/Water, and Agriculture/Rural Development/Food and Drug Administration—until January 19, 2024, with the remaining bills extended until February 2.

The continuing resolution once again led to retaliation from Freedom Caucus members. On November 15, 19 Freedom Caucus members joined with Democrats to block a rule vote on a bill funding the Justice Department.

=== January 2024 continuing resolution ===
Further Additional Continuing Appropriations and Other Extensions Act, 2024
- Long title: An act making further continuing appropriations for fiscal year 2024, and for other purposes.
- Enacted by: the 118th United States Congress

Citations
- Public law: Pub. L. 118–35 (text) (PDF)

Legislative history
- Introduced in the House as H.R. 2872 by Garret Graves (R–LA) on April 26, 2023 (Note: H.R. 2872 was originally meant to be a relatively inconsequential bill providing for a minor amendment to the Permanent Electronic Duck Stamp Act of 2013; the bill passed the House in 2023, but was not initially acted upon by the Senate; in January 2024, the Senate passed the bill with an amendment which completely altered its content, turning it into a continuing appropriations act. This was done in order to circumvent the Origination Clause, which requires spending bills to start in the House.); Passed the House on September 20, 2023 (Passed voice vote); Passed the Senate on January 18, 2024 (77–18) with amendment; House agreed to Senate amendment on January 18, 2024 (314–108); Signed into law by President Joe Biden on January 19, 2024

Following the passage of the November continuing resolution, neither the House nor the Senate advanced any funding bills, as hardline Republicans successfully pushed Speaker Johnson to abandon the funding levels reached in the Fiscal Responsibility Act. On January 7, 2024, Senate Majority Leader Chuck Schumer and House Speaker Johnson agreed to a $1.59 trillion topline spending deal. The topline spending levels agreed for 2024 that was not substantially different from the deal McCarthy and President Biden had negotiated. Following the agreement, hardline Republicans again attempted to push Johnson to abandon the deal, essentially ensuring Democrats would be required to join Republicans to pass a finalized spending bill in the House.

On January 10, twelve Freedom Caucus members joined Democrats to block a rule vote on an unrelated bill about electric cars in protest of the spending deal. Conventionally, the majority party unanimously backs rules, while the minority party unanimously opposes them. Democrats decided they would continue to follow the convention in this instance and continue to vote against rules. This, combined with the House Freedom Caucus' determination to also oppose rules on any bill they did not support, caused Speaker Johnson to rely on suspension of rules procedures, which allow the immediate passage of a legislative proposal without the need for a rule vote, but required the support of two-thirds of the House. Democrats opted to vote in favor of suspension of the rules for budget legislation.

Several senior members of Congress indicated an interest in passing another continuing resolution into March to allow for more time to draw up funding bills aligned with the deal. The CR was passed on January 18, 2024, through a suspension of the rules, with 106 Republicans and two Democrats voting against it. The CR extended funding for the first four appropriations bills until March 1, with the remainder extended until March 8.

Later in January, the House passed a bipartisan Tax Bill, also through a suspension of the rules. Despite its bipartisan passage, the bill was opposed by both Progressive Democrats and the House Freedom Caucus.

=== March 2024 continuing resolution ===
Extension of Continuing Appropriations and Other Matters Act, 2024
- Long title: An act making further continuing appropriations for fiscal year 2024, and for other purposes.
- Enacted by: the 118th United States Congress

Citations
- Public law: Pub. L. 118–40 (text) (PDF)

Legislative history
- Introduced in the House as H.R. 7463 by Kay Granger (R–TX) on February 28, 2024; Passed the House on February 29, 2024 (320–99); Passed the Senate on March 1, 2024 (77–13); Signed into law by President Joe Biden on March 1, 2024

On February 13, the Senate took their scheduled break until the 26th, and the House designated the 15th through to the 27th as a district work period. This combination meant that all appropriations bills would need to be passed in the three days between the reconvening and first deadlines.

On February 29, the House passed a short-term continuing resolution extending the funding deadline to March 8 for the first four appropriations bills in the November and January CRs, and to March 22 for the rest. The bill passed the Senate as well on March 1, and was signed into law by President Biden later the same day.

== Full-year appropriations legislation ==
=== First minibus ===
Consolidated Appropriations Act, 2024
- Long title: An Act making consolidated appropriations for the fiscal year ending September 30, 2024, and for other purposes.

Citations
- Public law: Pub. L. 118–42 (text) (PDF)

Legislative history
- Introduced in the House as the Military Construction, Veterans Affairs, and Related Agencies Appropriations Act, 2024 (H.R. 4366) by John Carter (R–TX) on June 27, 2023; Committee consideration by United States House Committee on Appropriations; Passed the House on July 27, 2023 (219–211); Passed the Senate as the Consolidated Appropriations Act, 2024 on November 1, 2023 (82–15) with amendment; House agreed to Senate amendment on March 6, 2024 (339–85) with further amendment; Senate agreed to House amendment on March 8, 2024 (75–22); Signed into law by President Joe Biden on March 9, 2024

On March 3, 2024, House and Senate appropriators released a $459 billion "minibus" spending package containing six of the twelve appropriations bills. The bill provided funding for the Departments of Agriculture, Commerce, Justice, Energy, Interior, Veterans Affairs, Transportation, and Housing and Urban Development, as well as the EPA, the Army Corps of Engineers, and other military construction. Democrats cheered full funding for WIC programs, which provide food assistance for women, infants and children; provisions for rental assistance, a pay raise for firefighters, and investments in new air traffic controllers; and the lack of "poison pill" riders promoted by Republicans. Republicans cheered cuts to the FBI, ATF, and EPA, although Democrats contested the extent of the cuts. The rightmost faction of the Republican conference harshly opposed the deal, arguing it did not contain any substantial conservative policy; the proposal also drew criticism from some Democrats, who expressed concern over a provision allowing mentally incompetent veterans to buy guns in certain circumstances.

The minibus deal passed the House on Wednesday, March 6, and the Senate on March 8; it was signed into law by President Biden on Saturday, March 9. The passage of the bill on coincided with two other major political events that week: Super Tuesday (on Tuesday, March 5) and 2024 State of the Union Address (on Thursday, March 7).

=== Second minibus ===
Further Consolidated Appropriations Act, 2024
- Long title: An Act making further consolidated appropriations for the fiscal year ending September 30, 2024, and for other purposes.

Citations
- Public law: Pub. L. 118–47 (text) (PDF)

Legislative history
- Introduced in the House as the Udall Foundation Reauthorization Act of 2023 (H.R. 2882) by Juan Ciscomani (R–AZ) on April 26, 2023; Committee consideration by United States House Committee on Appropriations; Passed the House on February 5, 2024 (350–58); Passed the Senate on March 12, 2024 (unanimous consent) with amendment; House agreed to Senate amendment on March 22, 2024 (286–134) with further amendment; Senate agreed to House amendment on March 23, 2024 (74–24); Signed into law by President Joe Biden on March 23, 2024

Following the passage of the first minibus, negotiators shifted to work on a second minibus bill to fund the remaining federal departments. Funding for the Department of Homeland Security emerged as a sticking point, with both parties seeking various riders related to border policy, with negotiators pivoting to a full-year CR for that department, which would keep funding flat. That plan ran into a last-minute pushback from the Biden administration, which wanted more funding and flexibility on the border.

On March 18, negotiators reached an agreement, with text to come. Jeffries touted the work of a bipartisan coalition, saying: "[W]e've said from the very beginning of this Congress, as Democrats, that we will find bipartisan common ground with our Republican colleagues on any issue, whenever and wherever possible, as long as it will make life better for the American people. That's exactly what House Democrats continue to do". As part of negotiations to avert a government shutdown, Jeffries and Democrats helped secure at least one project as an earmark for every Democratic member. According to CNN, most members saw their share of earmarks go up $616,279 over what had passed in committee. Rep. Rosa DeLauro, Ranking Member of the House Appropriations Committee, said, "He negotiated. He got what we needed to have".

The second "minibus" spending package passed the House on March 22 by a vote of 286 to 134 (101 Republicans and 184 Democrats voted in favor; 112 Republicans and 22 Democrats voted against). The Senate voted 74-24 early Saturday morning on March 23 to pass the $1.2 trillion government funding bill after heated last-minute negotiations caused senators to breach the midnight deadline to avert a funding gap. While the final passage came after the midnight deadline, the Senate's actions prevented any lapse in government function. President Biden signed the bill on March 23, completing the regular appropriations process for the fiscal year.

== Supplemental appropriations ==
On April 20, over two months after the Senate had passed a previous funding bill for Israel, Taiwan, and Ukraine, Jeffries negotiated the legislative path for the bill and delivered a majority of Democratic votes to pass a new legislative package providing aid to the three countries in separate bills, each of which passed Congress with bipartisan support and large majorities and was signed into law by President Biden. The bill was voted against in committee by three Freedom Caucus members - enough to prevent it progressing under normal circumstances - but all Democrats voted for it. The legislative package also included a House-passed bill to force the app TikTok to divest from its Chinese Communist Party-owned parent company, ByteDance, as well as the REPO for Ukrainians Act, a measure that allows the U.S. government to fund the Ukrainian war effort with assets seized from Russian oligarchs.

Pursuant to a resolution agreed to by the House, the bills were merged into a single Act before being sent to the Senate: the latter therefore held one vote on the whole package, which passed on April 23. President Biden signed it into law the following day.

During debate on the bill, Jeffries emphasized the role of the bipartisan legislative coalition by stating, "We have a responsibility, not as Democrats or Republicans, but as Americans to defend democracy wherever it is at risk". In an interview with CBS's 60 Minutes following the major vote, Jeffries added "effectively have been governing as if we were in the majority." Following the votes to stave off a federal government shutdown and send foreign assistance abroad, the Associated Press said that Jeffries, as the minority leader, "might very well be the most powerful person in Congress right now."

=== House votes ===
21st Century Peace Through Strength Act
Party	Yes	No	Voted "Present"	Not voting
Republican	186	25	—N/a	7
Democratic	174	33	—N/a	6
Total votes	360	58	—N/a	13

Indo-Pacific Security Supplemental Appropriations Act, 2024
Party	Yes	No	Voted "Present"	Not voting
Republican	178	34	—N/a	6
Democratic	207	—N/a	1	5
Total votes	385	34	1	11

Ukraine Security Supplemental Appropriations Act, 2024
Party	Yes	No	Voted "Present"	Not voting
Republican	101	112	1	4
Democratic	210	—N/a	—N/a	3
Total votes	311	112	1	7

Israel Security Supplemental Appropriations Act, 2024
Party	Yes	No	Voted "Present"	Not voting
Republican	193	21	—N/a	4
Democratic	173	37	—N/a	3
Total votes	366	58	—N/a	7

=== Senate vote ===
An Act making emergency supplemental appropriations for the fiscal year ending September 30, 2024, and for other purposes
Party	Yes	No	Voted "Present"	Not voting
Democratic	46	2	—N/a	—N/a
Republican	31	15	—N/a	3
Independent (Note: All three independent senators caucus with the Democrats.)	2	1	—N/a	—N/a
Total votes	79	18	3	3
