= Continuing resolution =

Funding measure in the United States

In the United States, a continuing resolution (often abbreviated to CR) is a type of appropriations legislation, which allocates money to specific federal government departments, agencies, and programs. The money provides funding for operations, personnel, equipment, and activities.

Regular appropriations bills are passed annually, with the funding they provide covering one fiscal year, which, for the federal government, runs from October 1 to September 30. When Congress and the president fail to agree on and pass one or more of the regular appropriations bills, a continuing resolution can be passed instead. A continuing resolution continues the pre-existing appropriations at the same levels as the previous fiscal year (or with minor modifications) for a set amount of time. Continuing resolutions typically provide funding at a rate or formula based on the previous year's funding.

The funding extends until a specific date or regular appropriations bills are passed, whichever comes first. There can be some changes to some of the accounts in a continuing resolution. The continuing resolution takes the form of a joint resolution, and may provide bridging funding for existing federal programs at current, reduced, or expanded levels.

== Appropriations bills ==
An appropriations bill allocates money to specific federal government departments, agencies, and programs, to fund operations, personnel, equipment, and activities. Traditionally, regular appropriations bills are passed annually, with the funding they provide covering one fiscal year.

There are three types of appropriations bills: regular appropriations bills, continuing resolutions, and supplemental appropriations bills. Regular appropriations bills are the twelve standard bills that cover the funding for the federal government for one fiscal year and that are supposed to be enacted into law by October 1.

If Congress has not enacted the regular appropriations bills by the time, it can pass a continuing resolution, which continues the pre-existing appropriations at the same levels as the previous fiscal year (or with minor modifications) for a set amount of time. The third type of appropriations bills are supplemental appropriations bills, which add additional funding above and beyond what was originally appropriated at the beginning of the fiscal year. Supplemental appropriations bills can be used for things like disaster relief.

== United States budget and spending process ==
The United States government operates on a budget calendar that runs from October 1 to September 30. Each year, Congress must appropriate a specific amount of money to each department, agency, and program to provide funding for operations, personnel, equipment, and activities. Traditionally, the United States House of Representatives and the United States Senate agree together on a budget resolution in the spring, that is then used to determine spending limits for twelve regular appropriations bills. The twelve appropriations bills then appropriate the funding for the federal government to use for the next budgetary year. The appropriations bills must be signed into the law by the President, although the budget resolution itself is not subject to his or her approval.

If Congress fails to appropriate the necessary funds for the federal government, the government shuts down as a result of the Antideficiency Act. The law "forbids federal officials from entering into financial obligations for which they do not have funding," such as buying ink, paying for electricity, or paying employees.

Congress can avoid a government shutdown by passing a continuing resolution instead.

== Advantages and disadvantages ==
Standoffs between the President and Congress or between political parties, elections, and more urgent legislative matters complicate the budget process, frequently making the continuing resolution a common occurrence in American government. They allow the government to take its time making difficult fiscal decisions.

Federal agencies are disrupted during periods of reduced funding. With non-essential operations suspended, many agencies are forced to interrupt research projects, training programs, or other important functions. Its impact on day-to-day management can be severe, costing some employees the equivalent of several months' time.

== History ==
Between fiscal year 1977 and fiscal year 2015, Congress only passed all twelve regular appropriations bills on time in four years - fiscal years 1977, 1989, 1995, and 1997.

Between 1980 and 2013, there were eight government shutdowns in the United States. Most of these shutdowns revolved around budget issues including fights over the debt ceiling and led to the furlough of certain 'non-essential' personnel. The majority of these fights lasted 1–2 days with a few exceptions lasting more than a week.

There was a government shutdown that occurred in 1995. This incident involved a standoff between Democratic President, Bill Clinton, and Congressional Republicans that led to the shutdown of the federal government. Without enough votes to override President Clinton's veto, Newt Gingrich led the Republicans not to submit a revised budget, allowing the previously approved appropriations to expire on schedule. The resulting lack of appropriations led to the shutdown of non-essential functions of the federal government for 28 days due to lack of funds.

In 2013, Congress failed to agree on any regular appropriations bills prior to the start of fiscal year 2014. An attempt was made to pass the Continuing Appropriations Resolution, 2014 (H.J.Res 59) prior to October 1, but the House and Senate could not agree on its provisions, leading to the United States federal government shutdown of 2013. The shutdown of October 2013 involved a dispute over the continuing resolution in a standoff between Democratic President Barack Obama and Congressional Republicans led by House Speaker John Boehner. The forefront issue was House Republicans' attempt to tie a continuing resolution to a defunding or delay of the Patient Protection and Affordable Care Act while Senate Democrats insisted on a "clean" spending bill not tied to any other changes.

The lack of agreement led to a prolonged shutdown and furlough of more than 800,000 federal workers. The federal government resumed operations on October 17, 2013 after the passage of a continuing resolution, the Continuing Appropriations Act, 2014, that provided funding until January 15, 2014. On January 15, 2014, Congress passed another continuing resolution, H.J.Res. 106 Making further continuing appropriations for fiscal year 2014, to provide funding until January 18, 2014. Congress finally passed the Consolidated Appropriations Act, 2014, an omnibus appropriations bill, on January 17, 2014 to provide funding for the remaining fiscal year 2014.

== List of continuing resolutions for the U.S. federal budget ==
=== 2001 U.S. federal budget ===
- Continuing Appropriations Resolution, 2001 (1st): Pub. L. 106–275 (text) (PDF)
- Continuing Appropriations Resolution, 2001 (2nd): Pub. L. 106–282 (text) (PDF)
- Continuing Appropriations Resolution, 2001 (3rd): Pub. L. 106–306 (text) (PDF)
- Continuing Appropriations Resolution, 2001 (4th): Pub. L. 106–344 (text) (PDF)
- Continuing Appropriations Resolution, 2001 (5th): Pub. L. 106–358 (text) (PDF)
- Continuing Appropriations Resolution, 2001 (6th): Pub. L. 106–359 (text) (PDF)
- Continuing Appropriations Resolution, 2001 (7th): Pub. L. 106–381 (text) (PDF)
- Continuing Appropriations Resolution, 2001 (8th): Pub. L. 106–388 (text) (PDF)
- Continuing Appropriations Resolution, 2001 (9th): Pub. L. 106–389 (text) (PDF)
- Continuing Appropriations Resolution, 2001 (10th): Pub. L. 106–401 (text) (PDF)
- Continuing Appropriations Resolution, 2001 (11th): Pub. L. 106–403 (text) (PDF)
- Continuing Appropriations Resolution, 2001 (12th): Pub. L. 106–416 (text) (PDF)
- Continuing Appropriations Resolution, 2001 (13th): Pub. L. 106–426 (text) (PDF)
- Continuing Appropriations Resolution, 2001 (14th): Pub. L. 106–427 (text) (PDF)
- Continuing Appropriations Resolution, 2001 (15th): Pub. L. 106–428 (text) (PDF)
- Continuing Appropriations Resolution, 2001 (16th): Pub. L. 106–520 (text) (PDF)
- Continuing Appropriations Resolution, 2001 (17th): Pub. L. 106–537 (text) (PDF)
- Continuing Appropriations Resolution, 2001 (18th): Pub. L. 106–539 (text) (PDF)
- Continuing Appropriations Resolution, 2001 (19th): Pub. L. 106–540 (text) (PDF)
- Continuing Appropriations Resolution, 2001 (20th): Pub. L. 106–542 (text) (PDF)
- Continuing Appropriations Resolution, 2001 (21st): Pub. L. 106–543 (text) (PDF)

=== 2002 U.S. federal budget ===
- Continuing Appropriations Resolution, 2002 (8th): Pub. L. 107–97 (text) (PDF)

=== 2003 U.S. federal budget ===
- Continuing Appropriations Resolution, 2003 (1st): Pub. L. 107–229 (text) (PDF)
- Continuing Appropriations Resolution, 2003 (2nd): Pub. L. 107–235 (text) (PDF)
- Continuing Appropriations Resolution, 2003 (3rd): Pub. L. 107–240 (text) (PDF)
- Continuing Appropriations Resolution, 2003 (4th): Pub. L. 107–244 (text) (PDF)
- Continuing Appropriations Resolution, 2003 (5th): Pub. L. 107–294 (text) (PDF)
- Continuing Appropriations Resolution, 2003 (6th): Pub. L. 108–2 (text) (PDF)
- Continuing Appropriations Resolution, 2003 (7th): Pub. L. 108–4 (text) (PDF)
- Continuing Appropriations Resolution, 2003 (8th): Pub. L. 108–5 (text) (PDF)

=== 2007 U.S. federal budget ===
- Continuing Appropriations Resolution, 2007 (1st): Division B of Pub. L. 109–289 (text) (PDF)
- Continuing Appropriations Resolution, 2007 (2nd): Pub. L. 109–369 (text) (PDF)
- Continuing Appropriations Resolution, 2007 (3rd): Pub. L. 109–383 (text) (PDF)
- Revised Continuing Appropriations Resolution, 2007: Pub. L. 110–5 (text) (PDF)

=== 2008 U.S. federal budget ===
- Continuing Appropriations Resolution, 2008 (1st): Pub. L. 110–92 (text) (PDF)
- Continuing Appropriations Resolution, 2008 (2nd): Division B of Pub. L. 110–116 (text) (PDF)
- Continuing Appropriations Resolution, 2008 (3rd): Pub. L. 110–137 (text) (PDF)
- Continuing Appropriations Resolution, 2008 (4th): Pub. L. 110–149 (text) (PDF)

=== 2009 U.S. federal budget ===
- Continuing Appropriations Resolution, 2009 (1st): Division A of Pub. L. 110–329 (text) (PDF)
- Continuing Appropriations Resolution, 2009 (2nd): Pub. L. 111–6 (text) (PDF)

=== 2010 U.S. federal budget ===
- Continuing Appropriations Resolution, 2010 (1st): Division B of Pub. L. 111–68 (text) (PDF)
- Continuing Appropriations Resolution, 2010 (2nd): Division B of Pub. L. 111–88 (text) (PDF)

=== 2011 U.S. federal budget ===
Beginning in September 2010, Congress passed a series of continuing resolutions to fund the government.

- 1st Continuing Resolution, funding from October 1, 2010 through December 3, 2010, passed on September 29, 2010. (Pub.L. 111-242)
- 2nd Continuing Resolution, funding through December 18, 2010, passed on December 2, 2010. (Pub. L. 111–290 (text) (PDF))
- 3rd Continuing Resolution, funding through December 21, 2010, passed on December 17, 2010. (Pub. L. 111–317 (text) (PDF))
- 4th Continuing Resolution, funding through March 4, 2011, passed on December 21, 2010. (Pub. L. 111–322 (text) (PDF))
- 5th Continuing Resolution ("Further Continuing Appropriations Amendments, 2011"), funding through March 18, 2011, passed on March 2, 2011. (Pub.L. 112-4) This resolution cut $4 billion from 2010 spending levels.
- 6th Continuing Resolution ("Additional Continuing Appropriations Amendments, 2011"), funding through April 8, 2011, passed on March 16, 2011. (Pub.L. 112-6) This resolution cut an additional $6 billion from 2010 spending levels.
- 7th Continuing Resolution ("Further Additional Continuing Appropriations Amendments, 2011"), funding through April 15, 2011, passed on April 9, 2011. (Pub.L. 112-8) This continuing resolution followed a deal on the full annual budget which was made with just hours remaining before a government shutdown. It itself contains an additional $2 billion in cuts. Democrats had previously rejected a Republican-backed resolution passed by the House before the deal, which would have funded the government for another week and cut an additional $12 billion from 2010 levels.

=== 2013 U.S. federal budget ===
The government began fiscal year 2013 operating under the Continuing Appropriations Resolution, 2013 (Pub. L. 112–175 (text) (PDF)), which provided funding through March 27, 2013. It was signed by President Obama on September 28, 2012. Spending through the end of fiscal year 2013 was authorized by the Consolidated and Further Continuing Appropriations Act, 2013, signed into law by President Obama on March 26, 2013.

=== 2014 U.S. federal budget ===
- Continuing Appropriations Resolution, 2014 (H.J.Res 59) (H.J.Res. 59) - a proposed continuing resolution that failed final passage, leading to the United States federal government shutdown of 2013
- October 2013 mini-continuing resolutions - continuing resolutions proposed during the 2013 federal government shutdown that would have funded small portions of the government
- Continuing Appropriations Act, 2014 (Pub. L. 113–46 (text) (PDF);H.R. 2775) - continuing resolution that ended the federal government shutdown and appropriated funds through January 15, 2014
- Making further continuing appropriations for fiscal year 2014 - appropriated funds through January 18, 2014.
- Consolidated Appropriations Act, 2014 (H.R. 3547; 113th Congress) - proposed, as of January 16, 2014

=== 2015 U.S. federal budget ===
- Continuing Appropriations Resolution, 2015 - a continuing resolution that would fund the federal government of the United States through December 11, 2014 at an annualized rate of $1 trillion. On September 17, 2014, the House voted in Roll Call Vote 509 to pass the bill 319-108. On September 18, 2014, the United States Senate voted in Roll Call Vote 270 to pass the bill 78-22.

=== 2016 U.S. federal budget ===
- Continuing Appropriations Resolution, 2016 - a continuing resolution that would fund the federal government of the United States through December 11, 2015 at an annualized rate of $1.02 trillion.

=== 2017 U.S. federal budget ===
- Continuing Appropriations Resolution, 2017 (Pub. L. 114–223 (text) (PDF)) - a continuing resolution that would fund the federal government of the United States through December 9, 2016 at 0.496% below the operating rate of the FY 2016 enacted appropriation. On September 28, 2016, the Senate voted 72-26 to pass the bill and later that day, the House voted 342-85 to pass the bill. The President signed the bill on September 29, 2016. The bill also included full-year funding for Military Construction and Veterans Affairs and emergency funding for Zika virus response and preparedness.

=== 2018 U.S. federal budget ===
- Division D of Continuing Appropriations Act, 2018 and Supplemental Appropriations for Disaster Relief Requirements Act, 2017 (Pub. L. 115–56 (text) (PDF)), extending temporary funding until December 8, 2017.
- Further Continuing Appropriations Act, 2018 (Pub. L. 115–90 (text) (PDF)), extending temporary funding through December 22, 2017
- Further Additional Continuing Appropriations Act, 2018 (Pub. L. 115–96 (text) (PDF)), extending temporary funding through January 19, 2018.
- Further Extension of Continuing Appropriations Act, 2018 (enacted as Subdivision 3 of Division B of Honoring Hometown Heroes Act, H.R. 1892), extending temporary funding through March 23, 2018.

=== 2024 U.S. federal budget ===
- Making continuing appropriations for fiscal year 2024, and for other purposes H.R. 5860, extending temporary funding through November 17, 2023.
- Further Continuing Appropriations and Other Extensions Act, 2024 H.R. 6363, extending temporary funding of certain government programs until January 19, 2024, and most of the rest until February 2, 2024.
- Making further continuing appropriations for the fiscal year ending September 30, 2024, and for other purposes H.R. 2872, extending temporary funding through March 8, 2024.
- Extension of Continuing Appropriations and Other Matters Act, 2024 H.R. 7463, extending temporary funding through March 22, 2024.

=== 2025 U.S. federal budget ===
- Continuing Appropriations and Extensions Act, 2025 H.R. 9747, extending temporary funding through December 20, 2024.
- American Relief Act, 2025 H.R. 10545, extending temporary funding through March 14, 2025.
- Full-Year Continuing Appropriations and Extensions Act, 2025 H.R. 1968, extending funding through the rest of the 2025 fiscal year.

=== 2026 U.S. federal budget ===
- Continuing Appropriations, Agriculture, Legislative Branch, Military Construction and Veterans Affairs, and Extensions Act, 2026 H.R. 5371, extending temporary funding through January 30, 2026.

=== 2027 U.S. federal budget ===
- Continuing Appropriations Act, 2027 H.R.9770, for extending temporary funding until December 4, 2026 was passed by the House on July 21, 2026 with a vote of 220-205. The Senate passed its own version of Continuing Appropriations and Extensions Act, 2027 H.R.6500 on August 8, 2026 by a vote of 90-6 for extending government funding at current levels for Fiscal Year (FY) 2027 until December 11, 2026. On September 1, the U.S. House of Representatives finally passed the Senate’s Continuing Resolution (CR/H.R. 6500) by a vote of 370-48 - and on September 2, 2026, the President signed it into law that provides fiscal year 2027 appropriations to Federal agencies through December 11, 2026.

== See also ==
- Government shutdowns in the United States
