= Motion to vacate the chair =

Legal or parliamentary process

A motion to vacate the chair or motion to declare the chair vacant, commonly shortened to motion to vacate, is a procedure in which a member of a legislative body proposes that the presiding officer vacates their office.

== Manuals of parliamentary procedure ==
Robert's Rules of Order Newly Revised allows this motion to be used if the occupant of the chair is not the regular presiding officer of a society, in which case it is a question of privilege affecting the assembly. If the chair is the regular presiding officer, the motion to declare the chair vacant cannot be used. However, the assembly could temporarily remove the chair for the meeting using a suspension of the rules. The bylaws of the organization would determine how to permanently remove the officer.

Demeter's Manual states that the procedure is to either bring charges against the presiding officer for neglect of duty or abolish their term of office by amending the bylaws with due notice to all members; either of these methods requires a two-thirds vote.

Mason's Manual provides, "A presiding officer who has been elected by the house may be removed by the house upon a majority vote of all the members elected, and a new presiding officer pro tempore elected and qualified. When there is no fixed term of office, an officer holds office at the pleasure of the body, or until a successor is elected and qualified."

== In the U.S. House of Representatives ==
Resolved, That the office of Speaker of the House of Representatives is hereby declared to be vacant.

— The effective words of a resolution declaring the office of Speaker of the House of Representatives to be vacant.

A resolution declaring the office of Speaker of the United States House of Representatives vacant (informally referred to as a "motion to vacate") is considered privileged under certain circumstances. Under Rule IX, a privileged resolution, once raised on the floor by a member, must be put to a floor vote within two legislative days. From the 1st Congress through the 115th Congress, as well as in the 118th Congress, a motion to vacate raised on the floor was always considered privileged. In the 116th Congress and 117th United States Congress, it was privileged only if "offered on behalf of a party conference or caucus", and in the 119th Congress, only if submitted by a member of the majority party and co-sponsored by eight other members of the majority party.

The motion to vacate can be introduced on the floor or through the regular channels: the motion is not privileged until or unless it is introduced on the floor.

In the history of the House of Representatives, there have been only four instances of a motion to vacate the chair being filed: one in March 1910 against Joe Cannon, which failed; one in July 2015 against John Boehner, which was never put up to a vote; one in October 2023 against Kevin McCarthy, which, unlike its predecessors, was successful; and one against Mike Johnson, which failed.

=== Motions filed ===
==== Attempt to remove Joe Cannon (1910) ====
On March 19, 1910, Republican Speaker Joe Cannon, who had just faced a revolt by his caucus on a resolution weakening the Speaker's power over the Rules Committee, dared his opponents to try to vacate his Speakership; Democratic representative Albert Burleson immediately proceeded to introduce a privileged resolution to that effect, which the House ended up rejecting by a majority of 37 (155 Ayes to 192 Noes). Some of the Republicans who opposed Cannon nonetheless voted against, fearing the risk of him being replaced by a Democratic Speaker.

==== Filing against John Boehner (2015) ====
In July 2015, Republican representative Mark Meadows filed a resolution to vacate the Speakership of Republican John Boehner. Since the resolution was introduced through regular channels rather than on the floor, it was non-privileged and was referred to the Rules Committee instead of being subject to an immediate vote by the full House. While the resolution was never debated nor voted upon, and only gained four co-sponsors (Louie Gohmert, Walter Jones Jr., Thomas Massie and Ted Yoho), it nonetheless contributed to Boehner's decision to resign in September 2015.

==== Removal of Kevin McCarthy (2023) ====
On October 2, 2023, Republican representative Matt Gaetz filed a privileged resolution to vacate the office of Speaker, then held by Republican Kevin McCarthy, after McCarthy negotiated with Democrats to pass a spending bill that averted a government shutdown; the bill was opposed by several Republican representatives because it did not include fiscally conservative reforms. The resolution to vacate was considered by the House on October 3. Tom Cole, chairman of the Republican-led House Rules Committee, moved to table (kill) the resolution, but his motion was rejected by a vote of 208–218. The House thus proceeded to consider the resolution, and, following one hour of debate (evenly divided between Gaetz and Cole), passed it by a vote of 216–210 (with Republicans Andy Biggs, Tim Burchett, Ken Buck, Eli Crane, Gaetz, Bob Good, Nancy Mace and Matt Rosendale voting in favor alongside all Democrats who were present); this was the first time in congressional history the House voted to remove its incumbent Speaker.

==== Attempt to remove Mike Johnson (2024) ====
On March 22, 2024, Republican representative Marjorie Taylor Greene filed a resolution to remove Mike Johnson as Speaker of the House, after the latter put up for a vote a minibus spending bill opposed by a majority of the Republican Conference (thereby violating the Hastert convention). As of April 19, the resolution had gained two co-sponsors (Thomas Massie and Paul Gosar).

On May 8, 2024, Greene introduced a resolution to vacate the office of Speaker on the floor, forcing a vote on it within two legislative days. Majority leader Steve Scalise immediately moved to table (kill) the resolution; the House passed Scalise's motion by a vote of 359 to 43, effectively allowing Johnson to remain as Speaker. Most Democrats voted with Republicans against removing Johnson because of the role he had played in providing funding for the federal government and for Ukraine. The members who voted against tabling the motion included some of the more progressive Democrats and several Republicans associated with the populist right. Speakership procedural votes typically track more closely along strict party lines.

Motion to Table Greene's resolution
Party	Yes (voted to prevent a vote on removing Johnson)	No (voted to allow a vote on removing Johnson)	Voted "Present"	Not voting
Republican	196	11: Andy Biggs; Eric Burlison; Eli Crane; Warren Davidson; Paul Gosar; Marjorie Taylor Greene; Thomas Massie; Alex Mooney; Barry Moore; Chip Roy; Victoria Spartz	—N/a	10
Democratic	163	32: Nanette Barragán; Jamaal Bowman; Cori Bush; Greg Casar; Joaquin Castro; Yvette D. Clarke; Gerald E. Connolly; Diana DeGette; Lloyd Doggett; Veronica Escobar; John Garamendi; Sylvia Garcia; Robert Garcia; Jimmy Gomez; Josh Harder; Jonathan Jackson; Pramila Jayapal; Sydney Kamlager; Barbara Lee; Summer Lee; Rob Menendez; Alexandria Ocasio-Cortez; Ayanna Pressley; Delia Ramirez; Pat Ryan; Mary Gay Scanlon; Rashida Tlaib; Nydia M. Velázquez; Maxine Waters; Bonnie Watson Coleman; Nikema Williams; Maxwell Frost	7: Judy Chu; Chuy García; Ilhan Omar; Mark Pocan; Jan Schakowsky; Mark Takano; Norma J. Torres	11
Total votes	359	43	7	21

=== Considered invocations ===
==== Consideration against Newt Gingrich (1997) ====
In July 1997, four Republican Representatives considered using the motion to vacate against Speaker Newt Gingrich after he engaged in an ethics violation in January 1997. Ultimately, the Representatives did not invoke a motion.

== In the Congress of the Philippines ==
Deriving its rules from the United States Congress, the Congress of the Philippines also has a motion to vacate the chair within its rulebooks, to remove the sitting House Speaker or Senate President midway a congressional session. Another similar motion is to vacate all leadership positions (not just the presiding officer). The instances of this happening are:

- November 14, 2000: These votes were held on the heels of the impeachment of Joseph Estrada.
  - Senate President Franklin Drilon lost the motion by a vote of 12–7.
  - House Speaker Manny Villar lost the motion by a vote of 115–93, with one abstention. Villar was nominated for speaker in the ensuing election, and lost 93–114, with two abstentions, to Arnulfo Fuentebella.
- January 24, 2001: House Speaker Arnulfo Fuentebella personally approved the motion to vacate the chair, removing him from office.
- February 3, 2008: House Speaker Jose de Venecia Jr. lost the motion by a vote of 174–35, with 16 abstentions.
- October 13, 2020: House Speaker Alan Peter Cayetano lost the motion by 186 affirmative votes.
- September 8, 2025: Senate President Francis Escudero personally approved the motion to vacate the chair, removing him from office.
- May 11, 2026: Senate President Tito Sotto lost the motion by a vote of 13–10, with 1 abstention. Sotto was nominated for Senate president in the ensuing election, and lost 9–13 to Alan Peter Cayetano, with 2 abstentions.
- June 2, 2026: Senate President Alan Peter Cayetano (who was absent) lost the motion by a vote of 12–0. Sherwin Gatchalian was later unanimously as Senate president pro tempore, and was then named acting Senate president. Cayetano decried the session as void, pointing out the session supposedly did not have a quorum.

== See also ==
- Vacated judgment
