= 2015 United States federal appropriations =

Every year, the United States Congress is responsible for writing, passing, reconciling, and submitting to the president of the United States a series of appropriations bills that appropriate money to specific federal government departments, agencies, and programs for their use to operate in the subsequent fiscal year. The money provides funding for operations, personnel, equipment, and activities. In 2014, Congress was responsible for passing the appropriations bills that would fund the federal government in fiscal year 2015, which runs from October 1, 2014, to September 30, 2015.

There are twelve regular appropriations bills that are supposed to be passed by October 1 each year. As of June 18, 2014, the United States House of Representatives had passed five regular appropriations bills and was debating another. The United States Senate had not passed any appropriations bills by June 18, 2014, but was working on a "minibus" appropriations bill that would take the place of three of the regular appropriations bills.

== Appropriations bills ==
An appropriations bill is a bill that appropriates (gives to, sets aside for) money to specific federal government departments, agencies, and programs. The money provides funding for operations, personnel, equipment, and activities. Regular appropriations bills are passed annually, with the funding they provide covering one fiscal year. The fiscal year is the accounting period of the federal government, which runs from October 1 to September 30 of the following year. Appropriations bills are under the jurisdiction of the United States House Committee on Appropriations and the United States Senate Committee on Appropriations. Both Committees have twelve matching subcommittees, each tasked with working on one of the twelve annual regular appropriations bills.

There are three types of appropriations bills: regular appropriations bills, continuing resolutions, and supplemental appropriations bills. Regular appropriations bills are the twelve standard bills that cover the funding for the federal government for one fiscal year and that are supposed to be enacted into law by October 1. If Congress has not enacted the regular appropriations bills by the time, it may pass a continuing resolution, which generally continues the pre-existing appropriations at the same levels as the previous fiscal year (or with minor modifications) for a set amount of time. The third type of appropriations bills are supplemental appropriations bills, which add additional funding above and beyond what was originally appropriated at the beginning of the fiscal year. Supplemental appropriations bills can be used for things like disaster relief.

== Appropriations process ==
Traditionally, after a federal budget for the upcoming fiscal year has been passed, the appropriations subcommittees receive information about what the budget sets as their spending ceilings. This is called 302(b) allocations after section 302(b) of the Congressional Budget Act of 1974. That amount is separated into smaller amounts for each of the twelve Subcommittees. The federal budget does not become law and is not signed by the President. Instead, it is a guide for the House and the Senate in making appropriations and tax decisions. However, no budget is required and each chamber has procedures in place for what to do without one. The House and Senate now consider appropriations bills simultaneously, although originally the House went first. The House Committee on Appropriations usually reports the appropriations bills in May and June and the Senate in June. Any differences between appropriations bills passed by the House and the Senate are resolved in the fall.

=== Fiscal year 2015 appropriations timeline ===
- April 17, 2014 - The Legislative Branch Appropriations Act, 2015 (H.R. 4487) was introduced in the House by Rep. Tom Cole (R-OK).
- April 17, 2014 - The Military Construction and Veterans Affairs and Related Agencies Appropriations Act, 2015 (H.R. 4486) was introduced in the House by Rep. John Culberson (R-TX).
- April 30, 2014 - The House voted in Roll Call Vote 187 to pass H.R. 4486 by a vote of 416–1.
- May 1, 2014 - The House voted in Roll Call Vote 193 to pass H.R. 4487 by a vote of 402–14.
- May 15, 2014 - The Commerce, Justice, Science, and Related Agencies Appropriations Act, 2015 (H.R. 4660) was introduced in the House by Rep. Frank Wolf (R-VA).
- May 27, 2014 - The Transportation, Housing and Urban Development, and Related Agencies Appropriations Act, 2015 (H.R. 4745) was introduced into the House by Rep. Tom Latham (R-IA).
- May 30, 2014 - The House voted to pass H.R. 4660 in Roll Call Vote 269 by a vote of 321–87.
- June 4, 2014 - The Agriculture, Rural Development, Food and Drug Administration, and Related Agencies Appropriations Act, 2015 (H.R. 4800) was introduced in the House by Rep. Robert Aderholt (R-AL).
- June 10, 2014 - The House voted in Roll Call Vote 297 to pass H.R. 4745 by a vote of 229–192.
- June 13, 2014 - The Department of Defense Appropriations Act, 2015 (H.R. 4870) was introduced in the House by Rep. Rodney Frelinghuysen (R-NJ).
- June 17, 2014 - H.R. 4660 used by the Senate as a "minibus" legislative vehicle for multiple appropriations bills.
- June 18, 2014 - H.R. 4870 considered and amended on the House floor.
- July 2, 2014 - The Financial Services and General Government Appropriations Act, 2015 (H.R. 5016; 113th Congress) is introduced into the House by Rep. Ander Crenshaw (R-FL).
- July 7, 2014 (week of) - H.R. 4923 considered and amended on the House floor.
- July 14, 2014 - House begins consideration and amendments process for H.R. 5016.

== Appropriations bills for fiscal year 2015 ==
=== Summary ===
House bill	$	Senate bill	$	Departments and agencies covered
Agriculture, Rural Development, Food and Drug Administration, and Related Agencies Appropriations Act, 2015 (H.R. 4800; 113th Congress)	$20.9 billion	"Minibus" amendment to H.R. 4660	$120 billion	Department of Agriculture, Rural Development, and Food and Drug Administration
Commerce, Justice, Science, and Related Agencies Appropriations Act, 2015 (H.R. 4660; 113th Congress)	$51.2 billion	"Minibus" amendment to H.R. 4660	$120 billion	Department of Commerce, Department of Justice, NASA, and National Science Foundation
Department of Defense Appropriations Act, 2015 (H.R. 4870; 113th Congress)	$491 billion			Department of Defense
Energy and Water Development and Related Agencies Appropriations Act, 2015 (H.R. 4923; 113th Congress)	$34 billion			Department of Energy and Water Development
Financial Services and General Government Appropriations Act, 2015 (H.R. 5016; 113th Congress)	$21.285 billion			Department of the Treasury, United States federal courts, the Executive Office of the President, and Washington, D.C. appropriations
Department of Homeland Security Appropriations Act, 2015 (H.R. 240; 114 Congress)	$60.9 billion			Department of Homeland Security
				Department of the Interior and Environmental Protection Agency
				Department of Labor, Department of Health and Human Services, and Department of Education
Legislative Branch Appropriations Act, 2015 (H.R. 4487; 113th Congress)	$3.3 billion			United States Congress
Military Construction and Veterans Affairs and Related Agencies Appropriations Act, 2015 (H.R. 4486; 113th Congress)	$71.5 billion.			Military Construction and Department of Veterans Affairs
				Department of State and Foreign Operations
Transportation, Housing and Urban Development, and Related Agencies Appropriations Act, 2015 (H.R. 4745; 113th Congress)	$52 billion	"Minibus" amendment to H.R. 4660	$120 billion	Department of Transportation and Department of Housing and Urban Development

=== Agriculture, Rural Development, Food and Drug Administration, and Related Agencies ===
The Agriculture, Rural Development, Food and Drug Administration, and Related Agencies Appropriations Act, 2015 (H.R. 4800; 113th Congress) would appropriate $20.9 billion. The funding would go to the United States Department of Agriculture (USDA) and its programs and services, such as the United States Secretary of Agriculture, the National Appeals Division, the Under Secretary of Agriculture for Research, Education, and Economics, the Economic Research Service, the National Agricultural Statistics Service, the Agricultural Research Service, the National Institute of Food and Agriculture, the Office of the Under Secretary for Marketing and Regulatory Programs, the Animal and Plant Health Inspection Service, the Agricultural Marketing Service, the Grain Inspection, Packers and Stockyards Administration, the Under Secretary of Agriculture for Food Safety, the Food Safety and Inspection Service, the Under Secretary of Agriculture for Farm and Foreign Agricultural Services, the Farm Service Agency, the Risk Management Agency, and other related agencies. One controversial provision of the bill was the provision that would waive the requirement that schools follow certain nutritional requirements in their school lunches, requirements that first lady Michelle Obama has been a strong supporter of.

=== Commerce, Justice, Science, and Related Agencies ===
The Commerce, Justice, Science, and Related Agencies Appropriations Act, 2015 (H.R. 4660; 113th Congress) would appropriate $51.2 billion, approximately $400 million less than fiscal year 2014. The bill would fund the United States Department of Commerce, the United States Department of Justice, and various related agencies. Those related agencies included the Office of Science and Technology Policy, the National Aeronautics and Space Administration (NASA), the National Science Foundation (NSF), the Commission on Civil Rights, the Equal Employment Opportunity Commission (EEOC), the International Trade Commission, the Legal Services Corporation, the Marine Mammal Commission, the Office of the United States Trade Representative, and the State Justice Institute.

The Senate amended H.R. 4660 to use it as a legislative vehicle for a "minibus" bill that would appropriate funding for the United States Department of Agriculture, the United States Department of Transportation, and the United States Department of Housing and Urban Development, as well as the Departments of Commerce and Justice covered by the original House bill. The bill would appropriate $120 billion total for all of those agencies.

=== Department of Defense ===
The Department of Defense Appropriations Act, 2015 (H.R. 4870; 113th Congress) would provide funding for the United States Department of Defense for fiscal year 2015 of approximately $491 billion. The bill included a provision that forbade the transfer of Guantanamo Bay prisoners, a reaction to the controversial exchange of five prisoners in exchange for the return of Sergeant Bowe Bergdahl from the Taliban. Two amendments from Rep. Barbara Lee (D-CA) failed. The first would have prohibited the use of any funds for use with the Authorization for Use of Military Force Against Iraq Resolution of 2002 in order to give the Iraq War "an official, legal end." The amendment was voted down 31–17, with Rep. Frelinghuysen arguing that there were no funds devoted to Iraq in the bill and all the troops had left in 2011. Lee's second amendment would have required the executive branch to report to Congress on actions taken under the Authorization for Use of Military Force Against Terrorists from 13 years ago. This amendment was also defeated, 27–21, with Frelinghuysen arguing that it could give away classified information.

=== Energy and Water Development and Related Agencies ===
The Energy and Water Development and Related Agencies Appropriations Act, 2015 (H.R. 4923; 113th Congress) would make appropriations for energy and water development and related agencies for FY2015. The bill would appropriate $34 billion, which is only $50 million less than these agencies currently receive. The appropriations for the United States Department of Energy and the United States Army Corps of Engineers are made by this bill.

=== Financial Services and General Government ===
The Financial Services and General Government Appropriations Act, 2015 (H.R. 5016; 113th Congress) would make appropriations for the United States Department of the Treasury, the United States federal courts, the Executive Office of the President of the United States, and Washington, D.C. The bill would appropriate $21.285 billion. The Hill described this bill as "one of the most contentious of the annual 12 appropriations bills."

=== Legislative Branch ===
The Legislative Branch Appropriations Act, 2015 (H.R. 4487; 113th Congress) would appropriate $3.3 billion to the United States Congress for fiscal year 2015. The bill is considered one of the two easiest appropriations bills to pass each year. The House and Senate customarily defer to each other regarding each chamber's spending levels, so this bill only includes funding for the House and not the Senate.

=== Military Construction and Veterans Affairs and Related Agencies ===
The Military Construction and Veterans Affairs and Related Agencies Appropriations Act, 2015 (H.R. 4486; 113th Congress) would appropriate $71.5 billion to the United States Department of Veterans Affairs and for military construction, approximately $1.8 billion less than fiscal year 2014 due to a decrease in the need for military construction. The bill is considered one of the two easiest appropriations bills to pass each year.

=== Transportation, Housing and Urban Development, and Related Agencies ===
The Transportation, Housing and Urban Development, and Related Agencies Appropriations Act, 2015 (H.R. 4745; 113th Congress) would appropriate $17 billion to the United States Department of Transportation and $40.3 billion to the United States Department of Housing and Urban Development. It would spend $1.8 billion less than in fiscal year 2014. President Barack Obama and his administration strongly opposed the bill. The White House released a statement saying that the bill "fails to make needed investments in our Nation's infrastructure, provides insufficient support for critical housing programs for low-income Americans and the homeless, and includes objectionable language provisions."

== Legislation passed ==
On September 9, 2014, Rep. Hal Rogers introduced the Continuing Appropriations Resolution, 2015 a continuing resolution that would fund the federal government of the United States through December 11, 2014 by appropriating $1 trillion. This was necessary because the Senate had not passed any of the House's approved appropriations bills. On September 17, 2014, the House voted in Roll Call Vote 509 to pass the bill 319–108. On September 18, 2014, the United States Senate voted in Roll Call Vote 270 to pass the bill 78–22.

On December 11, 2014, the House passed the Consolidated and Further Continuing Appropriations Act, 2015, popularly called the "cromnibus" bill, combining an omnibus spending bill funding the federal government through October 2015, with a continuing resolution for the Department of Homeland Security through February 2015. The House passed a two-day continuing resolution (a "CR" for short) at the same time, to prevent a government shutdown until the Senate could take action.

On February 27, 2015, a one-week continuing resolution was passed just hours before the Department of Homeland Security was to shut down. The full-year appropriations bill was passed on March 3, after Republican House leadership dropped demands to attach provisions rolling back Obama's executive actions on immigration.

== History ==
Although writing and passing annual appropriations bill is a basic and essential task for Congress, it often fails to meet the appropriate deadlines. Between fiscal year 1977 and fiscal year 2014, Congress only passed all twelve regular appropriations bills on time in four years - fiscal years 1977, 1989, 1995, and 1997. Every other fiscal year since 1977 has required at least one continuing resolution.

In 2013, Congress failed to agree on any regular appropriations bills prior to the start of fiscal year 2014. An attempt was made to pass the Continuing Appropriations Resolution, 2014 (H.J.Res 59) prior to October 1, but the House and Senate could not agree on its provisions, leading to the United States federal government shutdown of 2013. The federal government resumed operations on October 17, 2013, after the passage of a continuing resolution, the Continuing Appropriations Act, 2014, that provided funding until January 15, 2014. On January 15, 2014, Congress passed another continuing resolution, H.J.Res. 106 Making further continuing appropriations for fiscal year 2014, to provide funding until January 18, 2014. Congress finally passed the Consolidated Appropriations Act, 2014, an omnibus appropriations bill, on January 17, 2014, to provide funding for the remainder of fiscal year 2014.

In reaction to the events of 2013, House Committee on Appropriations Chairman Hal Rogers stated that his goal is to pass all twelve regular appropriations bills for 2015 before Congress has a recess in August because he wants to avoid a similar situation. Senator Barbara Mikulski (D-MD) shared this goal of finishing all of the appropriations bills on time.

In debating whether Congress would succeed at this, analysts looked at several issues. On the one hand, Congress has successfully agreed on an overall spending level of $1.014 trillion as part of the Bipartisan Budget Act of 2013. There was also "pent-up demand in Congress to influence the actions of federal agencies through the setting of spending priorities." On the other hand, different parties controlled the House and the Senate.

As of May 29, 2014, Senator Mikulski had set the goal of having all of the annual appropriations bills reported by the Senate Appropriations Committee by July, an "aggressive timetable," and Senate Majority Leader Harry Reid (D-NV) had left two weeks open in both June and July for the consideration of appropriations bills. Republicans, however, have been upset with the strict limits that Reid has been placing on the amendment process and want open amendments on these appropriations bills. When the Senate began considering its first "minibus" bill, Senator John Thune (R-SD) said that "we'd like a process that at least allows us to get votes on amendments." Senator Roy Blunt (R-MO) also wanted a more open amendment process, saying that "as long as members are allowed to bring amendments as long as they want to, I'm certainly prepared to defend the (agriculture) portions of the bill." However, Republicans were not expecting an open amendment process being allowed by Senate Majority Leader Harry Reid.

The House began working on its sixth appropriations bill during the week of July 7, 2014. At that time, The Hill reported that "it remains likely that both chambers will ultimately pass a short-term measure in September to keep the government funded at current levels through the midterm elections," due to a stalled appropriations process in the Senate over a dispute about the amendment process.

== See also ==
- United States Senate Committee on Appropriations
- United States House Committee on Appropriations
- Authorization bill
- United States federal budget
- 2015 United States federal budget
