= Military Construction and Veterans Affairs and Related Agencies Appropriations Act, 2015 =

US Government Act

- Long title: Making appropriations for military construction, the Department of Veterans Affairs, and related agencies for the fiscal year ending September 30, 2015, and for other purposes.
- Announced in: the 113th United States Congress
- Sponsored by: Rep. John Culberson (R-TX)

Codification
- Appropriations: $71.5 billion

Legislative history
- Introduced in the House as H.R. 4486 by Rep. John Culberson (R-TX) on April 17, 2014; Committee consideration by United States House Appropriations Committee; Passed the House on April 30, 2014 (Roll Call Vote 187: 416-1)

The Military Construction and Veterans Affairs and Related Agencies Appropriations Act, 2015 (H.R. 4486) is a bill that would make appropriations for fiscal year 2015 for military construction and the United States Department of Veterans Affairs. The bill is considered one of the two easiest appropriations bills to pass each year. The total amount appropriated by the introduced version of the bill is $71.5 billion, approximately $1.8 billion less than fiscal year 2014 due to a decrease in the need for military construction.

The bill was introduced into the United States House of Representatives during the 113th United States Congress. It passed in the House on April 30, 2014, with a vote of 416–1.

== Background ==
An appropriations bill is a bill that appropriates (gives to, sets aside for) money to specific federal government departments, agencies, and programs. The money provides funding for operations, personnel, equipment, and activities. Regular appropriations bills are passed annually, with the funding they provide covering one fiscal year. The fiscal year is the accounting period of the federal government, which runs from October 1 to September 30 of the following year. The Military Construction and Veterans Affairs and Related Agencies Appropriations Act, 2015 is an example of a regular appropriations bill.

Appropriations bills are one part of a larger United States budget and spending process. They are preceded in that process by the president's budget proposal, congressional budget resolutions, and the 302(b) allocation. The U.S. Constitution (Article I, section 9, clause 7) states that "No money shall be drawn from the Treasury, but in Consequence of Appropriations made by Law..." This is what gives Congress the power to make these appropriations. The President, however, still has the power to veto appropriations bills.

The Military Construction and Veterans Affairs and Related Agencies Appropriations Act, 2015 falls under the jurisdiction of the United States House Appropriations Subcommittee on Military Construction, Veterans Affairs, and Related Agencies. The bill covers appropriations for military construction and for the United States Department of Veterans Affairs, but not most of the United States Department of Defense or its operations, which is handled separately. The House and Senate currently consider appropriations bills simultaneously, although originally the House went first. The House Committee on Appropriations usually reports the appropriations bills in May and June and the Senate in June. Any differences between appropriations bills passed by the House and the Senate are resolved in the fall.

In 2013, Congress was unable to pass all twelve appropriations bills (for fiscal year 2014) before October 1, 2013, when the new fiscal year. This led to the United States federal government shutdown of 2013. The shutdown lasted for 16 days. Finally, late in the evening of October 16, 2013, Congress passed the Continuing Appropriations Act, 2014, and the President signed it shortly after midnight on October 17, ending the government shutdown and suspending the debt limit until February 7, 2014. In reaction to this situation, House Committee on Appropriations Chairman Hal Rogers has stated that his goal is to pass all twelve regular appropriations bills for 2015 before Congress has a recess in August because he wants to avoid a similar situation. This bill is the earliest to be considered since 1974, according to the chairman.

== Provisions of the bill ==
This summary is based largely on the summary provided by the Congressional Research Service, a public domain source.

The Military Construction and Veterans Affairs and Related Agencies Appropriations Act, 2015 would appropriate funds for FY2015 for the United States Department of Defense (DOD) for: (1) military construction for the Army, Navy and Marine Corps, and Air Force (military departments), DOD, the Army and Air National Guard, and the Army, Navy, and Air Force reserves; (2) the North Atlantic Treaty Organization (NATO) Security Investment Program; (3) family housing construction and operation and maintenance for the military departments and DOD; (4) the Department of Defense Family Housing Improvement Fund; (5) DOD chemical demilitarization construction; and (6) the Department of Defense Base Closure Account.

The bill would appropriate funds for the United States Department of Veterans Affairs (VA) for: (1) the Veterans Benefits Administration, including for readjustment benefits, veterans insurance and indemnities, the Veterans Housing Benefit Program Fund, the Vocational Rehabilitation Loans Program Account, and the Native American Veteran Housing Loan Program Account; (2) the Veterans Health Administration; (3) the National Cemetery Administration; and (4) departmental administration, including for the Board of Veterans Appeals, the Veterans Benefits Administration, the Office of Inspector General, construction for major and minor projects, and grants for the construction of extended care facilities and veterans cemeteries.

The bill would appropriate funds for: (1) the American Battle Monuments Commission, (2) the U.S. Court of Appeals for Veterans Claims, (3) Army cemeterial expenses, and (4) the Armed Forces Retirement Home.

The bill would also specify restrictions and authorities regarding the use of funds appropriated in this Act.

=== Amendments ===
The House approved in a voice vote an amendment by Reps. Kyrsten Sinema (R-AZ) and Matt Salmon (R-AZ) that would transfer $1 million from the Office of General Administration to the Veterans Affairs inspector general's office instead. The money would be used to increase the size of the staff so that the inspector general's office could do a more thorough job of investigating allegations about a Phoenix, Arizona VA hospital that had a "secret waiting list" in order to misrepresent extended care delays. Earlier in April, the United States House Committee on Veterans' Affairs had stated that it was possible that these delays in Phoenix had caused 40 deaths. Salmon argued that "this is unconscionable."

Rep. Jim Costa (D-CA) offered an amendment that "would increase general operating expenses for veterans benefits administration by $10 million." This amendment was also adopted by a voice vote.

Rep. Raul Ruiz's (D-CA) amendment would provide funding for the VA to digitally scan records as it moves towards an electronic system. The House agreed to the $5 million amendment in a voice vote.

Rep. Keith Rothfus (R-PA) suggested an amendment, which was adopted, that would stop senior VA officials from getting any bonuses "in light of the nationwide delays for benefits to receive health and disability benefits." Rep. Sanford Bishop expressed the concern that this could make the VA a less desirable place to work. Bishop said that "this amendment will not provide any solution in the short term, and in fact may have long-term consequences and compound the very problems it attempts to address."

=== Spending amounts ===
- $158.2 billion on veterans programs
- $6.6 billion on military construction projects
- $45 billion for "VA medical services, such as mental health care, job training and suicide prevention efforts"
- $344 million "to modernize the VA's electronic health record system"

== Procedural history ==
The Military Construction and Veterans Affairs and Related Agencies Appropriations Act, 2015 was introduced into the United States House of Representatives on April 17, 2014, by Rep. John Culberson (R-TX), Chairman of the United States House Appropriations Subcommittee on Military Construction, Veterans Affairs, and Related Agencies. The United States House Appropriations Committee submitted House Report 113-416 about the bill. The bill was considered under an "open rule," which means that "any Member may offer an amendment that complies with the standing rules of the House and the Budget Act."

On April 30, 2014, the House voted in Roll Call Vote 187 to pass the bill 416–1.

== Debate and discussion ==
=== Failed amendments ===
Rep. Jim Moran (D-VA) offered an amendment that would remove the provision of the bill that "prohibits funding to construct any facility to house Guantanamo Bay detainees." Moran argued that allowing the government to spend money on building alternative places to house detainees would save the government money, help close down the facility, and end "a permanent scar on our judicial system." Rep. Culberson argued against the amendment, saying that "it's essential that this amendment be defeated in order to make sure our enemies are not given the protections of the Constitution."

Rep. Earl Blumenauer (D-OR) offered an amendment that would end the ban on VA hospital doctors talking to their patients about medical marijuana.

== See also ==
- List of bills in the 113th United States Congress
- 2015 United States federal budget - multiple proposed budgets for fiscal year 2015
- Military Construction and Veterans Affairs, and Related Agencies Appropriations Act, 2014 - bill that would have appropriated the funds for these same agencies, but for fiscal year 2014
- 2015 United States federal appropriations
