= Energy and Water Development and Related Agencies Appropriations Act, 2015 =

- Long title: Making appropriations for energy and water development and related agencies for the fiscal year ending September 30, 2015, and for other purposes.
- Announced in: the 113th United States Congress
- Sponsored by: Rep. Mike Simpson (R-ID)

Legislative history
- Introduced in the House as H.R. 4923 by Rep. Mike Simpson (R-ID) on June 20, 2014; Committee consideration by United States House Committee on Appropriations; Passed the House on July 10, 2014

The Energy and Water Development and Related Agencies Appropriations Act, 2015 (H.R. 4923) was a bill that would have made appropriations for energy and water development and related agencies for fiscal year 2015. The House version appropriated approximately $34 billion. The bill passed the House of Representatives but was not enacted as a standalone measure. Instead, Energy and Water Development funding for FY2015 was included as Division D of the Consolidated and Further Continuing Appropriations Act, 2015 (H.R. 83), which became Public Law 113-235 on December 16, 2014.

The bill was introduced into the United States House of Representatives during the 113th United States Congress.

== Background ==
An appropriations bill is a bill that appropriates (gives to, sets aside for) money to specific federal government departments, agencies, and programs. The money provides funding for operations, personnel, equipment, and activities. Regular appropriations bills are passed annually, with the funding they provide covering one fiscal year. The fiscal year is the accounting period of the federal government, which runs from October 1 to September 30 of the following year. The Energy and Water Development and Related Agencies Appropriations Act, 2015 is an example of a regular appropriations bill.

Appropriations bills are one part of a larger United States budget and spending process. They are preceded in that process by the president's budget proposal, congressional budget resolutions, and the 302(b) allocation. The U.S. Constitution (Article I, section 9, clause 7) states that "No money shall be drawn from the Treasury, but in Consequence of Appropriations made by Law..." This is what gives Congress the power to make these appropriations. The President, however, still has the power to veto appropriations bills.

The Energy and Water Development and Related Agencies Appropriations Act, 2015 falls under the jurisdiction of the United States House Appropriations Subcommittee on Energy and Water Development. The bill covers appropriations for the Department of Energy and the Army Corps of Engineers (Civil), as well as for a variety of related agencies. The House and Senate currently consider appropriations bills simultaneously, although originally the House went first. The House Committee on Appropriations usually reports the appropriations bills in May and June and the Senate in June. Any differences between appropriations bills passed by the House and the Senate are resolved in the fall.

In 2013, Congress was unable to pass all twelve appropriations bills (for fiscal year 2014) before October 1, 2013 when the new fiscal year. This led to the United States federal government shutdown of 2013. The shutdown lasted for 16 days. Finally, late in the evening of October 16, 2013, Congress passed the Continuing Appropriations Act, 2014, and the President signed it shortly after midnight on October 17, ending the government shutdown and suspending the debt limit until February 7, 2014. In reaction to this situation, House Committee on Appropriations Chairman Hal Rogers has stated that his goal is to pass all twelve regular appropriations bills for 2015 before Congress has a recess in August because he wants to avoid a similar situation.

== Provisions of the bill ==
This summary is based largely on the summary provided by the Congressional Research Service, a public domain source.

The Energy and Water Development and Related Agencies Appropriations Act, 2015 would make appropriations for energy and water development and related agencies for FY2015.

The bill would appropriate funds for FY2015 to the Department of the Army, Corps of Engineers-Civil, for: (1) civil functions pertaining to river and harbor, flood and storm damage reduction, shore protection, and aquatic ecosystem restoration (including the Mississippi River alluvial valley below Cape Girardeau, Missouri); (2) the regulatory program pertaining to navigable waters and wetlands; (3) the Formerly Utilized Sites Remedial Action Program for clean-up of early atomic energy program contamination; (4) flood control and coastal emergencies, including hurricanes and other natural disasters; and (5) the Office of Assistant Secretary of the Army (Civil Works).

The bill would make appropriations for FY2015 to the United States Department of the Interior for: (1) the Central Utah Project Completion Account; (2) the Bureau of Reclamation, including for water and related natural resources; (3) the Central Valley Project Restoration Fund; (4) California Bay-Delta Restoration; (5) administrative expenses in the Office of the Commissioner (the Denver office); and (6) offices in the five regions of the Bureau of Reclamation.

The bill would make appropriations for FY2015 to the United States Department of Energy (DOE) for energy and science programs, including: (1) energy efficiency and renewable energy, (2) electricity delivery and energy reliability, (3) nuclear energy, (4) fossil energy research and development, (5) naval petroleum and oil shale reserves, (6) the Elk Hills School Lands Fund, (7) the Strategic Petroleum Reserve (SPR) and the Northeast Home Heating Oil Reserve, (8) the Energy Information Administration, (9) non-defense environmental cleanup, (10) the Uranium Enrichment Decontamination and Decommissioning Fund, (11) science activities, (12) Nuclear Waste Disposal, (13) the Advanced Research Projects Agency-Energy (ARPA-E), (14) the Title 17 Innovative Technology Loan Guarantee Loan Program, (15) the Advanced Technology Vehicles Manufacturing Loan Program, (16) departmental administration, (17) the Office of the Inspector General, (18) the National Nuclear Security Administration and atomic energy defense weapons activities, (19) defense nuclear nonproliferation activities, (20) naval reactors activities, (21) Office of the Administrator in the National Nuclear Security Administration, (22) defense environmental cleanup, and (23) other defense activities.

The bill would approve expenditures from the Bonneville Power Administration Fund for the Black Canyon Trout Hatchery.

The bill would make FY2015 appropriations for operation and maintenance of: (1) the Southeastern Power Administration, (2) the Southwestern Power Administration, (3) the Western Area Power Administration, including construction and rehabilitation, (4) the Falcon and Amistad Operating and Maintenance Fund, and (5) the Federal Energy Regulatory Commission (FERC).

The bill would make FY2015 appropriations to: (1) the Appalachian Regional Commission; (2) the Defense Nuclear Facilities Safety Board; (3) the Delta Regional Authority; (4) the Denali Commission; (5) the Northern Border Regional Commission; (6) the Southeast Crescent Regional Commission; (7) the Nuclear Regulatory Commission (NRC), including the Office of Inspector General; and (8) the Nuclear Waste Technical Review Board.

The bill would prohibit the use of funds: (1) to conduct closure of adjudicatory functions, technical review, or support activities associated with the Yucca Mountain (Nevada) geologic repository license application; or (2) for actions that irrevocably remove the possibility that Yucca Mountain may be a repository option in the future.

The bill would set $0.00 as the amount by which the applicable allocation of new budget authority made by the United States House Committee on Appropriations exceeds the amount of proposed new budget authority under the Congressional Budget Act of 1974.

== Procedural history ==
The Energy and Water Development and Related Agencies Appropriations Act, 2015 was introduced into the United States House of Representatives on June 20, 2014 by Rep. Mike Simpson (R-ID). It was reported by the United States House Committee on Appropriations. The House was scheduled to debate the bill during the week of July 7, 2014, considering the bill under an open rule that allowed the submission of unlimited amendments. Morning debate was canceled on July 10 due to an asbestos leak on the House side of the United States Capitol building.

The House passed H.R. 4923 on July 10, 2014, by a vote of 253–170. The bill was received in the Senate on July 14, 2014, and referred to the Senate Committee on Appropriations, but no further action was taken on the standalone bill. Final FY2015 Energy and Water Development appropriations were enacted as Division D of the Consolidated and Further Continuing Appropriations Act, 2015 (H.R. 83), signed into law by President Obama on December 16, 2014 (Public Law 113-235).

On July 9, 2014, President Barack Obama threatened to veto the bill.

== Debate and discussion ==
President Barack Obama threatened to veto the bill, arguing that "the bill includes objectionable environmental riders that would prevent the use of funds to address known deficiencies and regulatory uncertainties related to Clean Water Act regulations that protect important aquatic resources while supporting economic development."

Some riders on the bill relate to Environmental Protection Agency (EPA) regulations. For example, the Army Corps of Engineers would be prevented from finalizing a rule regarding "fill material", the waste from mountaintop mining.

== See also ==
- List of bills in the 113th United States Congress
- 2015 United States federal appropriations
