= Legislative Branch Appropriations Act, 2015 =

United States legislation

- Long title: Making appropriations for the Legislative Branch for the fiscal year ending September 30, 2015, and for other purposes.
- Announced in: the 113th United States Congress
- Sponsored by: Rep. Tom Cole (R-OK)

Legislative history
- Introduced in the House as H.R. 4487 by Rep. Tom Cole (R-OK) on April 17, 2014; Committee consideration by United States House Committee on Appropriations; Passed the House on May 1, 2014 (Roll Call Vote: 402-14)

The Legislative Branch Appropriations Act, 2015 (H.R. 4487) is an appropriations bill that would make appropriations for the United States Congress for fiscal year 2015. No further action was taken on H.R. 4487 after its passage in the House; funding for the legislative branch for FY (fiscal year) 2015 was ultimately enacted in Division H of the Consolidated and Further Continuing Appropriations Act, 2015 (Pub.L. 113-235), signed on December 16, 2014.

The bill is considered one of the two easiest appropriations bills to pass each year. The bill would appropriate $3.3 billion to the legislative branch for FY 2015, which is approximately the same amount it received in FY 2014.

The bill was introduced in and passed in the United States House of Representatives during the 113th United States Congress.

== Background ==
An appropriations bill is a bill that appropriates (gives to, sets aside for) money to specific federal government departments, agencies, and programs. The money provides funding for operations, personnel, equipment, and activities. Regular appropriations bills are passed annually, with the funding they provide covering one fiscal year. The fiscal year is the accounting period of the federal government, which runs from October 1 to September 30 of the following year. The Legislative Branch Appropriations Act, 2015 is an example of a regular appropriations bill.

Appropriations bills are one part of a larger United States budget and spending process. They are preceded in that process by the president's budget proposal, congressional budget resolutions, and the 302(b) allocation. The U.S. Constitution (Article I, section 9, clause 7) states that "No money shall be drawn from the Treasury, but in Consequence of Appropriations made by Law..." This is what gives Congress the power to make these appropriations. The President, however, still has the power to veto appropriations bills.

The Legislative Branch Appropriations Act, 2015 falls under the jurisdiction of the United States House Appropriations Subcommittee on the Legislative Branch. The bill covers appropriations for the United States Congress and its related agencies. The House and Senate currently consider appropriations bills simultaneously, although originally the House went first. The House Committee on Appropriations usually reports the appropriations bills in May and June and the Senate in June. Any differences between appropriations bills passed by the House and the Senate are resolved in the fall.

In 2013, Congress was unable to pass all twelve appropriations bills (for fiscal year 2014) before October 1, 2013, when the new fiscal year. This led to the United States federal government shutdown of 2013. The shutdown lasted for 16 days. Finally, late in the evening of October 16, 2013, Congress passed the Continuing Appropriations Act, 2014, and the President signed it shortly after midnight on October 17, ending the government shutdown and suspending the debt limit until February 7, 2014. In reaction to this situation, House Committee on Appropriations Chairman Hal Rogers has stated that his goal is to pass all twelve regular appropriations bills for 2015 before Congress has a recess in August because he wants to avoid a similar situation.

== Provisions of the bill ==
This summary is based largely on the summary provided by the Congressional Research Service, a public domain source.

The Legislative Branch Appropriations Act, 2015 has multiple separate titles. Title I: Legislative Branch Appropriations would make appropriations to the House of Representatives for FY2015 for: (1) salaries and/or expenses of the House leadership offices, committees (including the Committee on Appropriations), and officers and employees; and (2) Members' representational allowances.

Section 101 would require deposit in the Treasury of any amounts of a Member's representational allowance remaining after all payments are made, to be used for federal deficit reduction, or, if there is no deficit, federal debt reduction.

Section 102 would prohibit the use of funds made available in this Act to deliver a printed copy of a bill, joint resolution, or resolution to the office of a Member of the House of Representatives unless the Member requests a copy.

Section 103 would prohibit the use of funds made available in this Act to deliver a printed copy of any version of the Congressional Record to the office of a Member.

Section 104 would prohibit the use of funds made available in this Act by the Chief Administrative Officer of the United States House of Representatives to make any payments from any Members' Representational Allowance for the leasing of a vehicle (except mobile district offices) in an aggregate amount that exceeds $1,000 for the vehicle in any month.

Section 105 would prohibit the use of funds made available in this Act to provide an aggregate number of more than 50 printed copies of any edition of the U.S. Code to all House offices.

The bill would make appropriations for salaries and/or expenses of: (1) the United States Congress Joint Economic Committee; (2) the United States Congress Joint Committee on Taxation; (3) the Office of the Attending Physician; (4) the Office of Congressional Accessibility Services; (5) the Capitol Police; (6) the United States Congress Office of Compliance; (7) the Congressional Budget Office (CBO); and (8) the Architect of the Capitol (AOC), including for the care and operation of Capitol buildings and grounds, House office buildings, the Capitol power plant, the Library of Congress buildings and grounds, the Capitol Police buildings, grounds, and security, the United States Botanic Garden, and the United States Capitol Visitor Center.

Section 1001 would bar the use of funds made available by this Act for scrims containing photographs of building facades during restoration or construction projects performed by the AOC.

The bill would appropriate funds for: (1) the Library of Congress for salaries and expenses, the United States Copyright Office, Congressional Research Service (CRS), and Books for the Blind and Physically Handicapped; (2) the Government Printing Office (GPO) for congressional printing and binding (including transfer of funds); (3) GPO for the Office of Superintendent of Documents (including transfer of funds); (4) the Government Printing Office Revolving Fund; (5) the Government Accountability Office (GAO) for salaries and expenses; and (6) a payment to the Open World Leadership Center Trust Fund.

Section 1101 would establish an upper limit of $203.058 million for the FY2015 obligational authority of the Library of Congress with regard to certain reimbursable and revolving fund activities.

Section 1201 would require the Comptroller General (GAO) to establish the Center for Audit Excellence within GAO to:

- build institutional auditing capacity; and
- promote good governance by providing affordable, relevant, and high-quality training, technical assistance, and products and services to qualified personnel and entities of governments (including federal, state, and local governments, tribal governments, and governments of foreign nations), international organizations, and other private organizations.

The bill would authorize GAO to:

- establish, charge, and collect fees (on a reimbursable or advance basis) for the training, technical assistance, and products or services; and
- accept and use conditional or non-conditional gifts of real and personal property and services (including services of guest lecturers) to support the Center's operation.

The bill would prohibit GAO from accepting or using such a gift if its acceptance or use would compromise or appear to compromise GAO's integrity.

The bill would express the sense of Congress that the center should be staffed primarily by GAO personnel not otherwise engaged in carrying out other GAO duties, so as to ensure that the center's operation will not have a negative impact on GAO's ability to maintain a consistently high level of service to Congress.

The bill would establish in the Treasury (as a separate GAO account) the Center for Audit Excellence Account consisting of fees deposited by GAO and such other amounts as may be appropriated under law.

The bill would make amounts in the Account available to GAO in amounts specified in appropriations Acts and without fiscal year limitation to carry out this Act.

The bill would authorize appropriations.

The bill would prohibit GAO from operating the center until:

- it submits a business plan for the Center to congressional appropriations committees; and
- each such committee approves the plan.

Title II: General Provisions would specify authorized and prohibited uses of funds appropriated by this Act identical or similar to corresponding provisions of the Legislative Branch Appropriations Act, 2014.

Section 206 would authorize the AOC to maintain and improve the landscape features, excluding streets, in specified grassy areas of Washington, DC, SW.

Section 208 would prohibit the use of funds made available to the AOC in this Act to eliminate or restrict guided tours of the U.S. Capitol led by congressional employees and interns.

The bill would allow temporary suspension or restriction of such tours for security or related reasons to the same extent as guided tours of the U.S. Capitol led by the AOC.

Section 209 would prohibit a Member of Congress from receiving a cost of living adjustment to his or her salary under the Legislative Reorganization Act of 1946 during FY2015.

Section 210 would establish a spending reduction account consisting of the amount by which each applicable allocation of new budget authority made by the House Committee on Appropriations, excluding Senate items, exceeds the amount of proposed new budget authority. Makes such amount $0 (increased by $3,166,946).

Section 211 would prohibit the use of funds made available by this Act to deliver to a Member's office a printed copy of:

- the report of disbursements for House operations, or
- the Daily Calendar of the House of Representatives prepared by the House Clerk.

=== Spending ===
- $488.6 million for the Architect of the Capitol
- $21 million for the final phase of the project to restore the Capitol Dome
- $347 million for the Capitol Police
- $595 million for the Library of Congress

== Procedural history ==
The Legislative Branch Appropriations Act, 2015 was introduced into the United States House of Representatives on April 17, 2014, by Rep. Tom Cole (R-OK). Cole is the chairman of the United States House Appropriations Subcommittee on the Legislative Branch. It was reported as an original measure by the United States House Committee on Appropriations. The corresponding report was report 113-417. On May 1, 2014, the House voted in Roll Call Vote 193 to pass the bill 402–14.

== Debate and discussion ==
The amount of money appropriated in this bill is 3.7% lower than President Barack Obama requested in his 2015 United States presidential budget request.

The House and Senate customarily defer to each other regarding each chamber's spending levels, so this bill only includes funding for the House and not the Senate. The legislation retains the freeze on member salaries that has existed since 2010. Hal Rogers, the Chairman of the House Appropriations Committee, said that "the House will continue to lead by example and hold the line on spending."

The Library of Congress and Librarian of Congress James Billington were praised for their work at digitalizing the library by Rep. Tom Cole (R-OK).

According to Rep. Cole, the bill meets its goals "in both an effective and efficient manner, and has done so in a genuinely bipartisan, inclusive and deliberative fashion."

== See also ==
- List of bills in the 113th United States Congress
- 2015 United States federal budget
- 2015 United States federal appropriations
