= Department of Defense Appropriations Act, 2015 =

- Long title: Making appropriations for the Department of Defense for the fiscal year ending September 30, 2015, and for other purposes.
- Announced in: the 113th United States Congress
- Sponsored by: Rep. Rodney Frelinghuysen (R-NJ)

Legislative history
- Introduced in the House as H.R. 4870 by Rep. Rodney Frelinghuysen (R-NJ) on June 13, 2014; Committee consideration by United States House Committee on Appropriations

The Department of Defense Appropriations Act, 2015 (H.R. 4870) is a United States appropriations law that provided funding for the United States Department of Defense for fiscal year 2015. The act appropriated approximately $491 billion and was enacted as part of the Consolidated and Further Continuing Appropriations Act, 2015.

== Background ==
An appropriations bill is a bill that appropriates (gives to, sets aside for) money to specific federal government departments, agencies, and programs. The money provides funding for operations, personnel, equipment, and activities. Regular appropriations bills are passed annually, with the funding they provide covering one fiscal year. The fiscal year is the accounting period of the federal government, which runs from October 1 to September 30 of the following year. The Department of Defense Appropriations Act, 2015 is an example of a regular appropriations bill.

Appropriations bills are one part of a larger United States budget and spending process. They are preceded in that process by the president's budget proposal, congressional budget resolutions, and the 302(b) allocation. The U.S. Constitution (Article I, section 9, clause 7) states that "No money shall be drawn from the Treasury, but in Consequence of Appropriations made by Law..." This is what gives Congress the power to make these appropriations. The President, however, still has the power to veto appropriations bills.

The Department of Defense Appropriations Act, 2015 falls under the jurisdiction of the United States House Appropriations Subcommittee on Defense. The bill covers appropriations for the Department of Defense. The House and Senate currently consider appropriations bills simultaneously, although originally the House went first. The House Committee on Appropriations usually reports the appropriations bills in May and June and the Senate in June. Any differences between appropriations bills passed by the House and the Senate are resolved in the fall.

In 2013, Congress was unable to pass all twelve appropriations bills (for fiscal year 2014) before October 1, 2013 when the new fiscal year. This led to the United States federal government shutdown of 2013. The shutdown lasted for 16 days. Finally, late in the evening of October 16, 2013, Congress passed the Continuing Appropriations Act, 2014, and the President signed it shortly after midnight on October 17, ending the government shutdown and suspending the debt limit until February 7, 2014. In reaction to this situation, House Committee on Appropriations Chairman Hal Rogers has stated that his goal is to pass all twelve regular appropriations bills for 2015 before Congress has a recess in August because he wants to avoid a similar situation.

== Provisions of the bill ==
- The bill appropriated $491 billion to the Defense Department. This amount was $200 million over what President Obama requested in his budget and $4.1 billion more than the fiscal year 2014 enact level.
- The Defense Department was prohibited to use any of the appropriated funds to move prisoners from the Guantanamo Bay detention camp in Cuba.
- The bill "cut of funding for arms deals with Russian corporation Rosoboronexport until" the Secretary of Defense can "certify the company has stopped transferring weapons into Syria."

== Procedural history ==
The Department of Defense Appropriations Act, 2015 was introduced into the United States House of Representatives on June 13, 2014 by Rep. Rodney Frelinghuysen (R-NJ). The bill was under the jurisdiction of the United States House Committee on Appropriations. It was scheduled to be considered on the House floor on June 18, 2014.

== Enactment ==
December 16, 2014 – The Department of Defense Appropriations Act, 2015 is enacted as Division C of the Consolidated and Further Continuing Appropriations Act, 2015, after passage by both the United States House of Representatives and the United States Senate.

December 16, 2014 – President of the United States Barack Obama signs the consolidated appropriations legislation into law as Public Law 113-235, funding the federal government through September 30, 2015.

== Debate and discussion ==
The provision of the bill that forbade the transfer of Guantanamo Bay prisoners was a reaction to the controversial exchange of five prisoners in exchange for the return of Sergeant Bowe Bergdahl from the Taliban.

=== Failed provisions ===
Rep. Barbara Lee (D-CA) offered two amendments in committee, both of which failed. The first would have prohibited the use of any funds for use with the Authorization for Use of Military Force Against Iraq Resolution of 2002. Lee said it was time to give the Iraq War "an official, legal end." The amendment was voted down 31-17, with Rep. Frelinghuysen arguing that there were no funds devoted to Iraq in the bill and all the troops had left in 2011. Lee's second amendment would have required the executive branch to report to Congress on actions taken under the Authorization for Use of Military Force Against Terrorists from 13 years ago. This amendment was also defeated, 27-21, with Frelinghuysen arguing that it could give away classified information.

== See also ==
- List of bills in the 113th United States Congress
- 2015 United States federal appropriations
