= Agriculture, Rural Development, Food and Drug Administration, and Related Agencies Appropriations Act, 2015 =

U.S. Congress appropriations bill

- Long title: Making appropriations for Agriculture, Rural Development, Food and Drug Administration, and Related Agencies programs for the fiscal year ending September 30, 2015, and for other purposes.
- Announced in: the 113th United States Congress
- Sponsored by: Rep. Robert Aderholt (R-AL)

Legislative history
- Introduced in the House as H.R. 4800 by Rep. Robert Aderholt (R-AL) on June 4, 2014; Committee consideration by United States House Committee on Appropriations

The Agriculture, Rural Development, Food and Drug Administration, and Related Agencies Appropriations Act, 2015 (H.R. 4800) is an appropriations bill for fiscal year 2015 that would provide funding for the United States Department of Agriculture and related agencies. The bill would appropriate $20.9 billion.

The bill was introduced into the United States House of Representatives during the 113th United States Congress.

== Background ==
An appropriations bill is a bill that appropriates (gives to, sets aside for) money to specific federal government departments, agencies, and programs. The money provides funding for operations, personnel, equipment, and activities. Regular appropriations bills are passed annually, with the funding they provide covering one fiscal year. The fiscal year is the accounting period of the federal government, which runs from October 1 to September 30 of the following year. The Agriculture, Rural Development, Food and Drug Administration, and Related Agencies Appropriations Act, 2015 is an example of a regular appropriations bill.

Appropriations bills are one part of a larger United States budget and spending process. They are preceded in that process by the president's budget proposal, congressional budget resolutions, and the 302(b) allocation. The U.S. Constitution (Article I, section 9, clause 7) states that "No money shall be drawn from the Treasury, but in Consequence of Appropriations made by Law..." This is what gives Congress the power to make these appropriations. The President, however, still has the power to veto appropriations bills.

The Agriculture, Rural Development, Food and Drug Administration, and Related Agencies Appropriations Act, 2015 falls under the jurisdiction of the United States House Appropriations Subcommittee on Agriculture, Rural Development, Food and Drug Administration, and Related Agencies. The bill covers appropriations for the Department of Agriculture, as well as for a variety of related agencies. The House and Senate currently consider appropriations bills simultaneously, although originally the House went first. The House Committee on Appropriations usually reports the appropriations bills in May and June and the Senate in June. Any differences between appropriations bills passed by the House and the Senate are resolved in the fall.

In 2013, Congress was unable to pass all twelve appropriations bills (for fiscal year 2014) before October 1, 2013, when the new fiscal year. This led to the United States federal government shutdown of 2013. The shutdown lasted for 16 days. Finally, late in the evening of October 16, 2013, Congress passed the Continuing Appropriations Act, 2014, and the President signed it shortly after midnight on October 17, ending the government shutdown and suspending the debt limit until February 7, 2014. In reaction to this situation, House Committee on Appropriations Chairman Hal Rogers has stated that his goal is to pass all twelve regular appropriations bills for 2015 before Congress has a recess in August because he wants to avoid a similar situation.

== Congressional Research Service report ==
This summary is based largely on the summary provided by the Congressional Research Service, a public domain source.

Agriculture, Rural Development, Food and Drug Administration, and Related Agencies Appropriations Act, 2015 - Title I: Agricultural Programs - Appropriates FY2015 funds for the following United States Department of Agriculture (USDA) programs and services: (1) Office of the Secretary of Agriculture (Secretary); (2) Office of the Chief Economist; (3) National Appeals Division; (4) Office of Budget and Program Analysis; (5) Office of the Chief Information Officer; (6) Office of the Chief Financial Officer; (7) Office of the Assistant Secretary for Civil Rights; (8) Office of Civil Rights; (9) agriculture buildings and facilities; (10) hazardous materials management; (11) Office of Inspector General; (12) Office of the General Counsel; (13) Office of Ethics; (14) Office of the Under Secretary of Agriculture for Research, Education, and Economics; (15) Economic Research Service; (16) National Agricultural Statistics Service; (17) Agricultural Research Service; (18) National Institute of Food and Agriculture; (19) Native American Institutions Endowment Fund; (20) extension and integrated activities; (21) Office of the Under Secretary for Marketing and Regulatory Programs; (22) Animal and Plant Health Inspection Service; (23) Agricultural Marketing Service; (24) Grain Inspection, Packers and Stockyards Administration; (25) Office of the Under Secretary for Food Safety; (26) Food Safety and Inspection Service; (27) Office of the Under Secretary for Farm and Foreign Agricultural Services; (28) Farm Service Agency; (29) Risk Management Agency; (30) Federal Crop Insurance Corporation Fund; and (31) Commodity Credit Corporation Fund.

Title II: Conservation Programs - Appropriates funds for the following: (1) Office of the Under Secretary for Natural Resources and Environment, and (2) Natural Resources Conservation Service.

Title III: Rural Development Programs - Appropriates funds for the following: (1) Office of the Under Secretary for Rural Development, (2) Rural Housing Service, (3) Rural Business-Cooperative Service, and (4) Rural Utilities Service.

Title IV: Domestic Food Programs - Appropriates funds for the following: (1) Office of the Under Secretary for Food, Nutrition and Consumer Services; and (2) Food and Nutrition Service.

Title V: Foreign Assistance and Related Programs - Appropriates funds for the following: (1) the Foreign Agricultural Service, (2) Food for Peace Act (P.L. 480) program title I and title II grants, (3) Commodity Credit Corporation (CCC) export loan credit guarantee program, and (4) the McGovern-Dole International Food for Education and Child Nutrition Program.

Title VI: Related Agencies and Food and Drug Administration - Appropriates funds for the following: (1) Food and Drug Administration (FDA), and (2) Farm Credit Administration (FCA).

Title VII: General Provisions - Specifies certain uses and limits on or prohibitions against the use of funds appropriated by this Act.

(Sec. 702) Authorizes the Secretary to transfer unobligated balances to the Working Capital Fund for plant and capital equipment acquisition, which shall remain available until expended.

(Sec. 703) Prohibits appropriations under this Act from remaining available for obligation beyond the current fiscal year unless expressly provided for.

(Sec. 704) Limits negotiated indirect costs on cooperative agreements between USDA and nonprofit organizations to 10%.

(Sec. 705) Makes USDA appropriations for direct and guaranteed loans available for: (1) the Rural Development Loan Fund program account, (2) the Rural Electrification and Telecommunication Loans program account, and (3) the Rural Housing Insurance Fund program account.

(Sec. 706) Prohibits funds made available to USDA under this Act from being used to acquire new information technology systems or significant upgrades without the approval of the Chief Information Officer and the concurrence of the Executive Information Technology Investment Review Board.

(Sec. 707) Makes funds available in the current fiscal year for agricultural management assistance under the Federal Crop Insurance Act and for specified conservation programs under the Food Security Act of 1985 until expended for current fiscal year obligations.

(Sec. 708) Makes eligible for economic development and job creation assistance under the Rural Electrification Act in the same manner as a borrower under such Act any former Rural Utilities Service borrower that has repaid or prepaid an insured, direct, or guaranteed loan under such Act, or any not-for-profit utility that is eligible to receive an insured or direct loan under such Act.

(Sec. 709) Rescinds specified funds from unobligated balances for the tree assistance program.

(Sec. 710) Makes unobligated balances for salaries and expenses for the Farm Service Agency and the Rural Development mission area under this Act available for information technology expenses through September 30, 2016.

(Sec. 711) Authorizes the Secretary to permit a state agency to use funds provided in this Act to exceed a specified maximum amount of liquid infant formula when issuing liquid infant formula to participants.

(Sec. 712) Prohibits first-class travel by employees of agencies funded under this Act.

(Sec. 713) States that with regard to certain programs established or amended by the Agricultural Act of 2014 to be carried out using CCC funds: (1) such funds shall be available for salaries and administrative expenses without regard to certain allotment and fund transfer limits, and (2) the use of such funds shall not be considered to be a fund transfer or allotment for purposes of applying such limits.

(Sec. 714) Limits funds made available in FY2015 or preceding fiscal years under P.L. 480 to reimburse the CCC for the release of certain commodities under the Bill Emerson Humanitarian Trust Act.

(Sec. 715) Limits funds available for USDA advisory committees, panels, commissions, and task forces.

(Sec. 716) Prohibits funds under this Act from being used to pay indirect costs charged against any agricultural research, education, or extension grant awards issued by the National Institute of Food and Agriculture that exceed 30% of total federal funds provided under each award.

(Sec. 717) Limits the use of funds for the:

- watershed rehabilitation program;
- environmental quality incentives program;
- agricultural conservation easement program;
- conservation stewardship program;
- biomass crop assistance program;
- rural energy for America program; and
- biorefinery, renewable chemical and biobased product manufacturing assistance program.

(Sec. 718) Limits FY2015 funds for the following domestic food assistance categories: (1) child nutrition program entitlement commodities, (2) state option contracts, and (3) defective commodity removal.

Limits funds for the fresh fruit and vegetable program until October 1, 2015.

Rescinds specified unobligated balances available in FY2015 for domestic food assistance.

(Sec. 719) Prohibits the use of funds for user fee proposals that fail to provide certain budget impact information.

(Sec. 720) Prohibits, without congressional notification, funds available under this Act or under previous appropriations Acts from being used through a reprogramming of funds to: (1) eliminate or create a new program, (2) relocate or reorganize an office or employees, (3) privatize federal employee functions, or (4) increase funds or personnel for any project for which funds have been denied or restricted.

Prohibits, without congressional notification, funds available under this Act or under previous appropriations Acts from being used through a reprogramming of funds in excess of $500,000 or 10%, whichever is less: (1) to augment an existing program, (2) to reduce by 10% funding or personnel for any existing program, or (3) that results from a reduction in personnel which would result in a change in existing programs.

(Sec. 721) Authorizes the Secretary to assess a one-time fee for any guaranteed business and industry loan that does not exceed 3% of the guaranteed principal portion of the loan.

(Sec. 722) Prohibits USDA or FDA funds from being used to transmit to any non-USDA or non-United States Department of Health and Human Services (HHS) employee questions or responses to questions that are a result of information requested for the appropriations hearing process.

(Sec. 723) Prohibits the use of funds under this Act by any executive branch entity to produce a prepackaged news story for U.S. broadcast or distribution unless it contains audio or text notice that it was produced or funded by such executive entity.

(Sec. 724) Requires USDA agencies to reimburse each other for employees detailed for longer than 30 days.

(Sec. 725) Prohibits funds under this Act from being used to provide nonrecourse marketing assistance loans for mohair.

(Sec. 726) Directs the Secretary, the FDA Commissioner, and the FCA Chairman to submit to Congress a spending plan by program, project, and activity for the funds made available under this Act.

(Sec. 727) Makes specified funds available for assistance to recipient nations only if adequate controls are in place to ensure that emergency food aid is received by the intended beneficiaries and not otherwise diverted.

(Sec. 728) Directs the Secretary to: (1) continue the pilot program in effect for FY2013 for packaging direct loans for single family rural housing, and (2) enter into additional agreements that increase the number of participating intermediary organizations to at least 10.

(Sec. 729) Authorizes the Secretary to increase by up to 25% the program level for certain loans and loan guarantees that do not require budget authority.

(Sec. 730) Prohibits the use of funds to write, prepare, or publish a final or interim rule in furtherance of the proposed USDA rule "Implementation of Regulations Required Under Title XI, of the Food, Conservation and Energy Act of 2008; Conduct in Violation of the Act" unless the combined annual cost to the economy of such rule does not exceed $100 million.

(Sec. 731) Declares that certain credit card refunds or rebates transferred to the Working Capital Fund: (1) shall not be made available for obligation without congressional notification and approval; but (2) shall be available for obligation only for the acquisition of plant and capital equipment necessary for the delivery of financial, administrative, and information technology services of primary benefit to USDA agencies.

(Sec. 732) Prohibits funds under this Act from being used for a project or program named for an individual serving as a Member, Delegate, or Resident Commissioner of the U.S. House of Representatives.

(Sec. 733) Provides that beginning with FY2014, losses under the supplemental agricultural disaster assistance program shall not be considered the "same loss" for purposes of the noninsured crop assistance program and the crop insurance program. (Thus making a loss eligible for benefits under the supplemental agricultural assistance program and the other programs.)

(Sec. 734) Provides that: (1) certain funds for the FDA shall not be available for obligation until the FDA finalizes a specified draft guidance; and (2) if the FDA fails to finalize such guidance by June 30, 2015, the funds shall be made available to assist federal, state, and local agencies combat the diversion and illegal sales of controlled substances.

(Sec. 735) Prohibits the use of funds under this Act to enter into specified transactions with, or provide a grant, loan or loan guarantee to, a corporation that was convicted of a felony criminal violation under any federal law within the preceding 24 months, where the awarding agency is aware of the conviction, unless the agency has considered suspension or debarment of the corporation and determined that such action is not necessary to protect the government's interests.

(Sec. 736) Prohibits the use of funds made available by this Act to enter into specified transactions with, or provide a grant, loan, or loan guarantee to, any corporation with any unpaid federal tax liability, for which all judicial and administrative remedies have been exhausted or have lapsed, and that is not being paid in a timely manner, where the awarding agency is aware of this unpaid tax liability.

Waives this prohibition if the agency has considered suspension or debarment of the corporation and determined that such an action is not necessary to protect the government's interests.

(Sec. 737) Limits funds available for repair or replacement of bulk fuel storage tanks in Alaska that are not in compliance with applicable federal or state law.

(Sec. 738) Prohibits funds under this Act from being used to exclude or restrict the eligibility of any variety of fresh, whole, or cut vegetables, except for vegetables with added sugars, fats, or oils, from being provided as supplemental foods under the special supplemental nutrition program for women, infants, and children (WIC).

(Sec. 739) Directs the Secretary to establish a process by which a state shall grant a compliance waiver for certain USDA regulations regarding nutrition standards in the national school lunch and school breakfast programs for the 2014–2015 school year to any school food authority located in a state that verifies a food service program net loss for a period of at least six months beginning on or after July 1, 2013.

(Sec. 740) Expresses the sense of Congress that Congress:

- celebrates May 8, 2014, as the 100th anniversary of the Smith-Lever Act and recognizes the significance of the establishment of a nationwide Cooperative Extension System;
- honors the university faculty and local educators who help people, families, youth, businesses, and communities solve problems, develop skills, and build a better future;
- thanks the volunteers who promote excellence for 4-H clubs, the master gardeners program, the family and consumer sciences program, and other Cooperative Extension System programs; and
- encourages collaboration among federal, state, and local governments to assure Cooperative Extension System sustainability.

(Sec. 741) Prohibits funds under this Act from being used to inspect horses for slaughter purposes.

(Sec. 742) Prohibits funds under this Act from being used to procure processed poultry products from China for the school lunch program, the child and adult food care program, the summer food service program for children, or the school breakfast program.

(Sec. 743) States that the amount by which the applicable allocation of new budget authority made by the House Committee on Appropriations (under the Congressional Budget Act of 1974) exceeds the amount of proposed new budget authority is $0.

== Procedural history ==
The Agriculture, Rural Development, Food and Drug Administration, and Related Agencies Appropriations Act, 2015 was introduced into the United States House of Representatives on June 4, 2014, by Rep. Robert Aderholt (R-AL). The bill was reported by the United States House Committee on Appropriations. The accompanying committee report was Report 113-468. The bill was considered by the House on June 11, 2014, under an open rule which meant that House members were allowed to offer as many amendments to the bill as they wanted.

== Debate and discussion ==
One provision of the bill would waive the requirement that schools follow certain nutritional requirements in their school lunches, requirements that first lady Michelle Obama has been a strong supporter of.

Rep. Peter Welch (D-VT) announced his intention to add an amendment to the bill that would stop the FDA from interfering with artisan cheese-makers who use wooden boards and shelves to age their cheese. According to Welch, the FDA's crackdown is "without evidence" and an example of "overreach."

An amendment offered by Rep Barbara Lee (D-CA) was accepted by voice vote. The amendment moves $8.1 million of funding from the Secretary of Agriculture's administrative budget to provide additional funding (now a total of $35 million) for a grant program to schools allowing them to buy equipment for making and serving breakfast to students. Lee argued that "the bottom line is breakfasts are very, very important to the growth, health and welfare and the development of our children."

== See also ==
- List of bills in the 113th United States Congress
- 2015 United States federal appropriations
