= Financial Services and General Government Appropriations Act, 2015 =

- Long title: Making appropriations for financial services and general government for the fiscal year ending September 30, 2015, and for other purposes.
- Announced in: the 113th United States Congress
- Sponsored by: Rep. Ander Crenshaw (R-FL)

Legislative history
- Introduced in the House as H.R. 5016 by Rep. Ander Crenshaw (R-FL) on July 2, 2014; Committee consideration by United States House Committee on Appropriations

The Financial Services and General Government Appropriations Act, 2015 (H.R. 5016) is an appropriations bill for fiscal year 2015 that would provide funding for the United States Department of the Treasury, as we all as the United States federal courts, the Executive Office of the President of the United States, and Washington, D.C.

The bill was introduced into the United States House of Representatives during the 113th United States Congress.

== Background ==
An appropriations bill is a bill that appropriates (gives to, sets aside for) money to specific federal government departments, agencies, and programs. The money provides funding for operations, personnel, equipment, and activities. Regular appropriations bills are passed annually, with the funding they provide covering one fiscal year. The fiscal year is the accounting period of the federal government, which runs from October 1 to September 30 of the following year. The Financial Services and General Government Appropriations Act, 2015 is an example of a regular appropriations bill.

Appropriations bills are one part of a larger United States budget and spending process. They are preceded in that process by the president's budget proposal, congressional budget resolutions, and the 302(b) allocation. The U.S. Constitution (Article I, section 9, clause 7) states that "No money shall be drawn from the Treasury, but in Consequence of Appropriations made by Law..." This is what gives Congress the power to make these appropriations. The President, however, still has the power to veto appropriations bills.

The Financial Services and General Government Appropriations Act, 2015 falls under the jurisdiction of the United States House Appropriations Subcommittee on Financial Services and General Government. The bill covers appropriations for the United States Department of the Treasury, as we all as the United States federal courts, the Executive Office of the President of the United States, and Washington, D.C. The House and Senate currently consider appropriations bills simultaneously, although originally the House went first. The House Committee on Appropriations usually reports the appropriations bills in May and June and the Senate in June. Any differences between appropriations bills passed by the House and the Senate are resolved in the fall.

In 2013, Congress was unable to pass all twelve appropriations bills (for fiscal year 2014) before October 1, 2013 when the new fiscal year. This led to the United States federal government shutdown of 2013. The shutdown lasted for 16 days. Finally, late in the evening of October 16, 2013, Congress passed the Continuing Appropriations Act, 2014, and the President signed it shortly after midnight on October 17, ending the government shutdown and suspending the debt limit until February 7, 2014. In reaction to this situation, House Committee on Appropriations Chairman Hal Rogers has stated that his goal is to pass all twelve regular appropriations bills for 2015 before Congress has a recess in August because he wants to avoid a similar situation.

== Provisions of the bill ==
This summary is based largely on the summary provided by the Congressional Research Service, a public domain source.

The Financial Services and General Government Appropriations Act, 2015 has multiple parts.

The Department of the Treasury Appropriations Act, 2015 would make appropriations for FY2015 for the United States Department of the Treasury.

The Executive Office of the President Appropriations Act, 2015 would make appropriations for FY2015 for the Executive Office of the President.

The Judiciary Appropriations Act, 2015 would make appropriations for FY2015 for the United States Supreme Court and other federal courts and related offices.

The District of Columbia Appropriations Act, 2015 would make appropriations for FY2015 for the District of Columbia.

The bill would make appropriations for FY2015 for: (1) the Administrative Conference of the United States, (2) the Consumer Financial Protection Bureau (CFPB), (3) the Consumer Product Safety Commission (CPSC), (4) the Federal Communications Commission (FCC), (5) the Federal Deposit Insurance Corporation (FDIC), (6) the Federal Election Commission (FEC), (7) the Federal Labor Relations Authority (FLRA), (8) the Federal Trade Commission (FTC), (9) the General Services Administration (GSA), (10) the Merit Systems Protection Board, (11) the National Archives and Records Administration (NARA), (12) the National Credit Union Administration (NCUA), (13) the Office of Government Ethics, (14) the Office of Personnel Management (OPM), (15) the Office of Special Counsel, (16) the Postal Regulatory Commission, (17) the Privacy and Civil Liberties Oversight Board, (18) the Recovery Accountability and Transparency Board, (19) the Securities and Exchange Commission (SEC), (20) the Selective Service System, (21) the Small Business Administration (SBA), (22) the United States Postal Service (USPS), and (23) the United States Tax Court.

The bill would specify certain uses and limits or prohibitions against the use of funds appropriated by this Act.

=== Amendments ===
The House accepted in a voice vote an amendment offered by Rep. Paul Gosar (R-AZ) to reduce funding for the Internal Revenue Service by $353 million.

== Procedural history ==
The Financial Services and General Government Appropriations Act, 2015 was introduced into the United States House of Representatives on July 2, 2014 by Rep. Ander Crenshaw (R-FL). It was reported as an original measure by the United States House Committee on Appropriations. The House began debating the bill on July 14, 2014, when it was brought to the House floor under an open rule, meaning that unlimited amendments were allowed. It passed the House 228-195 on July 17.

== Debate and discussion ==
Rep. Gosar, whose amendment cut some of the IRS' funding, said that it was "a modest reduction" and that "this agency has shown contempt for the American taxpayer." Rep. José E. Serrano (D-NY) objected, arguing that reducing the IRS' funding would be "counterproductive and result in weakened tax enforcement."

The Hill described this bill as "one of the most contentious of the annual 12 appropriations bills."

== See also ==
- List of bills in the 113th United States Congress
- 2015 United States federal appropriations
