= Rohrabacher–Farr amendment =

2014 U.S. federal legislation prohibiting interference with state medical marijuana laws

Commerce, Justice, Science, and Related Agencies Appropriations Act, 2015
- Other short titles: Consolidated and Further Continuing Appropriations Act, 2015
- Long title: An Act Making consolidated appropriations for the fiscal year ending September 30, 2015, and for other purposes.
- Nicknames: Rohrabacher–Farr Amendment; Rohrabacher–Blumenauer Amendment
- Effective: 2014-12-16

Citations
- Public law: Pub. L. 113–235 (text) (PDF)
- Statutes at Large: 128 Stat. 2130

Legislative history
- Signed into law by President Barack Obama on 2014-12-16

United States Supreme Court cases
- [Akimbo, LLC v. United States], No. 20-645, 594 U.S. (141 S. Ct.) ___ (2021) (statement of Thomas, J., respecting cert. denial) (citing United States v. McIntosh, 833 F.3d 1163, 1175–77 (9th Cir. 2016).)

The Rohrabacher–Farr amendment (also known as the Rohrabacher–Blumenauer amendment) is legislation introduced by U.S. Representative Maurice Hinchey in 2001, prohibiting the Justice Department from spending funds to interfere with the implementation of state medical cannabis laws. It passed the House in May 2014 after six previously failed attempts, becoming law in December 2014 as part of an omnibus spending bill. The passage of the amendment was the first time either chamber of Congress had voted to protect medical cannabis patients, and is viewed as a historic victory for cannabis reform advocates at the federal level. The amendment does not change the legal status of cannabis, however, and must be renewed each fiscal year in order to remain in effect.

== Legislative history ==
First introduced by Rep. Hinchey in 2001, the amendment was withdrawn before it could be brought to a vote. In 2003, Hinchey joined with Rep. Dana Rohrabacher to re-introduce the amendment, leading to a 152–273 defeat the first time the amendment was voted on. The Hinchey–Rohrabacher amendment failed five more times over the next decade, until it passed the House (as the Rohrabacher–Farr amendment) by a 219–189 vote on May 30, 2014, as an attachment to the Commerce, Justice, and Science Appropriations bill for fiscal year 2015. The amendment was then introduced in the Senate by Sens. Rand Paul and Cory Booker on June 18, but was not allowed a vote. In December, however, the amendment was inserted into the $1.1 trillion "cromnibus" spending bill during final negotiations, and the bill was signed into law by President Obama on December 16, 2014.

The Rohrabacher–Farr amendment passed the House for a second time on June 3, 2015, by a 242–186 margin. It was voted on by members of the Senate for the first time on June 11, 2015, winning approval in a 21–9 Senate Appropriations Committee vote led by sponsor Barbara Mikulski. The amendment remained in the FY 2016 omnibus appropriations bill that was signed into law by President Obama on December 18, 2015.

The Rohrabacher–Farr amendment was not voted on by the House in 2016, but did pass the Senate Appropriations Committee for a second time on April 21, 2016, by a 21–8 vote. The amendment was later renewed through a pair of spending bills signed into law on September 29 and December 10, and again for an additional week on April 28, 2017.

On May 5, 2017, the Rohrabacher–Farr amendment was renewed through September 30, 2017, as part of a $1 trillion spending bill signed into law by President Trump. In regards to the medical cannabis provision, Trump added a signing statement that read: "Division B, section 537 provides that the Department of Justice may not use any funds to prevent implementation of medical marijuana laws by various States and territories. I will treat this provision consistently with my constitutional responsibility to take care that the laws be faithfully executed." Days before the spending bill was signed into law, Attorney General Jeff Sessions wrote to congressional leaders urging that the Rohrabacher–Farr amendment not be renewed.

On July 27, 2017, the Senate Appropriations Committee approved inclusion of the Rohrabacher–Farr amendment in the CJS appropriations bill for fiscal year 2018, in a voice vote led by sponsor Sen. Patrick Leahy. On September 6, however, the House Committee on Rules blocked a vote on the amendment, due to Republican leadership viewing it as too divisive. The amendment was then renewed on September 8 as part of an emergency aid package, and again through a series of stopgap spending bills on December 8, December 22, January 22, and February 9. On March 23 the amendment was renewed as part of the FY 2018 omnibus spending bill, in effect through September 30, 2018.

On May 17, 2018, the House Appropriations Committee approved inclusion of the Rohrabacher–Farr amendment in the CJS appropriations bill for fiscal year 2019, in a voice vote led by sponsor Rep. David Joyce. The Senate Appropriations Committee followed on June 12 by approving a base CJS appropriations bill with the amendment included. The amendment was then renewed through a series of short-term spending bills signed on September 28, December 7, and January 25. On February 15 the amendment was renewed through the signing of the FY 2019 omnibus spending bill, effective through September 30, 2019. President Trump added a signing statement regarding the amendment similar to the one he added in May 2017.

On May 16, 2019, a House subcommittee released a base appropriations bill with the amendment included. On September 26 the Senate Appropriations Committee approved a base appropriations bill with the amendment included. On September 27 the amendment was renewed through a stopgap spending bill, and again on November 21. On December 20 the amendment was renewed through the signing of the FY 2020 omnibus spending bill, effective through September 30, 2020. President Trump added a signing statement regarding the amendment similar to the ones he added in May 2017 and February 2019.

In July 2020, a House subcommittee introduced a base appropriations bill with the amendment included. The amendment was then renewed through a series of stopgap spending bills on October 1, December 11, December 18, December 20, and December 22. On December 27 the amendment was renewed with the signing of the FY 2021 omnibus spending bill, effective through September 30, 2021.

In 2021, President Joe Biden became the first president to propose a budget incorporating the Rohrabacher–Farr amendment. The amendment was then renewed through a series of stopgap spending bills on September 30, December 3, February 18, and March 11. On March 15 the amendment was renewed through the signing of the FY 2022 omnibus spending bill, effective through September 30, 2022.

As of March 9, 2024, the Rohrabacher–Farr amendment is effective through September 30, 2024.

=== House votes ===
The Rohrabacher–Farr amendment has been introduced on the House floor nine times. It was known as the Hinchey–Rohrabacher amendment until Rep. Hinchey retired in January 2013, after which Reps. Dana Rohrabacher and Sam Farr took over as lead sponsor and co-sponsor. Rep. Farr then retired in January 2017 with Rep. Earl Blumenauer taking over as lead co-sponsor.

The vote totals for the amendment are as follows:

Year	Ayes	Noes	Not voting	Over-view	Roll call
2001	–	–	–	Link	–
2003	152	273	9	Link	Link
2004	148	268	17	Link	Link
2005	161	264	8	Link	Link
2006	163	259	10	Link	Link
2007	165	262	10	Link	Link
2012	163	262	6	Link	Link
2014	219	189	23	Link	Link
2015	242	186	4	Link	Link

The passage of the Rohrabacher–Farr amendment in 2014 was noted for its rare bipartisan support, garnering the approval of 49 Republicans and 170 Democrats. Among the notable "no" votes was DNC chair Debbie Wasserman Schultz, who was the only member of Democratic leadership to vote against it. The medical cannabis advocacy group Americans for Safe Access subsequently targeted Schultz with a TV ad criticizing her vote against the amendment.

The Rohrabacher–Farr amendment passed the House in 2015 with the support of 67 Republicans and 175 Democrats.

== Amendment text ==
The full text of the 2014 House amendment was as follows:

None of the funds made available in this Act to the Department of Justice may be used, with respect to the States of Alabama, Alaska, Arizona, California, Colorado, Connecticut, Delaware, District of Columbia, Florida, Hawaii, Illinois, Iowa, Kentucky, Maine, Maryland, Massachusetts, Michigan, Minnesota, Mississippi, Missouri, Montana, Nevada, New Hampshire, New Jersey, New Mexico, Oregon, Rhode Island, South Carolina, Tennessee, Utah, Vermont, Washington, and Wisconsin, to prevent such States from implementing their own State laws that authorize the use, distribution, possession, or cultivation of medical marijuana.

== Implementation ==
The Rohrabacher–Farr amendment became law in December 2014, but initially failed to have its intended impact, due to the Justice Department interpreting the amendment in an incorrect manner (as later determined by a pair of court rulings). Contrary to the amendment's popular interpretation, the DOJ argued that only state officials were protected from prosecution, and not private individuals or entities involved in the production or distribution of medical cannabis. Since state officials were not being prosecuted to begin with, the DOJ's position was essentially that the amendment had no effect. This stance conflicted with the DOJ's earlier position (leading up to the May 2014 vote), when it advised members of Congress that the amendment's protections could actually apply more broadly than intended, to cover recreational cannabis as well.

After the amendment's enactment, DOJ enforcement efforts continued (per the new interpretation) against medical cannabis providers who were following state law. These prosecutions drew protests from Rohrabacher and others, who charged that both the letter and the spirit of the amendment were being violated. The DOJ publicly addressed the matter for the first time in April 2015, when a spokesperson confirmed the much more narrow interpretation of the amendment that was being employed. In response, both Rohrabacher and Farr strongly denounced the interpretation, and a letter was sent to Attorney General Eric Holder demanding an end to the prosecutions. A letter was also sent to Inspector General Michael Horowitz in July 2015, seeking a government investigation into the matter.

In October 2015, a court ruling by U.S. District Judge Charles Breyer affirmed the meaning of Rohrabacher–Farr as its authors intended, providing supporters of the amendment with a key legal victory. Judge Breyer in his decision was especially critical of the DOJ interpretation, stating that it "defies language and logic" and "tortures the plain meaning of the statute", and was "counterintuitive and opportunistic". The ruling lifted an injunction against a California dispensary, the Marin Alliance for Medical Marijuana, and was considered to set important legal precedent inhibiting future prosecutions. The Justice Department appealed Breyer's ruling, but in April 2016 it withdrew the appeal. In August 2016, the DOJ interpretation was rejected by the Ninth Circuit Court of Appeals as well, in a separate case consolidating the appeals of 10 medical cannabis providers in the states of California and Washington. The unanimous ruling of the three-judge panel is binding on the nine western states of the Ninth Circuit, and is considered likely to hold influence on other circuit courts.
