= Commerce, Justice, Science, and Related Agencies Appropriations Act, 2015 =

- Long title: Making appropriations for the Departments of Commerce and Justice, Science, and Related Agencies for the fiscal year ending September 30, 2015, and for other purposes.
- Announced in: the 113th United States Congress
- Sponsored by: Rep. Frank Wolf (R-VA)

Codification
- Agencies affected: United States Department of Commerce, United States Department of Justice, Office of Science and Technology Policy, National Aeronautics and Space Administration, National Science Foundation, Commission on Civil Rights, Equal Employment Opportunity Commission, International Trade Commission, Legal Services Corporation, Marine Mammal Commission, Office of the United States Trade Representative, State Justice Institute

Legislative history
- Introduced in the House as H.R. 4660 by Rep. Frank Wolf (R-VA) on May 15, 2014; Committee consideration by United States House Committee on Appropriations; Passed the House on May 30, 2014 (Roll Call Vote 269: 321-87)

The Commerce, Justice, Science, and Related Agencies Appropriations Act, 2015 (H.R. 4660) is an appropriations bill that would fund the United States Department of Commerce, the United States Department of Justice, and various related agencies. Those agencies included the Office of Science and Technology Policy, the National Aeronautics and Space Administration (NASA), the National Science Foundation (NSF), the Commission on Civil Rights, the Equal Employment Opportunity Commission (EEOC), the International Trade Commission, the Legal Services Corporation, the Marine Mammal Commission, the Office of the United States Trade Representative, and the State Justice Institute. The total amount of money appropriated in the bill was $51.2 billion, approximately $400 million less than fiscal year 2014.

The bill was introduced in the United States House of Representatives during the 113th United States Congress. The bill passed in the House on May 30, 2014. The bill changed significantly, however, because Senate will be using H.R. 4660 as a legislative vehicle, amending it to contain the text of a "minibus" - a set of several appropriations bills in one.

== Background ==
An appropriations bill is a bill that appropriates (gives to, sets aside for) money to specific federal government departments, agencies, and programs. The money provides funding for operations, personnel, equipment, and activities. Regular appropriations bills are passed annually, with the funding they provide covering one fiscal year. The fiscal year is the accounting period of the federal government, which runs from October 1 to September 30 of the following year. The Commerce, Justice, Science, and Related Agencies Appropriations Act, 2015 is an example of a regular appropriations bill.

Appropriations bills are one part of a larger United States budget and spending process. They are preceded in that process by the president's budget proposal, congressional budget resolutions, and the 302(b) allocation. The U.S. Constitution (Article I, section 9, clause 7) states that "No money shall be drawn from the Treasury, but in Consequence of Appropriations made by Law..." This is what gives Congress the power to make these appropriations. The President, however, still has the power to veto appropriations bills.

The Commerce, Justice, Science, and Related Agencies Appropriations Act, 2015 falls under the jurisdiction of the United States House Appropriations Subcommittee on Commerce, Justice, Science, and Related Agencies. The bill covers appropriations for the Departments of Commerce and Justice, as well as for a variety of agencies with a scientific emphasis. The House and Senate currently consider appropriations bills simultaneously, although originally the House went first. The House Committee on Appropriations usually reports the appropriations bills in May and June and the Senate in June. Any differences between appropriations bills passed by the House and the Senate are resolved in the fall.

In 2013, Congress was unable to pass all twelve appropriations bills (for fiscal year 2014) before October 1, 2013 when the new fiscal year. This led to the United States federal government shutdown of 2013. The shutdown lasted for 16 days. Finally, late in the evening of October 16, Congress passed the Continuing Appropriations Act, 2014, and the President signed it shortly after midnight on October 17, ending the government shutdown and suspending the debt limit until February 7, 2014. In reaction to this situation, House Committee on Appropriations Chairman Hal Rogers has stated that his goal is to pass all twelve regular appropriations bills for 2015 before Congress has a recess in August because he wants to avoid a similar situation. This bill is the earliest to be considered since 1974, according to the Chairman. The appropriations process for fiscal year 2015 was widely "viewed as Congress' best chance in years to pass and conference spending bills ahead of the October 1 start of the fiscal year."

== Provisions of the bill ==
=== Original House measure ===
- Approximately $2 billion worth of spending in the bill is directed at the Drug Enforcement Administration.
- NASA gets $17.9 billion, a $250 million increase over fiscal year 2014.
- The National Science Foundation gets $7.4 billion, an increase of $232 million.

==== Successful amendments ====
The House considered over 80 different amendments during two days of debate because the bill was brought to the floor under an open rule, a procedure that allows unlimited amendments.

- A $19.5 million increase in funding for the Federal Bureau of Investigation's (FBI) National Instant Criminal Background Check System. The system is supposed to stop people from selling guns to criminals and people who are mentally ill. The amendment was approved 260-145. Only four Democrats voted against the amendment. The National Rifle Association of America took no position on it.
- An amendment offered by Rep. Dana Rohrabacher (R-CA) was adopted 219-189 that would forbid the Justice Department from stopping states from implementing their own medical marijuana laws. According to Rohrabacher, "despite this overwhelming shift in public opinion" towards favoring medical marijuana, "the federal government continues its hard line of oppression against medical marijuana." Opponent Rep. John Fleming (R-LA) said that the amendment "will take away the ability of the Department of Justice to protect our young people."
- An amendment offered by Rep. Alan Grayson (D-FL) was adopted 225-183. The amendment would "prevent funds from being used to force journalists to reveal their sources." According to Grayson, "it is completely incongruous to say we have freedom of the press, but the federal government can subpoena your sources and put them and you in prison if you don't comply." Objections to the amendment focused on the fact that it was being suggested at 10:30pm and ought to be dealt with at a different time.
- An amendment offered by Rep. Sean Duffy (R-WI) was adopted 229-178 that would "prohibit the use of funds to relinquish the National Telecommunications and Information Administration's (NTIA) responsibility of assigning Internet domains." NTIA had oversight over the Internet Assigned Numbers Authority, an important Internet governance body. Duffy worried that "by relinquishing our core functions to a foreign body, I don't think we will retain the current system of the Internet and the current rights of freedom of speech that the Internet currently enjoys."
- An amendment from Rep. Steve King (R-IA) provides $5 million to the Department of Justice for their use to "investigate the Obama administration's release of illegal immigrants facing deportation who are also criminals."
- The Justice Department also received an additional $1 million to conduct a criminal investigation into the allegations about secret waiting lists being kept at Veterans Administration hospitals.

=== Senate minibus ===
The Senate amended H.R. 4660 to contain a "minibus" set of appropriations measures that included funding for the United States Department of Agriculture, the United States Department of Transportation, and the United States Department of Housing and Urban Development, as well as the Departments of Commerce and Justice covered by the original House bill. The bill would appropriate $120 billion.

== Procedural history ==
The Commerce, Justice, Science, and Related Agencies Appropriations Act, 2015 was introduced into the United States House of Representatives on May 15, 2014 by Rep. Frank Wolf (R-VA). the bill was reported as an original measure by the United States House Committee on Appropriations. The House voted on May 30, 2014 in Roll Call Vote 269 to pass the bill 321-87.

On June 17, the United States Senate voted to end debate on the motion to consider this bill in a vote of 95-3. The Senate will be using H.R. 4660 as a legislative vehicle, amending it to contain the text of a "minibus" - a set of several appropriations bills in one. The House passage of H.R. 4660 simplifies the process of the Senate amending the bill and then sending it back to the House for a conference committee to reconcile the two versions.

== Debate and discussion ==
=== Failed amendments ===
These are some of the failed amendments to the original House measure:

- Rep. Jared Polis (D-CO) offered an amendment, which failed 66-339, that would have reduced the Drug Enforcement Administration's funding by $35 million. Polis argued that the DEA did not need an increase in its current funding because it "doesn't have a growing enforcement workload, except in their own minds." Colorado had recently made marijuana legal.
- Rep. Jim Moran (D-VA) offered an amendment that would allow the federal government to move detainees from the Guantanamo Bay detention camp to places in the United States. The amendment, which would have struck portions of the bill the currently outlaw such transfers, failed in a vote of 169-230. According to Moran, "the political and legal expediency of the Guantanamo Bay detention center at is not worth the cost to American's reputation around the world." Opponents, such as Rep. Frank Wolf (R-VA), said that bringing the detainees to the United States would be dangerous.

=== Senate minibus ===
The appropriations bills that were combined to create the Senate's minibus bill did have Republicans support individually, but Republicans in the Senate objected to how the Democrats initially divided up the over $1 trillion in discretionary spending between the 12 regular appropriations bills. According to the Republicans, these allocations were dependent on budget "gimmicks" that were used to meet the requirements of the Bipartisan Budget Act of 2013.

Senator John Thune (R-SD) said that "we'd like a process that at least allows us to get votes on amendments." Senator Roy Blunt (R-MO) also wanted a more open amendment process, saying that "as long as members are allowed to bring amendments as long as they want to, I'm certainly prepared to defend the (agriculture) portions of the bill." However, Republicans were not expecting an open amendment process being allowed by Senate Majority Leader Harry Reid.

== See also ==
- List of bills in the 113th United States Congress
- 2015 United States federal appropriations
