= Transportation, Housing and Urban Development, and Related Agencies Appropriations Act, 2015 =

- Long title: Making appropriations for the Departments of Transportation, and Housing and Urban Development, and related agencies for the fiscal year ending September 30, 2015, and for other purposes.
- Nicknames: THUD
- Announced in: the 113th United States Congress
- Sponsored by: Rep. Tom Latham (R-IA)

Legislative history
- Introduced in the House as H.R. 4745 by Rep. Tom Latham (R-IA) on May 27, 2014; Committee consideration by United States House Committee on Appropriations; Passed the House on June 10, 2014 (Roll Call Vote 297: 229-192)

The Transportation, Housing and Urban Development, and Related Agencies Appropriations Act, 2015 (H.R. 4745 or "THUD") is an appropriations bill that would provide funding for the United States Department of Transportation and the United States Department of Housing and Urban Development (HUD) for fiscal year 2015.

The bill was introduced and passed in the United States House of Representatives during the 113th United States Congress. It is the fourth fiscal year 2015 appropriations bill to pass.

== Background ==
An appropriations bill is a bill that gives money to federal government departments, agencies, and programs. The money provides funding for operations, personnel, equipment, and activities. Regular appropriations bills are passed annually, with the funding they provide covering one fiscal year. The fiscal year is the accounting period of the federal government, which runs from October 1 to September 30 of the following year. The Transportation, Housing and Urban Development, and Related Agencies Appropriations Act, 2015, is an example of a regular appropriations bill.

Appropriations bills are one part of a larger United States budget and spending process. They are preceded in that process by the president's budget proposal, congressional budget resolutions, and the 302(b) allocation. The U.S. Constitution (Article I, section 9, clause 7) states that "No money shall be drawn from the Treasury, but in Consequence of Appropriations made by Law...". This is what gives Congress the power to make these appropriations. The President, however, still has the power to veto appropriations bills.

The Transportation, Housing and Urban Development, and Related Agencies Appropriations Act, 2015, falls under the jurisdiction of the United States House Appropriations Subcommittee on Transportation, Housing and Urban Development, and Related Agencies. The bill covers appropriations for the Departments of Transportation and Housing and Urban Development (HUD) and other related agencies. The House and Senate have considered appropriations bills simultaneously, although the House went first. The House Committee on Appropriations reports the appropriations bills in May and June and the Senate in June. Any differences between appropriations bills passed by the House and the Senate are resolved in the fall.

In 2013, Congress was unable to pass all twelve appropriations bills (for fiscal year 2014) before October 1, 2013, when the new fiscal year began. This led to the United States federal government shutdown of 2013. The shutdown lasted for 16 days. Finally, late in the evening of October 16, 2013, Congress passed the Continuing Appropriations Act, 2014, and the President signed it shortly after midnight on October 17, ending the government shutdown and suspending the debt limit until February 7, 2014. In reaction to this situation, House Committee on Appropriations Chairman Hal Rogers stated that his goal was to pass all twelve regular appropriations bills for 2015 before Congress was to go on recess in August of that year because he wanted to avoid a similar situation.

The fiscal year 2014 THUD bill never received a House floor vote. The vote was canceled at the last minute because the Republican leadership had determined that they did not have enough votes to pass the bill due to the objections of some Republicans to spending cuts in the bill.

== Major provisions ==
The bill would appropriate $17 billion to the Department of Transportation and $40.3 billion to the Department of Housing and Urban Development. It would spend $1.8 billion less than in fiscal year 2014.

Other specific appropriations include:

- $15.7 billion - Federal Aviation Administration
- $1.4 billion - Amtrak
- $6.2 billion - Community Planning and Development programs (a decrease of $383 million)

== Procedural history ==
The Transportation, Housing and Urban Development, and Related Agencies Appropriations Act, 2015 was introduced into the United States House of Representatives on May 27, 2014, by Rep. Tom Latham (R-IA). It was referred to the United States House Committee on Appropriations. It was reported with House Report 113-464. The bill was sent to the House floor under an open rule, which meant that members were allowed to offer as many amendments as they wanted, leading to almost 70 different amendments received consideration. On June 10, 2014, the House voted in Roll Call Vote 297 to pass the bill 229–192.

On June 9, 2014, President Barack Obama, who would eventually be required to sign the bill in order for it to become law, released a statement of strong opposition but did not threaten to veto it.

== Debate and discussion ==
President Barack Obama and his administration strongly opposed the bill. The White House released a statement saying that the bill "fails to make needed investments in our Nation's infrastructure, provides insufficient support for critical housing programs for low-income Americans and the homeless, and includes objectionable language provisions."

== See also ==
- List of bills in the 113th United States Congress
- 2015 United States federal appropriations
