= Making further continuing appropriations for fiscal year 2014 =

Funding measure in the United States

- Long title: Making further continuing appropriations for fiscal year 2014, and for other purposes.
- Announced in: the 113th United States Congress
- Sponsored by: Rep. Hal Rogers (R-KY)

Codification
- Acts affected: Continuing Appropriations Act, 2014
- Agencies affected: all federal agencies

Legislative history
- Introduced in the House as H.J.Res. 106 by Rep. Hal Rogers (R-KY) on January 10, 2014; Passed the House on January 14, 2014 (voice vote); Passed the Senate on January 15, 2014 (Recorded Vote 11 (2nd session): 86-14); Signed into law by President Barack Obama on January 15, 2014

The bill H.J.Res. 106 (long title "Making further continuing appropriations for fiscal year 2014, and for other purposes.") is a continuing resolution that was introduced into the United States House of Representatives during the 113th United States Congress and was signed into law on January 15, 2014 by President Barack Obama. The bill amended the Continuing Appropriations Act, 2014 to extend the time-period of funding provided by that continuing resolution from January 15, 2014 to January 18, 2014. The extension was intended to give Congress the extra time it needed to pass the Consolidated Appropriations Act, 2014 (H.R. 3547; 113th Congress), which would provide the rest of the appropriations for fiscal year 2014. The fiscal year in the United States is the 12-month period beginning on October 1 and ending on September 30 of the next calendar year.

== Background ==
The budget and spending process of the United States federal government is a complex one. The U.S. Constitution (Article I, section 9, clause 7) states that "No money shall be drawn from the Treasury, but in Consequence of Appropriations made by Law; and a regular Statement and Account of Receipts and Expenditures of all public Money shall be published from time to time." Traditionally, after a federal budget has been agreed upon in the spring before the upcoming fiscal year, Congress spends the summer writing and passing 12 regular appropriations acts.

In 2013, Congress was unable to agree on a budget, but several attempts were made to carry on with the regular appropriations process. The House passed the Military Construction and Veterans Affairs, and Related Agencies Appropriations Act, 2014 (H.R. 2216, June 4, 2013), the Department of Homeland Security Appropriations Act, 2014 (H.R. 2217, June 6, 2013), the Energy and Water Development and Related Agencies Appropriations Act, 2014 (H.R. 2609, July 10, 2013), the Department of State Operations and Embassy Security Authorization Act, Fiscal Year 2014 (H.R. 2848, September 29, 2013), and the Department of Defense Appropriations Act, 2014 (H.R. 2397, July 24, 2103). None of these bills passed in the Senate. All twelve regular appropriations bills were introduced in the House and the Senate, but these five were the only ones to receive a vote. Congress makes appropriations on a yearly basis. If no appropriations were made by October 1, 2013, when Fiscal Year 2014 began, the federal government would have to shut down due to lack of funding.

As October 1, 2013 approached, Congress worked on the Continuing Appropriations Resolution, 2014 (H.J.Res 59) (H.J.Res. 59), but was unable to pass the bill. The result was the United States federal government shutdown of 2013. After 16 days of a federal government shutdown, Congress was able to agree to a new continuing resolution, the Continuing Appropriations Act, 2014 (Pub. L. 113–46 (text) (PDF);H.R. 2775), which was passed, ending the shutdown. The bill funded the government until January 15, 2014, and suspended the U.S. debt ceiling until February 7, 2014.

As the January 15, 2014 deadline approached, Congress decided it would need extra time to prepare the Consolidated Appropriations Act, 2014 (H.R. 3547; 113th Congress), which would fund the government for the remainder of fiscal year 2014. They turned to this continuing resolution to extend the deadline.

== Provisions of the bill ==
This summary is based largely on the summary provided by the Congressional Research Service, a public domain source.

H.J.Res. 106 would amend the Continuing Appropriations Act, 2014 (Pub. L. 113–46 (text) (PDF)) to extend through January 18, 2014, specified continuing appropriations for FY2014.

== Procedural history ==
H.J.Res. 106 was introduced into the United States House of Representatives on January 10, 2014 by Rep. Hal Rogers (R-KY). The House voted on January 14, 2014 to pass the bill in a voice vote. The Senate voted on January 15, 2014, the pass the bill in Recorded Vote 11 (2nd session) with a vote of 86-14. President Barack Obama signed the bill later that day, making it law.

== Debate and discussion ==
Senator Barbara Mikulski (D-MD) urged fellow senators to vote for the bill "because it is a technical situation. This isn't the usual delay, drama, fiscal-cliff situation."

== See also ==
- List of bills in the 113th United States Congress
- Consolidated Appropriations Act, 2014 (H.R. 3547; 113th Congress)
