= Continuing Appropriations Resolution, 2015 =

- Long title: Making continuing appropriations for fiscal year 2015, and for other purposes.
- Announced in: the 113th United States Congress
- Sponsored by: Rep. Hal Rogers (R-KY)

Citations
- Public law: Pub. L. 113–164 (text) (PDF)

Legislative history
- Introduced in the House as H.J.Res. 124 by Rep. Hal Rogers (R-KY) on September 9, 2014; Committee consideration by United States House Committee on Appropriations, United States House Committee on the Budget; Passed the House on September 17, 2014 (Roll Call Vote 509: 319-108); Passed the Senate on September 18, 2014 (Roll Call Vote 270: 78-22); Signed into law by President Barack Obama on September 19, 2014

The Continuing Appropriations Resolution, 2015 (H.J.Res. 124; Pub. L. 113–164 (text) (PDF)) is a continuing resolution and United States public law that funded the federal government of the United States through December 11, 2014 by appropriating $1 trillion.

The bill was introduced into the United States House of Representatives during the 113th United States Congress.

== Background ==
A continuing resolution is a type of appropriations legislation. An appropriations bill is a bill that appropriates (gives to, sets aside for) money to specific federal government departments, agencies, and programs. The money provides funding for operations, personnel, equipment, and activities. Regular appropriations bills are passed annually, with the funding they provide covering one fiscal year. The fiscal year is the accounting period of the federal government, which runs from October 1 to September 30 of the following year. When Congress and the president fail to agree on and pass one or more of the regular appropriations bills, a continuing resolution can be passed instead. A continuing resolution continues the pre-existing appropriations at the same levels as the previous fiscal year (or with minor modifications) for a set amount of time. Continuing resolutions typically provide funding at a rate or formula based on the previous year's funding. The funding extends until a specific date or regular appropriations bills are passed, whichever comes first. There can be some changes to some of the accounts in a continuing resolution. The continuing resolution takes the form of a joint resolution, and may provide bridging funding for existing federal programs at current, reduced, or expanded levels.

== Provisions of the bill ==
This summary is based largely on the summary provided by the Congressional Research Service, a public domain source.

The Continuing Appropriations Resolution, 2015 would provide continuing FY2015 appropriations to federal agencies at the current annual rate until December 11, 2014, or specified conditions are met.

The bill would appropriate funds to federal agencies for continuing projects and activities at the rate and under the authority and conditions provided in the applicable divisions of the Consolidated Appropriations Act, 2014:

- the Agriculture, Rural Development, Food and Drug Administration, and Related Agencies Appropriations Act, 2014;
- the Commerce, Justice, Science, and Related Agencies Appropriations Act, 2014;
- the Department of Defense Appropriations Act, 2014;
- the Energy and Water Development and Related Agencies Appropriations Act, 2014;
- the Financial Services and General Government Appropriations Act, 2014;
- the Department of Homeland Security Appropriations Act, 2014;
- the Department of the Interior, Environment, and Related Agencies Appropriations Act, 2014;
- the Departments of Labor, Health and Human Services, and Education, and Related Agencies Appropriations Act, 2014;
- the Legislative Branch Appropriations Act, 2014;
- the Military Construction and Veterans Affairs, and Related Agencies Appropriations Act, 2014;
- the Department of State, Foreign Operations, and Related Programs Appropriations Act, 2014; and
- the Transportation, Housing and Urban Development, and Related Agencies Appropriations Act, 2014.

The bill would provide funding until whichever of the following first occurs: (1) enactment of an appropriation for any project or activity funded in this joint resolution, (2) enactment of the applicable FY2015 appropriations Act without any provision for the project or activity, or (3) December 11, 2014.

The bill would amend the Export-Import Bank Act of 1945 to extend the operating authority of the Export-Import Bank through June 30, 2015.

The bill would provide funding to the United States Department of Health and Human Services (HHS) and the Centers for Disease Control and Prevention (CDC) to respond to the outbreak of the Ebola virus in Africa.

The bill would amend the Omnibus Consolidated and Emergency Supplemental Appropriations Act, 1999 to extend the Internet Tax Freedom Act through December 11, 2014.

The bill would provide U.S. Customs and Border Protection and U.S. Immigration and Customs Enforcement with funding flexibility to sustain staffing levels, border security operations, and immigration enforcement activities.

The bill would specify additional changes to existing law and funding levels.

== Congressional Budget Office report ==
This summary is based largely on the summary provided by the Congressional Budget Office, a public domain source.

This resolution would provide funding through December 11, 2014, except for $88 million to respond to the Ebola virus, which would be available until September 30, 2015 (sections 136 and 137). In addition, section 147 would continue the authorization for the Export-Import Bank of the United States through June 30, 2015. All other amounts are shown on an annualized basis.

These amounts are subject to discretionary spending limits in the Balanced Budget and Emergency Deficit Control Act of 1985 as amended (The Deficit Control Act). The spending limits were established in the Budget Control Act of 2011 (Pub. L. 112–25 (text) (PDF)), which amended the Deficit Control Act. The spending limits for 2015 are $521,272,000 for the defense category and $492,356,000 for the nondefense category, for a total of $1,013,628,000.

== Procedural history ==
The Continuing Appropriations Resolution, 2015 was introduced into the United States House of Representatives on September 9, 2014, by Rep. Hal Rogers (R-KY). The bill was referred to the United States House Committee on Appropriations and the United States House Committee on the Budget. On September 17, 2014, the House voted in Roll Call Vote 509 to pass the bill 319–108. On September 18, 2014, the United States Senate voted in Roll Call Vote 270 to pass the bill 78–22.

President Barack Obama announced on September 17, 2014, that he supported the bill. He signed it into law on September 19, 2014.

== Debate and discussion ==
In the House, both support and opposition to the bill was bipartisan in nature. Voting in support of the bill were 143 Democrats and 176 Republicans, while 55 Democrats and 53 Republicans voted against it.

Some conservative Republicans opposed the reauthorization of the Ex-Im bank.

The ranking Democrat on the House Appropriations Committee, Rep. Nita Lowey (NY), said that she wanted to pass regular appropriations bills prior to the end of the 113th Congress in order to ensure that the 114th United States Congress did not get to set the appropriations levels, in case Congress was controlled by Republicans at that time.

The bill includes a 1 percent raise for federal employees in 2015.

Rep. Rogers, who introduced the bill, said that "this is a critical measure that ensures that hard-working Americans continue to have access to the government programs and services they rely on, and helps avoid the unnecessary uncertainty and economic harm caused by the threat of a government shutdown."

The bill was amended to include an authorization for the administration to train and arm Syrian rebels in order to better equip them to fight against the Islamic State of Iraq and the Levant (ISIL).

== See also ==
- List of bills in the 113th United States Congress
- 2015 United States federal appropriations
