= 2015 United States federal budget =

U.S. budget from October 1, 2014 to September 30, 2015

2015 Budget of the United States federal government
- Submitted: March 4, 2014
- Submitted by: Barack Obama
- Submitted to: 113th Congress
- Country: United States
- Total revenue: $3.34 trillion (requested) $3.249 trillion (actual); 18.2% of GDP
- Total expenditures: $3.90 trillion (requested) $3.688 trillion (actual); 20.6% of GDP
- Deficit: $564 billion (requested) $438.9 billion (actual); 2.45% of GDP
- Debt: $18.15 trillion (actual)
- GDP: $17.9 trillion (actual)
- Website: Office of Management and Budget

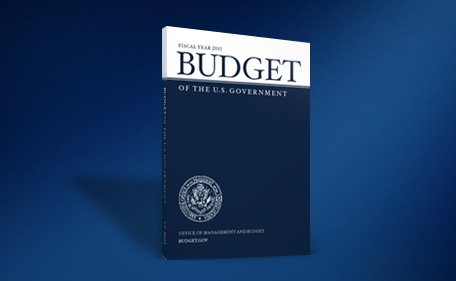
President Obama's Proposed Fiscal Year 2015 United States Federal Budget

The 2015 United States federal budget was the federal budget for fiscal year 2015, which runs from October 1, 2014 to September 30, 2015. The budget takes the form of a budget resolution which must be agreed to by both the United States House of Representatives and the United States Senate in order to become final, but never receives the signature or veto of the President of the United States and does not become law. Until both the House and the Senate pass the same concurrent resolution, no final budget exists. Actual U.S. federal government spending will occur through later appropriations legislation that would be signed into law.

The government was initially funded through a series of three temporary continuing resolutions. Final funding for the government with the exception of the Department of Homeland Security was enacted as an omnibus spending bill, the Consolidated and Further Continuing Appropriations Act, 2015, enacted on December 16, 2014. Homeland Security was funded through an additional two continuing resolutions, and its final funding was enacted on March 4, 2015 as the Department of Homeland Security Appropriations Act, 2015.

== Overview ==
According to the Congressional Research Service, the federal budget is "a compilation of numbers about the revenues, spending, and borrowing and debt of the government. Revenues come largely from taxes, but stem from other sources as well (such as duties, fines, licenses, and gifts). Spending involves such concepts as budget authority, obligations, outlays, and offsetting collections."

The process of creating a federal budget often publicly begins with the President's budget proposal, a spending request submitted to the U.S. Congress which recommends funding levels for the next fiscal year. The fiscal year in the United States is the 12-month period beginning on October 1 and ending on September 30 of the next calendar year. Current federal budget law (31 U.S.C. § 1105(a)) requires that the President submit his or her budget request between the first Monday in January and the first Monday in February. In recent times, the President's budget submission has been issued in the first week of February.

Congress can, and often does, work on its own proposals independently of the President. The congressional budget resolutions are under the jurisdiction of the United States House Committee on the Budget and the United States Senate Committee on the Budget. Traditionally, after both houses pass a budget resolution, selected representatives and senators negotiate a conference report to reconcile differences between the House and the Senate versions. The conference report, in order to become binding, must be approved by both the House and Senate. Because the budget resolution is a concurrent resolution, it is not signed by the President and "does not have statutory effect; no money can be raised or spent pursuant to it".

The budget does not determine the actual spending of the federal government. Instead, the budget establishes the amounts that appropriations subcommittees are allocated to spend (called 302(b) allocations) on the various agencies, departments, and programs within the purview of each. The twelve regular appropriations bills or, in their absence, a continuing resolution or omnibus spending bill, must be enacted by October 1 in order to fund the government, regardless of whether a budget resolution is ever agreed to in Congress. House rules allow the House to begin considering appropriation bills after May 15 whether a budget resolution has been agreed to or not.

== Budget proposals ==
=== Obama administration proposal ===
President Barack Obama submitted his fiscal year 2015 budget request on March 4, 2014. This budget proposal was one of several proposed budgets considered in the process of creating the 2015 United States federal budget. President Obama's proposed budget was for $3.9 trillion. President Obama's budget proposal was described as being full of "populist proposals" and as a "populist wish list." The proposal was not seen as a politically practical measure that would be used or taken seriously by Congress. The White House described this budget as "a budget he would implement in an ideal world."

The President's budget was formulated over a period of months with the assistance of the Office of Management and Budget, the largest office within the Executive Office of the President. The budget request includes funding requests for all federal executive departments and independent agencies for the following year. Budget documents include supporting documents and historical budget data and contains detailed information on spending and revenue proposals, along with policy proposals and initiatives with significant budgetary implications. In addition, each federal executive department and independent agency provides additional detail and supporting documentation on its own funding requests. The documents are also posted on the OMB website.

The budget the President submits was a request only. However, some people consider "the power to formulate and submit the budget... a vital tool in the President’s direction of the executive branch and of national policy." The President's budget request can influence the decisions made by Congress; the degree of influence changes based on political and fiscal factors. President Obama's budget proposal was a "comprehensive assembly of the White House's policy proposals and economic projections."

President Obama did not release his 2015 budget proposal until March 4, 2014, a delay he said was due to the need to wait for the Bipartisan Budget Act of 2013 to be agreed to in December 2013.

President Obama's budget proposal was described as being full of "populist proposals" and as a "populist wish list." Some of the populist programs include more spending on pre-school education, tax credits for childless low-income workers, and more than $1 trillion in new and higher taxes.

The President's proposal was also considered a "playbook" for Democrats' "election-year themes of creating jobs and narrowing the income gap between rich and poor."

According to Obama, his proposal adheres to the spending limits established by the Bipartisan Budget Act of 2013, but he also suggests an additional $55 billion worth of spending.

=== Scope of the budget proposal ===
President Obama's budget proposal only addresses about a third of the federal government's total estimated spending for fiscal year 2015. The federal government's total estimated spending would be $3.5 trillion, while Obama's budget only addresses $1.014 trillion. The difference was due to most government spending being non-discretionary spending for entitlement programs such as Social Security, Medicare, and Medicaid.

=== Specific policy proposals ===
==== Defense ====
The President's proposal calls for the United States Army to decrease in size to the smallest it has been since before World War II. The number of active-duty soldiers would drop from 490,000 today to 440,000 over the next five years. At the height of the Iraq War, there were about 570,000 soldiers. Obama's plan would also get rid of the A-10 airplane. The total military budget would be about $496 billion, which was the same amount as fiscal year 2014. The United States Department of Defense was asking in its budget to have some bases closed in 2017 and have a smaller pay increase for the troops.

==== Taxes ====
The President's proposal "would raise $651 billion by limiting tax deductions for the nation's highest earners" and by adding a "Buffett tax" that would set up minimum tax levies on the highest-earning Americans. Obama's budget would also increase the taxes on "large estates, financial institutions, tobacco products, airline passengers and managers of private investment funds."

The budget includes a proposal to tax large banks with $56 billion in "financial crisis responsibility fees."

==== Social programs ====
Obama proposes to increase from $500 to $1,000 the maximum earned income tax credit for childless low-income workers. Doing this would cost $116 billion over the next 10 years.

==== Education ====
Obama's proposal includes provisions involving universal pre-kindergarten, Head Start, and more Race to the Top grants. The proposed funding would pay for 100,000 new public school teachers. He also proposed capping the Public Service Loan Forgiveness program.

==== Budget savings ====
The President's plan states that the passage of his proposed immigration law, the Border Security, Economic Opportunity, and Immigration Modernization Act of 2013, would generate $158 billion worth of savings due to increased government revenues from taxing immigrants.

=== Political reactions ===
==== Support for the proposal ====
Explaining some of the choices he made in his budget proposal, President Obama said that "we've got to make a decision if we're going to protect tax breaks for the wealthiest Americans or if we're going to make smart investments necessary to create jobs and grow our economy and expand opportunity for every American."

==== Opposition to the proposal ====
Speaker of the House John Boehner (R-OH) called Obama's proposal "his most irresponsible budget yet," arguing that "American families looking for jobs and opportunity will find only more government in this plan." The Speaker also that said that "this budget is a clear sign this president has given up on any efforts to address our serious fiscal challenges that are undermining the future of our kids and grandkids."

Senator Jeff Sessions (R-AL), the ranking member on the Senate Budget Committee said that "it's disappointing that the president produced a campaign document instead of putting forth a serious budget blueprint that makes the tough choices necessary to get our fiscal house in order."

==== Expected impact ====
Reuters referred to the yearly requirement that the President submit a budget proposal as an "annual ritual," saying that as soon as it would be released, "lawmakers will promptly ignore it." However, the proposal does "highlight" policy proposals and allow Democrats to contrast their plans with those of Republicans.

The Associated Press reported that many of Obama's suggested new taxes have been ignored in the past by Congress, as have many of his ideas for increased spending. Due to the mid-term elections in November 2014 and the ongoing campaigns for re-election, Congress was not expected to act on many of Obama's proposals. Politico reported that "very little of it is expected to become law - or even be seriously considered via legislation on Capitol Hill."

Even the Obama Administration itself admitted that this budget proposal was not expected to be used to build a budget. Politico reported that "the White House isn't even pretending that this year's budget is a governing document" and that this was "a budget he would implement in an ideal world."

=== House Republican proposal ===
On April 1, 2014, House Budget Committee chairman Paul Ryan unveiled the Republican budget plan. The plan would cut $5 trillion in spending over 10 years, and envisions that increases in economic growth would increase tax revenue and balance the budget by 2024. Under the plan, 10-year military spending would increase by $483 billion, while nondefense discretionary spending would decrease by $791 billion. The budget would also repeal the Affordable Care Act, including reversing its expansion of Medicaid, and cap the food stamp program. Republicans had previously considered not drafting a budget plan because the Bipartisan Budget Act of 2013 was considered to have largely settled disputes about budget levels, but House conservatives had insisted that a plan be drafted that would support them in the upcoming 2014 elections. As of April 1, Senate democrats did not plan to draft their own budget. The Ryan plan used an accounting mechanism called dynamic scoring, which attempts to predict the macroeconomic fiscal impact of the policy changes, which was not typically included in budget proposals.

Newspaper The Hill called Ryan's proposal the "mainstream GOP budget," contrasting it to other Republican alternatives such as the budget proposal offered by the Republican Study Committee.

Rep. Jim McDermott (D-WA) criticized this proposal, saying "the Republican budget asks not what you can do for your country, but proclaims your country refuses to do a thing for you."

=== Other proposals ===
The Republican Study Committee offered their own budget proposal, one that would spend only $2.8 trillion. This budget proposal was defeated by a combination of all Democrats with 97 Republicans. The final vote total was 133–291. This budget proposal would balance the federal budget in four years, in comparison to the Ryan proposal, which balances in 10 years. The conservative advocacy group Heritage Action urged Representatives to vote for this budget, while Democrats argued that this proposal cut too much spending.

The Democratic Caucus in the House also offered their own budget proposal, one that was rejected in the House in a vote of 163–261 on April 10, 2014. The Democratic Caucus's budget proposal had 31 Democrats vote against it. The proposal would have spent $3.1 trillion in 2015 and was considered similar to the plan offered by President Obama. The plan had provisions to extend unemployment insurance for another year and raise the federal minimum wage to $10.10. Rep. Mick Mulvaney (R-SC) criticized the proposal, saying that Democrats are "encouraging us to borrow more, and borrow more, and borrow more, and never lay out any plan whatsoever for paying that money back to the children from whom we are borrowing it".

The Congressional Black Caucus's budget proposal would spend $3.26 trillion, reverting the cuts to food stamps and lengthening the time period over which people can receive unemployment insurance. Their proposal was voted against in a vote of 116–300. Of the six budget proposals that received votes in the House, this was the proposal that would have spent the most money in 2015.

The Congressional Progressive Caucus proposal would spend $3.2 trillion and included higher taxes on millionaires. It would also end the sequester. The House voted against this proposal 89–327 on April 9, 2014.

== Related fiscal legislation ==
The Continuing Appropriations Resolution, 2015 funded the government through a continuing resolution through December 11, 2014. On September 17, 2014, the House passed the bill 319–108, and on September 18, 2014, the United States Senate passed it 78–22.

On December 11, 2014, the House passed the Consolidated and Further Continuing Appropriations Act of 2015, popularly called the "cromnibus" bill, combining an omnibus spending bill funding the federal government through October 2015, with a continuing resolution for the Department of Homeland Security through February 2015. The House passed a two-day continuing resolution (a "CR" for short) at the same time, to prevent a government shutdown until the Senate could take action.

On February 27, 2015, a one-week continuing resolution was passed just hours before the Department of Homeland Security was to shut down. The full-year appropriations bill for Homeland Security was passed on March 3, after Republican House leadership dropped demands to attach provisions rolling back Obama's executive actions on immigration.

== Total revenues and spending ==
=== Receipts ===
(In billions of dollars):

Source	Requested	Enacted	Actual
Individual income tax	1,534	1,478	1,540
Corporate income tax	449	342	344
Social Security and other payroll tax	1,056	1,065	1,065
Excise tax	111	96	98
Customs duties	37	37	35
Estate and gift taxes	18	20	19
Deposits of earnings and Federal Reserve System	88	94	96
Allowance for immigration reform	2	-	-
Other miscellaneous receipts	43	45	50
Total	3,337	3,176	3,249

=== Outlays by budget function ===
These tables are in billions of dollars. A green cell represents an increase in spending, while a red one indicates a decrease in spending. Outlays represent funds actually spent in a year; budget authority includes spending authorized for this and future years.

Function	Title	2014 enacted	2015 Presidential request	2015 Republican proposal
050	National Defense	620.562	631.280	566.5
970	Overseas Contingency Operations*	620.562	631.280	52.6
150	International Affairs	48.472	50.086	39.0
250	General Science, Space and Technology	28.718	30.839	27.9
270	Energy	13.375	8.620	5.8
300	Natural Resources and Environment	39.102	41.349	39.3
350	Agriculture	22.659	16.953	19.5
370	Commerce and Housing Credit	-82.283	-31.430	-15.8
400	Transportation	95.519	97.825	80.7
450	Community and Regional Development	33.305	28.865	23.6
500	Education, Training, Employment and Social Services	100.460	117.350	91.8
550	Health	450.795	512.193	416.6
570	Medicare	519.027	532.324	519.4
600	Income Security	542.237	535.963	505.0
650	Social Security	857.319	903.196	892.0
700	Veterans Benefits and Services	151.165	158.524	153.0
750	Administration of Justice	53.102	55.843	54.3
800	General Government	22.407	25.706	23.6
900	Net Interest	223.450	251.871	267.3
920	Allowances	1.875	29.285	-521
930	Government-Wide Savings**	N/A	N/A	20.1
950	Undistributed Offsetting Receipts	-90.740	-95.653	-95.6
	Total	3650.526	3900.989	3165.6

* The Global War on Terror was broken out as a separate budget function in the House budget, but was included as part of National Defense in the Obama administration budget.

** Not included in the Obama administration budget.

Budget authority:

Function	Title	2014 enacted	2015 Presidential request	2015 Republican proposal
050	National Defense	613.619	636.642	528.9
970	Overseas Contingency Operations*	613.619	636.642	85.4
150	International Affairs	38.536	38.992	38.7
250	General Science, Space and Technology	29.356	29.307	27.9
270	Energy	8.384	7.276	4.2
300	Natural Resources and Environment	36.961	37.224	34.3
350	Agriculture	24.750	16.805	19.0
370	Commerce and Housing Credit	-61.420	-5.594	-4.3
400	Transportation	86.854	103.036	34.7
450	Community and Regional Development	17.858	43.452	14.6
500	Education, Training, Employment and Social Services	96.339	119.387	73.9
550	Health	448.150	522.827	419.8
570	Medicare	525.477	532.454	519.2
600	Income Security	546.912	537.399	505.7
650	Social Security	860.810	906.212	895.9
700	Veterans Benefits and Services	151.325	161.189	153.0
750	Administration of Justice	54.561	54.036	54
800	General Government	24.905	26.563	23.7
900	Net Interest	223.449	251.871	267.3
920	Allowances	7.500	45.644	-575
930	Government-Wide Savings**	N/A	N/A	25.9
950	Undistributed Offsetting Receipts	-90.740	-95.653	-95.6
	Total	3643.586	3969.069	3049.7

== See also ==
- United States budget process
- Appropriations bill (United States)
- 2014 United States federal budget
- Bipartisan Budget Act of 2013
- 2015 United States federal appropriations
