= Department of Homeland Security Appropriations Act, 2015 =

U.S. Congress bill

- Long title: Making appropriations for the Department of Homeland Security for the fiscal year ending September 30, 2015, and for other purposes.
- Announced in: the 114th United States Congress
- Sponsored by: Rep. Harold Rogers (R-KY)
- Number of co-sponsors: 0

Codification
- Acts affected: Homeland Security Act of 2002, National Flood Insurance Act of 1968, Robert T. Stafford Disaster Relief and Emergency Assistance Act, Federal Fire Prevention and Control Act of 1974, and others
- U.S.C. sections affected: 31 U.S.C. § 1105(a), 6 U.S.C. §§ 341–345, 6 U.S.C. § 121 et seq., 6 U.S.C. § 551(e)(1), 19 U.S.C. § 58c(f)(3), and others
- Agencies affected: United States Congress, United States Senate, United States House of Representatives, Government Accountability Office, Executive Office of the President, Office of Management and Budget, United States Department of Justice, Office of Personnel Management, General Services Administration, Central Intelligence Agency, Department of Homeland Security, United States Citizenship and Immigration Services, Department of Homeland Security Office of Inspector General, United States Coast Guard, United States Secret Service, U.S. Immigration and Customs Enforcement, Transportation Security Administration, U.S. Customs and Border Protection, Federal Law Enforcement Training Center, Federal Emergency Management Agency, Centers for Disease Control and Prevention, United States Department of Defense
- Appropriations: At least $60.9 billion

[H.R. 240 Legislative history]
- Introduced in the House as H.R. 240 by Rep. Harold Rogers (R-KY) on January 9, 2015; Committee consideration by United States House Committee on Appropriations, United States Senate Committee on Appropriations; Passed the House on January 14, 2015 (Roll Call 35: 236-191); Passed the Senate on February 27, 2015 (Senate Vote: 68-31-1); Agreed to by the House on March 3, 2015 (Roll Call 109: 257-167); Signed into law by President Barack Obama on March 4, 2015

The Department of Homeland Security Appropriations Act, 2015 (H.R. 240, Pub. L. 114–4 (text) (PDF)) is an appropriations bill that was introduced into the United States House of Representatives during the 114th United States Congress. The bill would appropriate money to various government agencies (primarily, but not exclusively) related to the United States Department of Homeland Security. This funding would be used during fiscal year 2015, which ended September 30, 2015.
