= State Justice Institute =

US federal grant-maker for state courts

The State Justice Institute (SJI) was established by federal law in 1984 to award grants to improve the quality of justice in state courts, and foster innovative, efficient solutions to common issues faced by all courts. SJI awards grants to improve judicial administration in the state courts of the United States. It was created under the State Justice Institute Act of 1984 (42 U.S.C. ch. 113, 42 U.S.C. § 10701 et seq.).

SJI is governed by an 11-member board of directors appointed by the U.S. president and confirmed by the U.S. Senate. The board includes six state court judges, one state court administrator, and four members of the public (no more than two of whom may be of the same political party).

The SJI Executive Director is responsible for the executive and administrative operations of SJI, is a non-voting ex officio member of the Board, and serves at the pleasure of the Board.

== See also ==
- Legal Services Corporation
