= National Appeals Division =

The National Appeals Division (NAD) of USDA was established by the Department of Agriculture Reorganization Act of 1994 (Title II of P.L. 103-354) to consolidate and improve the hearing procedures for USDA claims and disputes. The statute and regulations provide that certain sections of the Administrative Procedure Act (APA) (P.L. 79-404, as amended), including the hearing requirements, do not apply to NAD proceedings. The NAD procedures govern informal and formal hearings covering appeals of decisions made by the rural development agencies, Natural Resources Conservation Service, Risk Management Agency, and the Farm Service Agency. The statute and regulations set forth the procedures for hearings, requirements for the presiding officers, requirements for communications between the decision-maker and persons interested in the matter, and other important issues. After a decision is made by an Administrative Judge, both the appellant and the agency have the right to a review by the NAD director, who then issues a final determination. The final determination of the NAD is reviewable and enforceable by the U.S. District Court in accordance with the judicial review provisions of the APA.
