= Continuing Appropriations Act, 2014 =

United States funding law

- Long title: Making continuing appropriations for the fiscal year ending September 30, 2014, and for other purposes
- Announced in: the 113th United States Congress
- Sponsored by: Rep. Diane Black (R, TN-6)
- Number of co-sponsors: 103

Citations
- Public law: Pub. L. 113–46 (text) (PDF)

Legislative history
- Introduced in the House as H.R. 2775 by Rep. Diane Black (R, TN-6) on July 22, 2013; Committee consideration by United States House Committee on Energy and Commerce, United States House Committee on Ways and Means, United States House Energy Subcommittee on Health; Passed the House on September 12, 2013 (Roll Call Vote 458: 235-191); Passed the Senate as the Continuing Appropriations Act, 2014 on October 16, 2013 (Recorded Vote 219: 81-18) with amendment; House agreed to Senate amendment on October 16, 2013 (Roll Call Vote 550: 285-144); Signed into law by President Barack Obama on October 17, 2013

The Continuing Appropriations Act, 2014 (Pub. L. 113–46 (text) (PDF); H.R. 2775) is a law used to resolve both the United States federal government shutdown of 2013 and the United States debt-ceiling crisis of 2013. After the Republican-led House of Representatives could not agree on an originating resolution to end the government crisis, as had been agreed, the Democratic-led Senate used bill H.R. 2775 to resolve the impasse and to satisfy the Origination Clause requirement of Article One of the United States Constitution, which requires that revenue bills must originate in the House of Representatives. Traditionally, appropriation bills also originate in the House of Representatives.

The original bill, H.R. 2775, was introduced into the House of Representatives on July 22, 2013 as the No Subsidies Without Verification Act. It sought to declare that no premium tax credits or reductions in cost-sharing for the purchase of qualified health benefit plans under the Patient Protection and Affordable Care Act (PPACA, often informally known as "Obamacare") shall be allowed before the Secretary of Health and Human Services (HHS) certifies to Congress that there is a program in place, consistent with PPACA requirements, that verifies the household income and coverage requirements of individuals applying for such credits and cost-sharing reduction. The bill passed the House on September 12, 2013.

On October 16, 2013, the Senate amended the bill, renaming it the Continuing Appropriations Act, 2014, adding a continuing resolution to fund the government until January 15, 2014, and suspending the U.S. debt ceiling until February 7, 2014, in addition to other matters, while retaining the House's original PPACA verification provision. The Senate passed the bill that evening on an 81–18 vote. The House also passed it on the same day by a 285–144 margin, and President Barack Obama signed the bill shortly after midnight, on October 17.

== Original version ==
H.R. 2775 was originally introduced into the House of Representatives on July 22, 2013, under the name "No Subsidies Without Verification Act". The bill was only about a page long at that time (see the text as introduced).

H.R. 2775 would declare that no premium tax credits or reductions in cost-sharing for the purchase of qualified health benefit plans under PPACA shall be allowed before the Secretary of Health and Human Services (HHS) certifies to Congress that there is a program in place, consistent with PPACA requirements, that verifies the household income and coverage requirements of individuals applying for such credits and cost-sharing reduction. Section 1411 of the PPACA establishes requirements for a program to determine whether someone meets the income and coverage qualifications for such premium tax credits and cost-sharing subsidies (among other things).

The House passed this version of the bill on September 12, 2013.

CBO and the Joint Committee on Taxation (JCT) have estimated that the original H.R. 2775 would not affect direct spending or revenues. A program is currently being put in place to verify income and coverage qualifications for the tax credits and subsidies, and that program appears to CBO and JCT to be in accordance with section 1411. The CBO expects that the Secretary would certify before the beginning of 2014, when premium tax credits and cost-sharing subsidies would first be paid, that the requirements in H.R 2775 are satisfied.

Pay-as-you-go procedures (PAYGO) do not apply to the original H.R. 2775 because the bill would not affect direct spending or revenues in CBO and JCT's estimation. H.R. 2775 does not contain any intergovernmental or private-sector mandates as defined in the Unfunded Mandates Reform Act of 1995.

== Provisions of the final version ==
On October 16, 2013, the Senate significantly amended the bill, as follows:

- The Act includes a continuing resolution to fund the federal government until January 15, 2014. The funding level is the same, on a pro rata basis, as had been for the FY2013 year.
- The Act suspends the U.S. debt ceiling until February 7, 2014.
- The Act retains the original House PPACA requirement for verification, setting up a process that will verify the incomes of people who apply for health insurance subsidies. No other changes to PPACA were made.
- The two parties and two houses of Congress agreed to the creation of a joint budget conference to work on possible compromises and report back to Congress by December 13, 2013.
- The Act allows Congress to enact a "disapproval" resolution that would end the suspension of the debt ceiling. The same provision had been included in the previous suspension of the debt ceiling in the No Budget, No Pay Act of 2013.

The Act also made a number of further appropriations, not limited to the January 15, 2014 cutoff:

- The Act authorized back payment to the 800,000 government workers who were furloughed during the 16-day government shutdown.
- The United States Army Corps of Engineers received an authorization increase of $2.2 billion in funding to improve a series of locks and dams on the Illinois-Kentucky border.
- $450 million was allocated to help repair the damage in Colorado from the 2013 Colorado floods.
- The United States Department of the Interior was allocated $36 million and the United States Forest Service was allocated $600 million to cover fighting forest fires and their damage.
- Bonnie Lautenberg, the widow of Democratic Senator Frank Lautenberg (who died during 2013), was allocated a $174,000 death benefit.
- The Act extends the sunset date on the Federal Lands Recreation Enhancement Act by one year, to December 8, 2015.
- The Act does not block President Obama's proposal for a one percent pay increase for most federal civilian employees on January 1, 2014. The raise — which comes after a three-year federal pay freeze — was proposed by President Obama in August 2013, and according to existing law, automatically goes into effect unless blocked by Congressional budget legislation.

== Procedural history ==
H.R. 2775 was introduced in the House on July 22, 2013, by Rep. Diane Black (R, TN-6). It was referred to the United States House Committee on Energy and Commerce, the United States House Energy Subcommittee on Health, and the United States House Committee on Ways and Means. On September 12, 2013, the House voted in Roll Call Vote 458 to pass the bill 235-191.

On October 16, 2013, the Senate significantly changed the content of the original bill and changed the name of the bill to the Continuing Appropriations Act, 2014. The Senate passed the bill around 7:56 p.m., in Recorded Vote 219, with a vote of 81-18. Democrats supported the bill 54–0, while Republicans supported it 27–18. Those 18 Republicans against included Senators Ted Cruz, Rand Paul, and Marco Rubio, all considered potential Republican candidates for president in 2016.

The House voted around 10:18 p.m. on the same day in Roll Call Vote 550 to pass the new Senate version 285-144. Democrats supported the bill 198–0, while Republicans opposed it 87–144. Speaker of the House John Boehner allowed the vote to go forward, despite continued Republican opposition, in order to avoid default. This constituted a violation of the informal "Hastert Rule", which Boehner had previously tried to adhere to on this matter. Boehner, as well as House Majority Leader Eric Cantor and House Majority Whip Kevin McCarthy all voted in favor of it, while House Budget Committee Chair and 2012 Republican vice presidential nominee Paul Ryan voted against it. A bizarre moment occurred at the end of the vote when a stenographer for the House began shouting paranoid religious messages and had to be removed from the well.

President Obama signed the bill into law on October 17, 2013, at around 12:30 a.m.

== Debate and discussion ==
=== Debate about original version ===
The original bill was designed in response to hundreds of pages of regulations about Obamacare, which included a shift to an "honor system" for judging eligibility for Obamacare subsidies. After it was introduced, the White House released a statement indicating that the President will veto the bill if it was passed by Congress.

=== Debate about the final version ===
Some Republicans were unhappy with the final deal. Senator Cruz referred to the Senate bill as a "terrible deal." Two of the conservative organizations that had pushed for the attempt to defund the health law, Heritage Action and the Club for Growth, opposed it.

Republicans did not get a delay on the medical device tax, a concession they wanted that had been included in the Continuing Appropriations Resolution, 2014 (H.J.Res 59). Republicans also did not get a limitation on the U.S. Treasury Department's ability to enact "emergency measures" to avoid default once a debt ceiling limit is reached.

The inclusion of the dam monies for Kentucky brought on some criticism. Senate Minority Leader Mitch McConnell of Kentucky was a prime architect of the overall deal, and the Senate Conservatives Fund called the addition a "Kentucky Kickback". But Senate Majority Leader Harry Reid defended it as actually saving the federal government money overall. The Lautenberg bequest also attracted some attention as he had been one of the richest members of Congress.

=== After the deal ===
Following the conclusion of the deal that led to passage of the bill, Boehner said, "We fought the good fight. We just didn't win." Republican Senator Lindsey Graham commented, "This package is a joke compared to what we could have gotten if we had a more reasonable approach." President Obama said, "We've got to get out of the habit of governing by crisis."

The fact that the deal only pushed out the need for another continuing resolution or debt ceiling increase a few months, without resolving any of the fundamental underlying debates about the U.S. budget or debt, led a number of politicians and other observers to say that Congress was once again just "kicking the can down the road".

The federal government was opened again on October 17.

== See also ==
- List of bills in the 113th United States Congress
