= United States federal appropriations process =

Framework used by Congress and the President of the United States

The United States federal appropriations process is the annual course of action taken by Congress and the Executive branch to draft and authorize United States federal budget. The U.S. Constitution gives Congress primacy in this process, as Article I section 9 says that "No Money shall be drawn from the Treasury, but in Consequence of Appropriations made by Law."

Today's process was first established by the Budget and Accounting Act of 1921, and modified by the Congressional Budget and Impoundment Control Act of 1974, which created an independent process to prepare the budget that Congress still utilizes today. Congress first drafts a budget resolution in the House and Senate Budget Committees based on research and analysis from the Congressional Budget Office (CBO) after receiving the president's budget proposal. The resolution provides a broad guideline for the House and Senate Appropriations Committees and their respective subcommittees to refer to when drafting the 12 appropriations bills that fund the government. The 12 appropriations bills provide funding to federal agencies each fiscal year. Failure to pass the necessary appropriations legislation may result in a government shutdown.

== Background ==
Prior to 1974, Congress had no independent process for establishing the federal budget. Instead, based on the 1921 Budget and Accounting Act, Congress was supposed to adhere closely to the president's budget proposal when drafting the budget. When presidential impoundments became an issue under the Nixon administration, Congress passed the Congressional Budget and Impoundment Act in order to give Congress an independent and active role in establishing the federal budget and a way to limit presidential impoundments. The 1974 Act allowed Congress to deviate from the president's budget proposal and instead use expert analysis from the new Congressional Budget Office (CBO) that was established in 1974. The 1974 Act also created the House and Senate Budget Committees to oversee the budget process. Another major change to the budget process was the addition of the budget resolution. The budget resolution serves as a guideline for how much money Congress should appropriate based on fiscal analysis from the CBO. The budget resolution is drafted by the House and Senate Budget Committees and the resolution can start in either chamber. The budget resolution is a unique document within the appropriations process because although it must be passed by both the House and Senate, it does not need to be approved by the president because it is not a law. The budget resolution helps the House and Senate Appropriations Committees and the respective subcommittees that are in charge of the 12 appropriations bills propose the correct amount of funds to authorize for each federal agency.

== Annual process ==
=== Presidential budget proposal ===
The United States budget process begins when the President of the United States submits a budget request to Congress. The president is required by law to submit the budget request by the first Monday in February. The president's budget is formulated over a period of months with the assistance of the Office of Management and Budget (OMB), the largest office within the Executive Office of the President. The budget request includes funding requests for all federal executive departments and independent agencies. Budget documents include supporting documents and historical budget data and contains detailed information on spending and revenue proposals, along with policy proposals and initiatives with significant budgetary implications. The president's budget request constitutes an extensive proposal of the administration's intended revenue and spending plans for the following fiscal year. In addition, each federal executive department and independent agency provides additional detail and supporting documentation on its own funding requests. The documents are also posted on the OMB website..

=== Budget resolution ===
The budget resolution is passed by both the House of Representatives and the Senate, but is not presented to the president and therefore is not a law. The budget resolution establishes various budget totals, allocations, entitlements, and may include reconciliation instructions to designated House or Senate committees. In March, the CBO publishes an analysis of the president's budget requests. The CBO budget report and other publications are also posted on the CBO website. The CBO computes a current-law baseline budget projection that is intended to estimate what federal spending and revenues would be in the absence of new legislation for the current fiscal year and for the coming 10 fiscal years. However, the CBO also computes a current-policy baseline, which makes assumptions about, for instance, votes on tax cut sunset provisions. The current CBO 10-year budget baseline projection grows from $4.1 trillion in 2018 to $7.0 trillion in 2028. The budget committees consider the president's budget proposals in the light of the CBO budget report, and each committee submits a budget resolution to by April 1st. The House and Senate each consider these budget resolutions, and are expected to pass them, with amendments if needed, by April 15th.

=== Allocations ===
The 302(a) allocation specifies the total amount of money available to appropriate. They are generally included in the report accompanying the budget resolution, or if a budget resolution is not passed, each chamber may determine its own 302(a) allocation. This process was modified somewhat by the Budget Control Act of 2011, which is in effect through FY 2021, which sets two overall caps for defense and nondefense spending that the 302(a) allocation must adhere to. The Bipartisan Budget Act of 2018 and the Bipartisan Budget Act of 2019, also in effect through FY 2021, gave the chairs of the budget committees authority to determine 302(a) allocations. The 302(b) allocations specify how funds are divided among the individual appropriations subcommittees, corresponding to the 12 appropriations bills.

=== Budget functions ===
The budget resolution breaks down the federal budget into 19 categories known as budget functions. These functions include all spending for a given topic, regardless of the federal agency that oversees the individual federal program. Both the president's budget, and Congress' budget resolution provide summaries by function.

The table below lists the 19 budget functions.

Major Budget Functions
Number	Budget Function
050	National Defense
150	International Affairs
250	General Science, Space, and Technology
270	Energy
300	Natural Resources and Environment
350	Agriculture
370	Commerce and Housing Credit
400	Transportation
450	Community and Regional Development
500	Education, Training, Employment, and Social Services
550	Health
570	Medicare
600	Income Security
650	Social Security
700	Veterans Benefits and Services
750	Administration of Justice
800	General Government
900	Net Interest
920	Allowances

=== Appropriations bills ===
Appropriations bills are a form of discretionary spending because discretionary spending refers to any spending to fund federal government agencies. Discretionary spending requires annual appropriation bills, which are laws passed by Congress and signed by the president that allow federal agencies to spend money from the Treasury in order to fund their programs for the fiscal year. Discretionary spending is set by the House and Senate Appropriations Committees and their various subcommittees. This means that Congress can grant federal agencies "budget authority" through appropriations bills. There are 12 appropriations bills which need to be passed each fiscal year in order for Congress to continue to fund the government. Funds provided in appropriations bills are typically available for only one fiscal year, but Congress can also provide multi-year, and no-year (indefinite) funding in their appropriations bills.

The House and Senate Appropriations Committees start with allocations in the budget resolution and draft appropriations bills, which may be considered in the House after May 15th. Once the House and Senate Appropriations Committees finish drafting their bills, they are considered by the House and Senate. A conference committee is typically required to resolve differences between House and Senate appropriation bills. These 12 appropriations bills can either be passed using regular order, meaning that the 12 bills are voted on separately or via an omnibus, meaning that some or all 12 bills are packaged together and voted on as one big bill. Once an appropriation bill has passed both chambers of Congress, it is sent to the president, who may sign the bill or veto it. If the president signs, the bill becomes law. Otherwise, Congress must pass another bill to avoid a shutdown of at least part of the federal government. All 12 appropriations bills must be passed and signed into law by October 1st. A continuing resolution is often passed if an appropriations bill has not been signed into law by the end of the fiscal year.

The table below reflects the amount of money appropriated by Congress for each federal agency in fiscal year 2025.

Name	FY 2025 Amount Enacted
Agriculture	$26.6 billion
Commerce, Justice, and Science	$67.8 billion
Defense	$831.5 billion
Energy and Water	$58.1 billion
Financial Services and General Government	$15.9 billion
Homeland Security	$65 billion
Interior and Environment	$40.9 billion
Labor, Health and Human Services (HHS), and Education	$198.2 billion
Legislative Branch	$6.7 billion
Military Construction and Veterans Affairs (VA)	$146.6 billion
State and Foreign Operations	$56.8 billion
Transportation and Housing and Urban Development (HUD)	$86.4 billion

=== Reconciliation bills ===
The budget resolution may also specify that a reconciliation bill may be introduced by authorized committees to address other appropriations functions. A reconciliation bill cannot be filibustered in the Senate, only needs a simple majority to pass, and can only be debated for 20 hours before voting in the Senate. A reconciliation bill allows Congress to make changes to the federal spending, revenues, and the debt limit and can be passed through multiple or one omnibus bill package.

=== Apportionment ===
Apportionment is the process by which the Office of Management and Budget specifies the funding level for specific agencies and programs within the constraints of the appropriations bills after they have passed.

=== Authorization bills ===
In general, funds for federal government programs must be authorized before appropriations bills can he debated in the House. Then, through subsequent acts by Congress, budget authority is appropriated by the appropriations committees in the House. In principle, committees with jurisdiction to authorize programs make policy decisions, while the appropriations committees decide on funding levels, limited to a program's authorized funding level.

== Mandatory spending ==
Direct spending, also known as mandatory spending, refers to spending enacted by law, but not dependent on an annual or periodic appropriation bill. Most mandatory spending consists of transfer payments and earned benefits such as Social Security benefits, Medicare, and Medicaid. Many other expenses, such as salaries of federal judges, are mandatory, but account for a relatively small share of federal spending.

The table below shows mandatory spending outlays for fiscal year 2026.

Name	FY 2026 amount
Social Security Administration	$268 billion
Medicare	$176 billion
Veterans Benefits and Services	$64 billion

== See also ==
- Office of Management and Budget
- United States public debt
- Budget resolution
- Government financial statements
- Anti-Deficiency Act
- 2015 United States federal appropriations
