= 2014 United States federal budget =

2014 Budget of the United States federal government
- Submitted: April 10, 2013
- Submitted by: Barack Obama
- Submitted to: 113th Congress
- Country: United States
- Total revenue: $3.03 trillion (requested) $3.02 trillion (actual); 17.5% of GDP (actual)
- Total expenditures: $3.77 trillion (requested) $3.506 trillion (actual); 20.3% of GDP (actual)
- Deficit: $744 billion (requested); 4.4% of GDP (requested) $484.6 billion (actual); 2.8% of GDP (actual)
- Debt: $17.79 trillion (at fiscal end); 103.2% of GDP
- GDP: $17.244 trillion
- Website: Office of Management and Budget

The 2014 United States federal budget is the budget to fund government operations for the fiscal year (FY) 2014, which began on October 1, 2013 and ended on September 30, 2014.

President Obama submitted the FY2014 budget proposal on April 10, 2013, two months past the February 4 legal deadline due to negotiations over the United States fiscal cliff and implementation of the sequester cuts mandated by the Budget Control Act of 2011. The House of Representatives passed its proposal, H.Con.Res 25, prior to the submission of the President's budget proposal, as did the Senate (S.Con.Res 8). The House and Senate budget resolutions were not reconciled as a final budget.

At the time the fiscal year 2014 budget was debated, budgeting issues were controversial. Government spending had recently been limited by an automatic sequestration process that resulted when Congress and President Obama failed to meet spending reduction targets set by the Budget Control Act of 2011. The House and Senate were at the time controlled by different parties with different fiscal agendas.

Failure to pass an initial continuing resolution caused the 16-day-long federal government shutdown of 2013. The government was then temporarily funded through the Continuing Appropriations Act, 2014 and later a three-day Act. The House and Senate eventually compromised and passed the Bipartisan Budget Act of 2013. Final funding for the government was enacted as an omnibus spending bill, the Consolidated Appropriations Act, 2014, enacted on January 17, 2014.

== Budget proposals ==
=== House bill ===
2014 United States federal budget
- Long title: Establishing the budget for the United States Government for fiscal year 2014 and setting forth appropriate budgetary levels for fiscal years 2015 through 2023.
- Announced in: the 113th United States Congress
- Sponsored by: Rep. Paul Ryan (R-WI)
- Number of co-sponsors: 0

Codification
- Acts affected: Congressional Budget Act of 1974, Balanced Budget and Emergency Deficit Control Act of 1985, Federal Credit Reform Act of 1990, Health Care and Education Reconciliation Act of 2010, and others
- U.S.C. sections affected: 31 U.S.C. § 1105(a)

Legislative history
- Introduced in the House as H.Con.Res. 25 by Rep. Paul Ryan (R-WI) on March 15, 2013; Committee consideration by United States House Committee on the Budget; Passed the House on March 21, 2013 (Roll Call Vote 88: 221-207)

Budgetary caps in the House bill
Year	Revenues	Budget Authority	Outlays	Deficits (on-budget)	Debt Subject to Limit	Debt Held by the Public
2014	$2,270,932 million	$2,769,406 million	$2,815,079 million	-$544,147 million	$17,776,278 million	$12,849,621 million
2015	$2,606,592 million	$2,681,581 million	$2,736,849 million	-$130,257 million	$18,086,450 million	$13,069,788 million
2016	$2,778,891 million	$2,857,258 million	$2,850,434 million	-$71,544 million	$18,343,824 million	$13,225,569 million
2017	$2,903,673 million	$2,988,083 million	$2,958,619 million	-$54,947 million	$18,635,129 million	$13,362,146 million
2018	$3,028,951 million	$3,104,777 million	$3,079,296 million	-$50,345 million	$18,938,669 million	$13,485,102 million
2019	$3,149,236 million	$3,281,142 million	$3,231,642 million	-$82,405 million	$19,267,212 million	$13,648,470 million
2020	$3,284,610 million	$3,414,838 million	$3,374,336 million	-$89,726 million	$19,608,732 million	$13,836,545 million
2021	$3,457,009 million	$3,540,165 million	$3,495,489 million	-$38,480 million	$19,900,718 million	$13,992,649 million
2022	$3,650,699 million	$3,681,407 million	$3,667,532 million	-$16,833 million	$20,162,755 million	$14,154,363 million
2023	$3,832,145 million	$3,768,151 million	$3,722,071 million	$110,073 million	$20,319,503 million	$14,210,984 million

The House Budget Committee reported out the House Budget Bill (H.Con.Res. 25) on March 15, 2013 which was introduced and sponsored by budget committee chairman Paul Ryan (R-WI) to the United States House of Representatives. It passed the House on March 21, 2013, 221-207.

Along with setting forth the congressional budget for the federal government for fiscal year 2014, it proposed budget levels for fiscal 2015 through 2023 with respect to federal revenues, new budget authority, outlays, deficits, public debt, and debt held by the public. The proposed budget would also reform the U.S. tax code to create only two income tax brackets (with 10% and 25% tax rates), end the Alternative Minimum Tax, and reduce the corporate tax rate from 35% to 25%. The bill instructs the House Ways and Means Committee to reform the existing tax code by removing various tax credits and exemptions (which are unspecified in the bill itself). The bill would also repeal Obamacare by "eliminating the subsidized insurance exchanges and the Medicaid expansion that make up the core of the law," and would "convert Medicare into a system of private insurance plans financed by federal vouchers."

The bill received commentary from all sides of the political spectrum. The spending cuts found in the House Bill were supported by many Republicans. Tom McClintock (R-CA) supported the bill, noting that the Democrats' rival bill included too much new spending, putting the United States at risk of an economic crisis like the one found in Greece. Todd Rokita (R-IN) supported the spending cuts and accused the Democrats of stealing from future generations to pay for their deficit spending. Barbara Lee (D-CA) criticized the bill, renaming it from "Path to Prosperity" to "Path to Poverty," a reference to some of the bill's cuts to welfare program spending. The provision to alter the Medicare system by changing it into a voucher system for people under 55 was strongly criticized by Barbara Boxer (D-CA) on March 21, 2013, who claimed that older Americans would end up with higher out-of-pocket expenses for worse care (as a result of legislators giving up on fixing a dying system). The House Bill was also criticized by some Republican lawmakers for not going far enough to cut spending.

Due to the closer balance between the two parties in the House, the Republican leadership worked hard to limit the number of defections from conservative Republicans. It was voted on by the House of Representatives on March 21, 2013, and passed with a simple majority, 221-207. The 221 votes in favor of passage were all from Republicans. Of those voting, every Democrat voted against passage, along with 10 Republicans. The 10 Republican Representatives who voted against the House Bill were, Justin Amash (R-MI), Paul Broun (R-GA), Rick Crawford (R-AR), Randy Forbes (R-VA), Chris Gibson (R-NY), Phil Gingrey (R-GA), Joe Heck (R-NV), Walter Jones (R-NC), Tom Massie (R-KY), and David McKinley (R-WV) Some of these Representatives voted against the passage of the House Bill because they preferred the Republican Study Committee's budget instead. Representative McKinley voted against the budget because he objected to the cuts to Medicare, wanted to make changes to the foreign aid budget, and failed to exempt some bureaucracies (such as the Federal Bureau of Investigation) from budget cuts. Four members did not vote.

The Senate rejected the House budget on March 21, 2013 with a vote of 40-59 and continued to work on its own budget bill, (See Senate bill, below). Republicans such as Paul Ryan have argued that the two different bills clarify the differences between the two parties on issues of spending and balanced budgets.

=== Alternative House budget proposals ===
The Republican Study Committee budget would balance the Federal budget in four years, in part by freezing Federal spending after reducing discretionary spending to 2008 levels. The plan would also open the Arctic National Wildlife Refuge to drilling by oil companies and increase the age at which seniors became eligible for Social Security and Medicare. The budget failed in a vote of 104-132, with most Democrats not voting.

The Congressional Progressive Caucus budget contained several key features, most of them dramatically opposed to the main features of both the Republican Study Committee budget, and the budget proposed by Paul Ryan. The Congressional Progressive Caucus called for cutting Pentagon spending (back to 2006 levels), increased taxes on millionaires, the elimination of some subsidies (to oil and gas companies), and would increase unemployment insurance.

=== Senate bill ===
2014 United States federal budget
- Long title: Setting forth the congressional budget for the United States Government for fiscal year 2014, revising the appropriate budgetary levels for fiscal year 2013, and setting forth the appropriate budgetary levels for fiscal years 2015 through 2023.
- Announced in: the 113th United States Congress
- Sponsored by: Senator Patty Murray (D-WA)
- Number of co-sponsors: 0

Codification
- Acts affected: Congressional Budget Act of 1974, Balanced Budget and Emergency Deficit Control Act of 1985, Patient Protection and Affordable Care Act, American Taxpayer Relief Act of 2012, and others
- U.S.C. sections affected: 2 U.S.C. § 901(c), 31 U.S.C. § 1105, 2 U.S.C. § 633(a), 39 U.S.C. § 2009a, and others

Legislative history
- Introduced in the Senate as S.Con.Res. 8 by Senator Patty Murray (D-WA) on March 15, 2013; Committee consideration by United States Senate Committee on the Budget; Passed the Senate on March 23, 2013 (Vote 92: 50-49)

Budgetary caps in the Senate bill
Year	Revenues	Budget Authority	Outlays	Deficits	Public Debt	Debt Held by the Public
2013	$2,038,311 million	$3,054,195 million	$2,956,295 million	$917,984 million	$17,113,638 million	$12,274,763 million
2014	$2,290,932 million	$2,963,749 million	$2,997,884 million	$706,952 million	$18,008,333 million	$13,059,985 million
2015	$2,646,592 million	$3,046,506 million	$3,082,375 million	$435,783 million	$18,626,857 million	$13,588,003 million
2016	$2,833,891 million	$3,211,506 million	$3,240,376 million	$406,486 million	$19,222,298 million	$14,081,252 million
2017	$2,973,673 million	$3,386,445 million	$3,382,809 million	$409,137 million	$19,871,057 million	$14,574,683 million
2018	$3,111,061 million	$3,568,528 million	$3,542,197 million	$431,136 million	$20,558,744 million	$15,081,187 million
2019	$3,245,117 million	$3,779,446 million	$3,749,797 million	$504,680 million	$21,312,959 million	$15,669,625 million
2020	$3,400,144 million	$3,973,331 million	$3,926,818 million	$526,674 million	$22,094,877 million	$16,297,499 million
2021	$3,592,212 million	$4,136,110 million	$4,103,496 million	$511,283 million	$22,863,179 million	$16,929,319 million
2022	$3,800,500 million	$4,350,282 million	$4,323,224 million	$522,724 million	$23,634,787 million	$17,600,005 million
2023	$3,991,775 million	$4,492,138 million	$4,451,446 million	$459,672 million	$24,364,925 million	$18,229,414 million

The Senate budget resolution (S.Con.Res. 8) was introduced on March 15, 2013, the resolution was sponsored by Senator Patty Murray (D-WA). This was the first budget the Senate had itself proposed in 4 years. It called for $3.7 trillion in federal spending and increased taxes, and it anticipated government debt continuing to accumulate. Along with setting forth the congressional budget for the federal government for fiscal year 2014, it proposed budget levels for fiscal 2015 through 2023 with respect to federal revenues, new budget authority, outlays, deficits, public debt, and debt held by the public.

The Senate resolution also required Senate committees to: (1) review programs and tax expenditures in their jurisdictions to identify waste, fraud, and abuse or duplication, and to increase the use of performance data to inform committee work; (2) review the matters for congressional consideration identified on the Government Accountability Office (GAO) High Risk list report and the annual report to reduce program duplication; and (3) make recommendations to the Senate Budget Committee to improve governmental performance in their annual views and estimates reports. It called on the Congressional Budget Office (CBO), in its annual Update to the Budget and Economic Outlook, to: (1) report changes in direct spending and revenue associated with the Patient Protection and Affordable Care Act and the Health Care and Education Reconciliation Act of 2010, including the net impact on deficit, both with on-budget and off-budget effects; and (2) provide an analysis of the budgetary effects of 30%, 50%, and 100% of Americans losing employer sponsored health insurance and accessing coverage through federal or state exchanges. The resolution listed new budget authority, outlays, and administrative expenses for the Social Security Administration (SSA), including the Federal Old-Age and Survivors Insurance Trust Fund and the Federal Disability Insurance Trust Fund, U.S. Postal Service discretionary administrative expenses, and specified major functional categories for FY2013-FY2023. It also authorized a variety of deficit-neutral reserve funds, and a reserve fund for tax reform, as well as deficit-reduction reserve funds for government reform and efficiency, and to promote corporate tax fairness.

The Senate resolution was an "original bill" which means that it was a bill drafted by a committee (rather than by an individual member). In this case, it was drafted by the Senate Budget Committee. After passing a vote by the committee on March 15, 2013, Committee Chairwoman Patty Murray reported the Senate Bill to the Senate floor and it was placed on the Senate Legislative Calendar. On March 20, 2013, Senator Murray asked for unanimous consent that the Senate move on to the consideration of Calendar No. 28. Unanimous consent was ordered. Under the rules established, each side had 25 hours of time during the debate, and unlimited amendments could be offered. The Senate continued to debate and amend the Senate bill on March 21, 22, and 23. A total of 573 amendments were offered to the bill, although only 63 were actually adopted.

The resolution was debated on the Senate floor beginning on March 21, 2013. Two days later, on March 23, 2013 the Senate passed the resolution, 50-49, with 48 Democrats, 0 Republicans, and 2 Independents voting in favor of passage, 4 Democrats and 45 Republicans voting against, with one Democrat not voting. The four Senate Democrats who voted against their party's bill were Mark Begich (D-AK), Mark Pryor (D-AR), Max Baucus (D-MT), and Kay Hagan (D-NC). All four of these Senators are from states generally considered to vote Republican; all four are also up for re-election in 2014. Frank Lautenberg (D-NJ) did not vote.

The Senate passed the FY2014 budget resolution on March 23, 2013 – 23 days before the deadline set by the No Budget, No Pay Act of 2013. This was the first budget resolution passed by the Senate since a FY2010 budget passed on April 29, 2009.

=== Obama administration proposal ===
The Obama administration submitted its FY2014 budget proposal on April 10, 2013.

=== Lack of budget conference committee ===
On March 22, 2013, the Senate began debating its proposal for the Federal budget. The ranking member of the Senate Budget Committee, Senator Jeff Sessions (R-AL), expressed doubts on March 22, 2013 that the two chambers of Congress would be able to reconcile the two bills. Speaking on the Senate floor, Sessions argued that the Senate bill failed to balance the budget, raised taxes, and increased government spending.

This was the first time in four years that the Senate had approved its own budget resolution, allowing the possibility of 'regular order' procedures in which the Senate and House appoint representatives to a joint budget conference committee to negotiate a compromise. Democratic Party members of the House Appropriations Committee wrote a letter on 17 April 2013 urging Speaker Boehner to appoint House members to the budget conference committee. Slate political correspondent John Dickerson argued that Democrats were eager to begin conference discussions because they believed that Republicans would not be able to defend their 'no taxes' position when working with actual budget numbers. Under conference committee rules, the Senate Democrats would gain the power to force the committee to vote, which in Dickerson's view caused Republicans to worry about being embarrassed.

== Related fiscal legislation ==
=== Initial continuing resolution and government shutdown ===
Though there was no unified congressional budget, the House and Senate each moved forward with appropriations bills, but none passed. As the beginning of the 2014 fiscal year (October 1, 2013) approached, Congress debated the Continuing Appropriations Resolution, 2014 to fund the government temporarily. It did not pass before the beginning of the new fiscal year, leading to the 16-day-long 2013 government shutdown. Republicans proposed a number of bills to continue to fund parts of the government, including the Pay Our Military Act and a series of 14 mini-continuing resolutions; of these bills, only the Pay Our Military Act and one of the mini-continuing resolutions, the Department of Defense Survivor Benefits Continuing Resolution, 2014, passed. On October 17, with the passage of the Continuing Appropriations Act, 2014, the shutdown ended and the government reopened.

=== Bipartisan Budget Act of 2013 ===
On December 10, 2013, pursuant to the provisions of the Continuing Appropriations Act, 2014 calling for a joint budget conference to work on possible compromises, Representative Paul Ryan and Senator Patty Murray announced a compromise spending/budget proposal that they had agreed to. They chose to introduce the text as an amendment to H.J.Res. 59. The amendment was to completely replace the existing text of H.J.Res. 59 with the text of the Bipartisan Budget Act of 2013.

The deal caps the federal government's spending for Fiscal Year 2014 at $1.012 trillion and for Fiscal Year 2015 at $1.014.

This deal would eliminate some of the spending cuts required by the sequester by $45 billion of the cuts scheduled to happen in January 2014 and $18 billion of the cuts scheduled to happen in 2015. Federal spending would thus be larger in these two years, but would be less in subsequent years until 2023. The deal makes up for this increase in spending by imposing sequester cuts in 2022 and 2023, raising airline fees and changing the pension contribution requirements of new federal workers, among other measures. Paul Ryan said that the bill would lower the deficit by $23 billion overall. The eliminated sequester cuts were spread evenly between defense spending and non-defense discretionary spending. The bill did not make any changes to entitlement programs.

Some Republicans wanted Speaker Boehner to pursue a temporary measure that would cover the rest of Fiscal Year 2014 at the level set by the sequester — $967 billion, rather than pass this budget deal, which would have $45 billion in additional spending.

=== Final appropriations legislation passed ===
One last continuing resolution was passed lasting three days. The full-year omnibus spending bill, called the Consolidated Appropriations Act, 2014, was passed in January 2014.

== Total revenues and spending ==
=== Receipts ===
2014 Actual Receipts by Source
1. Individual income tax (46.2%)
2. Social Security/other payroll tax (33.9%)
3. Corporate income tax (10.6%)
4. Deposits of earnings and Federal Reserve System (3.30%)
5. Excise tax (3.10%)
6. Customs duties (1.10%)
7. Estate and gift taxes (0.60%)
8. Other miscellaneous receipts (1.20%)

(In billions of dollars):

Source	Requested	Enacted	Actual
Individual income tax	1,383	1,386	1,395
Corporate income tax	333	333	321
Social Security and other payroll tax	1,031	1,020	1,023
Excise tax	105	94	93
Customs duties	39	35	34
Estate and gift taxes	13	16	19
Deposits of earnings and Federal Reserve System	92	90	99
Other miscellaneous receipts	38	27	37
Total	3,034	3,002	3,021

=== Outlays by agency ===
In billions of dollars:

Agency	Discretionary, requested	Discretionary, enacted	Mandatory, requested	Mandatory, enacted
Department of Defense including Overseas Contingency Operations	526.6			
Department of Health and Human Services including Medicare and Medicaid	78.3			
Department of Education	71.2			
Department of Veterans Affairs	63.5			
Department of Housing and Urban Development	33.1			
Department of State and Other International Programs	48.1			
Department of Homeland Security	39.0			
Department of Energy	28.4			
Department of Justice	16.3			
Department of Agriculture	21.5			
National Aeronautics and Space Administration	17.7			
National Intelligence Program	48.2			
Department of Transportation	16.3			
Department of the Treasury	12.9			
Department of the Interior	11.7			
Department of Labor	12.1			
Social Security Administration	9.1			
Department of Commerce	8.6			
Army Corps of Engineers Civil Works	4.7			
Environmental Protection Agency	8.2			
National Science Foundation	7.6			
Small Business Administration	0.8			
Corporation for National and Community Service	1.1			
Net interest	0			
Disaster costs	6		0	
Other spending	19.4			
Total	1,235		2,475	

== See also ==
- United States budget process
- United States House Committee on the Budget
- United States Senate Committee on the Budget
- Bipartisan Budget Act of 2013
