= S. 1963 (113th Congress) =

- Long title: To repeal section 403 of the Bipartisan Budget Act of 2013.
- Announced in: the 113th United States Congress
- Sponsored by: Sen. Mark L. Pryor (D, AR)
- Number of co-sponsors: 3

Codification
- Acts affected: Bipartisan Budget Act of 2013

Legislative history
- Introduced in the Senate as S. 1963 by Sen. Mark L. Pryor (D, AR) on January 27, 2014

The bill To repeal section 403 of the Bipartisan Budget Act of 2013 (S. 1963) is a bill that would repeal the provision of the Bipartisan Budget Act of 2013 that makes changes to the cost of living allowance to military veterans.

The bill was introduced in the United States Senate during the 113th United States Congress.

== Provisions of the bill ==
According to the Congressional Research Service, this bill "repeals a provision of the Bipartisan Budget Act of 2013 that reduces the cost-of-living adjustment to the retirement pay of members of the Armed Forces under age 62." That provision was one of the budget saving measures which would have saved $6 billion. The cut, which would begin in December 2015, would be a one percent below inflation cut to the cost of living benefits to working-age veterans who are not disabled.

=== Proposed amendments ===
One proposed amendment, from Senator Kelly Ayotte (R-NH) would outlaw illegal immigrants claiming a child tax credit. On February 11, 2014, it was considered unlikely that this would pass, although Senate Majority Leader Harry Reid did say he would allow a vote on the amendment.

Other proposed amendments have focused on closing some offshore tax loopholes in order to pay for the bill.

== Congressional Budget Office report ==
This summary is based largely on the summary provided by the Congressional Budget Office, a public domain source.

Section 403 of the Bipartisan Budget Act of 2013 (Pub. L. 113–67 (text) (PDF)) reduced the annual cost-of-living adjustment for annuities paid to certain military retirees and survivors by up to 1 percent. The Congressional Budget Office (CBO) estimated that section 403 would reduce direct spending by $6,235 million over the 2014-2023 period. The Consolidated Appropriations Act, 2014 exempted disability retirees and certain survivors from this reduction of one percent, which reduced the savings associated with that provision to $5,662 million over that same period. S. 1963 would repeal section 403 of P.L. 113–67. Relative to CBO's February 2014 baseline, we estimate that enacting S. 1963 would increase direct spending by $6,813 million; $5,662 million through 2023, plus $1,151 million in 2024.

For this proposal, the increase in spending subject to appropriation represents an increase in discretionary accrual payments to the Military Retirement Trust Fund. While those payments count against discretionary budget caps, they are intragovernmental transactions, and the exact amounts would be determined by the Department of Defense Office of the Actuary.

Pursuant to section 604 of H. Con. Res. 25, the Concurrent Resolution on the Budget for Fiscal Year 2014, and section 311 of S. Con. Res. 70, the Concurrent Resolution on the Budget for Fiscal Year 2009, CBO estimates that S. 1963 would increase direct spending by more than $5 billion in at least one of the four consecutive 10-year periods beginning in 2024.

== Procedural history ==
S. 1963 was introduced into the United States Senate on January 27, 2014, by Sen. Mark L. Pryor (D, AR). On February 10, 2014, the Senate voted 94–0 to end the debate on whether or not to consider the bill, meaning that they would move forward and begin considering the bill during the rest of that week.

== Debate and discussion ==
On February 10, 2014, Republicans indicated that they would not support the bill as it was written that day and insisted that the bill needed to contain an offset to counteract the additional $6 billion that would be spent if the bill was passed.

Senator Pryor, who introduced the bill argued that "there is no question that we need to cut our spending, but we must do it responsibly... We cannot balance the budget on the backs of our service members."

== See also ==
- List of bills in the 113th United States Congress
- Bipartisan Budget Act of 2013
