= Consolidated Appropriations Act, 2014 =

United States bill

Space Launch Liability Indemnification Extension Act / Consolidated Appropriations Act, 2014
- Nicknames: Omnibus Spending Bill
- Announced in: the 113th United States Congress
- Sponsored by: Rep. Lamar Smith (R, TX-21)

Legislative history
- Introduced in the House as H.R. 3547 by Rep. Lamar Smith (R, TX-21) on November 20, 2013; Committee consideration by United States House Committee on Science, Space and Technology; Passed the House on December 2, 2013 (Roll Call Vote 612: 376-5); Passed the Senate as the A bill to extend Government liability, subject to appropriation, for certain third-party claims arising from commercial space launches. on December 12, 2013 (unanimous consent)

The Consolidated Appropriations Act, 2014 (H.R. 3547, nicknamed the Cromnibus) is an omnibus spending bill that packages several appropriation bills together in one larger bill. The 113th United States Congress failed to pass any of the twelve regular appropriations bills before the beginning of Fiscal Year 2014. The Continuing Appropriations Act, 2014 temporarily funded the government from October 1, 2013 to January 15, 2014. A second continuing resolution extended funding until January 18, 2014, giving both the House and the Senate enough time to vote on this bill.

== Background ==
The budget and spending process of the United States federal government is a complex one. The United States budget process traditionally begins when the President of the United States submits a budget request to Congress. The Budget and Accounting Act of 1921 requires the President to submit the budget to Congress for each fiscal year, which is the 12-month period beginning on October 1 and ending on September 30 of the next calendar year. The current federal budget law (31 U.S.C. § 1105(a)) requires that the President submit their budget request between the first Monday in January and the first Monday in February. However, it is Congress that actually establishes the budget, as the U.S. Constitution (Article I, section 9, clause 7) states that "No money shall be drawn from the Treasury, but in Consequence of Appropriations made by Law; and a regular Statement and Account of Receipts and Expenditures of all public Money shall be published from time to time." The President does not sign the final budget.

In 2013, the House of Representatives passed its budget proposal, H.Con.Res. 25, prior to the submission of the President's budget proposal, as did the Senate S.Con.Res. 8. The House and Senate budget resolutions were not expected to be reconciled as a final budget. President Obama submitted his Fiscal Year 2014 budget proposal on April 10, 2013, two months past the February 4 deadline. The three budgets contained significant differences and were never reconciled.

Several attempts were made to carry on with the regular appropriations process. The House passed the Military Construction and Veterans Affairs, and Related Agencies Appropriations Act, 2014 (H.R. 2216, June 4, 2013), the Department of Homeland Security Appropriations Act, 2014 (H.R. 2217, June 6, 2013), the Energy and Water Development and Related Agencies Appropriations Act, 2014 (H.R. 2609, July 10, 2013), the Department of State Operations and Embassy Security Authorization Act, Fiscal Year 2014 (H.R. 2848, September 29, 2013), and the Department of Defense Appropriations Act, 2014 (H.R. 2397, July 24, 2103). None of these bills were voted on by the Senate. All twelve regular appropriations bills were introduced in the House and the Senate, but these five were the only ones to receive a vote by either body. Congress makes appropriations on a yearly basis. If no appropriations had been made by October 1, 2013, when Fiscal Year 2014 began, the federal government would have to shut down due to lack of funding.

With the October 1, 2013 deadline nearing, Congress turned its attention to passing a continuing resolution, which would allow the government to be funded at its existing levels for a set period of time, a move intended to give Congress more time to work out final appropriations without shutting down the government. The bill Continuing Appropriations Resolution, 2014 (H.J.Res 59) (H.J.Res. 59) was introduced on September 10, 2013. The bill would have extended government funding until December 15, 2013. Congress was unable to agree on a final version of the bill due to a controversy over defunding the Affordable Care Act, commonly known as "Obamacare". The result was the United States federal government shutdown of 2013. During the shutdown, House Republicans pursued a strategy of passing "mini" continuing resolutions. These bills would fund small, high-profile portions of the government. None of the bills were taken up by the Senate.

After 16 days of a federal government shutdown, Congress was able to agree to a new continuing resolution, and the Continuing Appropriations Act, 2014 (Pub. L. 113–46 (text) (PDF);H.R. 2775) was passed, ending the shutdown. The bill funded the government until January 15, 2014, and suspended the U.S. debt ceiling until February 7, 2014. After several more months of debate, Representative Paul Ryan and Senator Patty Murray announced a compromise budget on December 10, 2013. That budget was called the Bipartisan Budget Act of 2013 (H.J.Res. 59).

As the January 15, 2014 deadline to provide additional appropriations approached, the House and Senate agreed to pass another continuing resolution, this one until January 18, 2014, to provide more time to work on this omnibus appropriations bill.

== Provisions of the bill ==
=== Open access ===
Section 527 of the bill is a provision for providing open access to research publications produced as a result of all taxpayer-funded research. Previously the NIH Public Access Policy had issued an open access mandate of this sort, requiring that NIH funded research be published in such a way that anyone could review publications presenting it through PubMed. The Electronic Frontier Foundation commented saying, "this is big".

== Congressional Budget Office report ==
This summary is based on the summary provided by the Congressional Budget Office, a public domain source.

CBO Estimate of Discretionary Appropriations for Fiscal year 2014, Including H.R. 3547, the Consolidated Appropriations Act, 2014, as posted on the websited of the House Committee on Rules on January 13, 2014

CBO Estimate of Discretionary Appropriations for Fiscal year 2014, Including H.R. 3547, the Consolidated Appropriations Act, 2014, as posted on the website of the House Committee on Rules on January 13, 2014.

Subcommittee	Total Appropriations - Budget Authority
Agriculture, Rural Development, Food and Drug Administration, and Related Agencies	20,880,000
Commerce, Justice, Science, and Related Agencies	51,600,000
Defense	572,042,000
Energy and Water Development	34,060,000
Financial Services and General Government	21,851,000
Homeland Security	45,123,000
Interior, Environment, and Related Agencies	30,058,000
Labor, Health and Human Services, Education, and Related Agencies	157,697,000
Legislative Branch	4,258,000
Military Construction, Veterans Affairs, and Related Agencies	73,299,000
State, Foreign Operations, and Related Programs	49,001,000
Transportation, Housing and Urban Development, and Related Agencies	50,856,000
Total	1,110,725,000

== Procedural history ==
The Consolidated Appropriations Act, 2014 (H.R. 3547) began its life as the "Space Launch Liability Indemnification Extension Act" (also H.R. 3547). The Space Launch Liability Indemnification Extension Act was introduced into the United States House of Representatives on November 20, 2013 by Rep. Lamar Smith (R, TX-21). It was referred to the United States House Committee on Science, Space and Technology. On December 2, 2013, the House voted in Roll Call Vote 612 to pass the bill 376-5. The Senate voted on December 12, 2013 to pass the bill amended by unanimous consent. This sent the bill back to the House for reconsideration of the amended version.

One month later, the House and Senate leadership decided to use H.R. 3547 as a vehicle for passing the Consolidated Appropriations Act, 2014. The House leadership intended to vote on an amendment to the bill on January 15, 2014 so that the Senate would have a chance to work on it before the deadline. That amendment turned out to be 1,500 pages long and included all of the consolidated appropriations needed to fund the federal government until October 1, 2014. The original material for the Space Launch Liability Indeminification Extension Act became one paragraph in Section 8.

== See also ==
- List of bills in the 113th United States Congress
- United States budget process
