= Energy and Water Development and Related Agencies Appropriations Act, 2014 =

The Energy and Water Development and Related Agencies Appropriations Act, 2014 refers to appropriations bills introduced during the 113th United States Congress. There are two different versions: H.R. 2609 in the House of Representatives and S. 1245 in the Senate. The bill was later incorporated as Division D of the Consolidated Appropriations Act, 2014, which was enacted on January 2014.

The money would be appropriated to the U.S. Army Corps of Engineers, Bureau of Reclamation and other U.S. Department of the Interior projects, and Department of Energy projects. Many of these projects relate to electricity generation, transmission, and sale; nuclear power cleanup projects; hydropower; flood control; and so forth. This funding used during fiscal year 2014, which started on October 1, 2013 and ended on. September 30, 2014.

The House version totals $30.4 billion in spending. The Senate version, as approved by the full Senate Appropriations Committee on June 27, appropriates $34.8 billion. The Senate bill was $1.96 billion below, and the House bill was $2.9 billion lower, the enacted funding level for the previous fiscal year (FY 2013) before sequestration. The Senate bill is $4.4 billion more than the House version of the bill, and funds Obama administration priorities for DOE Office of Science and clean energy basic research, which were significantly reduced in the House version of the bill. Both bills are below the budget request of President Barack Obama. The decreases in funding were "made possible by agency consolidations and rolling back of government regulations."

== Background ==
Congress annually considers several appropriations measures, which provide funding for numerous activities, for example, national defense, education, and homeland security, as well as general government operations. There are three types of appropriations measures. Regular appropriations bills provide most of the funding that is provided in all appropriations measures for a fiscal year, and must be enacted by October 1, the beginning of the fiscal year. If regular bills are not enacted by the beginning of the new fiscal year, Congress adopts continuing resolutions to continue funding, generally until regular bills are enacted. Supplemental appropriations bills provide additional appropriations to become available during a fiscal year. Reasons that supplemental appropriations bills might be necessary including funding for a war or to help recover from a natural disaster (such as the Disaster Relief Appropriations Act, 2013). The Energy and Water Development and Related Agencies Appropriations Act, 2014 (H.R. 2609; 113th Congress) is one of several regular appropriation bills that were passed by the House of Representatives in order to provide funding for Fiscal Year 2014.

Congress has also established an authorization-appropriation process that provides for two separate types of measures—authorization bills and appropriation bills. These measures perform different functions. Authorization bills establish, continue, or modify agencies or programs. Appropriations measures subsequently provide funding for the agencies and programs authorized.

== House bill ==
Energy and Water Development and Related Agencies Appropriations Act, 2014
- Long title: Making appropriations for energy and water development and related agencies for the fiscal year ending September 30, 2014, and for other purposes.
- Announced in: the 113th United States Congress
- Sponsored by: Rep. Rodney Frelinghuysen (R-NJ)
- Number of co-sponsors: 0

Codification
- Acts affected: Department of Energy Organization Act, Flood Control Act of 1944, Delta Regional Authority Act of 2000, Water Resources Development Act of 1986, and others
- U.S.C. sections affected: 33 U.S.C. § 1251 et seq., 16 U.S.C. § 6806, 43 U.S.C. § 395, 42 U.S.C. § 7101 et seq., and others
- Agencies affected: United States Congress, Government Accountability Office, Executive Office of the President, United States Department of the Interior, United States Bureau of Reclamation, U.S. Fish and Wildlife Service, International Boundary and Water Commission, United States Department of the Army, Nuclear Regulatory Commission, United States Environmental Protection Agency, United States Department of Energy, Energy Information Administration, Federal Energy Regulatory Commission, National Nuclear Security Administration, United States Army Corps of Engineers, United States Department of Defense
- Appropriations: $32,629,709,671

Legislative history
- Introduced in the House as H.R. 2609 by Rep. Rodney Frelinghuysen (R-NJ) on July 2, 2013; Committee consideration by United States Senate Committee on Appropriations; Passed the House on July 10, 2013 (Roll Call Vote 345: 227-198)

"Comparative Statement of New Budget (Obligational) Authority for 2013 and Budget Requests and Amounts Recommended in the House Bill for 2014" - table from page 4 of House Report 113-135.
	FY 2013 Enacted	FY 2014 Request	Bill	Bill vs. Enacted	Bill vs. Request
Title I. Department of Defense – Civil	10,330,000,000	4,826,000,000	4,876,000,000	-5,454,000,000	+50,000,000
Title II. Department of the Interior	1,068,719,000	1,049,584,000	964,757,000	-103,962,000	-84,827,000
Title III. Department of Energy	27,043,427,000	28,953,893,000	24,925,252,000	-2,118,175,000	-4,028,641,000
Title IV. Independent Agencies	254,496,000	243,330,000	249,279,000	-5,217,000	+5,949,000
Title V. General Provisions	---	-100,000,000	-519,000,000	-519,000,000	-419,000,000
Subtotal	38,696,642,000	34,972,807,000	30,496,288,000	-8,200,354,000	-4,476,519,000
Scorekeeping adjustments	-1,952,642,000	-489,288,000	-70,288,000	+1,882,354,00	+419,000,000
Grand total for the bill	36,744,000,000	34,483,519,000	30,426,000,000	-6,318,000,000	-4,057,519,000

=== Appropriations ===
The Energy and Water Development and Related Agencies Appropriations Act, 2014 would make appropriations for energy and water development and related agencies for FY2014.

The bill would appropriate funds to the United States Army Corps of Engineers, for: (1) civil functions pertaining to river and harbor, flood and storm damage reduction, shore protection, and aquatic ecosystem restoration (including the Mississippi River alluvial valley below Cape Girardeau, Missouri); (2) the regulatory program pertaining to navigable waters and wetlands; (3) the formerly utilized sites remedial action program for clean-up of early atomic energy program contamination; (4) flood control and coastal emergencies, including hurricanes and other natural disasters; and (5) the Office of Assistant Secretary of the Army (Civil Works). If passed, the Army Corps of Engineers would receive funding of $4.9 billion, which is $104 million less than the previous year, but $50 million more than President Obama requested in his budget. The bill includes a provision that would prohibit the "Army Corps from revising regulations on the discharge of fill material." An amendment offered by Rep. Stephen Lynch was adopted that would increase funding for Civil Works construction by $20 million and cut Fossil Energy Research and Development by an equal amount.

The bill would make appropriations for FY2014 to the United States Department of the Interior for: (1) the Central Utah Project Completion Account; (2) the United States Bureau of Reclamation, including for water and related natural resources; (3) the Central Valley Project Restoration Fund; (4) California Bay-Delta Restoration; (5) administrative expenses in the Office of the Commissioner (the Denver office); and (6) offices in the five regions of the Bureau of Reclamation. The Bureau of Reclamation would receive $965 million, a decrease of $104 million from their Fiscal Year 2013 funding.

The bill would also make appropriations for FY2014 to the United States Department of Energy (DOE) for energy and science programs, including: (1) energy efficiency and renewable energy, (2) electricity delivery and energy reliability, (3) nuclear energy, (4) fossil energy research and development, (5) naval petroleum and oil shale reserves, (6) the Strategic Petroleum Reserve (SPR) and the Northeast Home Heating Oil Reserve, (7) the Energy Information Administration, (8) non-defense environmental cleanup, (9) the Uranium Enrichment Decontamination and Decommissioning Fund, (10) science activities, (11) the Advanced Research Projects Agency-Energy (ARPA-E), (12) the Title 17 Innovative Technology Loan Guarantee Loan Program, (13) the Advanced Technology Vehicles Manufacturing Loan Program, (14) departmental administration, (15) the Office of the Inspector General, (16) the National Nuclear Security Administration and atomic energy defense weapons activities, (17) defense nuclear nonproliferation activities, (18) naval reactors activities, (19) Office of the Administrator in the National Nuclear Security Administration, (20) defense environmental cleanup, and (21) other defense activities.

Overall, the Department of Energy would receive $24.9 billion in funding. A $1 billion cut would result from the combination of several offices – electrical delivery, energy reliability, energy efficiency and renewables – into one office that would receive $982.6 million in funding.

The bill would approve expenditures from the Bonneville Power Administration Fund for specified construction activities.

The bill would also make FY2014 appropriations for operation and maintenance of: (1) the Southeastern Power Administration, (2) the Southwestern Power Administration, (3) the Western Area Power Administration, including construction and rehabilitation, (4) the Falcon and Amistad Operating and Maintenance Fund, (5) the Federal Energy Regulatory Commission (FERC), and (6) specified DOE activities.

The bill would make FY2014 appropriations to: (1) the Appalachian Regional Commission; (2) the Defense Nuclear Facilities Safety Board; (3) the Delta Regional Authority; (4) the Denali Commission; (5) the Northern Border Regional Commission; (6) the Southeast Crescent Regional Commission; (7) the Nuclear Regulatory Commission (NRC), including the Office of Inspector General; (8) the Nuclear Waste Technical Review Board; and (9) the Office of the Federal Coordinator, Alaska Natural Gas Transportation Projects.

=== Policies and restrictions ===
The bill would prohibit the use of funds: (1) to conduct closure of adjudicatory functions, technical review, or support activities associated with the Yucca Mountain (Nevada) geologic repository license application; or (2) for actions that irrevocably remove the possibility that Yucca Mountain may be a repository option in the future.

The bill would change the federal definition of water, defined in the Clean Water Act.

Representative Mike Burgess offered an amendment that was adopted that would prohibit the "implementation and enforcement of federal regulations related to refrigerators, freezers and incandescent light bulbs." Representative Marsha Blackburn offered an amendment that was adopted which would prevent the Department of Energy from regulating ceiling fans. Representative Tim Walberg offered an amendment that was adopted that would end a national media campaign that promotes alternative energy to the public.

=== Procedural history of the House bill ===
The Energy and Water Development and Related Agencies Appropriations Act, 2014 was introduced into the United States House of Representatives on July 2, 2013 by Rep. Rodney Frelinghuysen (R-NJ). It was reported by the United States House Committee on Appropriations and placed on the Union Calendar, Calendar No. 97. On July 5, 2013, the House Majority Leader Eric Cantor announced that the House would take up H.R. 2609 during the week of July 8, 2013. H.R. 2609 was accompanied by House Report 113-135. This 229-page report includes an introduction, tables comparing spending and requested funds in FY 2013 and 2014, and additional views by members of the committee. The House voted on July 10, 2013 in Roll Call Vote 345 to pass the bill 227-198. Eight Democrats voted in favor of the bill and nine Republicans voted against it.

H.R. 2609 was received in the Senate on July 16, 2013. At the time they received the bill, the Senate was considered unlikely to pass it. President Obama threatened to veto the House bill.

== Senate bill ==
The Senate introduced, but did not pass, their own alternative version of the bill S. 1245, also called the "Energy and Water Development and Related Agencies Appropriations Act, 2014." The Senate bill provided $4.4 billion more funding than the House version.

== Continuing resolution for FY 2013 funding levels ==
The United States Senate did not pass any of the regular appropriation bills passed by the House of Representatives during the spring and summer of 2013. In September 2013, as the deadline was approaching for appropriating funds for Fiscal Year 2014 and it became clear that the Senate would not pass any of the regular appropriation bills, the House passed the Continuing Appropriations Resolution, 2014 (H.J.Res 59), which would appropriate money to operate the federal government until December 15, 2013. The Senate rejected this measure as well, leading to the United States federal government shutdown of 2013.

== Debate ==
The National Electrical Contractors Association (NECA) was one of the lobbyist groups involved in the creation of the bill. On their website, NECA announced that they had lobbied moderate Republicans to prevent Rep. Steve King (R-IA) from offering an amendment to the bill that would "prohibit the application of Davis-Bacon on construction projects funded in the bill." The Davis–Bacon Act of 1931 is a United States federal law that establishes the requirement for paying the local prevailing wages on public works projects for laborers and mechanics. It applies to “contractors and subcontractors performing on federally funded or assisted contracts in excess of $2,000 for the construction, alteration, or repair (including painting and decorating) of public buildings or public works”. The NECA considered the prevention of this amendment being offered a victory.

The House bill was said to prioritize "funding towards energy programs that encourage economic competitiveness and growth," and programs that would "help advance the nation's goal of energy independence." Republican Representative Rodney Frelinghuysen said that, "the reductions we had to make to the applied energy research and energy development programs will shift more of their work to the private sector." Arguing in favor of his amendment to end spending on advertisements for renewal energy, Rep. Walberg said, "the American people don't need more government bureaucracy telling them what energy sources they should use," and that "the government needs to get out of the business of picking winners and losers in the energy market, and certainly shouldn't be funding advertising campaigns on behalf of private green-energy firms."

Democrats in the House offered amendments to increase funding for renewable energy and energy efficiency programs, amendments which failed to pass and were not adopted. The highest ranking Democrats on the Appropriations Energy and Water Development Subcommittee argued against the cuts in renewal energy, say that "the bill abandons America's quest for energy independence, which has the potential to create millions of new jobs.”

== See also ==
- List of bills in the 113th United States Congress
- United States Army Corps of Engineers
- United States federal government shutdown of 2013
