= Space Launch Liability Indemnification Extension Act =

- Long title: To extend the application of certain space launch liability provisions through 2014.
- Announced in: the 113th United States Congress
- Sponsored by: Rep. Lamar Smith (R, TX-21)
- Number of co-sponsors: 3

Codification
- U.S.C. sections affected: 51 U.S.C. § 50915

Legislative history
- Introduced in the House as H.R. 3547 by Rep. Lamar Smith (R, TX-21) on November 20, 2013; Committee consideration by United States House Committee on Science, Space and Technology; Passed the House on December 2, 2013 (Roll Call Vote 612: 376-5)

The Space Launch Liability Indemnification Extension Act (H.R. 3547) is a bill that would extend until December 31, 2014 the current limitation on liability of commercial space launch companies. Under the current system, the space launch company is liable for any damages up to $500 million, after which the U.S. Government will pay the damages in the range of $500 million to $2.7 billion. Above $2.7 billion, the company is again responsible. The Space Launch Liability Indemnification Extension Act was passed by the United States House of Representatives during the 113th United States Congress.

== Background ==
Senator Bill Nelson has a similar bill in the United States Senate that would extend the system for three years instead of one. The system was created in 1988 when Congress passed the Commercial Space Launch Act Amendments.

== Provisions of the bill ==
This summary is based largely on the summary provided by the Congressional Research Service, a public domain source.

The Space Launch Liability Indemnification Extension Act would extend through December 31, 2014, the application deadline for licenses with respect to which the Secretary of Transportation (DOT) is required to pay third-party claims in excess of a commercial space launcher's required insurance coverage.

== Procedural history ==
The Space Launch Liability Indemnification Extension Act was introduced into the United States House of Representatives on November 20, 2013 by Rep. Lamar Smith (R, TX-21). It was referred to the United States House Committee on Science, Space and Technology. On November 27, 2013, House Majority Leader Eric Cantor announced the H.R. 3547 would be considered on the House floor on December 2, 2013. On December 2, 2013, the House voted in Roll Call Vote 612 to pass the bill 376-5. The Senate voted on December 12, 2013 to pass the bill amended by unanimous consent. This sent the bill back to the House for reconsideration of the amendment version.

One month later, the House and Senate leadership have decided to use H.R. 3547 as a vehicle for passing the Consolidated Appropriations Act, 2014. The House leadership intends to vote on amendment to the bill on January 15, 2014 so that the Senate has a chance to work on it before the deadline. That amendment would be 1,500 pages long and include all of the consolidated appropriations needed to fund the federal government until October 1, 2014. The originally material for the Space Launch Liability Indeminification Extension Act became one paragraph in Section 8.

== Debate and discussion ==
Speaking in favor of the bill, Rep. Smith said that "this important protection is similar to what other nations provide and enables our space industry to remain competitive." Smith also noted that "the provision has never been triggered by a serious accident."

== See also ==
- List of bills in the 113th United States Congress
- Private spaceflight
- Commercialization of space
- Space tourism
