= Bipartisan Budget Act of 2013 =

United States Law

- Long title: Making continuing appropriations for fiscal year 2014, and for other purposes.
- Nicknames: Budget bill
- Enacted by: the 113th United States Congress

Citations
- Public law: Pub. L. 113–67 (text) (PDF)

Codification
- Acts amended: Balanced Budget and Emergency Deficit Control Act of 1985, and others

Legislative history
- Introduced in the House as H.J.Res. 59 by Hal Rogers (R–KY) on September 10, 2013; Committee consideration by United States House Committee on Appropriations, United States House Committee on the Budget; Passed the House on December 12, 2013 (Roll Call Vote 640: 332-94); Passed the Senate on December 18, 2013 (Roll Call Vote 281: 64-36); Signed into law by President Barack Obama on December 26, 2013

The Bipartisan Budget Act of 2013 (H.J.Res. 59; Pub. L. 113–67 (text) (PDF)) is a federal statute concerning spending and the budget in the United States, that was signed into law by President Barack Obama on December 26, 2013. On December 10, 2013, pursuant to the provisions of the Continuing Appropriations Act, 2014 calling for a joint budget conference to work on possible compromises, Representative Paul Ryan and Senator Patty Murray announced a compromise that they had agreed to after extended discussions between them. The law raises the sequestration caps for fiscal years 2014 and 2015, in return for extending the imposition of the caps into 2022 and 2023, and miscellaneous savings elsewhere in the budget. Overall, the bill is projected to lower the deficit by $23 billion over the long term.

In forming the deal behind the bill that was passed, Ryan and Murray explicitly avoided trying to find a "grand bargain", in which Democrats would buy into reduced entitlements spending while Republicans would agree to higher tax rates, as several past negotiations along such lines had failed. Instead, in Ryan's words, negotiations sought to "focus on common ground ... to get some minimal accomplishments". The deal did represent a rare example of bipartisanship during this period and promised to end for a while the last-minute, crisis-driven budget battles that had consumed Congress for much of the prior three years.

== Provisions ==
The bill caps the federal government's overall discretionary spending for Fiscal Year 2014 at $1.012 trillion and for Fiscal Year 2015 at $1.014.

This deal would eliminate some of the spending cuts required by the sequester by $45 billion of the cuts scheduled to happen in January 2014 and $18 billion of the cuts scheduled to happen in 2015. Federal spending would thus be larger in these two years, but would be less in subsequent years until 2023, due to other provisions such as imposing sequester cuts in 2022 and 2023, raising airline fees and changing the pension contribution requirements of new federal workers. Paul Ryan said that the bill would lower the deficit by $23 billion overall. The increased spending for 2014 and 2015 was spread evenly between defense spending and non-defense discretionary spending, leaving the cuts to mandatory spending unchanged. The bill did not make any changes to entitlement programs.

The spending reduction provisions contained in the bill include:

- Federal fees associated with airline security were increased from $2.50 to $5.60 for a one-way, non-stop flight. It would also increase the current maximum $5 fee for a one-way, connecting flights to $5.60. The Transportation Security Administration would take in $12.6 billion over ten years as a result of this change. The industry association Airlines 4 America lobbied against the change because it could deter travel as a result of increased ticket prices. Airlines received two concessions in exchange for ending their lobbying against the increase: TSA agents to continue monitoring the exits of "sterile areas" that had passengers who had already been screened by security and the elimination of an Aviation Security Infrastructure Fee charged to airlines. Representative Mick Mulvaney indicated that members were told airlines had quit lobbying because "the airlines got something out of it. That's how it works in this town. If you have a lobbyist you get something." The bill states that any money raised by this tax will be placed in the government's general fund.
- The deal would require newly hired federal employees to pay a larger share into their pension fund than they would have had to pay prior to this deal.
- American troops who have retired and are under the age of 62 would have cost-of-living adjustments (COLA) cut by 1% each year under the new deal. By the 2014 calculation of 1.5% the retired will receive 0.5% increase. Their COLA will still go up, however.
- The maximum salary of a federal contractor would be capped at $487,000.
- The Department of Commerce keeps a file called the "Death Master File" of everyone who has died and what their social security number was. This budget deal would try to prevent fraud by restricting access to this list and increasing the punishments for misuse.
- Reporting requirements and coordination were improved to ensure prisoners did not receive government benefits such as unemployment checks.
- The bill would end automatic payments to non-profit student loan servicers and change their payments to a yearly authorization. Paul Ryan's office says that this change will save the government $3 billion.
- The sequestration caps, which would have expired after 2021, were extended to apply to 2022 and 2023.

The bill only specifies overall spending levels; Congress had only four weeks after the deal to produce a full set of appropriations bills containing the detailed breakdown of how the money should be spent. This was in contrast to the previous fiscal year in which a full-year continuing resolution preserved FY 2012 spending levels without the chance to make reductions in specific programs, which triggered the across-the-board sequestration cuts. As Senator Barbara Mikulski said following its passage, "We finally get a chance to be appropriators."

== Legislative history ==
=== Continuing Appropriations Resolution, 2014 ===
The original text of the bill was the Continuing Appropriations Resolution, 2014, a continuing resolution that would appropriate funds for the 2014 fiscal year. Though versions of the bill passed each house of Congress, the House and Senate were not able to reconcile the bills and pass a compromise measure. The original continuing resolution passed the House on September 20, 2013. When it first passed the House, the bill included provisions that would defund the Affordable Care Act. The Senate refused to adopt the resolution because of those provisions, and amended the bill to remove them before passing it. The House replaced the provisions that would defund the Affordable Care Act. The Senate refused to take up the measure and no continuing resolution of any kind was passed. This resulted in the government shutdown that began on October 1, 2013. A different bill, the Continuing Appropriations Act, 2014, was signed into law on October 17, 2013, and ended the shutdown.

=== Bipartisan Budget Act of 2013 ===
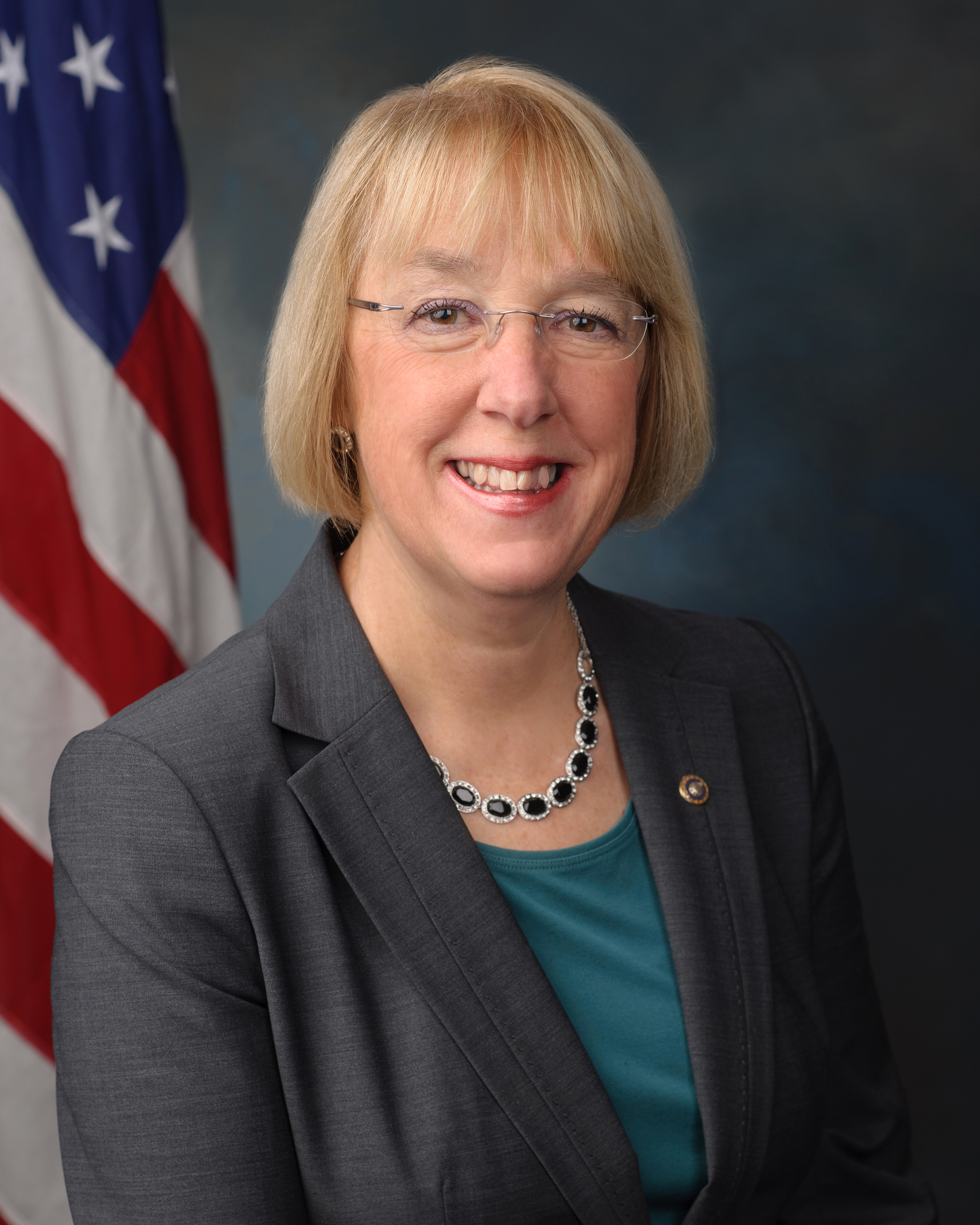
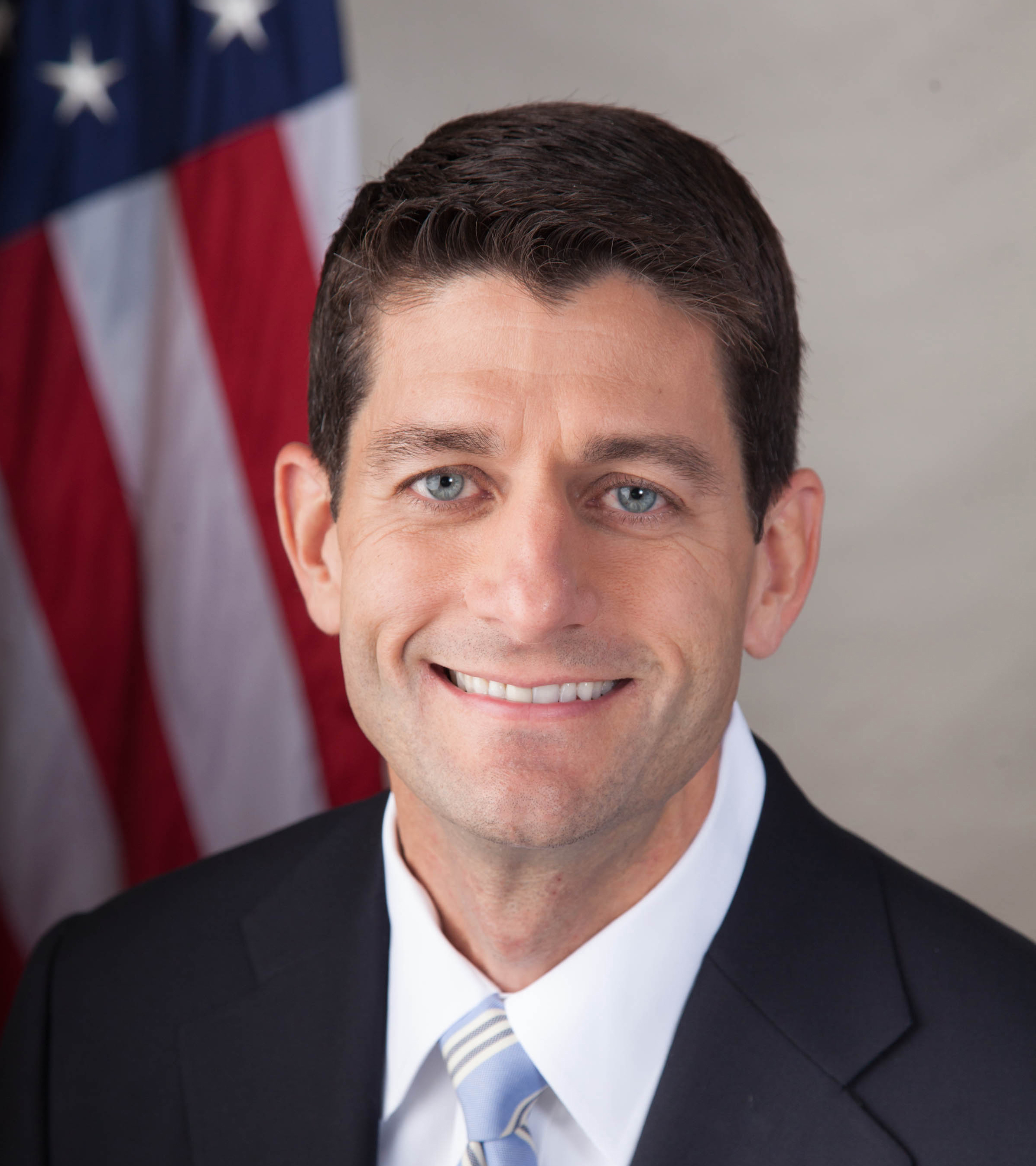
Senator Patty Murray (D-WA) and Representative Paul Ryan (R-WI) negotiated the proposed fiscal year 2014 budget deal.

Two months later, the bill became the vehicle for the compromise budget proposal of Representative Paul Ryan and Senator Patty Murray, known as the Bipartisan Budget Act of 2013. The bill was amended to completely replace the existing text of H.J.Res. 59 with the text of the "Bipartisan Budget Act of 2013".

The deal was proposed by negotiators Senator Patty Murray and Representative Paul Ryan on December 10, 2013.

The House Committee on the Rules met at 2pm on December 11, 2013 to decide on a rule to govern the debate on H.J.Res. 59, which would be amended to contain the text of the Bipartisan Budget Act of 2013. The rule enabled the House to consider H.J.Res. 59 as it had last been sent to them by the Senate, on October 1, 2013, prior to the 2013 federal government shutdown. The rule also made two amendments in order. The first amendment is the text of the Bipartisan Budget Act of 2013, which would completely replace the existing text of H.J.Res. 59. The second amendment is the addition of the Pathway for SGR Reform Act of 2013 to the bill to maintain medicare reimbursements to physicians. The House Committee on the Rules passed the rules by a vote of 9-3 on December 11, 2013. The Republican-controlled committee refused to allow Democrats to offer an extension of unemployment benefit for long term unemployed people.

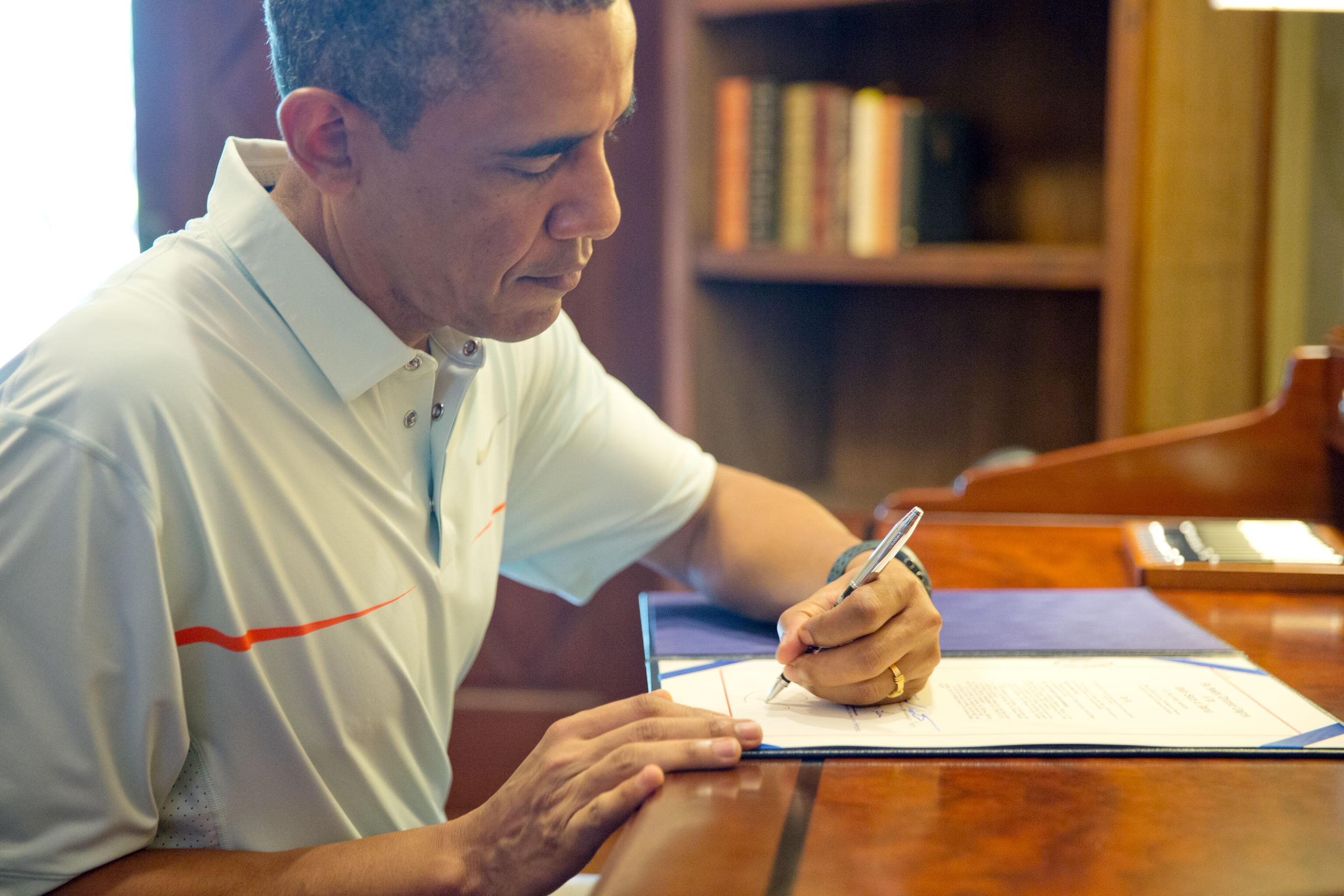
President Barack Obama signing the bill in Kailua, Honolulu County, Hawaii, while on family vacation.

The House approved the budget act 332-94 on December 12, with 163 Democrats joining 169 Republican to vote in favor, while 62 Republicans and 32 Democrats voted against the bill.

The Senate support for the bill was more partisan than in the House, with most Republicans opposed to it. However, cloture on the bill was gained on December 17 by a 67–33 vote, with 12 Republicans voting to let the bill go forward. Final Senate passage came on December 18 by a 64–36 margin, with 9 Republicans supporting it along with all 55 Democrats and aligned independents.

President Obama signed the bill into law on December 26, 2013.

== Debate ==
=== Reactions from Republican politicians ===
Some Republicans opposed the deal because they wanted the budget to focus on reducing government spending, not increasing government revenue through increased fees. Some Republicans opposed the increased airline ticket fees as a tax increase.

Republican Representative Mick Mulvaney opposed the agreement but did not blame Ryan for it, instead saying that the problem was too few conservatives had been elected to Congress to pass a budget with a greater focus on debt reduction. Mulvaney said that he expected the budget deal to pass because "it was designed to get the support of defense hawks and appropriators and Democrats," not conservatives. Republican Raul Labrador criticized the "terrible plan", saying that "it makes promises to the American people that are false. Today the Democrats realized they were right all along, that we would never hold the line on the sequester." Some Republicans wanted Speaker Boehner to pursue a temporary measure that would cover the rest of Fiscal Year 2014 at the level set by the sequester, $967 billion, rather than pass this budget deal, which would have $45 billion in additional spending.

Republicans who planned to vote in favor of the bill or were leaning towards doing so cited the bill as being practical for the divided Congress. Representative Steve Womack said that "it achieves most of the things we would like to see when we have divided government."

==== 2016 proposed Republican presidential candidates ====
The media reported on the opinions of the budget deal of proposed or likely Republican candidates for President in 2016. Paul Ryan was the Vice-Presidential candidate in 2012 and co-authored the proposed budget deal. He said that he was "proud" of the agreement because "it reduces the deficit - without raising taxes." Senators Rand Paul and Marco Rubio, considered likely Republicans candidates for President in 2016, were both against the deal. Rubio said that the proposal "continues Washington's irresponsible budgeting decisions" because it "cancels earlier spending reductions, instead of making some tough decisions about how to tackle our long-term fiscal challenges caused by runaway Washington spending."

=== Reactions from Democratic politicians ===
Some people believed House Democrats would pass the deal as a way to reduce the sequester cuts. However, the ranking Democrat on the House Budget Committee Chris Van Hollen (D-MD) told a morning news show on December 12, 2013, that "members of his party are outraged that House Republicans are planning to adjourn without addressing unemployment benefits."

President Barack Obama announced his support for the deal on December 10, 2013, calling the deal "balanced".

=== Reactions from commentators and policy groups ===
Ezra Klein said in a column that "the deal denies both Republicans and Democrats what they want most. Republicans didn't get any changes to Medicare and Social Security – much less any structural ones. Democrats didn't get any new taxes." According to Klein, "the deal is possible only because there are many Republicans who really hate the defense cuts."

Advocacy groups Heritage Action, the Club for Growth, and FreedomWorks all opposed the budget deal. Speaker Boehner criticized those groups for their opposition to the compromise.

== Amendments ==
=== Proposed ===
Senator Mark Pryor introduced the bill "To repeal section 403 of the Bipartisan Budget Act of 2013 (S. 1963; 113th Congress)" on January 27, 2014. The bill would repeal the provision of the Bipartisan Budget Act of 2013 that makes changes to the cost of living allowance to military veterans. The Congressional Budget Office estimated that enacting S. 1963 would increase direct spending by $6.813 billion.
