= Grand bargain (United States, 2011) =

The Grand bargain was an attempted political compromise during the 2011 budget debates in the United States Congress. Lawmakers were under pressure to pass a budget before automatic spending cuts known as sequestration took effect on August 4, 2011. President Barack Obama advocated historic cuts to social security, Medicare, and Medicaid, in exchange for an increase in federal taxes on upper income individuals, with the goal of reducing the federal deficit.

Moderates from both the Republican and the Democratic party were in favor of the compromise. However, the Tea Party faction of the Republican party firmly objected to tax increases, causing Republican Speaker of the House John Boehner to not support the deal. The progressive faction of the Democratic party was opposed to cuts to social security and the social safety net. An effort to defend Social Security was spearheaded by progressive Senator Bernie Sanders. Due to the opposition arrayed against it, the compromise failed.

Among centrist pundits, hopes for the grand bargain lasted until the resignation of Speaker of the House John Boehner in 2015.

== See also ==
- Deficit reduction in the United States
- National Commission on Fiscal Responsibility and Reform
- Presidency of Barack Obama
