= October 2013 mini-continuing resolutions =

Set of continuing resolutions

The October 2013 mini-continuing resolutions were a set of continuing resolutions that would have provided funding for a limited set of federal agencies during the United States federal government shutdown of 2013. The bills were part of a Republican strategy to fund portions of the government which have bipartisan support, in order to spare those agencies and programs from the effects of the shutdown. The bills all passed the United States House of Representatives during the 113th United States Congress, but (with one exception) were ignored by the United States Senate. These selective continuing resolutions became moot upon the passage of the Continuing Appropriations Act, 2014 which funded the entire government, ending the shutdown.

On October 1, 2013, the federal government shut down due to a failure of the United States Congress to pass any appropriation legislation – regular or in the form of a continuing resolution – in order to fund the government in fiscal year 2014. In reaction to this shutdown, the Republican-led House of Representatives began introducing and passing a series of mini-continuing resolutions that would continue to fund smaller pieces of the government.

The Senate adjourned on October 7, 2013 with no solid plans to vote on any of the mini continuing resolutions on October 8, 2013. This was consistent with previous statements that the Senate would ignore the "piecemeal" or "mini" spending bills that were passed by the House. President Obama released a statement that if he were presented with H.J.Res. 77, he would veto the bill. The statement indicated that the president would veto all mini-appropriations bills because "consideration of appropriations bills in this fashion is not a serious or responsible way to run the United States Government." As a result, chances of the bill becoming law were considered to be "slim to none."

== Background ==
Congress annually considers several appropriations measures, which provide funding for numerous activities. Appropriations measures are under the jurisdiction of the House and Senate Appropriations Committees. In recent years these measures have provided approximately 35% to 39% of total federal spending, with the remainder comprising mandatory spending and net interest on the public debt. If regular bills are not enacted by the beginning of the new fiscal year on October 1, Congress adopts continuing resolutions to continue funding, generally until regular bills are enacted.

Fiscal year 2014 in the United States began on October 1, 2013. At that time, the government shutdown because no money had been appropriated to continue funding the government. Congress had not passed any of the introduced regular appropriation bills from earlier in 2013. In late September 2013, when it became clear that a shutdown was imminent, Congress began working on a continuing resolution, Continuing Appropriations Resolution, 2014 (H.J.Res 59), that would temporarily fund the government. The bill was passed by the House of Representatives on September 20, 2013. It would have funded the government until December 15, 2013, but also included measures to delay the implementation of the Affordable Care Act, commonly known as Obamacare. The Senate stripped the bill of the measures related to the Affordable Care Act, and passed it in revised form on Friday, September 27, 2013. The House put similar measures back and passed it again in the early morning hours on Sunday, September 29. The Senate refused to pass the bill while it still had measures to delay the Affordable Care Act, and the two sides could not develop a compromise bill by midnight on Monday, September 30, 2013, causing the federal government to shut down due to a lack of appropriated funds.

After the shutdown, the House and the Senate both continued to work on legislation that would restore funding to the government. House Republicans began writing "mini-appropriation" bills – continuing resolutions that would fund smaller pieces of the government.

== Provisions in general ==
This summary is based largely on the summary provided by the Congressional Research Service, a public domain source.

Each bill would require the rate of operations for each such account to be calculated to reflect the full amount of any reduction required in FY2013 pursuant to: (1) the Consolidated and Further Continuing Appropriations Act, 2013, and (2) the presidential sequestration order dated March 1, 2013, except as attributable to budget authority made available by the Disaster Relief Appropriations Act, 2013 (P.L. 113-2).

They would also make appropriations and funds made available and authority granted under this joint resolution available until whichever of the following first occurs: (1) enactment into law of an appropriation for any project or activity provided for in this joint resolution, (2) enactment into law of the applicable appropriations Act for FY2014 without any provision for such project or activity, or (3) December 15, 2013.

The bills would require implementation of this joint resolution so that only the most limited funding action be taken in order to provide for continuation of projects and activities.

The bills would authorize amounts made available for civilian personnel compensation and benefits in each agency to be apportioned up to the rate for operations necessary to avoid furloughs in such agencies, consistent with the applicable appropriations Act for FY2013, except that such authority shall not be used until after the agency has taken all necessary actions to reduce or defer non-personnel-related administrative expenses.

== Commentary ==
On October 7, 2013, conservative columnist Jim Geraghty of National Review Online accused Senate Majority Leader Harry Reid of sadism for refusing to bring H.J.Res. 85 and several other mini-continuing resolutions to the Senate floor for a vote, saying that "Harry Reid doesn't want to minimize the pain of the shutdown. He wants to maximize it." Geraghty argued that if Harry Reid did bring these bills to the Senate floor, they would pass.

Speaking in favor of the bill, House Appropriations Chairman Hal Rogers said that "the nine bills the House has passed since Oct. 1 to reopen the government — this will be the tenth — constitute nearly one-third of the federal government's discretionary budget." So, he asked, "why are these bills still sitting on Harry Reid's desk? Why is the Senate not making every stride they can to help our nation's disadvantaged children, hungry families and our veterans?" Democrats responded by repeating their demands that the House pass a "clean" continuing resolution.

== The bills ==
=== National Park Service Operations and Capital Museums ===
National Park Service Operations, Smithsonian Institution, National Gallery of Art, and United States Holocaust Memorial Museum Continuing Appropriations Resolution, 2014
- Long title: Making continuing appropriations for National Park Service operations, the Smithsonian Institution, the National Gallery of Art, and the United States Holocaust Memorial Museum for fiscal year 2014, and for other purposes.
- Nicknames: Open Our National Parks and Museums Act
- Announced in: the 113th United States Congress
- Sponsored by: Rep. Mike Simpson (R-ID)

Legislative history
- Introduced in the House as H.J.Res. 70 by Rep. Mike Simpson (R-ID) on October 1, 2013; Committee consideration by United States House Committee on Appropriations; Passed the House on October 2, 2013 (Roll Call Vote 513: 252-173)

The National Park Service Operations, Smithsonian Institution, National Gallery of Art, and United States Holocaust Memorial Museum Continuing Appropriations Resolution, 2014 (H.J.Res. 70) would provide funding for the National Park Service, which is the United States federal agency that manages all national parks, many national monuments, and other conservation and historical properties. It would also provide funding for the Smithsonian Institution, a group of museums and research centers, and other major museums affected by the shutdown.

The bill would make appropriations for FY2014 for continuing projects or activities that were conducted in FY2013 and for which appropriations, funds, or other authority were made available by the Full-Year Continuing Appropriations Act, 2013 (division F of P.L. 113-6) under the following headings:

- "Department of the Interior--National Park Service--Operation of the National Park System,"
- "United States Holocaust Memorial Museum--Holocaust Memorial Museum,"
- "Smithsonian Institution," and
- "National Gallery of Art."

All 401 units of the National Park System have been closed to the public since the shutdown began, as Congress has not appropriated funding for their operations and maintenance. If H.J.Res. 70 were to pass, it would fund the operation and maintenance of these parks. Some conservative pundits, including Reince Priebus chair of the RNC, and some Republican lawmakers, including U.S. Senator Ted Cruz, have charged that some of the closures are unnecessary and being overzealously enforced at the behest of the Obama administration. The National Park Service has responded that it is legally mandated to protect national park lands and, in the absence of available staff to patrol, maintain and administer the areas, must close them to the public. The vast majority of the agency's staff have been furloughed, leaving only a limited number of law enforcement rangers and firefighters on duty to protect life and property. Richard Seamon, a law professor at the University of Idaho and former assistant solicitor general, told the Christian Science Monitor that the NPS risked vandalism, crime and legal liability if it left its properties open to the public during the shutdown. "If I were a lawyer for the Park Service, I'd advise it in no uncertain terms to close the parks to the public during the government shutdown, because it would be irresponsible to do otherwise. There are bound to be accidents or crimes that would have been avoided or ameliorated had officials been on duty to respond or patrol." Leaving the parks open, he said, "would be a veritable open season for criminals." A number of privately operated enterprises, such as the Claude Moore Colonial Farm, have also been required to close because they operate on or within National Park Service property that has been closed to the public. Various concession-operated visitor amenities have also been closed because the NPS staff who oversee concessionaires have been furloughed, preventing the agency from managing and directing concession operations. Pisgah Inn, a private business on the Blue Ridge Parkway which operates under a concession agreement with the NPS, attempted to defy the closure order. On Oct 4, park rangers blocked the entrance to the inn and turned away visitors.

On the first day of the shutdown, a large group of World War II veterans participating in an Honor Flight trip from Mississippi to the National World War II Memorial ignored the closure by the National Park Service and entered the memorial, alongside members of Congress of both political parties. The National Park Service declared that the gathering was protected by the First Amendment and rangers allowed the veterans to enter. The memorial is normally open to the public and patrolled by the U.S. Park Police 24 hours daily, and staffed by interpretive park rangers from 9:30 a.m. to 11:30 p.m.

=== District of Columbia ===
District of Columbia Continuing Appropriations Resolution, 2014
- Long title: Making continuing appropriations of local funds of the District of Columbia for fiscal year 2014.
- Nicknames: Provide Local Funding for the District of Columbia Act
- Announced in: the 113th United States Congress
- Sponsored by: Rep. Ander Crenshaw (R-FL)

Legislative history
- Introduced in the House as H.J.Res. 71 by Rep. Ander Crenshaw (R-FL) on October 1, 2013; Committee consideration by United States House Committee on Appropriations; Passed the House on October 2, 2013 (voice vote)

The District of Columbia Continuing Appropriations Resolution, 2014 (H.J.Res. 71) would provide funding for Washington, D.C., which has only limited autonomy from the federal government.

The bill would allow the District of Columbia to expend local funds under the heading "District of Columbia Funds" for such programs and activities under title IV of H.R. 2786 (113th Congress), as reported by the Committee on Appropriations of the House of Representatives, at the rate set forth under "District of Columbia Funds--Summary of Expenses" as included in the Fiscal Year 2014 Budget Request Act of 2013 (D.C. Act 20-127), as modified as of the date of the enactment of this joint resolution.

October 9, 2013, District Mayor Vincent C. Gray begged Senate Majority Leader Harry Reid, "Sir, we are not a department of the government. We're simply trying to be able to spend our own money.". Reid replied "I'm on your side. Don't screw it up, okay? Don't screw it up.".

=== Veterans Benefits ===
Veterans Benefits Continuing Appropriations Resolution, 2014
- Long title: Making continuing appropriations for veterans benefits for fiscal year 2014, and for other purposes.
- Nicknames: Honoring Our Promise to America's Veterans Act
- Announced in: the 113th United States Congress
- Sponsored by: Rep. John Culberson (R-TX)

Codification
- Agencies affected: United States Department of Veterans Affairs
- Appropriations: $2,455,490,000

Legislative history
- Introduced in the House as H.J.Res. 72 by Rep. John Culberson (R-TX) on October 1, 2013; Committee consideration by United States House Committee on Appropriations; Passed the House on October 3, 2013 (Roll Call Vote 518: 259-157)

The Veterans Benefits Continuing Appropriations Resolution, 2014 (H.J.Res. 72) would provide funds for the United States Department of Veterans Affairs for "veterans disability payments, the GI Bill, education training, and VA home loans under the same conditions as in effect at the end of the just completed fiscal year."

The bill would make appropriations for FY2014 for veterans' benefits, specifically for entitlements and other mandatory payments whose budget authority was provided in the Military Construction and Veterans Affairs, and Related Agencies Appropriations Act, 2013 (division E of P.L. 113-6), to continue activities at the rate to maintain program levels under current law, under the authority and conditions provided in the applicable appropriations Act for FY2013, to be continued through December 15, 2013. The bill would allow obligations for mandatory payments due on or about the first day of any month that begins after October 2013 but not later than 30 days after December 15, 2013, to continue to be made and makes funds available for such payments.

The bill would provide amounts for "Department of Veterans Affairs--Departmental Administration--General Operating Expenses, Veterans Benefits Administration" at a specified rate for operations, subject to the authority and conditions as provided under P.L. 113-6, and would make them available to the extent and in the manner that would be provided by such Act.

Rep. Culberson argued in favor of the bill by that saying that it was necessary "to ensure that veterans their survivors receive disability compensation benefits," "to make sure that 517,000 low-income veterans and their family members receive their pensions," and "so that three-quarters of a million students will receive their post-9/11 GI education benefits." Democrats argued against passing any bill that doesn't fully fund the entire government. Prior to a vote on H.J.Res. 72, House Democrats tried to force a vote on the Senate-passed continuing resolution but failed to do so.

=== National Guard and reserve forces ===
Pay Our Guard and Reserve Act
- Long title: Making continuing appropriations during a Government shutdown to provide pay and allowances to members of the reserve components of the Armed Forces who perform inactive-duty training during such period.
- Announced in: the 113th United States Congress
- Sponsored by: Rep. Hal Rogers (R-KY)

Legislative history
- Introduced in the House as H.R. 3230 by Rep. Hal Rogers (R-KY) on October 2, 2013; Committee consideration by United States House Committee on Appropriations; Passed the House on October 3, 2013 (Roll Call 516: 265-160)

The Pay Our Guard and Reserve Act (H.R. 3230) would provide funding for the "reserve components of the Armed Forces", a list which is defined as including the Army National Guard of the United States, the Army Reserve, the Navy Reserve, the Marine Corps Reserve, the Air National Guard of the United States, the Air Force Reserve, and the Coast Guard Reserve. The funding would cover "pay and allowances (for) reserve members of the military who participate in inactive-duty training during fiscal year 2014." The Congressional Budget Office reported the bill would result in a budget authority of $5.0 billion. Due to the Pay Our Military Act and other laws related to the shutdown, most of the Pentagon's 800,000 civilian workers and the American military's 1.3 million active-duty soldiers will get paid during the shutdown, but the 800,000 Guardsmen and reservists won't, unless a bill such as the Pay Our Guard and Reserve Act is passed.

The bill would make appropriations for FY2014, for any period during which interim or full-year appropriations for FY2014 are not in effect, for pay and allowances to members of the reserve components of the Armed Forces who perform inactive-duty training during FY2014.

The bill would make such appropriations, funds, and authority granted by this Act available until whichever of the following first occurs: (1) enactment of an appropriation for any purpose for which amounts are made available by this Act, (2) enactment of the applicable regular or continuing appropriations resolution or other Act without any appropriation for such purpose, or (3) January 1, 2015.

The "reserve components of the Armed Forces" are defined in section 10101 of title 10, United States Code. 10 U.S.C. § 10101 states:

The reserve components of the armed forces are:

(1) The Army National Guard of the United States.
(2) The Army Reserve.
(3) The Navy Reserve.
(4) The Marine Corps Reserve.
(5) The Air National Guard of the United States.
(6) The Air Force Reserve.
(7) The Coast Guard Reserve.

The Congressional Budget Office reported the bill would result in a budget authority of $5.0 billion.

Republicans argued that the Pay Our Guard and Reserve Act was necessary to correct an oversight in the Pay Our Military Act that was signed into law by President Obama on September 30, 2013. The bill would fund the military in the event that the federal government was shut down, as it was later that night. Some Republicans argued that it was not an oversight, but an incorrect interpretation of the law by the Department of Defense that was the problem. Representative Candice Miller (R-MI) said that "Secretary of Defense Chuck Hagel has improperly furloughed countless Guardsmen and women across the country, in violation of the intent of law." The Pay Our Military Act only covered pay and allowances for full-time active duty National Guard and reserve members.

Republicans argued that the Pay Our Guard and Reserve Act was a bill that the two sides could cooperate on easily. Speaker of the House John Boehner pointed to the quick passage of the Pay Our Military Act only hours before the shutdown as an example of cooperation between Democrats and Republicans on an important issue. The act ensured that members of the military would still be paid if the federal government shut down. Boehner argued that because this was possible once, "we should have no trouble coming together and extending the same relief to our National Guard and Reserves. These men and women make incredible sacrifices for our country, and they and their families deserve this certainty and fairness. The Senate should send this bill to the president's desk immediately." Representative Martha Roby (R-AL) agreed, saying that "we showed with the Pay Our Military Act that there were some things too important to let politics get in the way of funding. The financial security of our military families certainly is one. But isn't funding for veterans' services one, too? How about paying our national guardsmen and reservists, or making sure we have enough federal disaster funding?"

Democrats remained opposed to the bill, favoring a clean continuing resolution instead. Democrats, such as Rep. Pete Visclosky (D-IN) argued against the bill because "Congress still hasn't dealt with issues like military maintenance and procurement, research and development, and other important issues that would be covered by a full appropriations bill."

In Indiana, Governor Mike Pence announced that "On that first day of the federal shutdown, I ordered the Indiana National Guard to continue paying the 244 federally-reimbursed employees who provide support to the Guard," because "I consider the cost of approximately $33,000 a day a small price to pay for ensuring Indiana is prepared to handle any emergency."

On June 11, 2014, the United States Senate passed H.R. 3230 after changing the name to the Veterans' Access to Care through Choice, Accountability, and Transparency Act of 2014 and completely amending the text. It was used as a legislative vehicle for the new bill.

=== National Institutes of Health ===
National Institutes of Health Continuing Appropriations Resolution, 2014
- Long title: Making continuing appropriations for the National Institutes of Health for fiscal year 2014, and for other purposes.
- Nicknames: Research for Lifesaving Cures Act
- Announced in: the 113th United States Congress
- Sponsored by: Rep. Jack Kingston (R-GA)

Legislative history
- Introduced in the House as H.J.Res. 73 by Rep. Jack Kingston (R-GA) on October 2, 2013; Committee consideration by United States House Committee on Appropriations; Passed the House on October 2, 2013 (Roll Call Vote 514: 254-171)

The National Institutes of Health Continuing Appropriations Resolution, 2014 (H.J.Res. 73) would provide funding for the National Institutes of Health, the primary agency of the United States government responsible for biomedical and health-related research.

The bill would appropriate, out of any money in the Treasury not otherwise appropriated, and out of applicable corporate or other revenues, receipts, and funds, for the National Institutes of Health (NIH) for FY2014, and for other purposes, such amounts as may be necessary, at a rate for operations as provided in the Full-Year Continuing Appropriations Act, 2013 (division F of P.L. 113-6), for continuing projects or activities (including the costs of direct loans and loan guarantees) not otherwise specifically provided for in this joint resolution, that were conducted in FY2013, and for which appropriations, funds, or other authority were made available by such Act to the Department of Health and Human Services (HHS) for NIH under the heading "Department of Health and Human Services--National Institutes of Health."

Republicans criticized Senate Majority Leader Harry Reid for being opposed to passing the bill, which would, among other things, fund programs supporting sick children. Reid, upon being asked if he "would support NIH funding to help even one child with cancer," said "Why would we want to do that?" In response, Democrats criticized Republicans for playing different needy groups off one another by funding bills to support cancer treatment while failing to fund food programs.

=== Special Supplemental Nutrition Program for Women, Infants, and Children ===
Special Supplemental Nutrition Program for Women, Infants, and Children Continuing Appropriations Resolution, 2014
- Long title: Making continuing appropriations for the Special Supplemental Nutrition Program for Women, Infants, and Children for fiscal year 2014, and for other purposes.
- Nicknames: Nutrition Assistance for Low-Income Women and Children Act
- Announced in: the 113th United States Congress
- Sponsored by: Rep. Robert Aderholt (R-AL)

Legislative history
- Introduced in the House as H.J.Res. 75 by Rep. Robert Aderholt (R-AL) on October 3, 2013; Committee consideration by United States House Committee on Appropriations; Passed the House on October 4, 2013 (Roll Call Vote 524: 244-164)

The Special Supplemental Nutrition Program for Women, Infants, and Children Continuing Appropriations Resolution, 2014 (H.J.Res. 75) would provide funding for the Special Supplemental Nutrition Program for Women, Infants and Children, a federal assistance program of the Food and Nutrition Service (FNS) of the United States Department of Agriculture (USDA) for healthcare and nutrition of low-income pregnant women, breastfeeding women, and infants and children under the age of five.

The bill would make appropriations, out of any money in the Treasury not otherwise appropriated, and out of applicable corporate or other revenues, receipts, and funds, for the Department of Agriculture (USDA) for FY2014, and for other purposes, such amounts as may be necessary, at a rate for operations as provided in the Agriculture, Rural Development, Food and Drug Administration, and Related Agencies Appropriations Act, 2013 (division A of P.L. 113-6), for continuing projects or activities (including the costs of direct loans and loan guarantees) that are not otherwise specifically provided for in this joint resolution, that were conducted in FY2013, and for which appropriations, funds, or other authority were made available by such Act under the heading "Department of Agriculture--Domestic Food Programs--Special Supplemental Nutrition Program for Women, Infants, and Children (WIC)."

Republicans argued in favor of the bill, with Rep. Robert Aderholf saying that "the WIC bill is the answer to Democratic complaints that the shutdown is threatening the nutrition of 8.7 million women, infants and children." Democrats argued that this bill did not go far enough because it failed to also fund food stamps. Although 22 Democrats did vote in favor of the bill in the House, most congressional Democrats continued to oppose the piecemeal funding of the government using mini-continuing resolutions, instead favoring the passage of a full continuing resolution.

=== Food and Drug Administration ===
Food and Drug Administration Continuing Appropriations Resolution, 2014
- Long title: Making continuing appropriations for the Food and Drug Administration for fiscal year 2014, and for other purposes.
- Nicknames: Food and Drug Safety Act
- Announced in: the 113th United States Congress
- Sponsored by: Rep. Robert Aderholt (R-AL)

Legislative history
- Introduced in the House as H.J.Res. 77 by Rep. Robert Aderholt (R-AL) on October 3, 2013; Committee consideration by United States House Committee on Appropriations; Passed the House on October 7, 2013 (Roll Call Vote 528: 235-162)

The Food and Drug Administration Continuing Appropriations Resolution, 2014 (H.J.Res. 77) would provide funding for the Food and Drug Administration at the annual rate of $2.3 billion, the same funding it received in FY 2013. The bill funding provided by the bill would enable the FDA to "keep the FDA's important food and drug safety functions in place and also allow it to collect and spend user fees, which help the agency make approval or denial decision on new drugs and devices."

The bill would make appropriations, out of any money in the Treasury not otherwise appropriated, and out of applicable corporate or other revenues, receipts, and funds, for the Food and Drug Administration (FDA) for FY2014, and for other purposes, such amounts as may be necessary, at a rate for operations as provided in the Agriculture, Rural Development, Food and Drug Administration, and Related Agencies Appropriations Act, 2013 (division A of P.L. 113-6), for continuing projects or activities (including the costs of direct loans and loan guarantees) that are not otherwise specifically provided for in this joint resolution, that were conducted in FY2013, and for which appropriations, funds, or other authority were made available by such Act to the United States Department of Health and Human Services (HHS) under the heading "Department of Health and Human Services--Food and Drug Administration."

A week before the shutdown, the FDA was preparing contingency plans in case of a shutdown. One concern was whether the agency would go ahead with ongoing drug reviews and advisory committee meetings, or if those meetings would be postponed. Approximately 45% of the FDA's 14,779 employees will be furloughed. The FDA will stop routine food safety inspections as well as most of its laboratory research. Employees will still handle emergencies and high-risk product recalls. The FDA posted a full list of "Medical Product Activities During the Federal Government Shutdown" with more details on their website. Due to the shutdown, the FDA quit routine inspections of "food manufacturers, warehouses, packers, distributors and other key links in the food production chain," whereas it would normally average 200 a week. The furloughed workers were also responsible for many tasks that involved catching issues or illnesses early, so only small crews are now monitoring consumer complaint databases or monitoring long-term threats. Some FDA staff members are still conducting inspections at U.S. ports.

Republicans argued in favor of the strategy of mini-continuing resolutions as a way to find points of agreement between the two parties in order to fund at least some of the government. Rep. Aderholt argued that Congress should pass the bill because "we need to also limit any damage to the millions of jobs impacted by FDA's work in the food and bio-science industries."

Democrats continued to insist of having a full continuing resolution that would fund the whole government and accused the Republicans of holding the government hostage. However, 20 House Democrats did vote in favor of the bill.

The Editorial Board of The New York Times wrote an op-ed expressing concern over the furlough of many FDA employees, raising the issue that many of the furloughed employees worked on long-term threat assessment issues that weren't considered essential in the short-run. The board's opinion was that "the longer Congressional Republicans allow the shutdown to continue, the greater the danger of harm".

=== Head Start ===
Head Start Continuing Appropriations Resolution, 2014
- Long title: Making continuing appropriations for Head Start for fiscal year 2014, and for other purposes.
- Nicknames: Head Start for Low-Income Children Act
- Announced in: the 113th United States Congress
- Sponsored by: Rep. Hal Rogers (R-KY)

Legislative history
- Introduced in the House as H.J.Res. 84 by Rep. Hal Rogers (R-KY) on October 3, 2013; Committee consideration by United States House Committee on Appropriations; Passed the House on October 8, 2013 (Roll Call 530: 248-168)

The Head Start Continuing Appropriations Resolution, 2014 (H.J.Res. 84) would provide funding for the Head Start Program, a program of the United States Department of Health and Human Services that provides comprehensive education, health, nutrition, and parent involvement services to low-income children and their families. The program's services and resources are designed to foster stable family relationships, enhance children's physical and emotional well-being, and establish an environment to develop strong cognitive skills. The program would receive funding at a pace of $7.586 billion a year, but only through December 15, when the continuing resolution would expire.

The bill would provide funding for the Head Start Program, a program of the United States Department of Health and Human Services that provides comprehensive education, health, nutrition, and parent involvement services to low-income children and their families. The program would receive funding at a pace of $7.586 billion a year, but only through December 15, when the continuing resolution would expire.

The Head Start Continuing Appropriations Resolution, 2014 would make appropriations, out of any money in the Treasury not otherwise appropriated, and out of applicable corporate or other revenues, receipts, and funds, for the Head Start program for FY2014, and for other purposes, such amounts as may be necessary, at a rate for operations as provided in the Full-Year Continuing Appropriations Act, 2013 (division F of P.L. 113-6), for continuing all projects or activities under the Head Start Act (including the costs of direct loans and loan guarantees) that are not otherwise specifically provided for in this joint resolution, that were conducted in FY2013, and for which appropriations, funds, or other authority were made available to the Department of Health and Human Services (HHS) by such Act under the heading "Department of Health and Human Services--Administration for Children and Families, Children and Families Services Programs."

On October 8, 2013, John D. Arnold and his wife Laura donated $10 million to the National Head Start Association in response to the continuing government shutdown. Their donation will help pay for programs in Alabama, Connecticut, Florida, Georgia, South Carolina, and Mississippi, the six states that have either already closed or are about to due to lack of funds. The programs in these six state serve 7,200 children. On November 1, programs in 41 other states and one US territory that serve 86,000 children will also run out of money. If funding is restored, the money will be repaid to the Arnolds as though it was a no-interest loan.

The shutdown also affected many Native American tribes; Head Start programs for American Indian children were among those programs. While no Indian Head Start programs closed immediately, several have grant cycles that would begin on November 1, forcing them to close down if the government shutdown, or a bill such as this one is passed, has not been resolved by then.

=== Federal Emergency Management Agency ===
Federal Emergency Management Agency Continuing Appropriations Resolution, 2014
- Long title: Making continuing appropriations for the Federal Emergency Management Agency for fiscal year 2014, and for other purposes.
- Announced in: the 113th United States Congress
- Sponsored by: Rep. John Carter (R-TX)

Legislative history
- Introduced in the House as H.J.Res. 85 by Rep. John Carter (R-TX) on October 3, 2013; Committee consideration by United States House Committee on Appropriations; Passed the House on October 4, 2013 (Roll Call Vote 522: 247-164)

The Federal Emergency Management Agency Continuing Appropriations Resolution, 2014 (H.J.Res. 85) would provide funding for the Federal Emergency Management Agency, which is responsible for coordinating a response to disasters that occur in the United States and that overwhelm the resources of local and state authorities.

The bill would fund the Federal Emergency Management Agency (FEMA). The agency's primary purpose is to coordinate the response to a disaster that has occurred in the United States and that overwhelms the resources of local and state authorities.

Arguing in favor of the bill, Rep. Carter said that "We have a duty to ensure that our nation is adequately prepared for disasters, so that our states are fully supported with their required federal assistance," especially with a storm gathering in the Gulf. Thirty-two Democrats voted in favor of the bill. Despite this, most Democrats continued to oppose the piecemeal funding of the government using mini-continuing resolutions, instead favoring the passage of a full continuing resolution.

=== Department of Defense Survivor Benefits ===
This was the only one of the resolutions to pass the Senate and be signed into law.

== See also ==
- List of bills in the 113th United States Congress
- United States federal government shutdown of 2013
- Continuing Appropriations Resolution, 2014 (H.J.Res 59)
- Appropriation bill
- Continuing resolution
