= Continuing Appropriations Resolution, 2014 =

Act of the 113th United States Congress

- Long title: Making continuing appropriations for fiscal year 2014, and for other purposes.
- Announced in: the 113th United States Congress
- Sponsored by: Rep. Harold Rogers (R, KY-5)
- Number of co-sponsors: 0

Codification
- Acts affected: Balanced Budget and Emergency Deficit Control Act of 1985, Social Security Act, Public Health Service Act, Continuing Appropriations Resolution, 2013, and others
- U.S.C. sections affected: 31 U.S.C. § 1513, 22 U.S.C. § 2412, 50 U.S.C. § 3094(a)(1), 7 U.S.C. § 1736b, 40 U.S.C. § 14704, and others
- Agencies affected: United States Department of Agriculture, United States Department of the Interior, Department of Homeland Security, U.S. Immigration and Customs Enforcement, United States Department of Defense

Legislative history
- Introduced in the House as H.J.Res. 59 by Rep. Harold Rogers (R, KY-5) on September 10, 2013; Committee consideration by United States House Committee on Appropriations, United States House Committee on the Budget; Passed the House on September 20, 2013 (Roll Call Vote 478: 230-189)

The Continuing Appropriations Resolution, 2014 (H.J.Res. 59) is a bill that was introduced into the United States House of Representatives on September 10, 2013. The original text of the bill was for a continuing resolution that would make continuing appropriations for the fiscal year 2014 United States federal budget. Though versions of the bill passed each house of Congress, the House and Senate were not able to reconcile the bills and pass a compromise measure.

The original continuing resolution passed the House on September 20. When it first passed the House, the bill included provisions that would defund the Affordable Care Act. The Senate refused to adopt the resolution because of those provisions, and amended the bill to remove them before passing it. The House replaced the provisions that would defund the Affordable Care Act. The Senate refused to take up the measure and no continuing resolution of any kind was passed. This resulted in the government shutdown that began on October 1. A different bill, the Continuing Appropriations Act, 2014, was signed into law on October 17, 2013 and ended the shutdown.

Two months later, the bill became the vehicle for the compromise budget proposal of Representative Paul Ryan and Senator Patty Murray, known as the Bipartisan Budget Act of 2013. The bill was amended to completely replace the existing text of H.J.Res. 59 with the text of the "Bipartisan Budget Act of 2013."

== Provisions ==
This summary is based largely on the summary provided by the Congressional Research Service, a public domain source.

The Continuing Appropriations Resolution, 2014 would make continuing appropriations for FY2014 for the United States federal government. The bill would appropriate amounts for continuing operations, projects, or activities which were conducted in FY2013 and for which appropriations, funds, or other authority were made available in:

- the Agriculture, Rural Development, Food and Drug Administration, and Related Agencies Appropriations Act, 2013 (division A of P.L. 113-6);
- the Commerce, Justice, Science, and Related Agencies Appropriations Act, 2013 (division B of P.L. 113-6);
- the Department of Defense Appropriations Act, 2013 (division C of P.L. 113-6);
- the Department of Homeland Security Appropriations Act, 2013 (division D of P.L. 113-6);
- the Military Construction and Veterans Affairs and Related Agencies Appropriations Act, 2013 (division E of P.L. 113-6); and
- The Full-Year Continuing Appropriations Act, 2013 (division F of P.L. 113-6).

The bill would require the rate for operations for each account to be calculated to reflect the full amount of any reduction required in FY2013 pursuant to:

- any provision of division G of the Consolidated and Further Continuing Appropriations Act, 2013 (P.L. 113-6); and
- the presidential sequestration order dated March 1, 2013, except as attributable to budget authority made available by: (1) the Continuing Appropriations Resolution, 2013 (P.L. 112-175); or (2) the Disaster Relief Appropriations Act, 2013 (P.L. 113-2).

The bill would also provide funding under this joint resolution until whichever of the following first occurs: (1) enactment of an appropriation for any project or activity provided for in it; (2) enactment of the applicable appropriations Act for FY2014 without any provision for such project or activity; or (3) December 15, 2013. The Continuing Appropriations Resolution, 2014 would also authorize continuation of other specified activities (including those for entitlements and other mandatory payments) through such date.

The bill would allow amounts made available for the Department of Commerce—National Oceanic and Atmospheric Administration (NOAA)--Procurement, Acquisition and Construction to be apportioned up to the rate for operations necessary to maintain the planned launch schedules for the Joint Polar Satellite System and the Geostationary Operational Environmental Satellite system.

Finally, the bill would make appropriations for payment to Bonnie Englebardt Lautenberg, widow of Frank R. Lautenberg, a former Senator from New Jersey.

== Defunding the Affordable Care Act ==
Before passing the bill, the House adopted the "Scalise Amendment." The amendment would prohibit "the funding of any provision of the Patient Protection and Affordable Care Act or Title I and subtitle B of Title II of the Health Care and Education Reconciliation Act of 2010." Senate Democrats and President Barack Obama immediately announced that they would not approve the measure. The Senate removed this provision from the bill before passing their own version and sending the modified bill back to the House. The final Continuing Appropriations bill sent from the House to the Senate was to delay the employee mandate IRS penalty the same as the previously delayed employer mandate and to not exempt Congress from the ACA.

== Procedural history ==
=== Introduction in the House ===
House Joint Resolution 59 was introduced on September 10, 2013 by Rep. Harold Rogers (R, KY-5). It was referred to both the United States House Committee on Appropriations and the United States House Committee on the Budget. On September 20, 2013, the House voted in Roll Call Vote 478 to pass the bill 230-189.

=== The Senate's first response ===
The Senate was expected to debate the bill during the afternoon of September 23, 2013. The Senate Democrats were expected to try to remove the language from the bill that defunds the Affordable Care Act, while Senate Republicans were expected to oppose such a move. Senator Mike Lee said on Meet the Press that Senate Republicans push to the verge of a government shutdown, but that "the government will be funded." The House cancelled a planned week of recess with the expectation that they would receive a revised version of the bill back from the Senate during that time. The Senate worked on the bill from September 23 to September 27. On September 27, the Senate voted in Roll Call Vote 209 54-44 to amend the bill to remove the language that defunded the Affordable Care Act. That vote was made after a vote to move forward with working on the bill, one which many Republicans voted in favor of. This maneuver allowed the Senate to vote on the bill, even with the Affordable Care Act provisions removed, in order to send the bill back to the House. The Senate Republican leadership made this decision to avoid Senate Republicans from being blamed for the, then potential, government shutdown by leaving the next move up to the House. Republicans were split on the move, however, with 25 Republicans voting in favor of ending debate (thus allowed a vote on the bill) and 19 voting against it (which would prevent the Democrats from easily rewriting the bill to remove the Affordable Care Act provisions). The Republicans opposed to this were primarily led by Senator Ted Cruz. All Republicans did vote against the final passage of the law, once the Affordable Care Act provisions had been stripped out, a sign, according to Senate Minority Leader McConnell, that Republicans were unified in their opposition to the Affordable Care Act itself.

That afternoon, after the bill had been passed, Senate Majority Leader Harry Reid announced that the Senate would not be working on the legislation any more, so if the House wanted to avoid a shutdown, they would have to approve the Senate version. In addition to removing the Affordable Care Act provisions, the Senate version would also only fund the government until November 15, 2013. Reid made this announcement when he closed the Senate for the weekend, to reopen at 2pm on Monday, September 30, 2013.

=== Second House version ===
On Saturday, September 28, 2013, the House met in order to respond to the Senate's amended version of H.J.Res 59. The debate was contentious. That afternoon, the House Republicans released the text of two amendments they planned to offer to the version of the bill they had received from the Senate. One amendment would delay the implementation of the Affordable Care Act for one year, while the other amendment would repeal the 2.3% tax on medical devices. Together, they would also change the bill to fund the government through December 15, 2013, instead of November 15, 2013, as the Senate preferred. The Republican leadership set up a meeting for 8:30 pm that evening to let Republican members know about the bill and their strategy, with the expectation that the vote would happen later that evening. According to one Republican staffer, the strategy the House Republican leadership was pursuing was to get the bill passed as quickly as possible in order to do two things. First, they hoped that the speed at which the House was working and passing legislation would contrast well with the Senate's slower pace. Second, they thought that if Senator Cruz and his supporters in the Senate were unable to get the House's version passed in the Senate, they would be blamed for the government shutdown, instead of the House Republicans receiving the blame.

In the very early morning on Sunday, September 29, 2013, the House voted in favor of the newly amended H.J. Res 59, sending it back to the Senate after adopting both amendments. The Senate Majority Leader announced that it was "dead" in the upper chamber and President Obama threatened to veto it. This occurred approximately 48 hours before the government would have been shut down if an agreement was not reached.

=== Senate and House reactions ===
The Senate responded by again removing the language about the Affordable Care Act, and passing a "clean" bill.

House Republicans reported that their next attempt would be to delay the individual mandate and end the employer healthcare contribution for members of Congress and their staff. The amended bill was sent to the Senate where it was tabled.

No compromise occurred before the end of the day. After the failure of Congress to pass H.J.Res. 59 (or any other continuing resolution), the United States federal government shut down on October 1, 2013. The House and the Senate both continued to work on legislation that would restore funding to the government. House Republicans chose to begin writing "mini-appropriation" bills - continuing resolutions that would fund smaller pieces of the government. Finally, on October 16, 2013, Congress passed the similarly-named Continuing Appropriations Act, 2014, which ended both the government shutdown and debt-ceiling crisis.

=== Bipartisan Budget Act of 2013 ===
Two months later, the bill became the vehicle for the compromise budget proposal of Representative Paul Ryan and Senator Patty Murray, known as the Bipartisan Budget Act of 2013. On December 10, 2013, pursuant to the provisions of the Continuing Appropriations Act, 2014 calling for a joint budget conference to work on possible compromises, Representative Paul Ryan and Senator Patty Murray announced a compromise spending/budget proposal that they had agreed to. They chose to introduce the text as an amendment to H.J.Res. 59. The amendment was to completely replace the existing text of H.J.Res. 59 with the text of the "Bipartisan Budget Act of 2013."

== Debate ==
There were two main, interconnected debates over the original continuing resolution. The first debate was whether to defund the Affordable Care Act, with most Republicans in favor of doing so, and most Democrats opposed to it. The second debate was whether it was worth shutting down the government, or risking a shutdown, in order to accomplish this goal. A few other provisions were debated, but most attention was directed at defunding the Affordable Care Act and the eventual government shutdown.

The primary provision under debate was the provision that would defund the Affordable Care Act (colloquially known as Obamacare). The House passed a measure that included this provision. The Senate removed it and sent back what it called a "clean" bill. In the second version of the H.J.Res 59 that the House passed, the House added an amendment that would delay the implementation of the Affordable Care Act for one year. House Republicans argued that this delay was "necessary to prepare a wary public for sweeping changes that lack the underlying infrastructure to make them work" and considered it a compromise position in comparison to their earlier efforts to defund the bill entirely.

Although most Republicans wanted to defund the Affordable Care Act, Republicans in each chamber were split on how far to push the situation, since a failure to pass a continuing resolution would result in a government shutdown on October 1, 2013. Steve King of Iowa spoke out in favor of a shutdown, believing that it would help Republicans achieve their goal of defunding the Affordable Care Act. King argued that there were examples of government shutdowns in the past that did not do devastating damage and were successfully used by one party to achieve their desired goals.

=== Other aspects ===
The National Education Association (NEA) wrote an open letter to the House opposing H.J.Res 59. The NEA urged representatives to vote no because the bill "continues the devastating cuts to education set in motion by the sequester and permanently defunds the Affordable Care Act." The organization states that they may decide to use the vote on this bill in their NEA Legislative Report Card for the 113th Congress.

One controversial provision of the bill was section 134, which stated that "notwithstanding any other provision of this joint resolution, there is appropriated for payment to Bonnie Englebardt Lautenberg, widow of Frank R. Lautenberg, late a Senator from New Jersey, $174,000." The non-profit organization Citizens for Responsibility and Ethics in Washington protested the inclusion of this in the bill, since the senator's assets in 2011 were over $57 million. The group questioned why this "death gratuity" was considered a "top funding priority."

== See also ==
- List of bills in the 113th United States Congress
- Continuing resolution
- Consolidated and Further Continuing Appropriations Act, 2013
- Pay Our Military Act (H.R. 3210; 113th Congress) - a bill that would ensure the military is paid during the shutdown
- United States federal government shutdown of 2013 - 16-day shutdown of the federal government as a result of the failure of Congress to pass appropriations for Fiscal Year 2014
- Budget sequestration in 2013 - information about the 2013 sequestration
- Budget sequestration - the general practice of budget sequestration
- 2014 United States federal budget - information about the FY 2014 budget passed solely by the House and the separate FY 2014 budget passed solely by the Senate during the spring of 2013, as well as the proposed Obama FY 2014 budget. None of these proposed budgets were ever adopted as the FY 2014 budget.
- Continuing Appropriations Act, 2014 - bill that ended the 2013 federal government shutdown by providing funding for part of FY 2014 until a budget deal (such as this one) could be reached or January 15, 2014.
