= Pay Our Military Act =

2013 United States federal law

- Long title: Making continuing appropriations for military pay in the event of a Government shutdown.
- Announced in: the 113th United States Congress
- Sponsored by: Rep. Mike Coffman (R-CO)
- Number of co-sponsors: 4

Codification
- Agencies affected: Armed Forces of the United States, United States Coast Guard, Department of Defense, Department of Homeland Security
- Appropriations: an unlimited amount in fiscal year 2014

Legislative history
- Introduced in the House as H.R. 3210 by Mike Coffman (R–CO) on September 28, 2013; Passed the House on September 29, 2013 (Roll Call Vote 499: 423-0); Passed the Senate on September 30, 2013 (unanimous consent); Signed into law by President Barack Obama on September 30, 2013

The Pay Our Military Act (H.R. 3210) is a United States federal law that appropriates funds for fiscal year 2014 to pay members of the United States Armed Forces in the event that the federal government shut down. The bill was signed into law on September 30, 2013, only hours before the government officially shut down.

The bill was interpreted by lawyers from the Defense and Justice departments to allow nearly all civilian Defense personnel to return to work as well, on the basis that they "contribute to the morale, well-being, capabilities and readiness of service members."

== Background ==
Due to the failure of the United States Congress to agree to pass regular appropriations before the start of the 2014 fiscal year, it was necessary to pass a continuing resolution in order to temporarily fund the government. The House proposed and passed H.J.Res 59, a continuing resolution, which included a provision to defund the Patient Protection and Affordable Care Act (ACS or "Obamacare"). The Senate removed that provision every time it was added, and the two sides were unable to agree on a resolution, thus the government shut down.

== Provisions of the bill ==
The bill would "appropriate funds to pay the military at any time in FY 2014 when appropriations are not in effect," a situation which would include any potential shutdown. The bill would also allow "the government to keep paying civilian personnel and contractors that the Defense Department deems to be helping the military."

== Procedural history ==
The Pay Our Military Act was introduced on September 28, 2013, by Rep. Mike Coffman (R-CO). The bill passed the House by 423–0 on September 29, 2013, in Roll Call Vote 499. The bill was then sent to the Senate, which voted on September 30, 2013, to pass the bill by unanimous consent. The bill was signed into law on September 30, 2013, only hours before the government officially shut down.

== Debate ==
Speaking in approval of the bill after it had been signed by the President, Representative Martha Roby (R-AL) said that "We showed with the Pay Our Military Act that there were some things too important to let politics get in the way of funding." Speaker of the House John Boehner later pointed to the quick passage of the Pay Our Military Act only hours before the shutdown as an example of cooperation between Democrats and Republicans on an important issue when he argued in favor of additional cooperation to ensure that the National Guard and Reserves also would be paid.

== Effects ==
As of October 6, the Pay Our Military Act (POMA) was interpreted by lawyers from the Defense and Justice departments to allow nearly all civilian Defense personnel to return to work, on the basis that they "contribute to the morale, well-being, capabilities and readiness of service members." Passage of the bill enabled Secretary of Defense Chuck Hagel to recall 1,000 National Guard federal technicians in Indiana back to work.

== See also ==
- List of bills in the 113th United States Congress
- United States federal government shutdown of 2013
- Continuing Appropriations Resolution, 2014 (H.J.Res 59; 113th Congress)
