= United States House Committee on the Budget =

Standing committee of the United States House of Representatives

House Budget Committee
Standing committee
- Active United States House of Representatives; 119th Congress

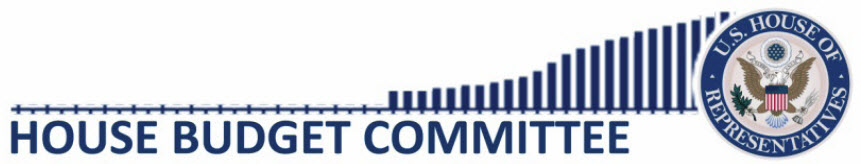

History
- Formed: 1974

Leadership
- Chair: Jodey Arrington (R); Since January 3, 2023
- Ranking Member: Brendan F. Boyle (D); Since January 3, 2023

Structure
- Seats: 37 (37 currently filled) 21/21 16/16
- Political parties: Majority (21): Republican (21); Minority (16): Democratic (16)

Jurisdiction
- Senate counterpart: Senate Budget Committee

Meeting place
- 204, Cannon House Office Building; Washington, D.C. 20515

Website
- budget.house.gov (Republican) democrats-budget.house.gov (Democratic)

Phone number
- (202)-226-7270

The United States House Committee on the Budget, commonly known as the House Budget Committee, is a standing committee of the United States House of Representatives. Its responsibilities include legislative oversight of the federal budget process, reviewing all bills and resolutions on the budget, and monitoring agencies and programs funded outside of the budgetary process. The committee briefly operated as a select committee in 1919 and 1921, during the 66th and 67th United States Congresses, before being made a standing committee in 1974.

== Role of the committee ==
The primary responsibility of the Budget Committee is the drafting and preparation of the Concurrent Resolution on the Budget, commonly referred to as the "budget resolution". This resolution sets the aggregate levels of revenue and spending that is expected to occur in a given fiscal year. A budget resolution by law must be enacted by Congress by April 15. This target date is rarely met, and in at least four years (FY1999, FY2003, FY2005, and FY2007) no budget resolution was ultimately adopted. This resolution also gives to each committee of the House an "allocation" of "new budget authority". This allocation is important in the consideration of legislation on the floor of the House. If a bill comes to the floor to be considered and it causes an increase in spending above this allocation, it is subject to a point of order (under 302(f) of the Congressional Budget Act). This is true for discretionary spending (spending that is provided to the Federal Government each year) and mandatory spending (spending such as entitlements where a beneficiary class is defined and a benefit is provided). If an entitlement is expanded and it has not been budgeted for in the budget resolution, it is subject to a point of order on the floor and, if not waived, will prevent it from being called up for consideration (if a Member of Congress stands before the body and makes the point of order).

In general, legislation is cleared of such problems prior to consideration through discussions between the House Parliamentarian, the House Leadership, and the House Budget Committee.

The committee holds hearings on federal budget legislation and congressional resolutions related to the federal budget process. The committee holds hearings on the president's annual budget request to Congress and drafts the annual Congressional Budget Resolution, which sets overall spending guidelines for Congress as it develops the annual federal appropriations bills. The committee also reviews supplemental budget requests submitted by the president, which cover items which for one reason or another were not included in the original budget request, usually for emergency spending. Recently, emergency budget supplementals have been used to request funding for the wars in Iraq and Afghanistan as well as for disaster recovery after Hurricanes Katrina and Rita. The committee may amend, approve, or table budget-related bills. It also has the power to enforce established federal budget rules, hold budget-related investigations, and subpoena witnesses. Additionally, the committee has oversight of the Congressional Budget Office.

== Rules of the committee ==
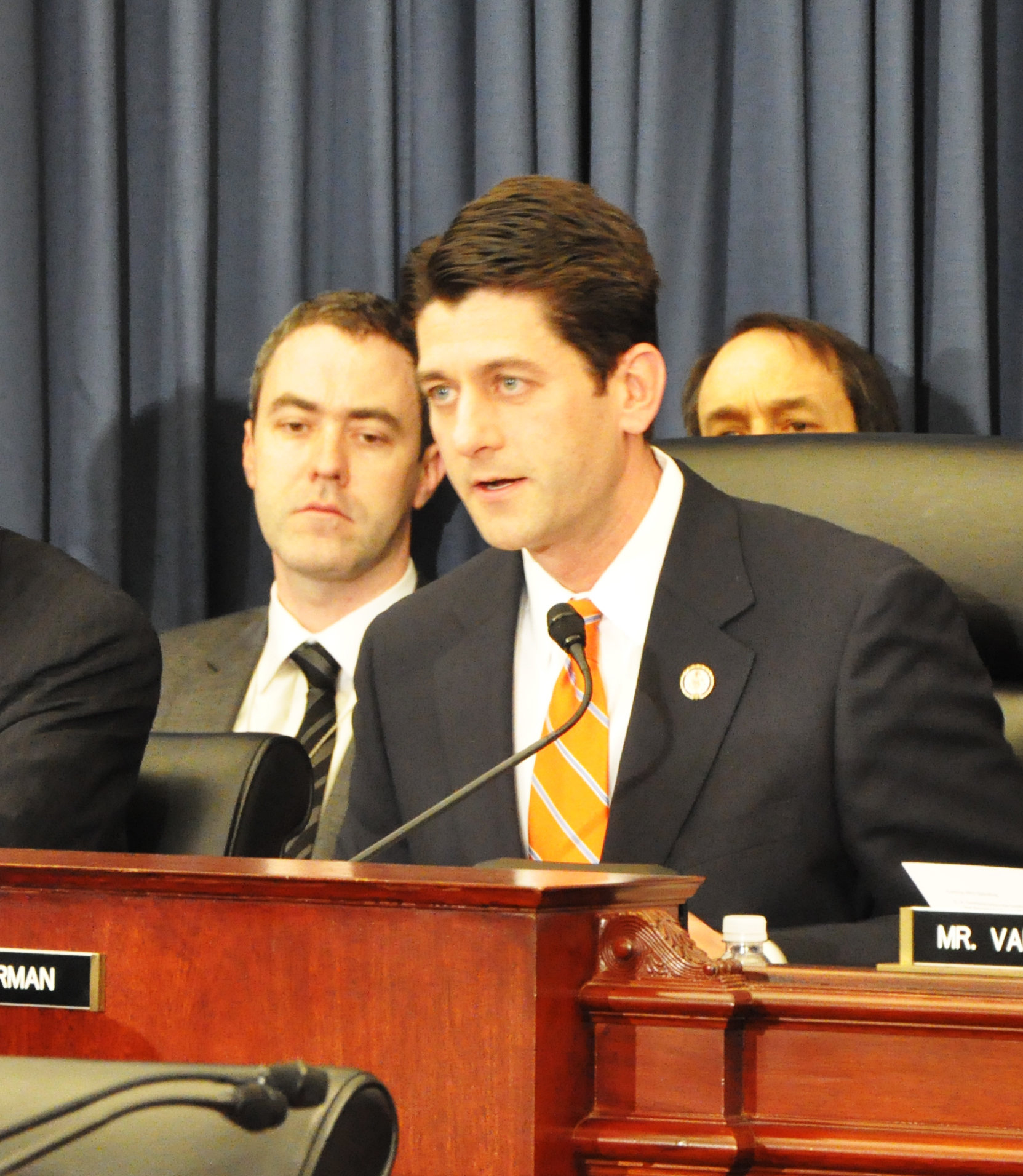
Paul Ryan (R) chairing a meeting of the Committee on the Budget

The committee meets on the second Wednesday of each month while the House is in session. Though this is required, it is almost always waived and the committee only meets when a subject of sufficient importance arises. This usually occurs during the early part of the calendar year when the president's budget is issued and important budgetary decisions must be made.

It is not permitted to conduct business unless a quorum is present. For hearings, two members must be present for a hearing to begin. For a business meeting, such as a "mark-up" of a legislative document, a majority of its members must be present. If a bill is passed out of committee without the requisite quorum, it may be subject to a point of order on the floor of the U.S. House of Representatives.

The committee may only consider measures placed before it either by the chair or by a majority vote of its members.

Each member of the committee may question witnesses during hearings, in order of seniority when the hearing is called to order. Otherwise, members are recognized in order of their arrival after the gavel has brought the committee to order.

== Committee members ==
The committee is chaired by Republican Jodey Arrington from Texas. The ranking member is Democrat Brendan Boyle from Pennsylvania.

Also under House rules, unlike other committees of the House of Representatives, membership on the Budget Committee is term limited. Rank-and-file members must rotate off the committee after serving for three terms. Chairs and ranking members may serve no more than four terms. (See Clause 5 of Rule X of the Rules of the House of Representatives). These limits are often waived, as they have been for John Kasich (R-OH), Jim Nussle (R-IA) and John Spratt (D-SC). Such a waiver requires a vote of the whole House, and is usually included in the opening day "Rules Package" that sets the rules for each successive Congress. Such a resolution is normally introduced as "House Resolution 5" or "House Resolution 6".

Several high-profile budget committee members have gone on to serve as Director of the Office of Management and Budget: Leon Panetta (budget committee chair 1989–1993), Rob Portman (budget committee vice chair) and Jim Nussle (budget committee chair 2001–2007). Additionally, John Kasich (chair 1995–2001) went on to serve as Governor of Ohio from 2011 to 2019, while Paul Ryan (chair 2011–2015) was the Republican nominee for vice president in 2012 and the House speaker from 2015 to 2019.

== Members, 119th Congress ==
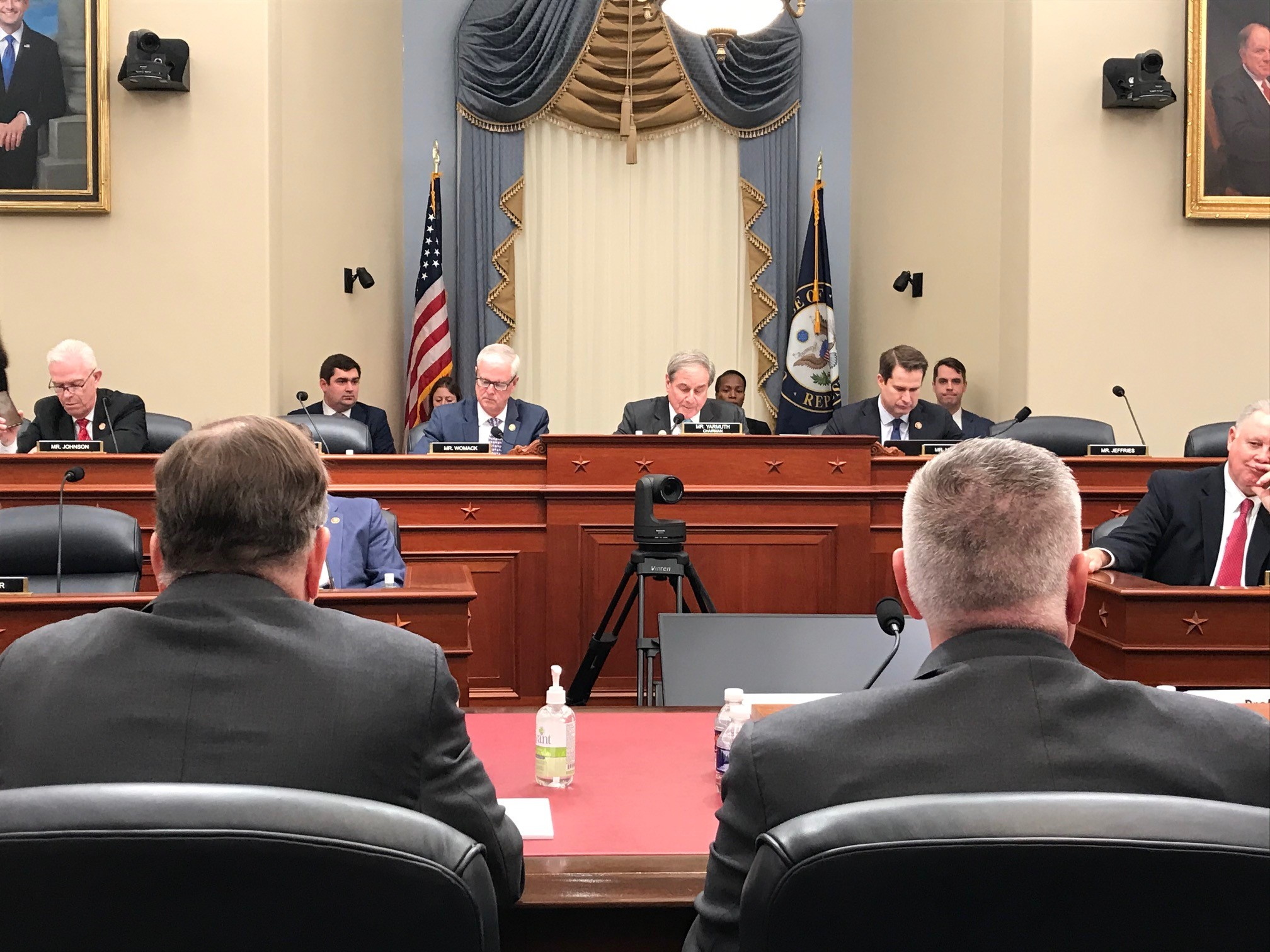
Steve Womack, ranking member, and John Yarmuth, chair, during a meeting in March 2020

Majority	Minority
Jodey Arrington, Texas, Chair; Ralph Norman, South Carolina; Tom McClintock, California; Glenn Grothman, Wisconsin; Lloyd Smucker, Pennsylvania; Buddy Carter, Georgia; Ben Cline, Virginia; Jack Bergman, Michigan; Chip Roy, Texas; Marlin Stutzman, Indiana; Blake Moore, Utah; Ron Estes, Kansas; Josh Brecheen, Oklahoma; Jay Obernolte, California; Mike Carey, Ohio; Chuck Edwards, North Carolina; Andrew Clyde, Georgia; Erin Houchin, Indiana; Addison McDowell, North Carolina; Brandon Gill, Texas; Tim Moore, North Carolina	Brendan Boyle, Pennsylvania, Ranking Member; Lloyd Doggett, Texas; Bobby Scott, Virginia; Scott Peters, California; Jimmy Panetta, California; Bonnie Watson Coleman, New Jersey; Stacey Plaskett, U.S. Virgin Islands; Veronica Escobar, Texas; Ilhan Omar, Minnesota; Becca Balint, Vermont; Marcy Kaptur, Ohio; Pramila Jayapal, Washington; Judy Chu, California (from February 5, 2025); Paul Tonko, New York; Morgan McGarvey, Kentucky; Gabe Amo, Rhode Island

Resolutions electing members: H.Res. 13 (Chair), H.Res. 14 (Ranking Member), H.Res. 54 (R), H.Res. 55 (D), H.Res. 108 (Chu)

== Leadership ==
A full list of former House Budget Committee compositions is on the committee's Democratic website. Previous committee chairs and ranking members are below.

Chairs
Name	Party	State	Start	End
Al Ullman	Democratic	OR	1974	1975
Brock Adams	Democratic	WA	1975	1977
Robert Giaimo	Democratic	CT	1977	1981
Jim Jones	Democratic	OK	1981	1985
Bill Gray	Democratic	PA	1985	1989
Leon Panetta	Democratic	CA	1989	1993
Martin Sabo	Democratic	MN	1993	1995
John Kasich	Republican	OH	1995	2001
Jim Nussle	Republican	IA	2001	2007
John Spratt	Democratic	SC	2007	2011
Paul Ryan	Republican	WI	2011	2015
Tom Price	Republican	GA	2015	2017
Diane Black	Republican	TN	2017	2018
Steve Womack	Republican	AR	2018	2019
John Yarmuth	Democratic	KY	2019	2023
Jodey Arrington	Republican	TX	2023	present

Ranking members
Name	Party	State	Start	End
John Rhodes	Republican	AZ	1974	1975
Del Latta	Republican	OH	1975	1989
Bill Frenzel	Republican	MN	1989	1991
Bill Gradison	Republican	OH	1991	1993
John Kasich	Republican	OH	1993	1995
Martin Sabo	Democratic	MN	1995	1997
John Spratt	Democratic	SC	1997	2007
Paul Ryan	Republican	WI	2007	2011
Chris Van Hollen	Democratic	MD	2011	2017
John Yarmuth	Democratic	KY	2017	2019
Steve Womack	Republican	AR	2019	2021
Jason Smith	Republican	MO	2021	2023
Brendan Boyle	Democratic	PA	2023	present

== Historical membership rosters ==
=== 118th Congress ===
Majority	Minority
Jodey Arrington, Texas, Chair; Ralph Norman, South Carolina; Tom McClintock, California; Glenn Grothman, Wisconsin; Lloyd Smucker, Pennsylvania; Michael Burgess, Texas; Buddy Carter, Georgia; Ben Cline, Virginia; Bob Good, Virginia; Jack Bergman, Michigan; Drew Ferguson, Georgia; Chip Roy, Texas; Blake Moore, Utah; David Valadao, California; Ron Estes, Kansas; Stephanie Bice, Oklahoma (until January 9, 2024); Lisa McClain, Michigan; Michelle Fischbach, Minnesota; Rudy Yakym, Indiana; Josh Brecheen, Oklahoma; Chuck Edwards, North Carolina (from January 10, 2024); Greg Lopez, Colorado (from July 8, 2024)	Brendan Boyle, Pennsylvania, Ranking Member; Brian Higgins, New York; Jan Schakowsky, Illinois; Earl Blumenauer, Oregon; Dan Kildee, Michigan; Scott Peters, California; Barbara Lee, California; Lloyd Doggett, Texas; Jimmy Panetta, California; Jennifer Wexton, Virginia; Sheila Jackson Lee, Texas (until July 19, 2024); Ilhan Omar, Minnesota, Vice Ranking Member; David Trone, Maryland; Becca Balint, Vermont; Bobby Scott, Virginia; Adriano Espaillat, New York

Resolutions electing members: H.Res. 14 (Chair), H.Res. 15 (Ranking Member), H.Res. 102 (D), H.Res. 103 (R), H.Res. 164 (D), H.Res. 205 (amending rank), H.Res. 954 (R)

=== 117th Congress ===
Majority	Minority
John Yarmuth, Kentucky, Chair; Hakeem Jeffries, New York; Brian Higgins, New York; Brendan Boyle, Pennsylvania, Vice Chair; Lloyd Doggett, Texas; David Price, North Carolina; Jan Schakowsky, Illinois; Dan Kildee, Michigan; Joseph Morelle, New York; Steven Horsford, Nevada; Barbara Lee, California; Judy Chu, California; Stacey Plaskett, U.S. Virgin Islands; Jennifer Wexton, Virginia; Bobby Scott, Virginia; Sheila Jackson Lee, Texas; Jim Cooper, Tennessee; Albio Sires, New Jersey; Scott Peters, California; Seth Moulton, Massachusetts; Pramila Jayapal, Washington	Jason Smith, Missouri, Ranking Member; Blake Moore, Utah (since June 22, 2022); Trent Kelly, Mississippi; Tom McClintock, California; Glenn Grothman, Wisconsin; Lloyd Smucker, Pennsylvania; Chris Jacobs, New York; Michael Burgess, Texas; Buddy Carter, Georgia; Ben Cline, Virginia; Lauren Boebert, Colorado; Byron Donalds, Florida; Randy Feenstra, Iowa; Bob Good, Virginia; Ashley Hinson, Iowa; Jay Obernolte, California; Marjorie Taylor Greene, Georgia (until February 4, 2021); Carol Miller, West Virginia (since September 20, 2021); Mike Carey, Ohio (since December 1, 2021); Joe Sempolinski, New York (since September 13, 2022)

Resolutions electing members: H.Res. 9 (Chair), H.Res. 10 (Ranking Member), H.Res. 62 (D), H.Res. 63 (R), H.Res. 91 (removing Marjorie Taylor Greene), H.Res. 95 (R), H.Res. 122 (R), H.Res. 658 (R), H.Res. 826 (R), H.Res. 1197 (R), H.Res. 1340 (R)

=== 116th Congress ===
Majority	Minority
John Yarmuth, Kentucky, Chair; Barbara Lee, California; Seth Moulton, Massachusetts; Hakeem Jeffries, New York; Brian Higgins, New York; Brendan Boyle, Pennsylvania; Rosa DeLauro, Connecticut; Lloyd Doggett, Texas; David Price, North Carolina; Jan Schakowsky, Illinois; Dan Kildee, Michigan; Jimmy Panetta, California; Joe Morelle, New York; Steven Horsford, Nevada; Bobby Scott, Virginia; Sheila Jackson Lee, Texas; Pramila Jayapal, Washington; Ilhan Omar, Minnesota; Jim Cooper, Tennessee; Ro Khanna, California; Scott Peters, California; Albio Sires, New Jersey	Steve Womack, Arkansas, Ranking Member; Rob Woodall, Georgia; Bill Johnson, Ohio, Vice Ranking Member; Jason Smith, Missouri; Bill Flores, Texas; George Holding, North Carolina; Chris Stewart, Utah; Ralph Norman, South Carolina; Kevin Hern, Oklahoma (since July 10, 2019); Chip Roy, Texas; Dan Meuser, Pennsylvania; William Timmons, South Carolina; Dan Crenshaw, Texas; Tim Burchett, Tennessee; Chris Jacobs, New York (since July 21, 2020)

Sources: H.Res. 7 (Chair), H.Res. 8 (Ranking Member), H.Res. 73 (D), H.Res. 74 (R), H.Res. 125 (D), H.Res. 481 (R), H.Res. 870 (D), H.Res. 1058 (R)

=== 115th Congress ===
Majority	Minority
Steve Womack, Arkansas, Chair; Diane Black, Tennessee; Mario Díaz-Balart, Florida; Tom Cole, Oklahoma; Tom McClintock, California; Todd Rokita, Indiana, Vice Chair; Rob Woodall, Georgia; Mark Sanford, South Carolina; Dave Brat, Virginia; Glenn Grothman, Wisconsin; Gary Palmer, Alabama; Bruce Westerman, Arkansas; Jim Renacci, Ohio; Bill Johnson, Ohio; Jason Lewis, Minnesota; Jack Bergman, Michigan; John Faso, New York; Lloyd Smucker, Pennsylvania; Matt Gaetz, Florida; Jodey Arrington, Texas; Drew Ferguson, Georgia	John Yarmuth, Kentucky, Ranking Member; Barbara Lee, California; Michelle Lujan Grisham, New Mexico; Seth Moulton, Massachusetts; Hakeem Jeffries, New York; Brian Higgins, New York; Suzan DelBene, Washington; Debbie Wasserman Schultz, Florida; Brendan Boyle, Pennsylvania; Ro Khanna, California; Pramila Jayapal, Washington, Vice Ranking Member; Salud Carbajal, California; Sheila Jackson Lee, Texas; Jan Schakowsky, Illinois

Sources: H.Res. 6 (Chair), H.Res. 7 (Ranking Member), H.Res. 36 (R), H.Res. 45, H.Res. 52, H.Res. 95 (D), H.Res. 131 (R)

== Major legislation reported out of the committee ==
- U.S. House Fiscal Year 2014 Budget (H. Con. Res. 25; 113th Congress) - was reported out of the Budget Committee on March 15, 2013, and introduced by Committee Chair Paul Ryan to the House floor. It passed the House on March 21, 2013, 221–207.

== See also ==
- List of United States House of Representatives committees
