= Department of Homeland Security Appropriations Act, 2014 =

Proposed United States Law

- Long title: Making appropriations for the Department of Homeland Security for the fiscal year ending September 30, 2014, and for other purposes.
- Announced in: the 113th United States Congress
- Sponsored by: Rep. John Carter (R-TX)
- Number of co-sponsors: 0

Codification
- Acts affected: Homeland Security Act of 2002, National Flood Insurance Act of 1968, Robert T. Stafford Disaster Relief and Emergency Assistance Act, Federal Fire Prevention and Control Act of 1974, and others
- U.S.C. sections affected: 31 U.S.C. § 1105(a), 6 U.S.C. §§ 341–345, 6 U.S.C. § 121 et seq., 6 U.S.C. § 551(e)(1), 19 U.S.C. § 58c(f)(3), and others
- Agencies affected: United States Congress, United States Senate, United States House of Representatives, Government Accountability Office, Executive Office of the President, Office of Management and Budget, United States Department of Justice, Office of Personnel Management, General Services Administration, Central Intelligence Agency, Department of Homeland Security, United States Citizenship and Immigration Services, Department of Homeland Security Office of Inspector General, United States Coast Guard, United States Secret Service, U.S. Immigration and Customs Enforcement, Transportation Security Administration, U.S. Customs and Border Protection, Federal Law Enforcement Training Center, Federal Emergency Management Agency, Centers for Disease Control and Prevention, United States Department of Defense
- Appropriations: At least $48,646,185,000 with an additional unlimited amount

[H.R. 2217 Legislative history]
- Introduced in the House as H.R. 2217 by Rep. John Carter (R-TX) on May 29, 2013; Committee consideration by United States House Committee on Appropriations, United States Senate Committee on Appropriations; Passed the House on June 6, 2013 (Roll Call 211: 245-182)

The Department of Homeland Security Appropriations Act, 2014 (H.R. 2217) is an appropriations bill that was introduced into the United States House of Representatives during the 113th United States Congress. The bill would appropriate money to various government agencies (primarily, but not exclusively) related to the United States Department of Homeland Security. This funding would be used during fiscal year 2014, which ends September 30, 2014. The United States House Committee on Appropriations recommended "$38,993,000,000 in discretionary funding for the Department of Homeland Security (DHS) for fiscal year 2014, (which is) $34,885,000, or .09 percent, below the amount requested and $613,205,000, or 1.55 percent, below fiscal year 2013 enacted levels." The bill was later incorporated as Division-F of the Consolidated Appropriations Act, 2014 which was enacted in January 2014.

== Provisions/Elements of the bill ==
This summary is based largely on the summary provided by the Congressional Research Service, a public domain source.

The Department of Homeland Security Appropriations Act, 2014 (H.R. 2217) would make appropriations for the Department of Homeland Security (DHS) for FY2014. It is divided into five separate titles.

Title I is entitled "Departmental Management and Operations." It makes appropriations for: (1) the Office of the Secretary of Homeland Security and executive management, (2) the Office of the Under Secretary for Management, (3) the Office of the Chief Financial Officer, (4) the Office of the Chief Information Officer, (5) intelligence analysis and operations coordination activities, and (6) the Office of the Inspector General.

Title II is entitled "Security, Enforcement, and Investigations." It makes appropriations for: (1) U.S. Customs and Border Protection (CBP), including for border security fencing, infrastructure, and technology; (2) U.S. Immigration and Customs Enforcement (ICE), including to reimburse other federal agencies for the costs associated with the care, maintenance, and repatriation of smuggled aliens unlawfully present in the United States, to identify and remove from the United States aliens convicted of a crime once they are judged deportable, and for detention and removal operations; (3) the Transportation Security Administration (TSA), including for aviation security (including explosives detection systems), surface transportation security, screening programs of the Office of Transportation Threat Assessment and Credentialing, transportation security support and intelligence, and the Federal Air Marshals; (4) the Coast Guard, including funding derived from the Oil Spill Liability Trust Fund for prevention, removal, and enforcement related to oil discharges, funding for environmental compliance and restoration functions, and funding for the Coast Guard Reserve; and (5) the U.S. Secret Service.

Title II also would require the Border Patrol to maintain an active duty presence of not less than 21,370 full-time equivalent agents protecting U.S. borders in FY2014.

Title III is entitled "Protection, Preparedness, Response, and Recovery." It makes appropriations for FY2014 for: (1) the Office of the Under Secretary of Homeland Security for National Protection and Programs and the Offices of the Assistant Secretaries for the DHS National Protection and Programs Directorate, including for the Federal Protective Service and the Office of Biometric Identity Management; (2) the DHS Office of Health Affairs, including for BioWatch operations; and (3) the Federal Emergency Management Agency (FEMA), including for grants for state and local programs, firefighter assistance grants, emergency management performance grants, the United States Fire Administration, disaster relief, the flood hazard mapping and risk analysis program, the National Flood Insurance Fund, the predisaster mitigation grant program, and the emergency food and shelter program.

Title IV is entitled "Research and Development, Training, and Services." It makes appropriations for FY2014 for: (1) United States Citizenship and Immigration Services (CIS), including for the E-Verify program; (2) the Federal Law Enforcement Training Center; (3) the Office of the Under Secretary for Science and Technology, including for construction of the National Bio- and Agro-defense Facility; and (4) the Domestic Nuclear Detection Office.

Title V is entitled "General Provisions." It lists off a variety of rules, requirements, and limitations on how the money appropriated to the various agencies can or cannot use the funds.

- (Sec. 501) Sets forth limitations and prohibitions on the availability, use, reprogramming, or transfer of funds for specified programs and activities under this Act.
- (Sec. 513) Prohibits the use of funds available in this Act to amend the oath of allegiance required under the Immigration and Nationality Act (INA).
- (Sec. 522) Prohibits the use of funds by CIS to grant an immigration benefit unless the results of required background checks have been received and do not preclude granting the benefit.
- (Sec. 526) Prohibits the use of funds for CBP to prevent an individual from importing a prescription drug from Canada if: (1) such individual is not in the business of importing a prescription drug; and (2) such drug complies with specified provisions of the Federal Food, Drug, and Cosmetic Act and is not a controlled substance or a biological product. Makes this section applicable only to individuals transporting on their person a personal-use quantity of the prescription drug, not exceeding a 90-day supply.
- (Sec. 528) Prohibits the use of funds made available in this Act: (1) for planning, testing, piloting, or developing a national identification card; (2) to transfer, release, or assist in the transfer or release to or within the United States, its territories, or possessions, of Khalid Sheikh Mohammed or any other detainee who is not a U.S. citizen or a member of the U.S. Armed Forces, or who is or was held on or after June 24, 2009, at the U.S. Naval Station, Guantanamo Bay, Cuba, by the Department of Defense (DOD); or (3) to employ unauthorized aliens.
- (Sec. 537) Requires any company that collects or retains personal information directly from any individual who participates in TSA's Registered Traveler or successor program to safeguard and dispose of such information in accordance with specified requirements.
- (Sec. 539) Requires the TSA Administrator to: (1) submit to the House and Senate Appropriations Committees a report that either certifies that the requirement for screening all air cargo on passenger aircraft by the deadline has been met or includes a strategy to comply with such requirements, and (2) continue to submit such reports every 180 days until the Administrator has achieved screening of 100% of such air cargo.
- (Sec. 544) Provides that any sale or collocation of federally owned detention facilities shall not result in the maintenance of fewer than 34,000 ICE detention beds.
- (Sec. 545) Prohibits funds made available under this Act or any prior appropriations Act from being provided to the Association of Community Organizations for Reform Now (ACORN) or any of its affiliates, subsidiaries, or allied organizations.
- (Sec. 547) Requires the DHS Secretary to ensure enforcement of immigration laws.
- (Sec. 551) Prohibits funds made available under this Act from being used by a federal law enforcement officer to facilitate the transfer of an operable firearm to an individual if the officer knows or suspects that the individual is an agent of a drug cartel unless U.S. law enforcement personnel continuously monitor or control the firearm at all times.
- (Sec. 555) Prohibits the use of funds under this Act to pay for the travel to or attendance of more than 50 employees of a single component of DHS, who are stationed in the United States, at a single international conference unless the Secretary determines that such attendance is in the national interest and notifies the Senate and House Appropriations Committees within at least 10 days of that determination and its basis.
- (Sec. 558) Directs the Secretary to submit quarterly reports to the Inspector General regarding the costs and contracting procedures related to each conference or ceremony held by any departmental component or office in FY2014 for which the cost to the U.S. government was more than $20,000.
- (Sec. 561) Prohibits the use of funds under this Act to impose, or to conduct any study relating to the imposition of, a border crossing fee for pedestrians or passenger vehicles at land ports of entry along the southern or northern U.S. borders.
- (Sec. 563) Prohibits funds appropriated by this Act for ICE from: (1) being available to pay for an abortion, except where the mother's life would be endangered if the fetus were carried to term, or in the case of rape or incest; or (2) being used to require any person to perform, or facilitate the performance of, an abortion.
- (Sec. 566) Directs the Secretary to submit to Congress: (1) at the time that the President's budget proposal for FY2015 is submitted, a comprehensive report on purchase and usage of ammunition by DHS; and (2) beginning on April 15, 2014, and quarterly thereafter, a report regarding quantity of ammunition in inventory in, used by, and purchased by, DHS during the preceding calendar quarter.
- (Sec. 567) Rescinds specified funds from the Coast Guard for acquisition, construction, and improvements, and from unobligated balances made available in the Department of the Treasury Forfeiture Fund.
- (Sec. 571) Prohibits the use of funds to implement any change in the list of sharp objects prohibited from being carried by passengers as accessible property or on their person through passenger screening checkpoints or into airport sterile areas and the cabins of a passenger aircraft.
- (Sec. 572) Prohibits the use of funds to enter into a contract with an offeror for the purchase of an American flag that is certified as a foreign end product.
- (Sec. 573) Prohibits the use of funds to contract with any offeror who certifies that: (1) within the preceding three years, the offeror has been convicted of, or had a civil judgment rendered against it for, commission of fraud in connection with obtaining or performing a public contract, violation of antitrust statutes relating to the submission of offers, embezzlement, theft, forgery, bribery, tax evasion, or other specified offenses; (2) the offeror or its principals are presently indicted for, or otherwise criminally or civilly charged by a governmental entity with, commission of any of such offenses; or (3) within the preceding three years, the offeror has been notified of any delinquent federal taxes in an amount that exceeds $3,000 for which the liability remains unsatisfied.
- (Sec. 574) Prohibits the use of funds: (1) in contravention of the First, Second, or Fourth Amendments to the Constitution; and (2) for the purchase, operation, or maintenance of armed unmanned aerial vehicles.
- (Sec. 576) Prohibits the use of funds in contravention of: (1) INA provisions regarding the detention of criminal aliens; (2) provisions of the Illegal Immigration Reform and Immigrant Responsibility Act of 1996 that prohibit a government entity or official from prohibiting or restricting a government entity from sending to, or receiving from, ICE information regarding the citizenship or immigration status of any individual; (3) provisions governing federal air marshals; and (4) INA provisions regarding the performance of immigration officer functions by state officers and employees.
- (Sec. 580) Prohibits the use of funds: (1) to administer or enforce provisions regarding adjusted premium rates under the National Flood Insurance Act of 1968; (2) for entering into a new contract for purposes of purchasing ammunition before the date the required report on the usage and purchase of ammunition by DHS is submitted; (3) to enforce provisions regarding federal agency procurement and acquisition of alternative fuels under the Energy Independence and Security Act of 2007; (4) for CBP preclearance operations at Abu Dhabi International Airport in the United Arab Emirates, except for administration of a tax or tariff; or (5) by DHS to lease or purchase new light duty vehicles for any executive fleet or for an agency's fleet inventory, except in accordance with Presidential Memorandum--Federal Fleet Performance, dated May 24, 2011.
- (Sec. 585) Prohibits the use of funds in contravention of: (1) the Fifth and Fourteenth Amendments to the Constitution, (2) Title VI of the Civil Rights Act of 1964 (relating to nondiscrimination in federally assisted programs), (3) specified provisions of the Omnibus Crime Control and Safe Streets Act of 1968 relating to prohibition of discrimination, and (4) specified provisions of the Violent Crime and Law Enforcement Act of 1994 relating to unlawful police patterns or practices.
- (Sec. 586) Prohibits the use of specified funds for official reception and representational expenses under the DHS Secretary complies with requirements for full implementation of a biometric entry and exit data system under the Intelligence Reform and Terrorism Prevention Act of 2004.
- (Sec. 587) Makes appropriations to FEMA for the State Homeland Security Grant Program and makes offsetting reductions in appropriations for DHS's Office of the Chief Financial Officer.
- (Sec. 588) Prohibits the use of funds to finalize, implement, administer, or enforce specified documents, including: (1) a June 15, 2012 memorandum from the DHS Secretary pertaining to "Exercising Prosecutorial Discretion with Respect to Individuals Who came to the United States as Children"; and (2) the memorandum of December 21, 2012, from the Director of ICE pertaining to "Civil Immigration Enforcement: Guidance on the Use of Detainers in the Federal, State, Local, and Tribal Criminal Justice Systems."

== Procedural history ==
=== House ===
The Department of Homeland Security Appropriations Act, 2014 (H.R. 2217) was introduced on May 29, 2013, by the United States House Committee on Appropriations Chairman Rep. John Carter (R-TX). It was reported alongside House Report 113-91. This 184-page report includes an explanatory summary, minority views from several members, and a variety of charts comparing FY 2013 funding with the proposed FY 2014 funding. On June 3, 2013, the bill was placed on the Union Calendar, calendar 64. On June 5, 2013, the House resolved itself in the Committee of the Whole to debate the Department of Homeland Security Appropriations Act, 2014 with Rep. Phil Roe (R-TN) as the designated chairman. The Committee of the Whole debated the bill and various amendments until 12:30 am on June 6 before adjourning. On June 6, 2013, at 11:13 am, the bill passed in Roll Call 211 with a vote of 245–182.

=== Senate ===
The Department of Homeland Security Appropriations Act, 2014 was received in the United States Senate on June 7, 2013, and then referred to the United States Senate Committee on Appropriations.

=== Presidential response ===
On June 3, 2013, President of the United States Barack Obama and his Administration released a statement on H.R. 2217. The statement explains the President's reactions to specific aspects of the funding in the bill (or removed from it). The most important statement, however, is that "unless this bill passes the Congress in the context of an overall budget framework that supports our recovery and enables sufficient investments in education, infrastructure, innovation and national security for our economy to compete in the future, the President’s senior advisors would recommend that he veto H.R. 2217 and any other legislation that implements the House Republican Budget framework." Thus, the President has threatened to veto this bill unless certain requirements or concessions are met. The President also threatened to veto the Military Construction and Veterans Affairs, and Related Agencies Appropriations Act, 2014 on the same day. Despite this threat, the House passed the bill three days later.

== Debate and discussion ==
Media coverage. Organizations and people for or against.

== See also ==
- List of bills in the 113th United States Congress
- Appropriation bill – United States
