= Bipartisan Commission on Biodefense =

American biodefense organization

The Bipartisan Commission on Biodefense at the Atlantic Council, formerly known as the Blue Ribbon Study Panel on Biodefense, is an organization of former high-ranking government officials that analyzes US capabilities and capacity to defend against biological threats. According to the commission's mission statement, the organization was formed to "provide for a comprehensive assessment of the state of U.S. biodefense efforts, and to issue recommendations that will foster change."

The commission is supported by donor organizations. New Venture Fund serves as the commission's fiscal sponsor. Current donors include Open Philanthropy and Bavarian Nordic.

== Commissioners, staff, and ex officio members ==
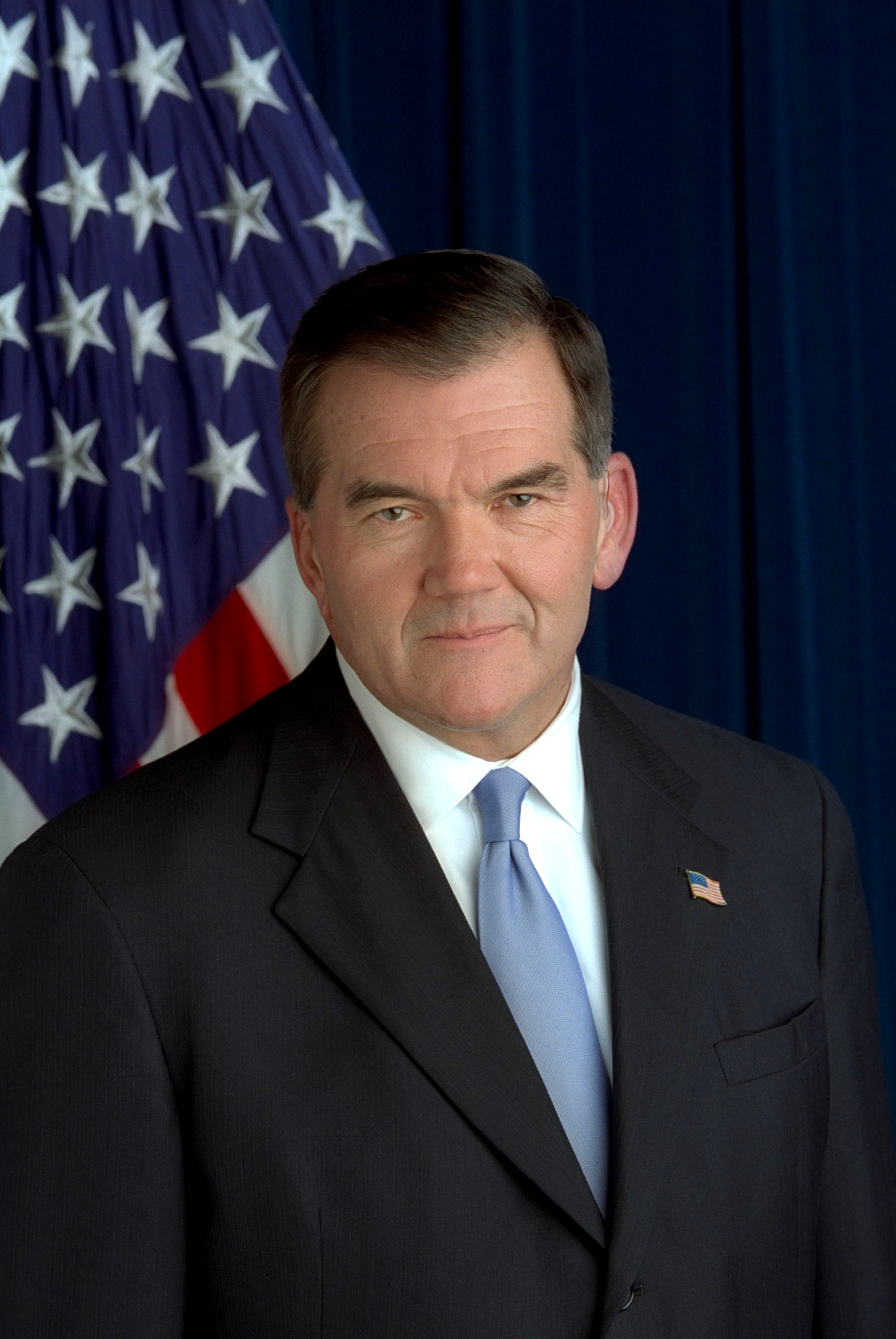
Governor Tom Ridge

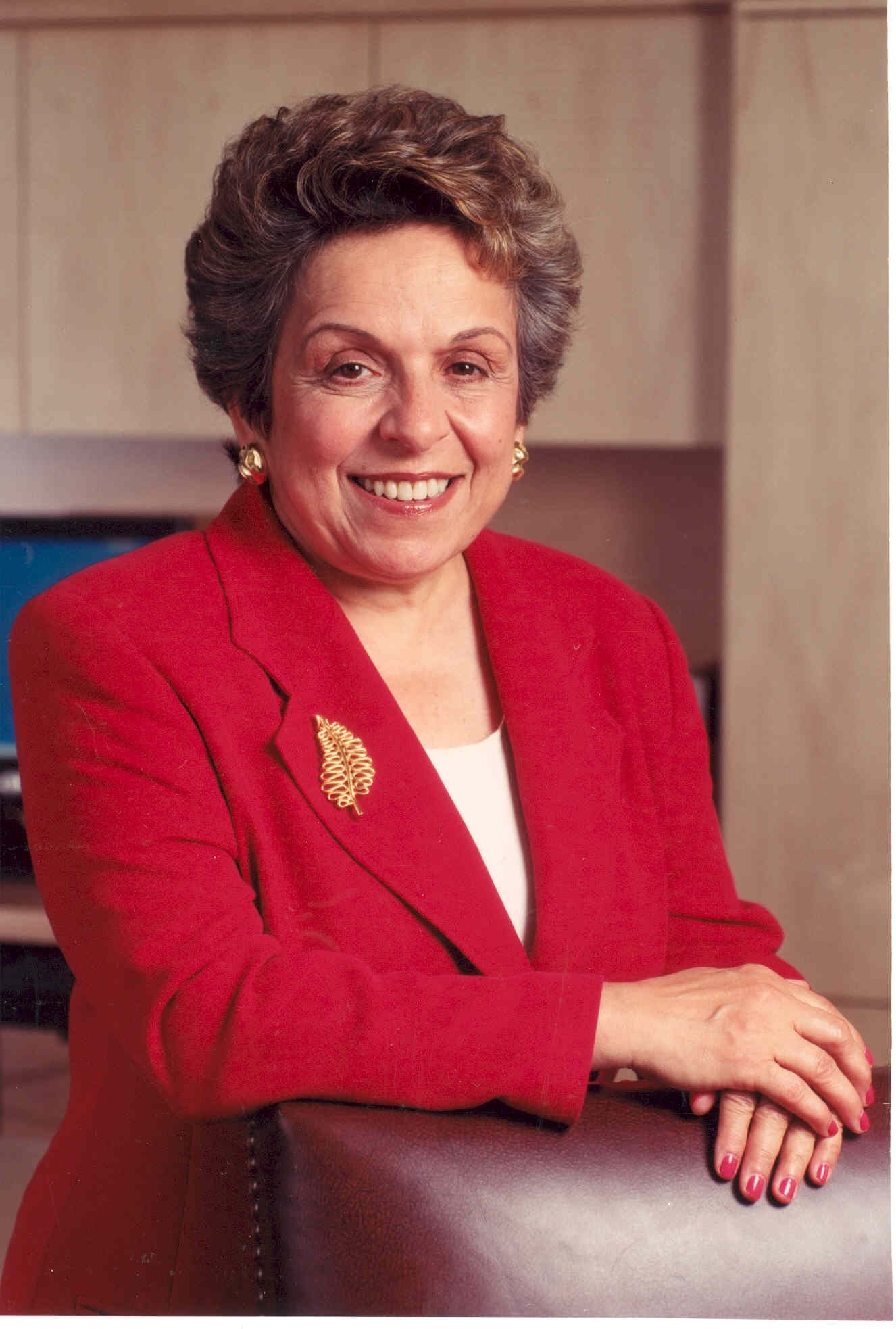
Secretary Donna Shalala

The Bipartisan Commission on Biodefense is co-chaired by former Secretary of Homeland Security and Governor Tom Ridge and former Secretary of Health and Human Services Donna Shalala. Former Senator Joe Lieberman co-chaired the Commission with Governor Ridge for ten years prior to his death in 2024.

Role	Name	Experience
Co-chair	Tom Ridge	Secretary of Homeland Security, Governor of Pennsylvania, United States Representative
Co-chair	Donna Shalala	Secretary of health and human services, United States Representative
Commissioner	Tom Daschle	United States Senator, Senate Majority Leader, and Senate Democratic Leader
Commissioner	Fred Upton	United States Representative, Chairman of the House Committee on Energy and Commerce
Commissioner	Anna Eshoo	United States Representative, At-Large Democratic Whip, House Committee on Energy and Commerce, Ranking Member, Subcommittee on Health
Commissioner	Jim Greenwood	United States Representative, chairman of the Subcommittee on Oversight and Investigation, House Committee on Energy and Commerce, Pennsylvania General Assembly member, Pennsylvania state senator
Commissioner	Susan Brooks	United States Representative
Commissioner	Margaret A. (Peggy) Hamburg	Commissioner of Food and Drugs, FDA
Commissioner	Ken Wainstein	Under Secretary of Intelligence and Analysis, Department of Homeland Security; Homeland Security Advisor to President George W. Bush
Commissioner	Raj Panjabi	Senior Partner at Flagship Pioneering, Senior Director and Special Assistant for Global Health Security and Biodefense, National Security Council, for President Joe Biden
Director	Asha M. George, DrPH	Subcommittee staff director and senior professional staff at the United States House Committee on Homeland Security, U.S. Army military intelligence officer and paratrooper
Associate Director	Robert Bradley	Professional Staff at the United States Senate Committee on Homeland Security and Governmental Affairs
Associate Director	John T. "JT" O'Brien, MS	Researcher, Future of Humanity Institute, Oxford University
Ex Officio Member	William Karesh, DVM	President of One Health Concepts, Executive Vice President for Health and Policy of EcoHealth Alliance, President of the World Organisation for Animal Health
Ex Officio Member	Rachel Levinson, MA	Executive director of national research initiatives at Arizona State University
Ex officio Member	Lewis "Scooter" Libby, JD	Distinguished Fellow, Foundation for Defense of Democracies; Senior Vice President at Hudson Institute; Assistant to Vice President Dick Cheney for National Security Affairs

== Background ==
Between 2001 and 2014, the U.S. spent around $80 billion on biodefense. Beginning in fall 2014, the Bipartisan Commission on Biodefense conducted meetings, interviews, and research. It studied the 2001 anthrax attacks and biodefense programs undertaken during the Clinton, Bush, and Obama Administrations, and continued with its examination of the activities undertaken during the Biden and Trump Administrations.

In October 2015, the commission released its recommendations to publicly and submitted them to Congress in the form of the report, A National Blueprint for Biodefense: Leadership and Major Reform Needed to Optimize Efforts. They concluded that the United States was not prepared to respond to a large scale biological event - naturally occurring, accidentally released, or intentionally introduced. As for the cause of the problem, the report said, "Simply put, the Nation does not afford the biological threat the same level of attention as it does other threats."

== A National Blueprint for Biodefense ==
The Bipartisan Commission on Biodefense conducted a year-long study of how the U.S. should address biological threats. The study covered human-generated (i.e., terrorism, warfare, accidents) and naturally occurring biological threats. The study culminated in a report to the public and Congress released on October 28, 2015.

The group's report was titled A National Blueprint for Biodefense. The report described many biological threats, including those posed by the Islamic State and Al Qaeda, as well as nation states, and "mishandling of lethal biological agents by the U.S. government," as reasons for making biodefense a high national priority. This report contained 33 recommendations and 87 specific action items associated with those recommendations.

The report proposed congressional oversight hearings to address the following issues:

- Major biological threats
- Animal disease reporting
- Biomedical Advanced Research and Development Authority
- National Biodefense Strategy
- Biosurveillance
- Budgeting for biodefense
- Cyber vulnerabilities to the life sciences industry
- Food supply protection and response
- Global health security and response
- Medical countermeasures (MCM) innovation
- Military-civilian biodefense collaboration
- Origin of active pharmaceutical ingredients (API)
- PHEMCE coordination of MCM efforts
- Select Agent Program
- Vulnerable populations

== Major problems identified ==
The international symbol for biological hazard.

In the Blueprint for Biodefense report, the commission said that almost no urgency within the federal government for dealing with the risk of a biological event existed.

The report stated that the government does not appear to take events related to biodefense seriously enough. One member stated, "The tragic saga of the death of Thomas Eric Duncan from Ebola Virus Disease (EVD) serves as a perfect demonstration of the shambolic state of biodefense in the United States in late 2014." Another estimated that the consequences of inaction on Commission recommendations would be that the report would serve as a "guidebook for placing blame."

The commission also noted that the federal government had also failed to update its practices and procedures as they relate to biological threats. For example, there is a system within the National Institutes of Health and Food and Drug Administration that would fast-track the approval of medical countermeasures in the event of a biological attack. However, during a hearing with the Senate Committee on Homeland Security and Governmental Affairs, Governor Tom Ridge stated that the fast-track process is obsolete. Page 52 of the report reads, "A systemic, risk averse culture has emerged that is stifling innovation. If this continues to evolve, progress on biodefense objectives will be curtained and the still nascent biodefence industry will have little incentive to participate."

Another example is the practice of stockpiling vaccines against a biological agent. This practice is considered obsolete by some. Nation states and terrorist organizations are already able to "merge the toxic attributes of more than one agent." To replace vaccine stockpiles, the Panel recommended a "vaccines-on-demand approach."

=== Need to strengthen White House Leadership of the national biodefense enterprise ===
One of the commission's major recommendations was to place responsibility for biodefense leadership into the hands of the Office of the Vice President of the United States. By doing so, biodefense would have "the ear of the president and the ability to coordinate budgets and plans across agencies." In such a scenario, the White House Biodefense Coordination Council would execute the day-to-day work, Senator Lieberman said during testimony in front of the House Homeland Security Committee. By making the vice president responsible for biodefense, it would "transcend the bureaucratic and budgetary rivalries of various agencies in order to create an effective platform for dealing with biological attacks."

Among the eleven new recommendations found in Biodefense in Crisis (the commission's second status report describing federal implementation of its recommendations from A National Blueprint for Biodefense), the commission advises the president to establish a dedicated deputy national security advisor for biodefense, overseen by the vice president and supported by NSC staff. The commission clearly notes that one federal department cannot tell other departments and agencies what to do, especially in a critical area of responsibility like biodefense. A dedicated higher-level leader in the White House without responsibilities for multiple weapons of mass destruction, terrorist avenues, and national disasters is crucial.

=== Need for a national biodefense strategy ===
Dr. George told Homeland Preparedness News that in order for the government's defense against a biological attack to be sufficient, a new comprehensive program needs to be developed. The programs and activities under a new approach would need to be "coordinated, collaborative and innovative." The report recommends that all types of biological threats should be addressed by a single comprehensive strategy. By different types, they meant biological warfare, bioterrorism, naturally occurring deadly disease, and accidental release.

In accordance with the commission's third recommendation from A National Blueprint for Biodefense, on September 18, 2018, President Donald Trump released the 2018 National Biodefense Strategy and signed National Security Presidential Memorandum 14 to direct the federal government to execute this strategy. Together, they sought to improve the federal government's readiness and capability to respond to human-generated, naturally occurring, and accidentally released biological threats to the Nation. The Strategy was mandated by Congress and has five extensively detailed goals. It established a new cabinet-level Biodefense Steering Committee chaired by the scretary of health and human services. National Security Advisor John Bolton said, "The Biodefense Steering Committee will monitor and coordinate implementation of the National Biodefense Strategy across 15 federal agencies and the Intelligence Community." The Bipartisan Commission on Biodefense commended the Trump Administration for creating the strategy in accordance with the commission's third recommendation in its National Blueprint for Biodefense.

=== Need for a biological attribution apparatus ===
The commission held a public meeting on October 3, 2017 about the biological attribution of crime, terrorism, and warfare, and continues to pursue this important topic. The continuing debate and uncertainty surrounding the origins of COVID-19 demonstrate the need for biological attribution. Biological attribution refers to the process of determining who and what was responsible for a biological attack. Perpetrators could be criminals, terrorists, or state actors. During this meeting, the commission learned about the federal government's existing capabilities to determine the sources and characteristics of deadly pathogens. The commission has taken a particular interest in the National Bioforensics Analysis Center (NBFAC). In fiscal year 2013, the NBFAC supported more than 45 investigations of potential biological crimes. Previously run by the Department of Homeland Security (DHS), the commission recommended that the Federal Bureau of Investigation (FBI) assume management of the NBFAC, as all specimens going into the facility come from the FBI. In 2018, DHS and the FBI signed a memorandum of agreement that transferred NBFAC management to the FBI.

=== Need to budget for biodefense ===
Myriad federal departments and agencies are responsible for defending against these threats. Referring to their activities as a federal biodefense enterprise suggests a coordinated interagency endeavor unified in achieving common goals, but this is not the reality that exists currently. America is more vulnerable today than it should be to a biological crisis of any scale.

— Bipartisan Commission on Biodefense, February 2018 report

In its February 2018 report, Budget Reform for Biodefense: Integrated Budget Needed to Increase Return on Investment, the commission noted increasing threats to the United States and its interests overseas, and determined that the U.S. government can no longer wait to commit sufficient federal funds to biodefense. Waiting is not in the best interest of the health of Americans nor the country's national security. The commission released its report to the public and Congress in 2018.

One of the key budgeting issues identified by the commission is that all federal departments and many federal agencies have some biodefense responsibilities. Despite this multiplicity, there is not enough coordination. Lieberman said the Office of Management and Budget (OMB) does not know how much the federal government spends on biodefense because "the sad fact is, more than two dozen agencies are working in silos across biodefense; that increases our vulnerabilities. Once we have a strategy and match that strategy with budget reforms...that's the beginning of a much more effective biodefense national strategy." Economic impacts of a catastrophic outbreak could reach $1 trillion, Lieberman noted.

The report recommends that the OMB each year submit "an integrated budget request to Congress that outlines federal-wide biodefense spending, and how it is tied to mission objectives." In 2019, congressional Appropriations directed OMB to conduct a biodefense budget cross-cut that would inform the budget request, in accordance with one of the commission's recommendations. While the report also asks Congress to create a bipartisan, bicameral Biodefense Working Group to come up with budgeting solutions, Congress has yet to establish such a Group. The House of Representatives, however, has established a Biodefense Caucus.

=== Need to prepare for large-scale biological events ===
Commissioners and experts agreed during a public commission meeting held in Miami, Florida, in January 2018 that in order to respond effectively during a large-scale biological event due to a terrorist attack or natural disaster, the public and private sectors need to coordinate. The commission also noted that obstacles exist that highlight the Nation's vulnerabilities to such an event. The commission concluded that a comprehensive public health system that is able to respond before a biological disaster strikes is critical.

In an op-ed in the Miami Herald on January 15, 2018, former secretary of health and human services Donna Shalala said that during a large biological event, "I know that the federal government would move resources to affected areas throughout the United States. But those resources are already too few, and the federal government does not respond quickly to multiple locations in distress." Shalala's comments were prescient and perfectly described the federal response to the COVID-19 pandemic as it spread to the United States in 2020.

=== Need for a stratified national biodefense hospital system ===
A "stratified biodefense hospital system would provide the United States with a protective shield in the event the country experiences a manmade or natural biological catastrophe," speakers told members of the Bipartisan Commission on Biodefense in a January 2018 public meeting, according to Homeland Preparedness News. The public hearing occurred during the same week that the Senate began holding hearings on the Pandemic and All-Hazards Preparedness Act (PAHPA), which was due for reauthorization in September 2018. Information sharing across state, local, tribal, and territorial (SLTT) governments was another large theme during the public meeting. In its December 2016 Biodefense Indicators report, the commission recommended that the federal government "redouble its efforts to share information with SLTT governments" and described various action items to do so.

=== Need for a One Health approach to biodefense ===
The report also suggested that the government merge duplicate processes by including all biological threats, not just those from terrorism, into a national strategy. For example, the "One Health approach" is one recommendation made by the commission that would merge strategies for dealing with human, animal, and plant health biodefense programs.

=== Need to defend food and agriculture against biological threats ===
In December 2018, President Trump signed the Agricultural Improvement Act of 2018 (H.R. 2), also known as The Farm Bill. The legislation addressed Commission recommendations to defend U.S. food and agriculture. The new law creates a National Animal Disease Preparedness and Response Program and a National Animal Vaccine and Veterinary Countermeasures Bank, and increases federal funding to stockpile medical countermeasures for animals.

=== Need to address science and technology for biodefense ===
The Bipartisan Commission on Biodefense also called for the new Innovation Funds at the National Institutes of Health, and for ten percent of those funds to be dedicated to building technology that would allow multiple antigens in a countermeasure to be delivered from a single platform. Similarly, the commission called for ten percent of funds from the Biomedical Advanced Research and Development Authority (BARDA) for the same purpose.

== Recommendations from A National Blueprint for Biodefense ==
The National Blueprint for Biodefense laid out 33 recommendations and 87 associated action items. The primary actions the U.S. government should take, according to the commission's report, are the following:

Number	Recommendation	Specific action
1	Institutionalize biodefense in the Office of the Vice President of the United States	Empower the vice president with jurisdiction and authority over biodefense responsibilities.
2	Establish a Biodefense Coordination Council at the White House, led by the vice president	The vice president should lead the primary designees and the members as a coalition that will prioritize needed activities, designate responsibilities, and ensure accountability.
3	Develop, implement, and update a comprehensive national biodefense strategy	The vice president should develop a comprehensive national biodefense strategy and implementation plan.
4	Unify biodefense budgeting	Congress should mandate the development of a unified budget that defines how the entire biodefense enterprise is funded.
5	Determine and establish a clear congressional agenda to ensure national biodefense	At the start of each congressional session, Senate and House leadership should direct each committee with biodefense jurisdiction to convene for an in-depth classified biological threat briefing.
6	Improve management of the biological intelligence enterprise	The director of national nntelligence should address the biological threat in the same way that other issues have been handled that cut across multiple intelligence agencies. This includes creating a national intelligence manager for biological threats, making the biological weapons programs a discrete intelligence topic, addressing bystanders, and distributing assessments.
7	Integrate animal health and One Health approaches into biodefense strategies	The White House should lead all relevant agencies to a new level of understanding, planning, and operating with respect to biodefense that includes an animal health and, more broadly, a One Health mindset. The executive branch should also develop a nationally notifiable animal disease system and prioritize emerging as well as reemerging infectious diseases.
8	Prioritize and align investments in medical countermeasures among all federal stakeholders	The vice president should ensure that Public Health Emergency Medical Countermeasures Enterprise (PHEMCE) priorities guide NIH biodefense research investments. The vice president should also ensure funding allocations that address biological agents are met and require a biodefense spending plan from the National Institute of Allergy and Infectious Diseases.
9	Better support and informed decisions based on biological attribution	The vice president should direct the secretary of state, secretary of defense, secretary of homeland security, the attorney general, and the DNI to establish and formalize this apparatus. The FBI should also take charge of the national Bioforensics Analysis Center.
10	Establish a national environmental decontamination and remediation capacity	The vice president should ensure the Federal Emergency Management Agency is included in interagency efforts to determine policy on biological attacks. Congress should place the EPA in charge of environmental decontamination and remediation efforts after accidental releases and biological attacks. And both the vice president and Congress should delegate studies of those exposed to disease-causing agents.
11	Implement an integrated national biosurveillance capability	The plan must identify information required by decision makers (federal, state, local, territorial, tribal, private sector) to manage a biological event.
12	Empower non-federal entities to become equal biosurveillance partners	The secretary of homeland security should create an interagency biosurveillance planning committee the nexus for active collaboration with non-federal government and non-governmental partners.
13	Optimize the National Biosurveillance Integration System (NBIS)	The National Security Council should immediately examine NBIS to determine whether expenditures have yielded sufficient amounts of useful information to decision makers beyond the Department of Homeland Security. The NSC should also convene data owners and other stakeholders to evaluate incentive options and determine which are most viable for data and information sharing.
14	Improve surveillance of and planning for animal and zoonotic outbreaks	Congress should increase opportunities for animal health data collection and optimize funding for the National Animal Health Laboratory Network. The CDC and FEMA should then develop guidance for states, localities, territories, and tribes to handle companion animal infections in the event of a major zoonotic disease outbreak.
15	Provide emergency service providers with the resources they need to keep themselves and their families safe	The secretary of homeland security must ensure that emergency service providers have access to anthrax vaccines and extend the program to meet other threats. The CDC, FDA and ASPR should preposition medkits with emergency service providers and their families. And the secretary of health and human services should establish reasonable personal protective equipment guidelines and requirements in advance of a biological event.
16	Redouble efforts to share information with state, local, territorial, and tribal partners	The government should strengthen the Joint Counterterrorism Assessment Team, local police intelligence units and provide technical assistance to fusion centers to provide biological information and intelligence.
17	Fund the Public Health Emergency Preparedness cooperative agreement at no less than authorized levels	Congress should appropriate the Public Health Emergency Preparedness funding to authorized levels or the president's request, whichever is higher.
18	Establish and utilize a standard process to develop and issue clinical infection control guidance for biological events	Congress should standardize the development of clinical infection control guidelines before biological events occur. The secretary of health and human services and the Secretary of Labor should also Institute a process for obtaining and incorporating feedback regarding clinical infection control guidelines during biological events as well as require training based on these guidelines.
19	Minimize redirection of Hospital Preparedness Program (HPP) funds	Congress should amend the Public Health Service Act to require that no less than 97 percent of appropriated HPP funds go directly to HPP grantees. Congress should also regularly assess the program.
20	Provide the financial incentives hospitals need to prepare for biological events	The government should adopt a disaster preparedness portfolio that includes the Conditions of Participation, Interpretive Guidance, measures development for inclusion within value-based purchasing, and innovation projects. Congress should also link Centers for Medicare and Medicaid Services incentives and reimbursement to new accreditation standards.
21	Establish a biodefense hospital system	The secretary of health and human services should establish a stratified system of hospitals with increasing levels of capability to treat patients affected by bioterrorism and other events involving highly pathogenic infectious diseases. The Administrator of Centers for Medicare and Medicaid Services should develop new standards to accredit hospitals and provide funding accordingly.
22	Develop and implement a Medical Countermeasure (MCM) Response Framework	Together with non-federal partners, the ASPR, the director of the CDC, and the Administrator of FEMA should identify requirements and capacities needed to achieve successful distribution and dispensing of MCM from the Strategic National Stockpile as well as from local caches.
23	Allow for forward deployment of Strategic National Stockpile assets	The director of the CDC should determine the necessary assessment, logistical, and funding requirements to forward deploy Strategic National Stockpile assets.
24	Harden pathogen and advanced biotechnology information from cyber attacks	The vice president should develop and implement a security strategy for stored pathogen data and cyber-threat information-sharing mechanisms for the pathogen and advanced biotechnology communities. In turn, Federal departments and agencies should include federally supported pathogen research projects in the revised procurement model under development.
25	Renew U.S. leadership of the Biological and Toxin Weapons Convention (BWC)	The government should continue to strengthen implementation of the BWC where U.S. support is unequivocal, set U.S. goals for the BWC and determine the conditions necessary to achieve them, develop three actionable recommendations for BWC verification, and establish better biological weapons sentencing guidelines in statute.
26	Implement military-civilian collaboration for biodefense	The government should conduct a review of military-civilian collaborative efforts, mandate military-civilian collaboration on biodefense (including research regarding force protection), clarify parameters for military support to civilian authorities in response to a domestic biological attack, and update and implement military biodefense doctrine.
27	Prioritize innovation over incrementalism in medical countermeasure development	The government should prioritize innovation and funding for medical countermeasures at agencies with biodefense responsibilities, identify at least five promising novel technologies that could ultimately be applied to MCM development for material threats, revolutionize development of medical countermeasures for emerging infectious diseases with pandemic potential, and establish an antigen bank.
28	Fully prioritize, fund, and incentivize the medical countermeasure enterprise	The government should fund the medical countermeasure enterprise to no less than authorized levels, re-establish multi-year biodefense funding for medical countermeasure procurement, address prioritization and funding for influenza preparedness, and improve the plan for incentivizing the private sector and academia.
29	Reform Biomedical Advanced Research and Development Authority contracting	Contracting authority should be the exclusive responsibility of the Biomedical Advanced Research and Development Authority (BARDA). In addition, BARDA should prioritize the use of OTA and consider any other appropriate flexible contracting authorities for BioShield. Congress should then eliminate the Office of Management and Budget review of BioShield procurements.
30	Incentivize development of rapid point-of-care diagnostics	The director of BARDA should determine the suite of rapid diagnostics that are needed for biological agents determined to be material threats and emerging infectious diseases.
31	Develop a 21st Century-worthy environmental detection system	Congress, through its appropriations to DHS and DOD, should fund an advanced environmental detection system capable of rapid agent characterization and confirmation. The secretary of homeland security should also replace BioWatch Generation 1 and 2 detectors within five years.
32	Review and overhaul the Select Agent Program	Congress should direct the National Science Advisory Board for Biosecurity to undertake a systematic, evidence-based assessment and overhaul of the Select Agent Program.
33	Lead the way toward establishing a functional and agile global public health response apparatus	The Secretary of State should convene human and animal health leaders from throughout the world to evaluate current mechanisms and develop a strategy and implementation plan for global public health response.

== Status of federal implementation of the commission's recommendations ==
On the anniversary of the arrival of COVID-19 in the United States, the commission released a report in March 2021 describing the status of federal implementation of recommendations from A National Blueprint for Biodefense. In this report, Biodefense in Crisis: Immediate Action Needed to Address National Vulnerabilities, the commission noted that as of January 2021 and out of its 87 recommended action items, the federal government had completed 3, took some action to address 54, no action on 24, and emergency or crisis actions (that may or may not result in permanent change) on 6 in response to the COVID-19 pandemic.

This new analysis from the Bipartisan Commission on Biodefense reveals that the United States remains at catastrophic biological risk. The commission urges the administration and Congress to take more actions now to avoid another pandemic or biological attack. The report closely examines the extent of progress that has been made since the commission released its seminal National Blueprint for Biodefense in 2015. Despite warnings from public health professionals, experts, and the commission, the country was caught unprepared for the COVID-19 pandemic. The Nation remains dangerously vulnerable to biological threats, despite some gains in preparedness and response.

“The COVID-19 pandemic was predictable,” said commission co-chair, former senator Joe Lieberman. “That is what our Commission learned from the experts we have consulted since we began operations in 2014. This global crisis resulted from a foreseeable combination of mutations, lack of immunity, poor preparedness, limited surveillance, and failure to learn from past pandemics. When our Commission released its National Blueprint for Biodefense in 2015, we concluded that our recommendations could and should be implemented by the Executive and Legislative Branches within five years. However, out of our 87 recommended action items, the government has completed just 3, took some action to address 54, no action on 24, and emergency or crisis actions on 6 in response to the COVID-19 pandemic. We are still more vulnerable to the next pandemic than we should be.”

“While the current spotlight on COVID-19 is necessary and urgent, it would be a costly mistake to focus solely on this pandemic to the exclusion of all other biological threats,” said commission co-chair, former secretary of homeland security Tom Ridge. “Nation-states such as China, Iran, North Korea, and Russia continue to invest heavily in advancing biotechnology and could produce biological agents and weapons. Terrorist organizations also remain interested in learning how to attack enemies with biological agents. National biodefense must begin and end with strong national leadership. The efforts of all federal departments and agencies with responsibilities for biodefense need to be coordinated, and they must be held accountable, by the White House.”

Among the eleven new recommendations in the report, the commission advises the president to establish a dedicated deputy national security advisor for biodefense, overseen by the vice president and supported by NSC staff. The commission clearly notes that one federal department cannot tell other departments and agencies what to do, especially in a critical area of responsibility like biodefense. A dedicated higher-level leader in the White House without responsibilities for multiple weapons of mass destruction, terrorist avenues, and national disasters is crucial.

The commission also continues to recommend eliminating the ineffective BioWatch program. Current BioWatch technology performs poorly and is far from the deterrence mechanism it was originally intended to be. It uses limited, decades-old collection equipment that only provides data hours or days after a biological event. Congressional appropriators should deny further funding to BioWatch activities until proven replacement technology is identified and confirmed to meet the needs of the Biodetection 2021 acquisition program.

== Other reports and publications ==
Since the release of its National Blueprint for Biodefense, the commission has released 14 other reports: Biodefense Indicators: One Year Later, Events Outpacing Federal Efforts to Defend the Nation (December 2016); Defense of Animal Agriculture (October 2017); Budget Reform for Biodefense: Integrated Budget Needed to Increase Return on Investment (2018); Holding The Line On Biodefense: State, Local, Tribal, and Territorial Reinforcements Needed (October 2018); Diagnostics for Biodefense - Flying Blind with No Plan to Land (November 2020); The Apollo Program for Biodefense: Winning the Race Against Biological Threats (2021); Biodefense in Crisis: Immediate Action Needed to Address National Vulnerabilities (2021), Insidious Scourge: Critical Infrastructure at Biological Risk (2021), Saving Sisyphus: Advanced Biodetection for the 21st Century, The Athena Agenda: Advancing the Apollo Program for Biodefense (April 2022), Boots on the Ground: Land Grant Universities in the Fight Against Threats to Food and Agriculture (May 2022), Box the Pox: Reducing the Risk of Smallpox and Other Orthopox Viruses (February 2024), The National Blueprint for Biodefense: Immediate Action Needed to Defend Against Biological Threats (April 2024) and its appendix, Proposed Congressional Hearings on the Recommendations of the 2024 National Blueprint for Biodefense: We are Still Dangerously Unprepared (May 2024), Battle Rattle: Fast Movers for Military Biodefense (May 2025), and Promote the Antidote: Reducing the Risk from Toxins (May 2026). The Commission also made artificial intelligence the 16th technology priority in its Apollo Program for Biodefense.

In early 2019, author Max Brooks partnered with the commission to author and publish a graphic novel called GERM WARFARE: A Very Graphic History. Brooks is the author of World War Z and is a non-resident fellow at the Modern War Institute at West Point and at the Scowcroft Center for Strategy and Security at the Atlantic Council. The novel "depicts previous biological warfare events, the possibilities for the future, and the continued need for public health security."

Previously, the commission teamed up with the Alliance for Biosecurity, and Trust for America's Health to conduct a survey of Americans' thoughts about biosecurity. According to the Alliance, Americans are concerned about biological threats.

== Congressional Hearings ==
The commission's bipartisan activities include meetings, research, issuing reports, meeting with officials at the White House and in every Administration, and testifying before Congress.

Assessing the State of Our Nation's Biodefense: Hearing before the Committee on Homeland Security and Governmental Affairs, U.S. Senate, 114th Congress, 2015

Defending Against Bioterrorism: How Vulnerable is America?: Hearing before the Committee on Homeland Security, U.S. House of Representatives, 114th Congress, 2015

Outside Views on Biodefense for the Department of Defense: Hearing before the Subcommittee on Emerging Threats and Capabilities, Committee on Armed Services, U.S. House of Representatives, 114th Congress, 2016

Outbreaks, Attacks, and Accidents: Combating Biological Threats: Hearing before the Subcommittee on Oversight and Investigations, Committee on Energy and Commerce, U.S. House of Representatives, 114th Congress, 2016

Safeguarding American Agriculture in a Globalized World: Hearing before the Committee on Agriculture, Nutrition, and Forestry, U.S. Senate, 115th Congress, 2017

U.S. Biodefense, Preparedness, and Implications of Antimicrobial Resistance for National Security: Hearing before the Subcommittee on National Security, Committee on Oversight and Reform, U.S. House of Representatives, 116^{th} Congress, 2019

Defending the Homeland from Bioterrorism: Are We Prepared?: Hearing before the Subcommittee on Emergency Preparedness, Response, and Recovery, Committee on Homeland Security, U.S. House of Representatives, 116^{th} Congress, 2019

Are We Prepared? Protecting the U.S. from Global Pandemics: Hearing Roundtable before the Committee on Homeland Security and Governmental Affairs, U.S. Senate, 116^{th} Congress, 2020

Addressing the Gaps in America’s Biosecurity Preparedness: Hearing before the Committee on Homeland Security and Governmental Affairs, U.S. Senate, 117^{th} Congress, 2022

Challenges and Opportunities to Investigating the Origins of Pandemics and Other Biological Events: Hearing before the Subcommittee on Oversight and Investigations, Committee on Energy and Commerce, U.S. House of Representatives, 118^{th} Congress, 2023

Surveying the Threat of Agroterrorism: Perspectives on Food, Agriculture, and Veterinary Defense: Hearing before the Subcommittee on Emergency Management and Technology, Committee on Homeland Security, U.S. House of Representatives, 119^{th} Congress, 2025

== Grants ==
In September 2016, the Open Philanthropy Project gave the commission a $1.3 million grant in support of the panel's influential leadership role in the evaluation of the nation's biodefense systems. Governor Tom Ridge said, "It is troubling that we still do not have a comprehensive approach to preparing for and responding to biological events. That is why this grant from Open Philanthropy is so critical. It will allow us to push forward the recommendations detailed in our National Blueprint and seek to put them into action."

In February 2018, the Open Philanthropy Project gave the commission a grant for $2.5 million to advance biodefense leadership and reduce catastrophic biological risk. “Estimates show that as many as 100 million people died in 1918 from pandemic influenza,” Senator Lieberman said. “That was before we were traveling as often as we do today, and well before commerce became globalized. Since then, the world has gotten smaller, but the threat has not. Far more needs to be done to prepare for another catastrophic biological event – whether manmade or from nature. With this in mind, the support we receive today from Open Philanthropy will allow us to further advance the recommendations the Panel identified in our National Blueprint for Biodefense and subsequent reports. We thank Open Philanthropy for their leadership and support on this critical issue.”

On March 16, 2020, the Open Philanthropy Project gave the commission a grant for $2.6 million to help defend America against biological threats. About the timing of the grant, Governor Ridge noted that it, "...comes in the midst of our national response to novel coronavirus and other highly pathogenic diseases, the development of biological weapons by other nation-states, and the ongoing threat of bioterrorism." Added Senator Lieberman, "The biological threats to our Nation remain all too real."

On August 25, 2022, the Open Philanthropy Project awarded the commission a grant for $5.2 million to strengthen efforts to improve preparation for biological incidents, ranging from pandemics and zoonotic diseases to biological terrorism and warfare. “The support we receive from Open Philanthropy is absolutely critical in our ability to continue working with the Administration and Congress to implement our recommendations,” said former Pennsylvania Gov. Tom Ridge, first secretary of homeland security and co-chair of the Bipartisan Commission on Biodefense. “The world can no longer consider a devastating biological event like the COVID-19 pandemic to be a rare, once-in-a-lifetime occurrence. Naturally occurring biological threats will become more deadly and transmissible than we see now with COVID-19. Increasing air travel, mass market food production, climate changes, urbanization, and increasing human-wildlife interactions only add to the growing risk and frequency of natural infectious diseases.” “The biological threats to our Nation remain all too real,” added former U.S. Sen. Joe Lieberman, co-chair of the Bipartisan Commission on Biodefense. “Our nation and the world are dealing with natural, accidental, and intentional biological threats simultaneously. Our Commission has made tremendous progress in getting recommendations in our initial Blueprint and subsequent Commission reports taken up by the Administration and Congress. We thank Open Philanthropy for their generosity and vision, which will allow this critical work to continue.”

In January 2024, the Open Philanthropy Project awarded the commission a grant for $4.6 million to continue its work to provide for a comprehensive assessment of the state of U.S. biodefense efforts, and to issue recommendations that will foster change.

The commission has also received grants from Smith Richardson Foundation and NTI, and unrestricted donations from a number of pharmaceutical and biotech companies, and academic institutions.

== See also ==
- 9/11 Commission
- Biological hazard
- Biological warfare
- Bioterrorism
- Pandemic influenza
- Terrorism
- United States biological defense program
