= Al Udeid Air Base =

Military facility southwest of Doha, Qatar

Al-Udeid Air Base
- قاعدة العديد الجوية
- Near Doha, Al Rayyan in Qatar
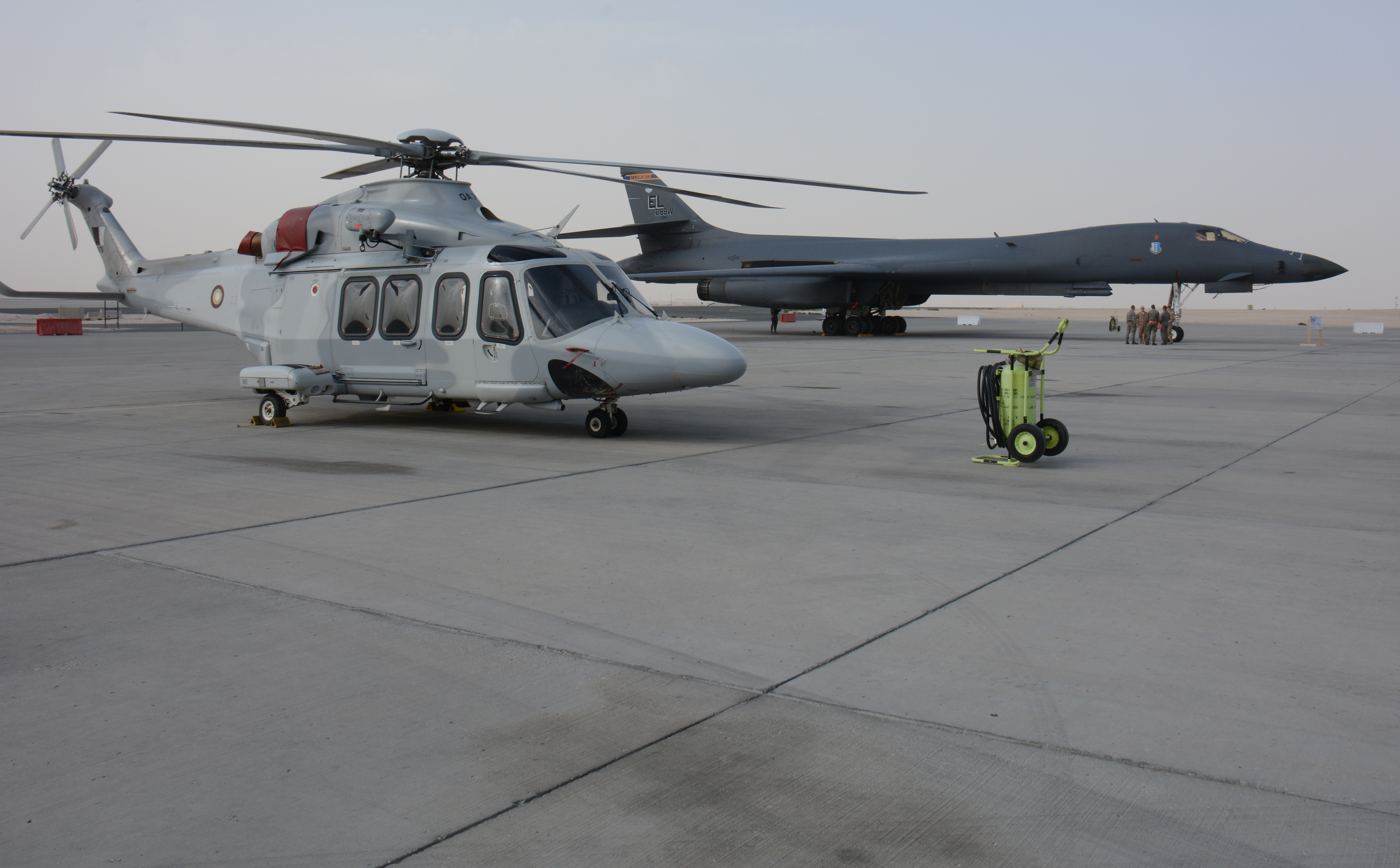
- A Qatar Emiri Air Force AW139 and a US Air Force B-1B Lancer on the flight-line at Al Udeid Air Base, 2016.

- Emblem of the Qatar Emiri Air Force

Site information
- Type: Qatar Emiri Air Force base
- Owner: Qatar Armed Forces
- Operator: Qatar Emiri Air Force; United States Air Force; Royal Air Force
- Condition: Operational

Location
- Location in Qatar Al-Udeid AB (Asia)
- Coordinates: 25°07′07″N 51°19′07″E
- Area: 12 square miles

Site history
- Built: 1996
- In use: 1996 – present

Garrison information
- Garrison: Transport Wing and 3rd Rotary Wing (Qatar Emiri Air Force); 379th Air Expeditionary Wing (US Air Force); No. 83 Expeditionary Air Group (Royal Air Force)

Airfield information
- Identifiers: IATA: XJD, ICAO: OTBH
- Elevation: 40 metres (131 ft) AMSL
Runways
Direction	Length and surface
16L/34R	3,750 metres (12,303 ft) Asphalt
16R/34L	3,750 metres (12,303 ft)
- Source: World Aero Data and Google Maps

Al Udeid Air Base (Arabic: قاعدة العديد الجوية; also known as Abu Nakhlah Airport (مطار أبو نخلة)) is one of two military bases to the southwest of Doha, Qatar, in the municipality of Al Rayyan. It is the largest US military base in the Middle East, hosting approximately 10,000 military personnel as of 2026.

It houses the Qatar Emiri Air Force, United States Air Force (USAF), United Kingdom Royal Air Force (RAF), and other foreign forces. It is host to a forward headquarters of U.S. Central Command, headquarters of the USAF Central Command, No. 83 Expeditionary Air Group RAF, and the 379th Air Expeditionary Wing of the USAF.

In June 2017, the base hosted over 11,000 U.S. and Coalition anti-ISIL coalition forces and over 100 operational aircraft.

== History ==
=== United States Air Force ===
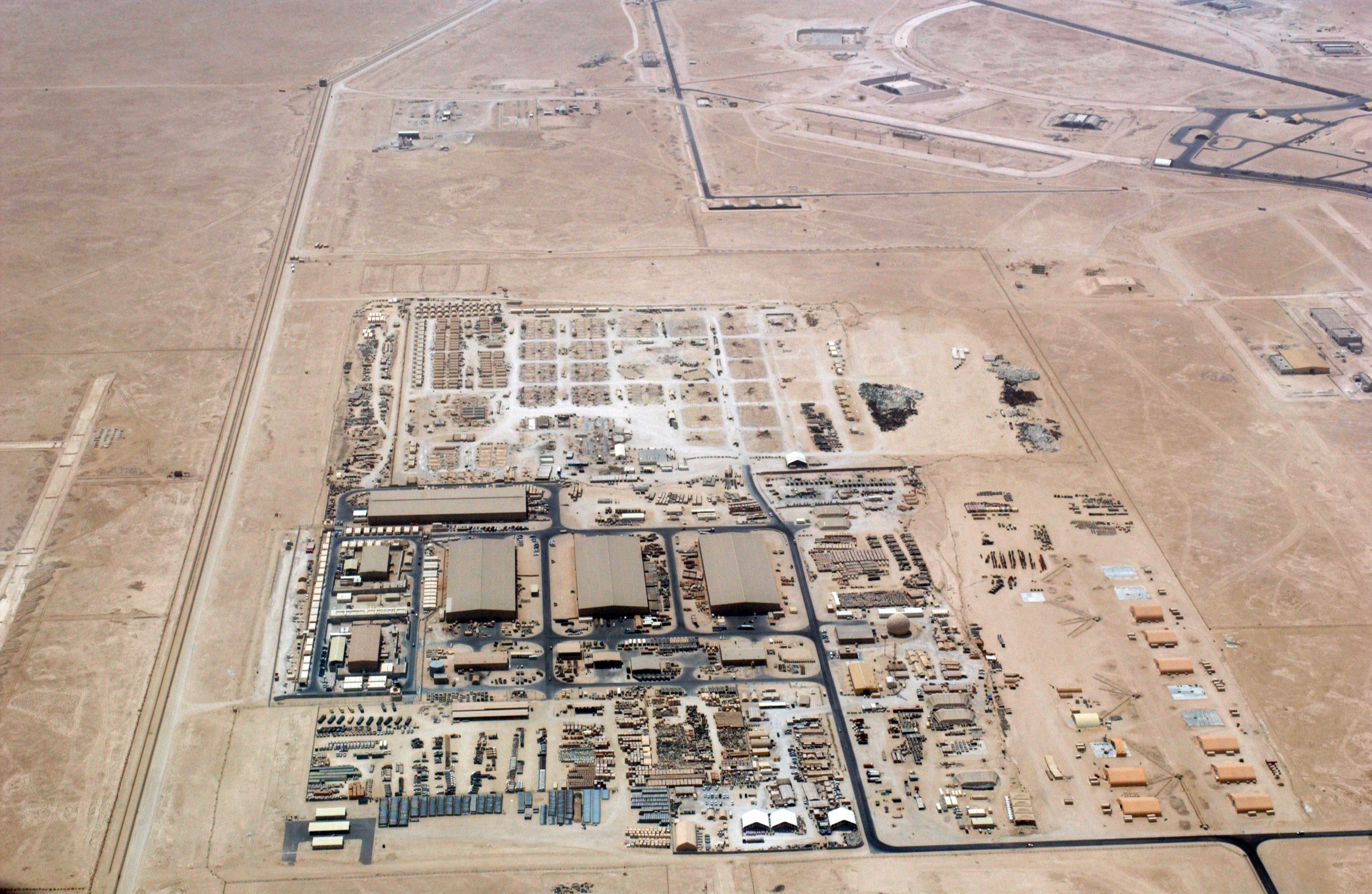
An aerial view of "Log Town" at Al Udeid Air Base in 2004

Following joint military operations during Operation Desert Storm in 1991, Qatar and the United States concluded a Defense Cooperation Agreement that has been subsequently expanded. In 1996, Qatar built Al Udeid Air Base at a cost of more than $1 billion. The U.S. first used the then-secret base in late September 2001, when the U.S. Air Force (USAF) needed to get aircraft in position for its operations in Afghanistan. The U.S. has nearly 40,000 military personnel in the Middle East. The U.S. Fifth Fleet is in Bahrain and has 28,000 military personnel in Kuwait, Bahrain, and Qatar. Kingdoms, including Qatar, cover 60 percent of the costs, around $650 million.

Official acknowledgement of the base came in March 2002, when U.S. Vice President Dick Cheney stopped there during a trip to the region with a group of reporters. In April 2003, shortly after the start of the U.S.-led invasion of Iraq, the U.S. Combat Air Operations Center for the Middle East moved from Prince Sultan Air Base in Saudi Arabia to what was then a backup headquarters, built a year prior in Qatar that was viewed as a more congenial location for basing U.S. troops.

Al Udeid and other facilities in Qatar serve as logistics, command, and basing hubs for the U.S. Central Command (CENTCOM) area of operations, and oversees U.S. air operations in countries, including Iraq, Afghanistan, and Syria.

=== Royal Air Force ===
Between 2004 and 2009 the airbase was used by the British Royal Air Force with transport and fast-jet aircraft to support Operation Telic (Iraq War) and Operation Herrick (War in Afghanistan).

These included 6 to 8 Panavia Tornado GR4 aircraft drawn from different parts of the Royal Air Force as well as multiple Vickers VC10 from the No. 101 Squadron RAF. British Tornados were equipped with a range of stores, including the Vicon Recce Pod, LITENING targeting pod, 1000 lb HE bombs, Paveway II and Paveway III laser-guided bombs, and the RAPTOR Recce Pod. They were chosen for their currency and up-to-date modification state.

The RAF aircraft were accompanied by aircraft engineers and personnel active in support and operation management roles. Between 20 March to 15 April 2003, the Al Udeid Wing of the RAF flew 268 sorties in operations against the Government of Saddam Hussein in Iraq at the start of the Iraq War.

=== Royal Australian Air Force ===
As part of Australia's contribution to coalition forces in the 2003 invasion of Iraq, 14 F/A-18 Hornet fighters from No. 75 Squadron RAAF were based at Al Udeid, along with two Lockheed P-3 Orion maritime patrol aircraft and three Lockheed C-130 Hercules military transport aircraft. During the early phases of the war, the Hornets flew long missions escorting and protecting coalition AWACS early warning aircraft and tanker aircraft used for air-to-air refueling.

Later, when the threat to coalition aircraft was reduced, the Hornets switched to ground attack and combat support roles and were used to attack Iraqi ground forces with laser-guided bombs. The Orions flew long endurance missions over the Persian Gulf tracking vessels, curbing smuggling, and guarding against the threat posed by suicide boats. The deployed Hercules flew supplies and equipment into Iraq, and later flew some of the first humanitarian aid into Baghdad. The 14 Royal Australian Air Force Hornets flew over 670 sorties during the war, including 350 combat sorties over Iraq.

=== Iranian missile strikes ===
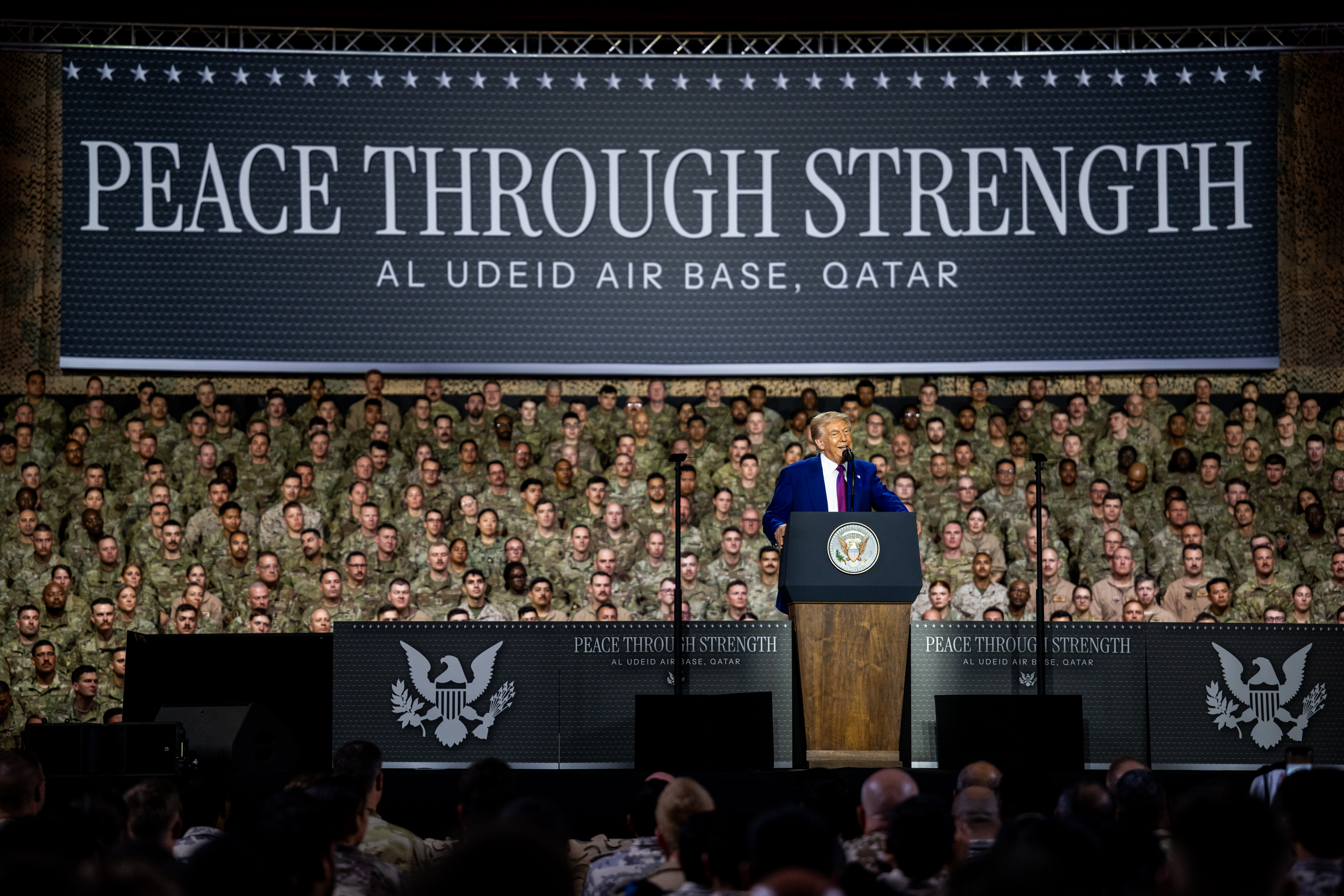
Donald Trump visiting Al Udeid Air Base Qatar in May 2025, 1 month before the Twelve-Day War

On 23 June 2025, as a response to Operation Midnight Hammer by the USA, where nuclear facilities were targeted, Iran started missile strikes on the military base, shortly before 8 p.m. AST and after Qatar had closed its airspace. This was followed by explosions in Doha.

Qatar said that there were no casualties and that all but one missile was intercepted. Iran said six missiles hit successfully. Satellite images by Planet Labs revealed the destruction of the white radome that contained American secure communication equipment.

On 28 February 2026, during the 2026 Iran war, Iran attacked the base again. CBC News, citing the Canadian Department of National Defense's website, reported that Canadian soldiers were present at the time of the attack.

In October 2026, U.S. Senator Chris Murphy said that the Department of Defense had denied him access to Al Udeid Air Base during a congressional delegation visit to the Middle East and had declined to arrange a briefing for him on the Iran war. The Pentagon did not immediately respond to a request for comment.

== Current use ==
=== Qatari Emiri Air Force ===
Al Udeid Air Base is the main headquarters for the Qatar Emiri Air Force, although some of its squadrons are based at Doha International Airport among others.

Structure:

- Al Zaeem Mohamed Bin Abdullah Al Attiyah Air College
  - 30th Squadron with the PAC MFI-395 Super Mushshak
  - 31st Squadron with the Pilatus PC-21
  - 32nd Squadron with the PAC MFI-395 Super Mushshak and the Pilatus PC-21
  - 33rd Squadron with the Airbus Helicopters H125
  - 34th Squadron with the Pilatus PC-24
- Airlift Group
  - Flying Wing 8
    - 10th Transport Squadron with the Boeing C-17A Globemaster III
  - Flying Wing 10
    - 12th Transport Squadron with the Lockheed Martin C-130J-30 Super Hercules
- Helicopter Group
  - Flying Wing 3
    - 20th Squadron with the AgustaWestland AW139
    - 21st Squadron with the AgustaWestland AW139
    - 22nd Squadron with the AgustaWestland AW139
  - Flying Wing 4
    - 41st Squadron with the Boeing AH-64E Apache (QRA)
    - 43rd Squadron with the Boeing AH-64E Apache
- International Flight Training School (IFTS)
  - An unidentified squadron with the Alenia Aermacchi M-346 Master
- Air Combat Group
  - Flying Wing 5
    - 51st Squadron with the Boeing F-15QA Strike Eagle
    - 52nd Squadron with the F-15QA
    - 53rd Squadron with the F-15QA
- Joint Special Forces
  - 121st Squadron with the Viking DHC-6-400
- Ministry of Municipality
  - Strategical Wing
    - An unidentified squadron with the Dassault Falcon 2000LXS and the Diamond DA 42M MPP

=== Royal Air Force ===
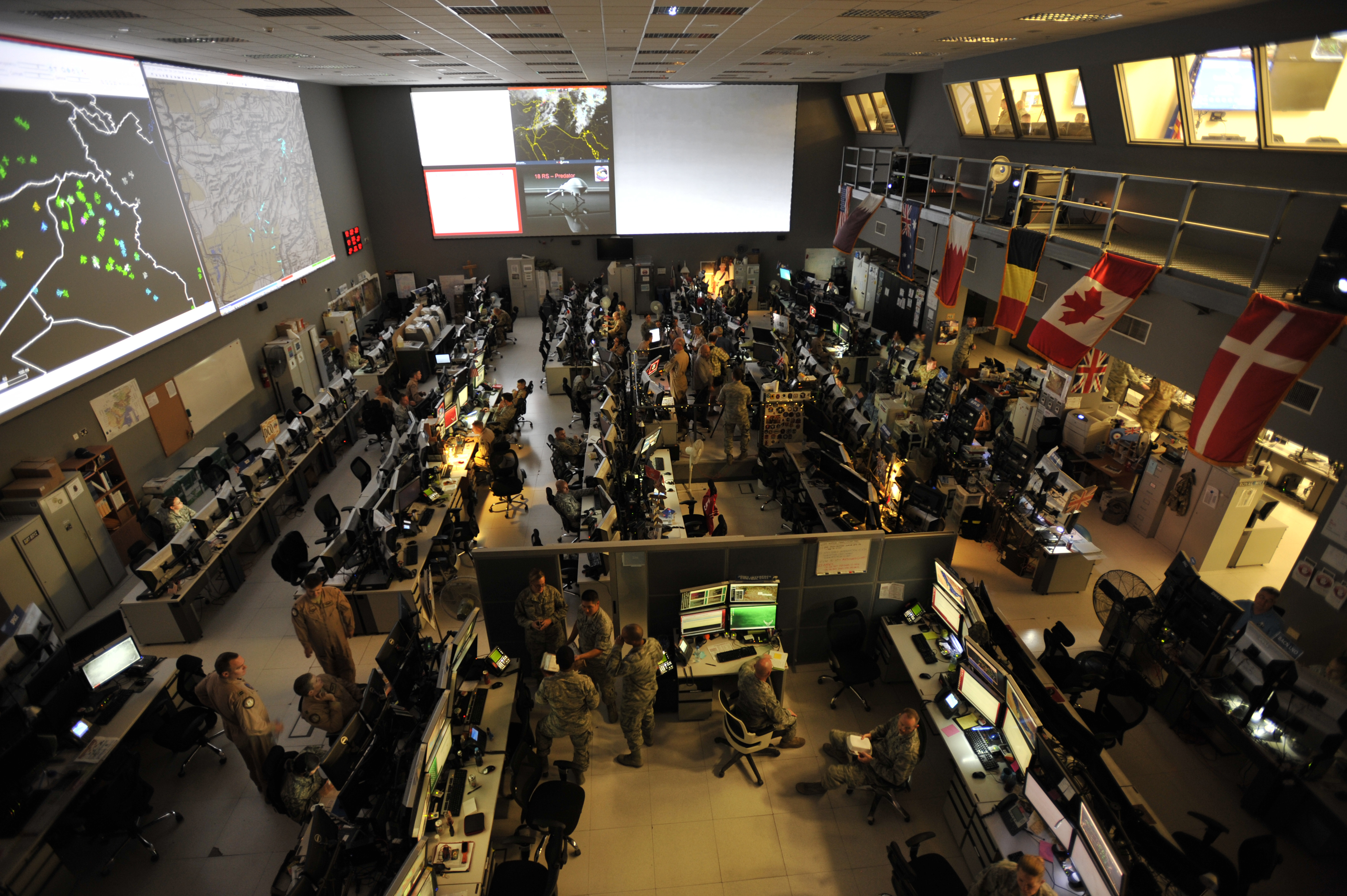
Combined Air and Space Operations Center (CAOC) provided command and control of air power throughout Iraq, Syria, Afghanistan, and 17 other nations.

After the withdrawal of British Tornados and VC10s in Summer 2009 to other locations, Royal Air Force activities at Al Udeid were reduced.

Since 2014 it has been used as HQ for British involvement in airstrikes against ISIS in Iraq (Operation Shader).

The Royal Air Force formally stationed an RC-135 Rivet Joint signals intelligence aircraft at the base to operate over Iraq and Syria, although this aircraft has been pictured operating from Chania International Airport in Crete on occasion.

=== United States Air Force ===
==== Military cooperation and foreign assistance ====
With its small territory and narrow population base, Qatar relies to a large degree on external cooperation and support for its security. Qatar invested over US$1 billion to construct the Al Udeid airfield during the 1990s; it did not have a large air force of its own at the time. The United States Army Corps of Engineers also awarded over $100 million in Military Construction Air Force (MCAF) contracts for the construction of U.S. storage, housing, service, command, and communication facilities.

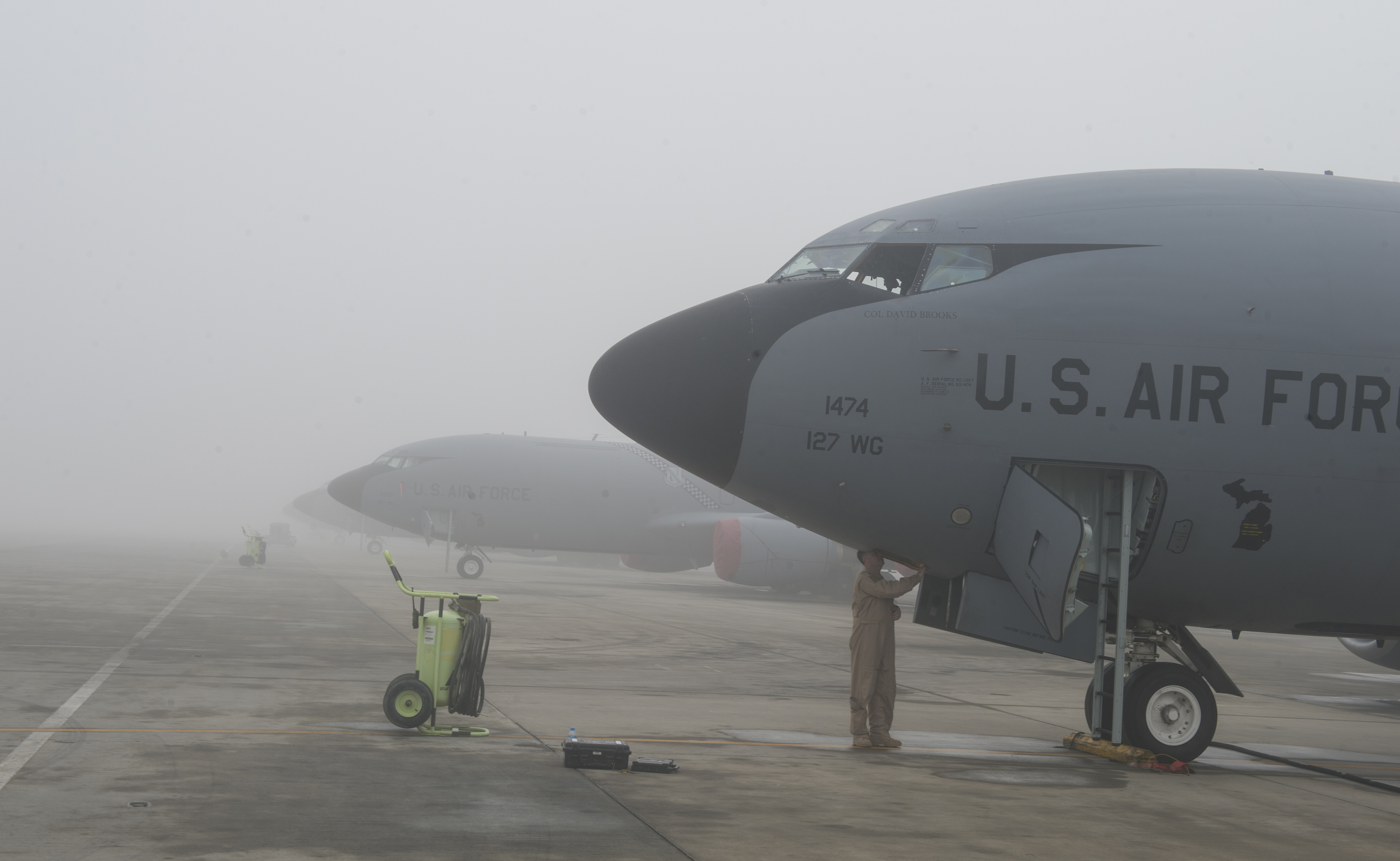
U.S. Air Force KC-135 Stratotankers at Al Udeid Air Base in 2017

In early June 2017, the Pentagon said that the diplomatic rupture and tensions between Qatar and some of its Arab neighbors would not affect U.S. operations at the Air Base.

In June 2019, the base stationed Lockheed Martin F-22 Raptors for the first time. A month later, an expansion of the base was announced to be funded by Qatar, which would cost $1.8 billion.

==== Congress appropriations and authorizations ====
The National Defense Authorization Act for Fiscal Year 2008 (P.L. 110-181) authorized $81.7 million in FY2008 spending to build new Air Force and Special Operations facilities in Qatar.

The National Defense Authorization Act for Fiscal Year 2009 (P.L. 110-417) authorized $69.6 million in FY2009 spending to build new Air Force and Special Operations facilities.

The National Defense Authorization Act for Fiscal Year 2010 (P.L. 111-84) authorized $117 million in FY2010 spending to build new Air Force recreational, dormitory, and other facilities at Al Udeid.

== See also ==
- Pizza Cat – Calico cat that resides in Al Udeid Air Base
- List of United States Air Force installations
