= Military Construction and Veterans Affairs, and Related Agencies Appropriations Act, 2014 =

- Long title: Making appropriations for military construction, the Department of Veterans Affairs, and related agencies for the fiscal year ending September 30, 2014, and for other purposes.
- Announced in: the 113th United States Congress
- Sponsored by: Rep. John Culberson (R-TX)
- Number of co-sponsors: 0

Codification
- Acts affected: Defense Base Closure and Realignment Act of 1990, Alaska Native Claims Settlement Act, Congressional Budget Act of 1974, Duncan Hunter National Defense Authorization Act for Fiscal Year 2009, and others
- U.S.C. sections affected: 10 U.S.C. § 2806, 10 U.S.C. § 2883, 10 U.S.C. § 2687(note), 23 U.S.C. § 210, and many others
- Agencies affected: United States Congress, United States Department of Justice, United States Department of the Navy, United States Marine Corps, NATO, United States Department of the Army, United States Department of Veterans Affairs, Veterans Health Administration, National Cemetery Administration, Veterans Benefits Administration, General Services Administration, United States Department of the Air Force, Air National Guard, United States Department of Transportation, Federal Highway Administration, Indian Health Service, United States Army Corps of Engineers, United States Department of Defense
- Appropriations: At least $159,709,298,000.00 with an additional unlimited amount

[H.R. 2216 Legislative history]
- Introduced in the House as H.R. 2216 by Rep. John Culberson (R-TX) on May 28, 2013; Committee consideration by United States House Committee on Appropriations; Passed the House on June 4, 2013 (Roll Call 193: 421-4)

The Military Construction and Veterans Affairs, and Related Agencies Appropriations Act, 2014 (H.R. 2216) is an appropriations bill that was introduced into the United States House of Representatives during the 113th United States Congress. The bill would appropriate money to various government agencies related to the United States Department of Defense and the United States Department of Veterans Affairs. This funding would be used during fiscal year 2014, which ends September 30, 2014. According to its committee report, "the purpose of the bill is to support our military and their families and provide the benefits and medical care that our veterans have earned for their service." The report also indicated that the Committee had made its decisions with the national debt and budget deficit in mind.

According to the Committee report: "The Committee recommends $157,782,090,000 in budget authority for the fiscal year 2014 programs and activities funded in the bill. In addition, advance appropriations of $55,634,227,000 are provided for fiscal year 2015 medical programs of the Department of Veterans Affairs. The fiscal year 2014 recommendation is an increase of $12,939,319,000 above the fiscal year 2013 enacted level (defined as the amount provided within Public Law 113–6 and excluding emergency funding, disaster relief adjustments, the 251A sequester and the section 3004 Office of Management and Budget adjustment) and $1,370,117,000 below the President’s request. Included in this amount is $84,461,636,000 in mandatory budget authority and $73,320,454,000 in discretionary budget authority."

The bill was later incorporated as Division J of the Consolidated Appropriations Act, 2014, which was enacted in January 2014.

== Provisions/Elements of the bill ==
This summary is based largely on the summary provided by the Congressional Research Service, a public domain source.

Title I: Department of Defense would appropriate funds for FY2014 for the United States Department of Defense (DOD) for: (1) military construction for the Army, Navy and Marine Corps, and Air Force (military departments), DOD, the Army National Guard and Air National Guard, and the United States Army Reserve, United States Navy Reserve, and Air Force reserve; (2) the North Atlantic Treaty Organization (NATO) Security Investment Program; (3) family housing construction and related operation and maintenance for the military departments and DOD; (4) the Department of Defense Family Housing Improvement Fund; (5) chemical demilitarization construction; and (6) the Department of Defense Base Closure Account.

It also specifies restrictions and authorizations regarding the use of funds appropriated in this title and in other military construction appropriations Acts.

- (Sec. 110) Prohibits appropriated funds from being used to initiate a new installation overseas without prior notification to the congressional appropriations committees.
- (Sec. 113) Directs the Secretary of Defense (Secretary) to notify the appropriate congressional committees 30 days in advance of the plans and scope of any proposed military exercise involving U.S. personnel if construction costs are anticipated to exceed $100,000.
- (Sec. 119) Authorizes the transfer of DOD funds for expenses associated with the Homeowners Assistance Program under the Metropolitan Demonstration Cities and Metropolitan Development Act of 1966.
- (Sec. 122) Places specified restrictions and limitations on the obligation or expenditure of funds made available in this title or in any other military construction appropriations Act to carry out a military construction, land acquisition, or family housing project at or for a military installation approved for closure, or for supporting a function that has been approved for realignment to another installation, in 2005 under the Defense Base Closure and Realignment Act of 1990.
- (Sec. 123) Provides for the transfer of lapsed unobligated military construction and family housing funds into the Foreign Currency Fluctuations, Defense account.
- (Sec. 124) Prohibits this Act's funds from being used for any action that relates to or promotes the expansion of the boundaries or size of the Pinon Canyon Maneuver Site, Colorado.
- (Sec. 125) Prohibits the Secretary of the Army from using appropriated funds to relocate an Army unit that: (1) performs a testing mission or function that is not performed by any other Army unit and is statutorily required, and (2) is located at a military installation at which the total number of Army civilian employees and contractor personnel exceeds 10% of the total number of regular and reserve Army personnel assigned there. Allows an exception if such Secretary notifies the defense committees of such relocation's compliance with Army Regulation 5-10 concerning the policy, procedures, and responsibilities for Army stationing actions.
- (Sec. 126) Rescinds specified funds under prior appropriations Acts for: (1) military construction for the Army, Navy and Marine Corps, DOD, and the Air National Guard; and (2) the DOD Homeowners Assistance Program. Excludes from such rescissions any appropriations designated for contingency operations directly related to the global war on terrorism or as an emergency requirement.
- (Sec. 133) Reduces by $4.668 million discretionary appropriations in this title.
- (Sec. 135) Appropriates funds, to be available through FY2018, for the planning and design of certain construction projects of critical importance to the Armed Forces. Requires the Secretary to submit to the appropriations committees an expenditure plan with respect to such funds.

Title II: Department of Veterans Affairs would authorize appropriations for the Department of Veterans Affairs (VA) for: (1) the Veterans Benefits Administration, (2) readjustment benefits, (3) veterans insurance and indemnities, (4) the Veterans Housing Benefit Program Fund, (5) the Vocational Rehabilitation Loans Program, (6) the Native American Veteran Housing Loan Program, (7) the Veterans Health Administration (including for medical and prosthetic research and information technology systems), (8) the National Cemetery Administration, (9) the Office of the Inspector General, (10) construction for major and minor projects, and (11) grants for the construction of state extended care facilities and veterans cemeteries.

It also specifies restrictions and authorizations regarding the use of funds appropriated in this title.

- (Sec. 210) Makes funds from this title available to reimburse expenses of the Office of Resolution Management and the Office of Employment Discrimination Complaint Adjudication, within specified limits.
- (Sec. 216) Authorizes the Secretary of Veterans Affairs (Secretary, for purposes of this title) to enter into agreements with certain Indian tribes and tribal organizations in rural Alaska to provide health care, including behavioral health and dental care.
- (Sec. 219) Directs the Secretary to report quarterly to the appropriations committees on the financial status of the Veterans Health Administration (VHA).
- (Sec. 223) Allows certain VA funds to be used to fund operations of the Captain James A. Lovell Federal Health Care Center. Requires written notification from the Secretary to the appropriations committees of any fund transfers for such purpose.
- (Sec. 226) Directs the Secretary to notify the appropriations committees on all bid savings in major construction projects that total at least $5 million or 5% of the programmed amount, whichever is less.
- (Sec. 228) Directs the Secretary to notify the appropriations committees quarterly concerning any single national outreach and awareness marketing campaign in which obligations exceed $2 million.
- (Sec. 229) Requires the Secretary to submit a reprogramming request to the appropriations committees if, at any time during FY2014, the funding allocated for a medical care initiative identified in the FY2014 expenditure plan is adjusted by more than $25 million from the allocation shown in the corresponding budget justification.
- (Sec. 230) Rescinds specified: (1) discretionary appropriations in this title; and (2) funds made available in the Consolidated and Further Continuing Appropriations Act, 2013 for the VA's Medical services, Medical support and compliance, and Medical facilities accounts.

Title III: Related Agencies would appropriate funds for: (1) the American Battle Monuments Commission, (2) the United States Court of Appeals for Veterans Claims, (3) cemeterial expenses, and (4) the Armed Forces Retirement Home.

Finally, Title IV: General Provisions would specify restrictions and authorities regarding the use of funds appropriated in this Act.

- (Sec. 407) Prohibits this Act's funds from being used for: (1) a project or program named for an individual serving as a Member, Delegate, or Resident Commissioner of the U.S. House of Representatives; (2) maintaining or establishing a computer network unless such network blocks the viewing, downloading, and exchanging of pornography; (3) funding the Association of Community Organizations for Reform Now (ACORN); (4) exercising the power of eminent domain without the payment of just compensation; (5) paying for first class travel by an agency employee in contravention of federal employee travel requirements; (6) renovating, expanding, or constructing any facility in the United States in order to house any non-U.S. citizen detained at U.S. Naval Station, Guantanamo Bay, Cuba; or (7) entering into a contract or agreement with any corporation that was convicted of a felony criminal violation within the preceding 24 months, or that carries an unpaid federal tax liability.
- (Sec. 418) Prohibits the applicable allocation of new budget authority under this Act from exceeding the amount of proposed new budget authority.
- (Sec. 419) Prohibits funds from being used to pay more than 75% of the salary of any senior VA official from July 1 – September 30, 2014, unless, as of the earlier date, the percentage of disability compensation claims that are more than 125 days old is less than or equal to 40.
- (Sec. 420) Prohibits funds from being used: (1) for any conference for which agency cost exceeds $500,000; (2) to pay a performance award to career VA appointees; (3) to contract with entities or individuals convicted within the last three years of fraudulent or antitrust action in connection with a public contract or subcontract, are presently indicted for any of the preceding, or who have delinquent federal taxes in excess of $3,000; (4) to propose, plan for, or execute a new or additional base realignment and closure round; (5) to award any contract greater than $1 million for which DOD did not receive at least two offers; (6) to increase funding for under-construction major medical facility projects above specified limits; (7) to lease or purchase new light duty vehicles for any agency fleet or inventory, except in accordance with a specified presidential memorandum; and (8) to maintain or improve DOD real property with a zero percent utilization rate (with exceptions).

== Procedural history ==
=== House ===
The Military Construction and Veterans Affairs, and Related Agencies Appropriations Act, 2014 (H.R. 2216) was introduced on May 28, 2013 by the United States House Committee on Appropriations Chairman Rep. John Carter (R-TX). It was reported alongside House Report 113-90. This 94-page report includes an explanatory summary, minority views from several members, and a variety of charts comparing budget requests with the proposed FY 2014 funding. On May 28, 2013, the bill was placed on the Union Calendar, calendar 63. On June 4, 2013, the House resolved itself in the Committee of the Whole to debate the Military Construction and Veterans Affairs, and Related Agencies Appropriations Act, 2014 with Rep. Ileana Ros-Lehtinen (R-FL) as the designated chairman. The Committee of the Whole debated the bill and various amendments until 8:06pm on June 4 when the bill passed in Roll Call 193 with a vote of 421-4.

=== Senate ===
The Military Construction and Veterans Affairs, and Related Agencies Appropriations Act, 2014 was received in the United States Senate on June 6, 2013 and then referred to the United States Senate Committee on Appropriations.

=== Presidential response ===
On June 3, 2013, President of the United States Barack Obama and his Administration released a statement on H.R. 2216. The President's statement expressed the hope that some changes could be made to the bill. One change the President would like to see made to the bill is the addition of a 1% pay increase for all Federal civilian employees. Another criticism was that the Administration "strongly opposes section 413", a section which would prohibit the executive branch from using any of the appropriated funds to "construct, renovate, or expand any facility in the United States to house individuals held in the detention facility at Guantanamo Bay." The Administration argues that this is too strong of a constrain on their power. The statement included the announcement that "the President’s senior advisors would recommend that he veto H.R. 2216" unless various changes were made. The same veto threat was issued about the Department of Homeland Security Appropriations Act, 2014 in a push by the President to force action about the 2014 United States federal budget. Despite this veto threat, the House passed the bill 421-4 the next day.

== Debate and discussion ==
According to the watchdog website, Washingtonwatch.com, if passed this bill would cost $1,481.10 per average family.

According to the National Coalition for Homeless Veterans, the bill would fund programs in the Department of Veterans Affairs designed to combat homelessness among veterans at the highest level in history.

== See also ==
- List of bills in the 113th United States Congress
- appropriations bill
