= Pizza Cat =

Cat living in Al Udeid Air Base

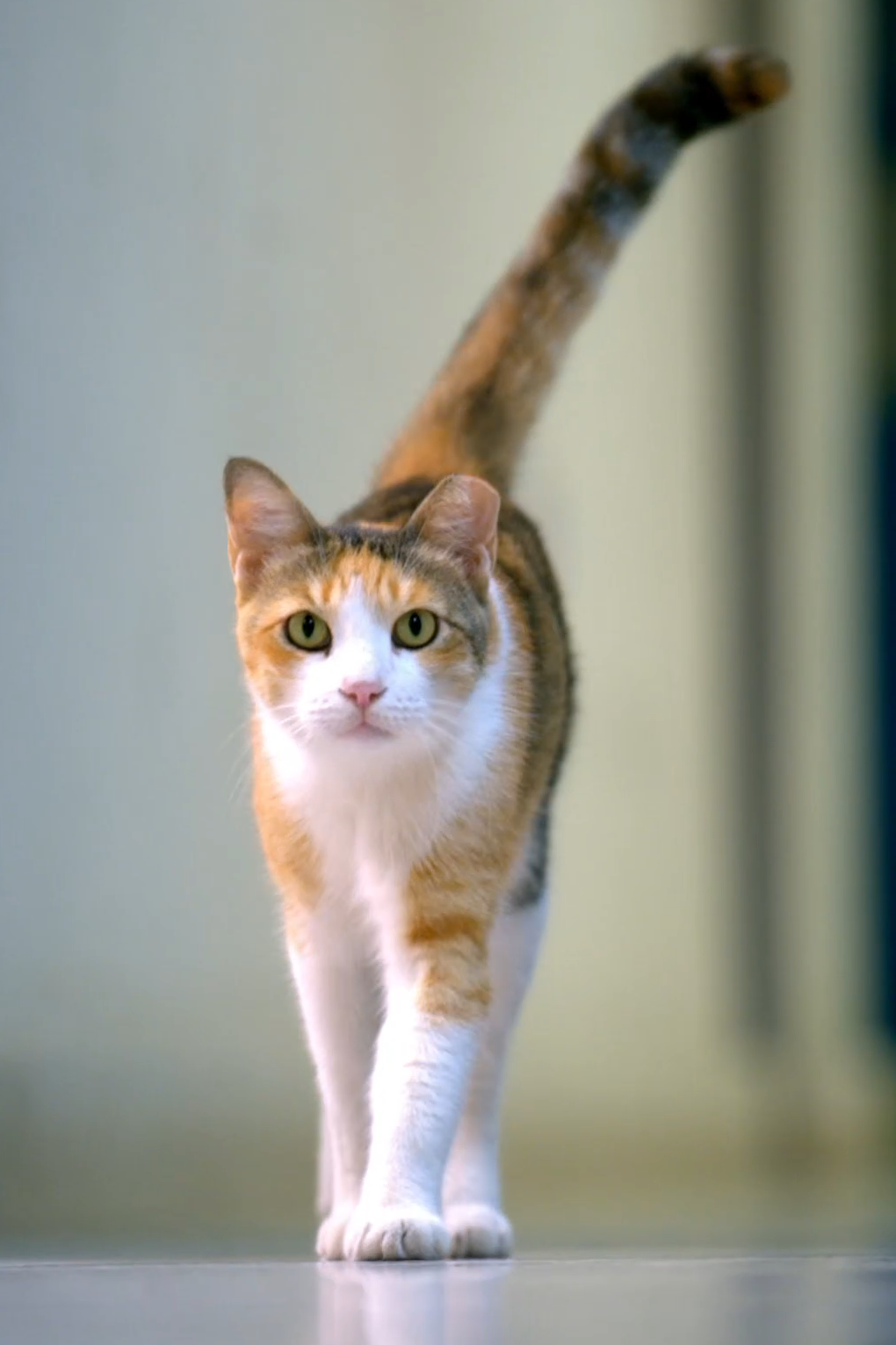
- Pizza Cat in 2025
- Other names: Queen of the Deid, قط بيتزا (qitt baytza)
- Species: Cat
- Breed: Calico domestic shorthair
- Sex: Female
- Born: c. 2015 (age 10–11)
- Occupation: Pest control specialist
- Known for: Residence at Al Udeid Air Base Morale figure Holding the rank of "senior meowster sergeant"

Pizza Cat (also known as "The Queen of the Deid") is a calico cat living in Al Udeid Air Base, Qatar. She is frequently seen near the base's Pizza Hut, but is also known to wander other locations in the base. According to Air & Space Forces Magazine, her "consistent, friendly presence" has led her to become beloved and recognized by base personnel as "one of the greatest contributors" to base morale. Despite her name, she "reportedly survives on mice", and has been described by the United States Air Force (USAF) as a "pest control specialist".

Though she is considered to be a stray cat, Pizza Cat receives regular veterinary care. She is spayed, and was last vaccinated in November 2024 by military working dog veterinarians, who also specialize in other species.

== Popularity and recognition ==
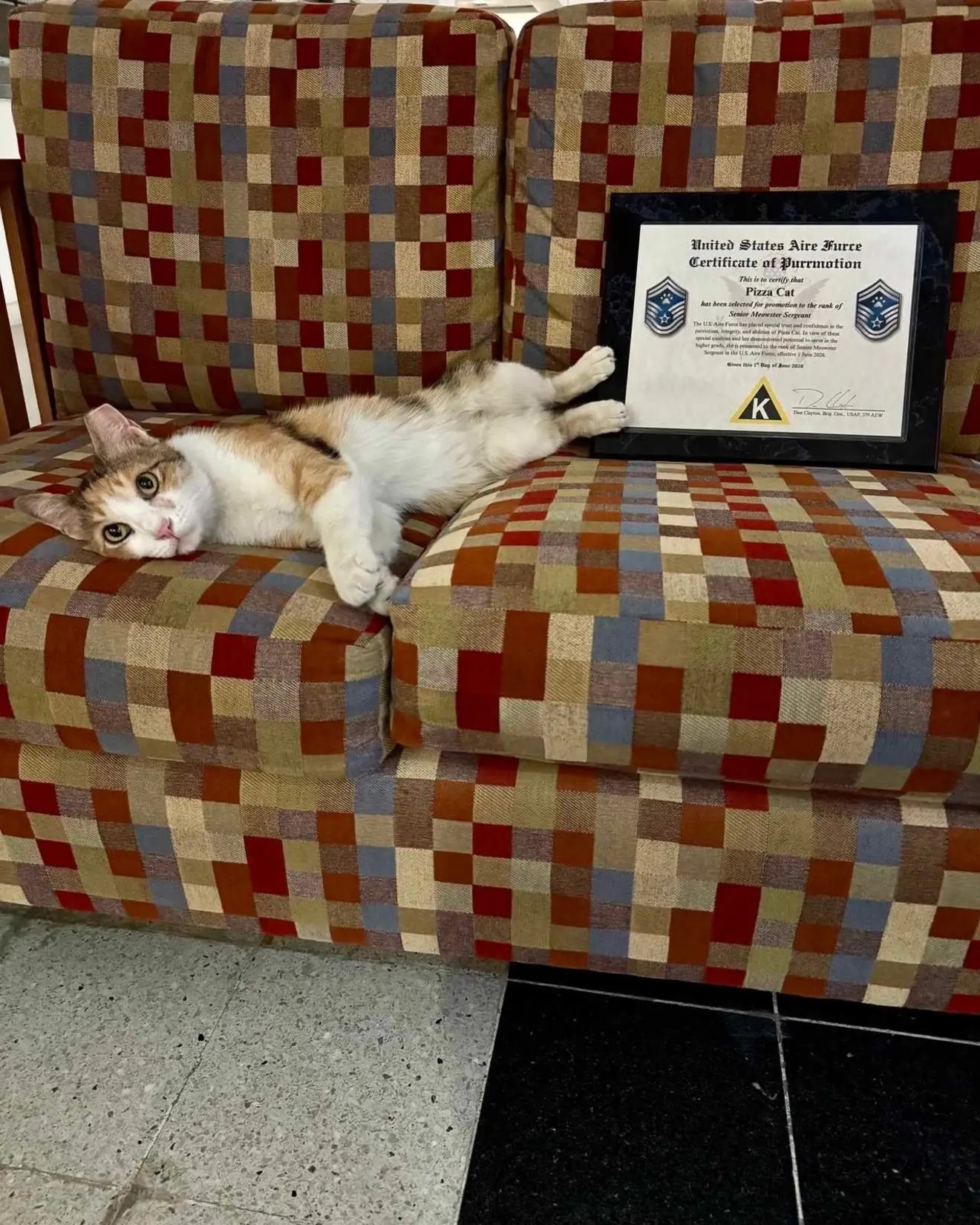
Pizza Cat alongside her June 2026 "certificate of purrmotion" to "senior meowster sergeant"

Pizza Cat is believed to have been living on Al Udeid Air Base since 2015. Her longstanding presence has led her to becoming a "neighborhood icon" to troops deployed to the base. Particularly, Pizza Cat's popularity with USAF personnel has led to regular "proof of life" photos being posted to the unofficial Air Force subreddit, as well as the creation of morale patches dedicated to her.

On 16 May 2022, Pizza Cat was awarded the rank of "meowster sergeant" (a play on "master sergeant").

Following the 2025 Iranian strikes on Al Udeid Air Base, a base memo was released confirming that Pizza Cat survived the attack.

In July 2025, rumors were circulated online claiming that Pizza Cat was to be removed or euthanized due to a change in USCENTCOM policy, prompting outcry from veterans and troops on social media. A wave of photos and memes celebrating the cat were shared on social media, as well as offers from veterans to adopt her. Base officials have since debunked the rumors, stating that "there are no plans, guidance or direction given to euthanize or remove Pizza Cat".

On 1 June 2026, Pizza Cat was given the unofficial rank of "senior meowster sergeant" (a play on the rank of senior master sergeant) via a "certificate of purrmotion" in the "United States Aire Furce" in recognition of her "patriotism, integrity, and abilities". Her promotion was certified by Brigadier General Dan Clayton on his last day as commander of the 379th Air Expeditionary Wing.

Shortly thereafter, in July, amid the 2026 Iran war, the storied feline was reported missing from her usual on-base haunts, prompting fears that she had either been relocated or had died unexpectedly. On 28 July 2026, social media reported her being located safely by members of the base's security forces squadron in an effort dubbed "Operation Deep Dish."

== See also ==
- List of individual cats
- Cats and the Internet
- Pizza Rat
