= Laboratory Response Network =

U.S. federal government initiative to detect biological and chemical threats

The Laboratory Response Network (LRN) is a collaborative effort within the US federal government involving the Association of Public Health Laboratories and the Centers for Disease Control and Prevention (CDC). Most state public health laboratories participate as reference laboratories (formerly level B/C) of the LRN. These facilities support hundreds of sentinel (formerly level A) laboratories in local hospitals throughout the United States and can provide sophisticated confirmatory diagnosis and typing of biological agents that may be used in a bioterrorist attack or other bio-agent incident. The LRN was established in 1999.

== Levels ==
The LRN consists of a loose network of government labs at three levels:

=== Sentinel Laboratories ===
These laboratories, found in many hospitals and local public health facilities, have the ability to rule out specific bioterrorism threat agents, to handle specimens safely, and to forward specimens to higher-level labs within the network.

=== Reference Laboratories ===
These laboratories (more than 100), typically found at state health departments and at military, veterinary, agricultural, and water-testing facilities, can rule on the presence of the various biological threat agents. They can use BSL-3 practices and can often conduct nucleic acid amplification and molecular typing studies.

=== National Laboratories ===
These laboratories, including those at CDC and U.S. Army Medical Research Institute of Infectious Diseases (USAMRIID), can use BSL-4 practices and serve as the final authority in the evaluation of potential bioterrorism specimens. They provide specialized reagents to lower level laboratories and have the ability to bank specimens, perform serotyping, and detect genetic recombinants and chimeras.

== See also ==
- BioWatch
