= National Biodefense Strategy =

In the United States, the National Biodefense Strategy is a White House-issued policy document laying out the federal government's approach to biodefense and biosecurity.

The document's most recent version was published in October 2022 by the Biden Administration as the "National Biodefense Strategy and Implementation Plan for Countering Biological Threats, Enhancing Pandemic Preparedness, and Achieving Global Health." It aims "to create a world free from catastrophic biological incidents, laying out a set of objectives to effectively counter the spectrum of biological threats." The 2022 strategy updates the prior 2018 strategy published by the Trump Administration, which the federal government was directed to adopt by the National Defense Authorization Act for Fiscal Year 2017.

== History and background ==
Prior to the 2018 congressional directive, previous U.S. government biodefense strategies existed, including the George W. Bush administration's 2004 Homeland Security Presidential Directive-10 ("Biodefense for the 21st Century"), which was one of many laws and executive actions enacted following the 2001 anthrax attacks. The push for increased federal funding in biodefense began during Bush's term in office. For example, in 2006, Bush, in his annual budget request, asked for a total of $5.1 billion for civilian biodefense. This number was a decrease of $2.5 billion from the previous year's budget. The drop was primarily attributed to the absence of Project BioShield money in 2006; the money for that year was already allocated the previous year. Overall, the 2006 request contained incremental increases for all agencies involved in biodefense. Homeland Security Presidential Directive-10's primary focus was on preventing, detecting, and responding to potential intentional attacks using biological weapons, and set forth the role of the nascent U.S. Department of Homeland Security and other institutions.

During the Obama administration, the 2009 National Strategy for Countering Biological Threats and the 2012 National Strategy for Biosurveillance built on the Bush administration's work, and expanded biodefense strategy to emphasis global health security and other public health crises, whether of "natural, accidental, or deliberate origin." The Obama administration biodefense strategies encompass "human, animal, and plant health" and included roles for "federal, state, local, and tribal governments, the private sector, nongovernmental organizations, and international partners."

The bipartisan Blue Ribbon Study Panel on Biodefense, a privately sponsored group examining biodefense issues, convened in 2014 and issued a report in 2015. The panel, co-chaired by former governor of Pennsylvania Tom Ridge, warned "that the U.S. is dangerously vulnerable to a large-scale biological attack and has urged Washington to develop a more comprehensive strategy." The panel specifically found that the U.S. had not adopted a comprehensive biodefense strategy over "a decade of profusion of policy directives," and noted that there was a fracturing of responsibility for biodefense across multiple agencies and levels of government. These concerns prompted the U.S. Congress to include a provision in the National Defense Authorization Act for Fiscal Year 2017 that required the secretaries of Defense, Health and Human Services, Homeland Security, and Agriculture to coordinate to produce a comprehensive strategy for countering biological warfare threats and other biological threats.

== 2018 Strategy ==
Following the congressional directive, in September 2018, President Trump announced and issued the strategy. The strategy placed the U.S. Department of Health and Human Services in charge of leading the federal government's biodefense efforts, and designated HHS to lead a committee of high-level officials from the Defense Department, Agriculture Department, and Homeland Security Departments, to review the biodefense capabilities of the United States Intelligence Community and 15 other executive branch agencies—i.e., the agencies' capacity to counter naturally occurring and human-caused biological threats. Trump's National Security Adviser John Bolton said that the National Security Council would assist in the development of policy, and the interagency committee led by HHS would implement policy changes. Trump said that the strategy drew lessons from the 2014 West African Ebola virus epidemic. The policy was the work product of the reorganized NSC under Bolton.

According to Politico, "Senior administration officials later said threats could be better addressed by streamlining processes for biotech companies to work with the HHS's Biomedical Advanced Research and Development Authority, which supports private sector development of vaccines and drugs."

One official from the Trump Administration said that the government's accounting requirements have made it difficult and undesirable for many companies to participate.

HHS Assistant Secretary Robert Kadlec said that one of his top priorities was to get a decade-long extension of the Project BioShield Special Reserve Fund. The government can use that fund to buy countermeasures like vaccines, medication, and diagnostic tools. The fund was first authorized under President George W. Bush in 2004.

Later, the Donald Trump administration announced they would siphon funds from medical programs to supplement fundings for the strategy. When questioned about this, it was reported that the Obama administration provided the plans for the strategy.

== 2022 Strategy ==
The Biden Administration's October 2022 National Biodefense Strategy and Implementation Plan has five goals with associated objectives for strengthening US biodefense, including (objectives for each goal are listed in the document):

1. Enable risk awareness and detection to inform decision-making across the biodefense enterprise: "The United States will build risk awareness at the strategic level through analyses and coordinated research efforts to characterize naturally occurring, accidental, and deliberate biological risks"
2. Ensure biodefense enterprise capabilities to prevent bioincidents: "The United States will work to prevent the outbreak and spread of naturally occurring infectious diseases and minimize the risk of laboratory accidents both domestically and globally. The United States will also strengthen biosecurity to prevent both state and non-state actors from obtaining or using biological material, equipment, and expertise for nefarious purposes"
3. Ensure biodefense enterprise preparedness to reduce the impacts of bioincidents: "The United States will take measures to reduce the impacts of bioincidents, including maintaining a vibrant national science and technology base to support biodefense; promoting a strong domestic and international public, veterinary, and plant health infrastructure; developing, updating, and exercising response and recovery capabilities; establishing risk communications; developing and effectively distributing and dispensing countermeasures"
4. Rapidly respond to limit the impacts of bioincidents: "The United States will respond rapidly to limit the impacts of bioincidents through information sharing and networking; evidence-driven, coordinated response operations and investigations; effective public messaging; and research"
5. Facilitate recovery to restore the community, the economy, and the environment after a bioincident: "The United States will take actions to restore critical infrastructure services and capability; coordinate recovery activities; provide recovery support and long-term mitigation; and minimize cascading effects elsewhere in the world"

The document also lays out a number of assumptions behind its strategic approach, including (full explanations in the document):

- Biological Threats Are Persistent
- Biological Threats Originate from Multiple Sources
- Infectious Diseases Do Not Respect Borders
- Biological Incidents Impact Critical Infrastructure and Supply Chains
- Multisectoral and Multilateral Cooperation Is Critical for Effective Biodefense
- A One Health Approach Reduces the Occurrence and Impact of Bioincidents
- Science and Technology Will Continue to Advance Globally
