= Pizza Rat =

Internet meme

- New York City rat taking pizza home on the subway (Pizza Rat™)

Pizza Rat is an Internet meme based around a viral video of a brown rat carrying a slice of pizza down the steps of a New York City Subway station in Manhattan. The video was first uploaded to Instagram on September 21, 2015, and a copy was uploaded to YouTube later. As of September 2026 the YouTube video had more than 12.35 million views.

== Impact ==
Within hours of the video's posting, #PizzaRat was trending on Twitter, and by September 23, the clip had been viewed over five million times. Articles were quickly written by Gawker, BuzzFeed, DNAinfo, and Gothamist. Pizza Rat costumes, as well as "sexy" Pizza Rat costumes, were created and worn for Halloween that year.

Popular Science identified the rat as a common brown rat, and noted the rarity of humans to be able to get as close to them as Matt Little, the individual who originally posted the video to YouTube, did while filming the video. They attributed this to either the rat being too hungry to run, or more used to humans than other rats.

The Washington Post created a timeline of the meme's progression, starting with its upload on September 21. The article argued that journalists and marketers attempting to gain clout from the meme, as well as the users themselves oversharing it, led to the meme's death within two days of its initial creation.

Zardulu, a New York City-based performance artist, claimed credit for staging the original video as well as several other viral hoaxes in an interview with The Washington Post. However, Little denies that the video was a hoax and states that they have no association with Zardulu.

== See also ==
- Chicago rat hole
- First Avenue station (BMT Canarsie Line)
- Pizza Cat
- Rats in New York City
