= National Biosurveillance Strategy =

The United States National Biosurveillance Strategy is the plan to implement a biosurveillance system that will monitor and interpret data that might relate to disease activity and threats to human or animal health – whether infectious, toxic, metabolic, and regardless of intentional or natural origin – in order to achieve early warning of health threats, early detection of health events and overall situational awareness of disease activity.

== Types of data collection ==
It is debated whether is it better to engage in a “more data, faster is better” approach or whether it would be more effective to pursue fewer but more meaningful data streams. Some of the things that will be monitored are counts of clinical diagnoses, sales of over-the-counter remedies, and school absentees among select age groups.

== Proposed plan ==
The Department of Homeland Security laid out the plan for the national biosurveillance system. They stated that an effect surveillance system relies on five key principles that are generally applied to public health and medical preparedness. The first is being prepared for all potential catastrophic health events; the second is having vertical and horizontal coordination among all levels of government; the third is having a regional approach to health preparedness; the fourth is the engagement of the private sector, academia, and other nongovernmental entities; the fifth is the important roles of individuals, families, and communities. The biosurveillance program must be nationwide, robust, and integrated with international disease systems in order to provide early warning and ongoing characterization of disease outbreaks in real-time. The system must be sufficiently able to identify a specific disease and its prevalence in varying populations and environments and must be able to tailor the analysis to new diseases. The system should create a networked system to allow for two-way information flow between and among Federal, State, and local government public health authorities and clinical health care providers. The system shall build upon existing Federal, State, and local surveillance systems where they exists and should enable and provide incentive for public health agencies to implement surveillance systems where they do not exist.

== See also ==
- Disease surveillance
- Public health surveillance
