= Biosurveillance =

Aspect of biodefense

Biosurveillance is an aspect of biodefense relating to the detection of biological threats, including bioterrorist threats.

BioWatch is a US government program to detect biological agents present in the environment through a system of filters.
