= DHS Office of Health Affairs =

Agency overview
- Formed: 2003
- Jurisdiction: United States
- Headquarters: DHS Nebraska Avenue Complex, Washington D.C.
- Employees: 101 (2012)
- Annual budget: $0.2 billion (2012)
- Agency executive: Katherine Brinsfield, Assistant Secretary
- Parent agency: Department of Homeland Security
- Website: DHS Office of Health Affairs

The Office of Health Affairs (OHA) is a component within the United States Department of Homeland Security. OHA provides health and medical expertise in support of the department's mission to prepare for, respond to, and recover from all hazards affecting the nation’s health security. This included the execution of ″Project BioWatch″, an early warning detection network of air samplers in more than 30 US cities.

The Office of Health Affairs was led by the Assistant Secretary of Homeland Security for Health Affairs, who also serves as the DHS chief medical officer and who is appointed by the President of the United States with confirmation by the United States Senate. The current assistant secretary is Katherine Brinsfield. The OHA was absorbed into the DHS Countering WMD Office in 2018.

== Budget ==
DHS Health Affairs Budget, FY11-13 ($ in thousands)
Line Item	FY11 Actual	FY12 Actual	FY13 Request
Salaries and Expenses	26,999	29,671	27,757
BioWatch	100,780	114,164	125,294
National Biosurvelliance Integration Center	7,000	12,013	8,000
Planning and Coordination	2,276	6,162	4,907
Chemical Defense Program	2,400	5,439	500
Total Budget	139,455	167,449	166,458
