= BioWatch =

United States federal government program

BioWatch is a United States federal government program to detect the release of pathogens into the air as part of a terrorist attack on major American cities. Reportedly operating in Philadelphia, New York City, Washington, DC, San Diego, Boston, Chicago, San Francisco, Atlanta, St. Louis, Houston, Los Angeles and 21 other cities, the BioWatch program was created in 2001 in response to the increased threat of bioterrorism sparked by the 2001 anthrax attacks, and was announced in President George W. Bush's State of the Union Address of 2003.

The program, described as "the nation's first early warning network of sensors to detect biological attack" operates via a system of filters located within existing Environmental Protection Agency air filters that monitor air quality. Results from these filters are analyzed by the Centers for Disease Control and Prevention, who pass any significant results to the Federal Bureau of Investigation.

As of mid-2012, the system had generated a large number of false positives (alerts that are determined to be naturally occurring and not terrorist releases), with more than 50 such cases documented between 2003 and 2008. State and local health officials have never ordered evacuations or distributed emergency medicines in response to a positive reading from the system.

In an audit reported by Associated Press on March 4 2021, BioWatch was said to have failed in detecting known threats, questioning the value of the program.

== History ==
=== Origins ===
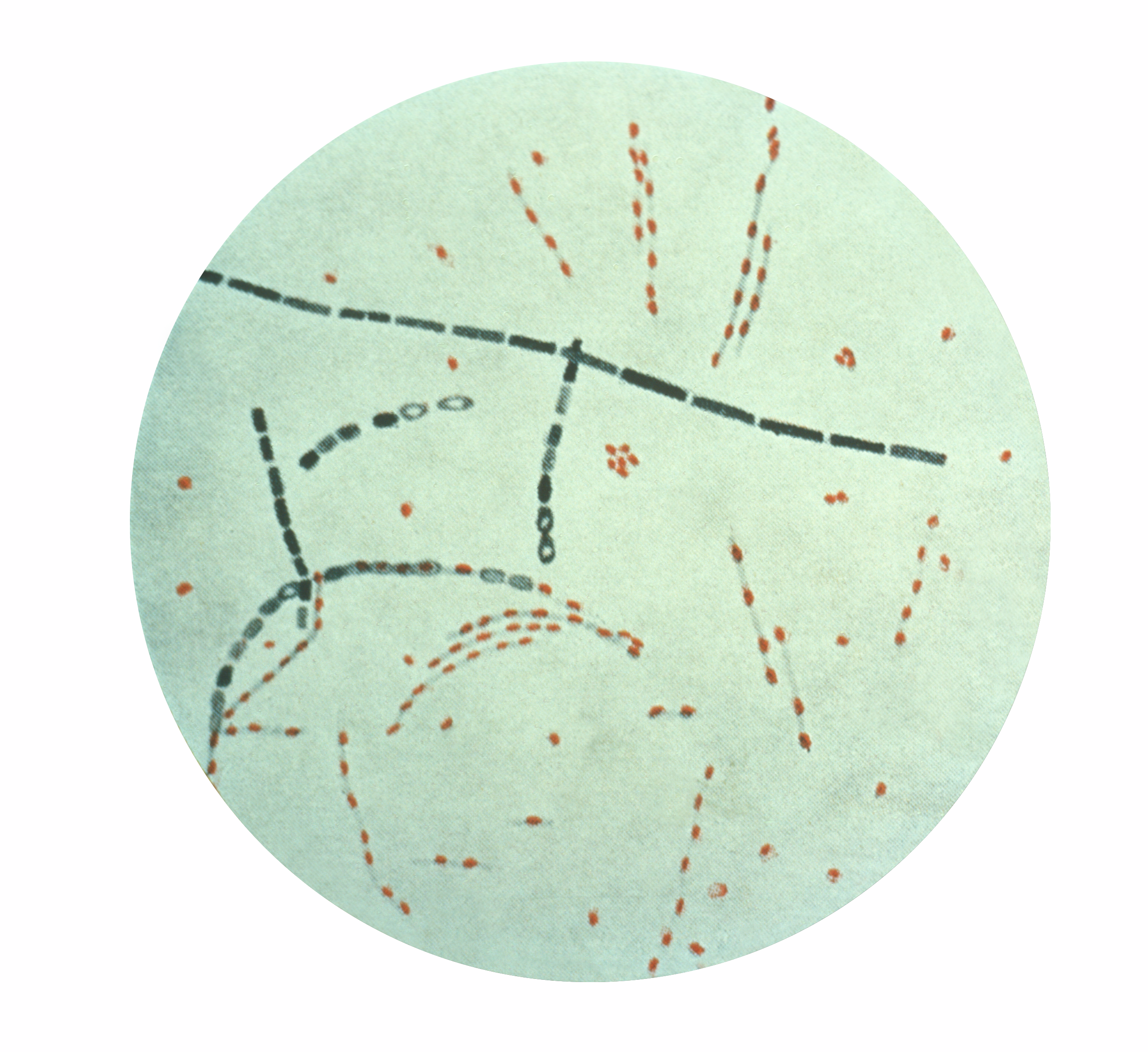
Anthrax spores can be released into the air, as with all other forms of matter

The 2001 anthrax attacks in the United States, also known as Amerithrax from its FBI case name, occurred over the course of several weeks beginning on September 18, 2001. Letters containing anthrax spores were mailed to several news media offices and two Democratic U.S. Senators, killing five people and infecting 17 others. As a response, the US increased countermeasure research funding and funding into the public health sector. Before the BioWatch program, the quickest method of detecting the presence of an infectious material was through the diagnosis of infected patients, however the most effective treatment takes place prior to infection or in its early stages. While the Central Intelligence Agency maintains that the use of bioterrorism in the United States is unlikely, the Biowatch program was created in 2001 in conjunction with the FBI, EPA, United States Department of Homeland Security and the US Laboratory Response Network for Bioterrorism, and was tested by the Centers for Disease Control and Prevention and Association of Public Health Laboratories. According to the DHS, the BioWatch program helps to provide "early warning of a mass pathogen release." The original 31 city program cost $60 million to implement, with a proposed expansion in 2005 to cost $118 million.

=== Reform Efforts ===
To remedy this, another program was created in 2003 that was meant to shorten the detection time to 6 hours and that could detect more than the six pathogens. After 11 years and $200 million spent on testing and development, however, the program was cancelled in 2014 because the new devices could not be made to work. For now, the 36-hour detection program continues, with maintenance costs of $80 million per year. The undersecretary for the science and technology at the Department of Homeland Security stated to Congress in February 2016 that his team was in an "exploratory process" phase for addressing the program's shortcomings, and that a solution was hoped for in 3–8 years.

== Instances of positive results ==
- On October 9, 2003, a BioWatch filter in Houston, Texas, detected "low levels of the bacterium that causes tularemia". Three consecutive days of positive results were recorded. Additional tests were taken, and the local area was watched for signs of infection among the population. While an investigation is still ongoing, Director of the Houston Department of Health and Human Services stated that "We are investigating to determine if the bacteria was always present or newly present and if it represents a health threat to the community."
- Small amounts of tularemia bacteria were again detected in BioWatch filters in the Mall area and elsewhere in Washington, DC, the morning after an anti-war demonstration on September 24, 2005. Biohazard sensors were triggered at six locations. While thousands of people were potentially exposed, no infections were reported.

== Response and criticism ==
The BioWatch system has received a mix of responses since coming online, many that result in waste of resources and a lowering public confidence in the system. A Congressional report in 2003 recorded that there was concern that the BioWatch filters would fail to detect indoor or underground releases, and also that the existence of BioWatch filters in some cities would direct terrorists to attack other cities without such protection. The report also highlighted the risk of the filters themselves being detected and destroyed. The report also states that, as EPA filters are located based on different policies than what would provide optimum locations for counter-bioterrorism sensors, the BioWatch filters may not be optimally located. Furthermore, the BioWatch system may miss releases that take place within the gaps in coverage. The House of Representatives also concluded that models used to predict the spread of an infectious agent after release and detection may be inaccurate.

The Congressional Report also raises concerns as to whether BioWatch can detect pathogens in large, polluted cities, as well as issues relating to the BioWatch filter reporting harmful pathogens that are actually within safe background levels, and thus would throw up more positive hits than actual investigation warrants. There are also concerns that the BioWatch filters kill whatever pathogen has set them off, thus removing the possibility of further tests being undertaken. Finally, concerns were raised in the Congressional Report regarding the sensitivity of the filters, and the fact that each filter would be exposed to different environmental conditions and thus a standardized detection rate would be near impossible to achieve. The complicated response that would be required should the BioWatch filter detect a pathogen would also be difficult to implement and put strain on local health authorities. Funding, policy and evaluation of effectiveness were all other areas of concern

In June 2013, Mike Walter, the manager of the Office of Health Affairs BioWatch Program, made a few remarks during his testimony to the House Committee on Energy and Commerce's Subcommittee on Oversight and Investigations. Walter said the benefits of the BioWatch Program give public health decision makers more time and more options to mitigate a bioterrorist event. He said that early detection is critical to the successful treatment of affected populations and provides public health decision makers more time – and thereby more options – in responding to, mitigating, and recovering from a bioterrorist event. If a bioagent is detected and assessed to be the result of an act of bioterrorism and/or a threat to public health, prophylactic treatment can be started prior to the widespread onset of symptoms resulting in more lives saved. He also talked about the federal, state and local partnership, tools for preparedness and is developing robust quality assurance, as well as assessing new technologies to shorten decision time in relation to bioagent detection.
