= National Defense Authorization Act for Fiscal Year 2009 =

United States federal law

Duncan Hunter National Defense Authorization Act for Fiscal Year 2009
- Long title: An Act To authorize appropriations for fiscal year 2009 for military activities of the Department of Defense, for military construction, and for defense activities of the Department of Energy, to prescribe military personnel strengths for such fiscal year, and for other purposes.
- Acronyms (colloquial): NDAA 2009
- Enacted by: the 110th United States Congress

Citations
- Public law: Pub. L. 110–417 (text) (PDF)

Legislative history
- Introduced in the Senate as S. 3001 by Carl Levin (D‑MI) on May 12, 2008; Passed the Senate on September 17, 2008 (88-8); Passed the House on September 24, 2008 (392-39) with amendment; Senate agreed to House amendment on September 27, 2008 (Unanimous consent); Signed into law by President George W. Bush on October 14, 2008; 17 years ago

The Duncan Hunter National Defense Authorization Act for Fiscal Year 2009, Public Law 110-417, was the United States federal law specifying the annual budget and expenditures of the U.S. Department of Defense for fiscal year 2009. It was so named to "[express] the sense of Congress that the Honorable Duncan Hunter, Representative from California, has discharged his official duties with integrity and distinction, [had] served the House of Representatives and the American people selflessly, and [deserved] the sincere gratitude of Congress and the Nation".

In this Act, Division A provided for Department of Defense authorizations, Division B provided for military construction authorizations; and Division C covered Department of Energy National Security Authorizations and other authorizations.

== Clean Contracting Act of 2008 ==
Title 8, Subtitle G: Governmentwide Acquisition Improvements, is known as the Clean Contracting Act of 2008 [sic], and focused on improvements to government procurement such as limiting the term of both civilian and defense non-competitive contracts to one year (section 862) and prohibiting excessive use by contractors of sub-contractors or "tiers of sub-contractors" (section 866). Section 864(d) required the Office of Management and Budget to report annually on the use of cost-reimbursement contracts by executive agencies. Reporting requirements for 2009 and 2010 were fulfilled in a letter dated 8 July 2011 sent to the Chairman of the Senate Committee on Homeland Security and Government Affairs, which reported that $163.13 billion were obligated in cost-reimbursement contracts in 2009 (including a proportion of "combination contracts" likely to have reflected a cost-reimbursement typology), along with $31.31 billion in time-and-materials contracts and labour-hour contracts which OMB noted as carrying a comparable risk to cost-reimbursement contracts.
