= List of bills in the 113th United States Congress =

The bills of the 113th United States Congress list includes proposed federal laws that were introduced in the 113th United States Congress. This Congress lasted from January 3, 2013, to January 3, 2015.

The United States Congress is the bicameral legislature of the federal government of the United States consisting of two houses: the lower house known as the House of Representatives and the upper house known as the Senate. The House and Senate are equal partners in the legislative process—legislation cannot be enacted without the consent of both chambers. The bills listed below are arranged on the basis of which chamber they were first introduced in, and then chronologically by date.

Once a bill is approved by one house, it is sent to the other which may pass, reject, or amend it. For the bill to become law, both houses must agree to identical versions of the bill. After passage by both houses, a bill is enrolled and sent to the president for signature or veto. Bills from the 113th Congress that have successfully completed this process become law and are listed as Acts of the 113th United States Congress.

== Introduced in the House of Representatives ==
=== Passed by the House, waiting in the Senate ===
H.R. number	Date of introduction	Short title	Description
H.R. 5	June 6, 2013	Student Success Act	To support State and local accountability for public education, protect State and local authority, inform parents of the performance of their children's schools, and for other purposes.
H.R. 10	April 1, 2014	Success and Opportunity through Quality Charter Schools Act	To amend the charter school program under the Elementary and Secondary Education Act of 1965.
H.R. 24	January 3, 2014	Federal Reserve Transparency Act of 2013	To require a full audit of the Board of Governors of the Federal Reserve System and the Federal reserve banks by the Comptroller General of the United States, and for other purposes.
H.R. 126	January 3, 2013	Corolla Wild Horses Protection Act	To direct the United States Secretary of the Interior to enter into an agreement to provide for management of the free-roaming wild horses in and around the Currituck National Wildlife Refuge.
H.R. 180	January 4, 2013	National Blue Alert Act of 2013	To encourage, enhance, and integrate Blue Alert plans throughout the United States in order to disseminate information when a law enforcement officer is seriously injured or killed in the line of duty.
H.R. 225	January 15, 2013	National Pediatric Research Network Act of 2013	To amend title IV of the Public Health Service Act to provide for a National Pediatric Research Network, including with respect to pediatric rare diseases or conditions.
H.R. 235	January 15, 2013	Veteran Emergency Medical Technician Support Act of 2013	To amend the Public Health Service Act to provide grants to States to streamline State requirements and procedures for veterans with military emergency medical training to become civilian emergency medical technicians.
H.R. 273	January 15, 2013	(No short title)	To eliminate the 2013 statutory pay adjustment for Federal employees.
H.R. 298	January 15, 2014	(No short title)	To direct the Secretary of the Interior to conduct a special resource study to evaluate the significance of the Mill Springs Battlefield located in Pulaski and Wayne Counties, Kentucky, and the feasibility of its inclusion in the National Park System, and for other purposes.
H.R. 338	January 22, 2013	Stop Tobacco Smuggling in the Territories Act of 2013	To amend title 18, United States Code, to include certain territories and possessions of the United States in the definition of State for the purposes of chapter 114, relating to trafficking in contraband cigarettes and smokeless tobacco.
H.R. 357	January 23, 2014	GI Bill Tuition Fairness Act of 2013	To amend title 38, United States Code, to require courses of education provided by public institutions of higher education that are approved for purposes of the educational assistance programs administered by the Secretary of Veterans Affairs to charge veterans tuition and fees at the in-State tuition rate.
H.R. 412	January 23, 2013	Nashua River Wild and Scenic River Study Act	To amend the Wild and Scenic Rivers Act to designate segments of the mainstem of the Nashua River and its tributaries in the Commonwealth of Massachusetts for study for potential addition to the National Wild and Scenic Rivers System, and for other purposes.
H.R. 503	February 5, 2014	National Desert Storm and Desert Shield War Memorial Act	To authorize the National Desert Storm Memorial Association to establish the National Desert Storm and Desert Shield Memorial as a commemorative work in the District of Columbia, and for other purposes.
H.R. 585	February 6, 2013	Anchorage Land Conveyance Act	To provide for the unencumbering of title to non-Federal land owned by the city of Anchorage, Alaska, for purposes of economic development by conveyance of the Federal reversion interest to the city. (See Title II)
H.R. 592	February 8, 2013	Federal Disaster Assistance Nonprofit Fairness Act of 2013	To amend the Robert T. Stafford Disaster Relief and Emergency Assistance Act to clarify that houses of worship are eligible for certain disaster relief and emergency assistance on terms equal to other eligible private nonprofit facilities, and for other purposes.
H.R. 627	February 13, 2013	National Park Service 100th Anniversary Commemorative Coin Act	To provide for the issuance of coins to commemorate the 100th anniversary of the establishment of the National Park Service, and for other purposes.
H.R. 634	February 13, 2013	Business Risk Mitigation and Price Stabilization Act of 2013	To provide end user exemptions from certain provisions of the Commodity Exchange Act and the Securities Exchange Act of 1934, and for other purposes.
H.R. 671	February 13, 2013	Ruth Moore Act of 2013	To amend title 38, United States Code, to improve the disability compensation evaluation procedure of the United States Secretary of Veterans Affairs for veterans with mental health conditions related to military sexual trauma, and for other purposes.
H.R. 723	February 14, 2013	Wood-Pawcatuck Watershed Protection Act	To amend the Wild and Scenic Rivers Act to designate a segment of the Beaver, Chipuxet, Queen, Wood, and Pawcatuck Rivers in the States of Connecticut and Rhode Island for study for potential addition to the National Wild and Scenic Rivers System, and for other purposes.
H.R. 863	February 27, 2013	Commission to Study the Potential Creation of a National Women's History Museum Act of 2013	To establish the commission to Study the Potential Creation of a National Women's History Museum, and for other purposes.
H.R. 885	February 28, 2013	San Antonio Missions National Historical Park Boundary Expansion Act of 2013	To expand the boundary of the San Antonio Missions National Historical Park, and for other purposes.
H.R. 930	February 28, 2014	New Philadelphia, Illinois, Study Act	To authorize the Secretary of the Interior to conduct a special resource study of the archeological site and surrounding land of the New Philadelphia town site in the State of Illinois, and for other purposes.
H.R. 992	March 6, 2013	Swaps Regulatory Improvement Act	To amend provisions in section 716 of the Dodd–Frank Wall Street Reform and Consumer Protection Act relating to Federal assistance for swaps entities.
H.R. 993	March 6, 2013	Fruit Height Lands Conveyance Act	To provide for the conveyance of certain parcels of National Forest System land to the city of Fruit Heights, Utah.
H.R. 1062	March 12, 2013	SEC Regulatory Accountability Act	To improve the consideration by the Securities and Exchange Commission of the costs and benefits of its regulations and orders.
H.R. 1095	March 12, 2013	TSA Loose Change Act	To amend title 49, United States Code, to direct the Assistant Secretary of Homeland Security (Transportation Security Administration) to transfer unclaimed money recovered at airport security checkpoints to nonprofit organizations that provide places of rest and recuperation at airports for members of the Armed Forces and their families, and for other purposes.

=== Bills ===
H.R. number	Date of introduction	Short title	Description
H.R. 6	March 6, 2014	Domestic Prosperity and Global Freedom Act	To provide for expedited approval of exportation of natural gas to World Trade Organization countries, and for other purposes.
H.R. 41	January 3, 2013	Hurricane Sandy relief bill	To temporarily increase the borrowing authority of the Federal Emergency Management Agency for carrying out the National Flood Insurance Program.
H.R. 45	January 3, 2013	(No short title)	To repeal the Patient Protection and Affordable Care Act and health care-related provisions in the Health Care and Education Reconciliation Act of 2010
H.R. 152	January 4, 2013	Disaster Relief Appropriations Act, 2013	Making supplemental appropriations for the fiscal year ending September 30, 2013, to improve and streamline disaster assistance for Hurricane Sandy, and for other purposes.
H.R. 235	January 15, 2013	Veteran Emergency Medical Technician Support Act of 2013	To amend the Public Health Service Act to provide grants to States to streamline State requirements and procedures for veterans with military emergency medical training to become civilian emergency medical technicians.
H.R. 251	January 15, 2013	South Utah Valley Electric Conveyance Act	To direct the United States Secretary of the Interior to convey certain Federal features of the electric distribution system to the South Utah Valley Electric Service District, and for other purposes.
H.R. 254	January 15, 2013	Bonneville Unit Clean Hydropower Facilitation Act	To authorize the Secretary of the Interior to facilitate the development of hydroelectric power on the Diamond Fork System of the Central Utah Project.
H.R. 258	January 15, 2013	Stolen Valor Act of 2013	To amend title 18, United States Code, with respect to fraudulent representations about having received military decorations or medals.
H.R. 267	January 15, 2013	Hydropower Regulatory Efficiency Act of 2013	To improve hydropower, and for other purposes. Amends the Public Utility Regulatory Policies Act of 1978 (PURPA) and the Federal Power Act.
H.R. 291	January 15, 2013	Black Hills Cemetery Act	To provide for the conveyance of certain cemeteries that are located on National Forest System land in Black Hills National Forest, South Dakota.
H.R. 297	January 15, 2013	Children's Hospital GME Support Reauthorization Act of 2013	To amend the Public Health Service Act to reauthorize support for graduate medical education programs in children's hospitals
H.R. 301	January 15, 2013	(No short title)	To provide for the establishment of the Special Envoy to Promote Religious Freedom of Religious Minorities in the Near East and South Central Asia
H.R. 307	January 18, 2013	Pandemic and All-Hazards Preparedness Reauthorization Act of 2013	To reauthorize certain programs under the Public Health Service Act and the Federal Food, Drug, and Cosmetic Act with respect to public health security and all-hazards preparedness and response, and for other purposes.
H.R. 311	January 18, 2013	Farmers Undertake Environmental Land Stewardship Act	To direct the Administrator of the Environmental Protection Agency to change the Spill Prevention, Control, and Countermeasure rule with respect to certain farms.
H.R. 316	January 18, 2013	Collinsville Renewable Energy Promotion Act	To reinstate and transfer certain hydroelectric licenses and extend the deadline for commencement of construction of certain hydroelectric projects.
H.R. 325	January 21, 2013	No Budget, No Pay Act of 2013 (Public Law 113–3)	To ensure the complete and timely payment of the obligations of the United States Government until May 19, 2013, and for other purposes.
H.R. 330	January 22, 2013	Distinguished Flying Cross National Memorial Act	To designate a Distinguished Flying Cross National Memorial at the March Field Air Museum in Riverside, California.
H.R. 356	January 23, 2013	Hill Creek Cultural Preservation and Energy Development Act	To clarify authority granted under the Act entitled "An Act to define the exterior boundary of the Uintah and Ouray Indian Reservation in the State of Utah" (62 Stat. 72), and for other purposes.
H.R. 357	January 23, 2014	GI Bill Tuition Fairness Act of 2013	To amend title 38, United States Code, to require courses of education provided by public institutions of higher education that are approved for purposes of the educational assistance programs administered by the Secretary of Veterans Affairs to charge veterans tuition and fees at the in-State tuition rate.
H.R. 360	January 23, 2013	(No short title)	To award posthumously a Congressional Gold Medal award to victims of the 16th Street Baptist Church bombing: Addie Mae Collins, Denise McNair, Carole Robertson, and Cynthia Wesley to commemorate the death of the 16th Street Baptist Church bombing during the Civil Rights Movement.
H.R. 384	January 23, 2013	Homes for Heroes Act of 2013	To establish the position of Special Assistant for Veterans Affairs in the Department of Housing and Urban Development, and for other purposes.
H.R. 499	February 5, 2013	Ending Federal Marijuana Prohibition Act of 2013	To decriminalize marijuana at the Federal level, to leave to the States a power to regulate marijuana that is similar to the power they have to regulate alcohol, and for other purposes.
H.R. 519	February 5, 2013	Uniting American Families Act of 2013	To amend the Immigration and Nationality Act to promote family unity, and for other purposes.
H.R. 573	February 6, 2013	(No short title)	To amend Public Law 93-435 with respect to the Northern Mariana Islands, providing parity with Guam, the Virgin Islands, and American Samoa.
H.R. 594	February 8, 2014	Paul D. Wellstone Muscular Dystrophy Community Assistance, Research and Education Amendments of 2013	To reauthorize and extend the Paul D. Wellstone Muscular Dystrophy Community Assistance, Research, and Education Amendments of 2008.
H.R. 623	February 12, 2013	Alaska Native Tribal Health Consortium Land Transfer Act	To provide for the conveyance of certain property located in Anchorage, Alaska, from the United States to the Alaska Native Tribal Health Consortium.
H.R. 657	February 13, 2013	Grazing Improvement Act	To amend the Federal Land Policy and Management Act of 1976 to improve the management of grazing leases and permits, and for other purposes. (See Title VIII)
H.R. 684	February 14, 2013	Marketplace Fairness Act of 2013	To restore States' sovereign rights to enforce State and local sales and use tax laws, and for other purposes.
H.R. 685	February 14, 2013	American Fighter Aces Congressional Gold Medal Act	To award a Congressional Gold Medal to the American Fighter Aces, collectively, in recognition of their heroic military service and defense of our country's freedom throughout the history of aviation warfare.
H.R. 687	February 14, 2013	Southeast Arizona Land Exchange and Conservation Act of 2013	To facilitate the efficient extraction of mineral resources in southeast Arizona by authorizing and directing an exchange of Federal and non-Federal land, and for other purposes.
H.R. 697	February 14, 2013	Three Kids Mine Remediation and Reclamation Act	To provide for the conveyance of certain Federal land in Clark County, Nevada, for the environmental remediation and reclamation of the Three Kids Mine Project Site, and for other purposes.
H.R. 701	February 14, 2013	(No short title)	To exempt a particular class of securities from the Securities and Exchange Act: To amend a provision of the Securities Act of 1933 directing the Securities and Exchange Commission to add a particular class of securities to those exempted under such Act to provide a deadline for such action
H.R. 717	February 14, 2013	Reuniting Families Act	To amend the Immigration and Nationality Act to promote family unity, and for other purposes.
H.R. 739	February 14, 2013	Chesapeake Bay Accountability and Recovery Act of 2013	To require the Office of Management and Budget to prepare a crosscut budget for restoration activities in the Chesapeake Bay watershed, to require the Environmental Protection Agency to develop and implement an adaptive management plan, and for other purposes. (See Title X)
H.R. 744	February 15, 2013	Stopping Tax Offenders and Prosecuting Identity Theft Act of 2013	To provide effective criminal prosecutions for certain identity thefts, and for other purposes.
H.R. 761	February 15, 2013	National Strategic and Critical Minerals Production Act of 2013	To require the Secretary of the Interior and the Secretary of Agriculture to more efficiently develop domestic sources of the minerals and mineral materials of strategic and critical importance to United States economic and national security and manufacturing competitiveness.
H.R. 767	February 15, 2013	(No short title)	To amend the Energy Policy Act of 2005 to modify the Pilot Project offices of the Federal Permit Streamlining Pilot Project
H.R. 803	February 25, 2013	Workforce Innovation and Opportunity Act	To reform and strengthen the workforce investment system of the Nation to put Americans back to work and make the United States more competitive in the 21st century.
H.R. 819	February 26, 2013	Preserving Access to Cape Hatteras National Seashore Recreation Area Act	To authorize pedestrian and motorized vehicular access in Cape Hatteras National Seashore Recreational Area, and for other purposes. (See Title V)
H.R. 908	February 28, 2013	Green Mountain Lookout Heritage Protection Act	To preserve the Green Mountain Lookout in the Glacier Peak Wilderness of the Mount Baker-Snoqualmie National Forest.
H.R. 933	March 4, 2013	Consolidated and Further Continuing Appropriations Act, 2013	Making consolidated appropriations and further continuing appropriations for the fiscal year ending September 30, 2013, and for other purposes.
H.R. 935	March 4, 2013	Reducing Regulatory Burdens Act of 2013	To amend the Federal Insecticide, Fungicide, and Rodenticide Act and the Federal Water Pollution Control Act to clarify Congressional intent regarding the regulation of the use of pesticides in or near navigable waters, and for other purposes.
H.R. 938	March 4, 2013	United States-Israel Strategic Partnership Act of 2013	To strengthen the strategic alliance between the United States and Israel.
H.R. 982	March 6, 2013	Furthering Asbestos Claim Transparency (FACT) Act of 2013	To amend title 11 of the United States Code to require the public disclosure by trusts established under section 524(g) of such title, of quarterly reports that contain detailed information regarding the receipt and disposition of claims for injuries based on exposure to asbestos; and for other purposes.
H.R. 1003	March 9, 2013	(No short title)	To improve consideration by the Commodity Futures Trading Commission of the costs and benefits of its regulations and orders
H.R. 1071	March 12, 2013	(No short title)	To specify the size of the precious-metal blanks that will be used in the production of the National Baseball Hall of Fame commemorative coins
H.R. 1098	March 12, 2013	Traumatic Brain Injury Reauthorization Act of 2013	To amend the Public Health Service Act to reauthorize certain programs relating to traumatic brain injury and to trauma research.
H.R. 1105	March 13, 2013	Small Business Capital Access and Job Preservation Act	To amend the Investment Advisers Act of 1940 to provide a registration exemption for private equity fund advisers, and for other purposes.
H.R. 1155	March 14, 2013	National Association of Registered Agents and Brokers Reform Act of 2013	To reform the National Association of Registered Agents and Brokers, and for other purposes.
H.R. 1157	March 14, 2013	Rattlesnake Mountain Public Access Act	To ensure public access to the summit of Rattlesnake Mountain in the Hanford Reach National Monument for educational, recreational, historical, scientific, cultural, and other purposes.
H.R. 1158	March 14, 2013	North Cascades National Park Service Complex Fish Stocking Act	To direct the United States Secretary of the Interior to continue stocking fish in certain lakes in the North Cascades National Park, Ross Lake National Recreation Area, and Lake Chelan National Recreation Area.
H.R. 1170	March 14, 2013	Fernley Economic Self-Determination Act	To direct the Secretary of the Interior, acting through the Bureau of Land Management and the Bureau of Reclamation, to convey, by quitclaim deed, to the City of Fernley, Nevada, all right, title, and interest of the United States, to any Federal land within that city that is under the jurisdiction of either of those agencies. (See Title III)
H.R. 1171	March 14, 2013	FOR VETS Act of 2013	To amend title 40, United States Code, to improve veterans service organizations access to Federal surplus personal property. Also called the "Formerly Owned Resources for Veterans to Express Thanks for Service Act of 2013"
H.R. 1204	March 14, 2013	Aviation Security Stakeholder Participation Act of 2013	To amend title 49, United States Code, to direct the Assistant Secretary of Homeland Security (Transportation Security Administration) to establish an Aviation Security Advisory Committee, and for other purposes.
H.R. 1206	March 14, 2013	Permanent Electronic Duck Stamp Act of 2013	To grant the United States Secretary of the Interior permanent authority to authorize States to issue electronic duck stamps, and for other purposes.
H.R. 1209	March 15, 2013	(No short title)	To award a Congressional Gold Medal to the World War II members of the "Doolittle Tokyo Raiders", for outstanding heroism, valor, skill, and service to the United States in conducting the bombings of Tokyo.
H.R. 1211	March 15, 2013	FOIA Oversight and Implementation Act of 2014	To amend section 552 of title 5, United States Code (commonly known as the Freedom of Information Act), to provide for greater public access to information, and for other purposes.
H.R. 1232	March 18, 2013	Federal Information Technology Acquisition Reform Act	To amend titles 40, 41, and 44, United States Code, to eliminate duplication and waste in information technology acquisition and management.
H.R. 1233	March 18, 2013	Presidential and Federal Records Act Amendments of 2014	To amend chapter 22 of title 44, United States Code, popularly known as the Presidential Records Act, to establish procedures for the consideration of claims of constitutionally based privilege against disclosure of Presidential records, and for other purposes.
H.R. 1281	March 20, 2013	Newborn Screening Saves Lives Reauthorization Act of 2013	To amend the Public Health Service Act to reauthorize programs under part A of title XI of such Act.
H.R. 1300	March 20, 2013	(No short title)	To amend the Fish and Wildlife Act of 1956 to reauthorize the volunteer programs and community partnerships for the benefit of national wildlife refuges.
H.R. 1341	March 21, 2013	Financial Competitive Act of 2013	To require the Financial Stability Oversight Council to conduct a study of the likely effects of the differences between the United States and other jurisdictions in implementing the derivatives credit valuation adjustment capital requirement.
H.R. 1402	March 25, 2013	Veterans Paralympic Act of 2013	To amend title 38, United States Code, to extend the authorization of appropriations for the United States Secretary of Veterans Affairs to pay a monthly assistance allowance to disabled veterans training or competing for the Paralympic Team and the authorization of appropriations for the Secretary of Veterans Affairs to provide assistance to United States Paralympics, Inc.
H.R. 1405	March 25, 2013	(No short title)	To amend title 38, United States Code, to require the Secretary of Veterans Affairs to include a notice of disagreement form in any notice of decision issued for the denial of a benefit sought, to improve the supervision of fiduciaries of veterans under the laws administered by the Secretary of Veterans Affairs, and for other purposes.
H.R. 1406	April 9, 2013	Working Families Flexibility Act of 2013	To amend the Fair Labor Standards Act of 1938 to allow employees to choose paid time off, accrued at time and a half, in lieu of overtime.
H.R. 1410	April 9, 2013	Keep the Promise Act of 2013	To prohibit gaming activities on certain Indian lands in Arizona until the expiration of certain gaming compacts.
H.R. 1411	April 9, 2013	California Coastal National Monument Expansion Act of 2013	To include the Point Arena-Stornetta Public Lands in the California Coastal National Monument as a part of the National Landscape Conservation System, and for other purposes.
H.R. 1423	April 9, 2013	Taxpayers Right-To-Know Act	To provide taxpayers with an annual report disclosing the cost and performance of Government programs and areas of duplication among them, and for other purposes.
H.R. 1447	April 9, 2013	Death in Custody Reporting Act of 2013	To encourage States to report to the Attorney General certain information regarding the deaths of individuals in the custody of law enforcement agencies, and for other purposes.
H.R. 1459	April 10, 2013	Ensuring Public Involvement in the Creation of National Monuments Act	To ensure that the National Environmental Policy Act of 1969 applies to the declaration of national monuments, and for other purposes.
H.R. 1501	April 11, 2013	Prison Ship Martyrs' Monument Preservation Act	To direct the Secretary of the Interior to study the suitability and feasibility of designating the Prison Ship Martyrs' Monument in Fort Greene Park, in the New York City borough of Brooklyn, as a unit of the National Park System.
H.R. 1526	April 12, 2013	Restoring Healthy Forests for Healthy Communities Act	To restore employment and educational opportunities in, and improve the economic stability of, counties containing National Forest System land, while also reducing Forest Service management costs, by ensuring that such counties have a dependable source of revenue from National Forest System land, to provide a temporary extension of the Secure Rural Schools and Community Self-Determination Act of 2000, and for other purposes.
H.R. 1528	April 12, 2013	Veterinary Medicine Mobility Act of 2014	To amend the Controlled Substances Act to allow a veterinarian to transport and dispense controlled substances in the usual course of veterinary practice outside of the registered location.
H.R. 1542	April 12, 2013	WMD Intelligence and Information Sharing Act of 2013	To amend the Homeland Security Act of 2002 to establish weapons of mass destruction intelligence and information sharing functions of the Office of Intelligence and Analysis of the Department of Homeland Security and to require dissemination of information analyzed by the department to entities with responsibilities relating to homeland security, and for other purposes.
H.R. 1564	April 15, 2013	Audit Integrity and Job Protection Act	To amend the Sarbanes-Oxley Act of 2002 to prohibit the Public Company Accounting Oversight Board from requiring public companies to use specific auditors or require the use of different auditors on a rotating basis
H.R. 1580	April 16, 2013	(No short title)	To affirm the policy of the United States regarding Internet governance
H.R. 1584	April 16, 2013	Energy Consumers Relief Act of 2013	To protect consumers by prohibiting the Administrator of the Environmental Protection Agency from promulgating as final certain energy-related rules that are estimated to cost more than $1 billion and will cause significant adverse effects to the economy.
H.R. 1613	April 18, 2013	Outer Continental Shelf Transboundary Hydrocarbon Agreements Authorization Act	To amend the Outer Continental Shelf Lands Act to provide for the proper Federal management and oversight of transboundary hydrocarbon reservoirs, and for other purposes.
H.R. 1679	April 23, 2013	(No short title)	To amend the Expedited Funds Availability Act to clarify the application of that Act to American Samoa and the Northern Mariana Islands.
H.R. 1684	April 23, 2013	Ranch A Consolidation and Management Improvement Act	To convey certain property to the State of Wyoming to consolidate the historic Ranch A, and for other purposes.
H.R. 1726	April 25, 2013	(No short title)	To award a Congressional Gold Medal to the 65th Infantry Regiment, known as the Borinqueneers.
H.R. 1742	April 25, 2013	Vulnerable Veterans Housing Reform Act of 2013	To exclude from consideration as income under the United States Housing Act of 1937 payments of pension made under section 1521 of title 38, United States Code, to veterans who are in need of regular aid and attendance, and for other purposes.
H.R. 1755	April 25, 2013	Employment Non-Discrimination Act of 2013	To prohibit employment discrimination on the basis of sexual orientation or gender identity.
H.R. 1771	April 26, 2013	North Korea Sanctions Enforcement Act of 2013	To improve the enforcement of sanctions against the Government of North Korea, and for other purposes.
H.R. 1786	April 26, 2013	National Windstorm Impact Reduction Act Reauthorization of 2014	To reauthorize the National Windstorm Impact Reduction Program, and for other purposes.
H.R. 1814	April 29, 2013	Equitable Access to Care and Health Act	To amend section 5000A of the Internal Revenue Code of 1986 to provide an additional religious exemption from the individual health coverage mandate.
H.R. 1848	May 7, 2013	Small Airplane Revitalization Act of 2013	To ensure that the Federal Aviation Administration advances the safety of small airplanes, and the continued development of the general aviation industry, and for other purposes.
H.R. 1862	May 7, 2013	Capital Access for Small Community Financial Institutions Act	To amend the Federal Home Loan Bank Act to allow non-Federally insured credit unions to become members of a Federal Home Loan Bank.
H.R. 1864	May 7, 2013	(No short title)	To amend title 10, United States Code, to require an Inspector General investigation of allegations of retaliatory personnel actions taken in response to making protected communications regarding sexual assault
H.R. 1871	May 8, 2014	Baseline Reform Act of 2013	To amend the Balanced Budget and Emergency Deficit Control Act of 1985 to reform the budget baseline.
H.R. 1872	May 8, 2014	Budget and Accounting Transparency Act of 2014	To amend the Balanced Budget and Emergency Deficit Control Act of 1985 to increase transparency in Federal budgeting, and for other purposes.
H.R. 1874	May 8, 2013	Pro-Growth Budgeting Act of 2013	To amend the Congressional Budget Act of 1974 to provide for macroeconomic analysis of the impact of legislation
H.R. 1891	May 8, 2013	Science Laureates of the United States Act of 2013	To establish a position of Science Laureate of the United States.
H.R. 1900	May 9, 2013	Natural Gas Pipeline Permitting Reform Act	To provide for the timely consideration of all licenses, permits, and approvals required under Federal law with respect to the siting, construction, expansion, or operation of any natural gas pipeline projects.
H.R. 1947	May 13, 2013	Federal Agriculture Reform and Risk Management Act of 2013 (H.R. 1947; 113th Congress)	To provide for the reform and continuation of agricultural and other programs of the Department of Agriculture through fiscal year 2018, and for other purposes. Popularly referred to as "the farm bill" or "the House farm bill."
H.R. 1961	May 14, 2013	(No short title)	To amend title 46, United States Code, to extend the exemption from the fire-retardant materials construction requirement for vessels operating within the Boundary Line (H.R. 1961; 113th Congress)
H.R. 1965	May 14, 2013	Federal Lands Jobs and Energy Security Act	To streamline and ensure onshore energy permitting, provide for onshore leasing certainty, and give certainty to oil shale development for American energy security, economic development, and job creation, and for other purposes.
H.R. 2011	May 16, 2013	Veterans' Advisory Committee on Education Improvement Act of 2013	To amend title 38, United States Code, to provide for a two-year extension of the Veterans' Advisory Committee on Education.
H.R. 2019	May 16, 2013	Gabriella Miller Kids First Research Act	To eliminate taxpayer financing of presidential campaigns and party conventions and reprogram savings to provide for a 10-year pediatric research initiative through the Common Fund administered by the National Institutes of Health, and for other purposes.
H.R. 2046	May 17, 2013	Recreational Lands Self-Defense Act of 2013	To protect the right of individuals to bear arms at water resources development projects administered by the Secretary of the Army, and for other purposes. (See Title VI)
H.R. 2052	May 20, 2013	Global Investment in American Jobs Act of 2013	To direct the Secretary of Commerce, in coordination with the heads of other relevant Federal departments and agencies, to conduct an interagency review of and report to Congress on ways to increase the global competitiveness of the United States in attracting foreign direct investment.
H.R. 2061	May 22, 2013	Digital Accountability and Transparency Act of 2013	To expand the Federal Funding Accountability and Transparency Act of 2006 to increase accountability and transparency in Federal spending, and for other purposes.
H.R. 2072	May 21, 2013	Demanding Accountability for Veterans Act of 2013	To amend title 38, United States Code, to improve the accountability of the Secretary of Veterans Affairs to the Inspector General of the Department of Veterans Affairs.
H.R. 2083	May 22, 2013	Protecting Students from Sexual and Violent Predators Act	To amend the Elementary and Secondary Education Act of 1965 to require criminal background checks for school employees.
H.R. 2095	May 22, 2013	Land Disposal Transparency and Efficiency Act	To prohibit an increase in the lands administered by the Bureau of Land Management until a centralized database of all lands identified as suitable for disposal by Resource Management Plans for lands under the administrative jurisdiction of the Bureau is easily accessible to the public on a website of the Bureau. (See Title IV)
H.R. 2126	May 23, 2013	Better Buildings Act of 2014	To facilitate better alignment, cooperation, and best practices between commercial real estate landlords and tenants regarding energy efficiency in buildings, and for other purposes.
H.R. 2166	May 23, 2013	Good Samaritan Search and Recovery Act of 2013	To direct the Secretary of the Interior and Secretary of Agriculture to expedite access to certain Federal lands under the administrative jurisdiction of each Secretary for good Samaritan search-and-recovery missions, and for other purposes.
H.R. 2189	May 23, 2013	(No short title)	To establish a commission or task force to evaluate the backlog of disability claims of the Department of Veterans Affairs
H.R. 2197	May 23, 2013	York River Wild and Scenic River Study Act of 2013	To amend the Wild and Scenic Rivers Act to designate segments of the York River and associated tributaries for study for potential inclusion in the National Wild and Scenic Rivers System.
H.R. 2203	May 23, 2013	(No short title)	To provide for the award of a gold medal on behalf of Congress to Jack Nicklaus, in recognition of his service to the Nation in promoting excellence, good sportsmanship, and philanthropy.
H.R. 2216	May 28, 2013	Military Construction and Veterans Affairs, and Related Agencies Appropriations Act, 2014	Making appropriations for military construction, the United States Department of Veterans Affairs, and related agencies for the fiscal year ending September 30, 2014, and for other purposes.
H.R. 2217	May 29, 2013	Department of Homeland Security Appropriations Act, 2014	A bill making appropriations for the United States Department of Homeland Security for the fiscal year ending September 30, 2014, and for other purposes.
H.R. 2231	June 4, 2013	Offshore Energy and Jobs Act	To amend the Outer Continental Shelf Lands Act to increase energy exploration and production on the Outer Continental Shelf, provide for equitable revenue sharing for all coastal States, implement the reorganization of the functions of the former Minerals Management Service into distinct and separate agencies, and for other purposes.
H.R. 2259	June 5, 2013	North Fork Watershed Protection Act of 2013	To withdraw certain Federal land and interests in that land from location, entry, and patent under the mining laws and disposition under the mineral and geothermal leasing laws and to preserve existing uses.
H.R. 2279	June 6, 2013	Reducing Excessive Deadline Obligations Act of 2013	To amend the Solid Waste Disposal Act relating to review of regulations under such Act and to amend the Comprehensive Environmental Response, Compensation, and Liability Act of 1980 relating to financial responsibility for classes of facilities.
H.R. 2289	June 6, 2013	(No short title)	To rename section 219(c) of the Internal Revenue Code of 1986 as the Kay Bailey Hutchison Spousal IRA
H.R. 2337	June 12, 2013	Lake Hill Administrative Site Affordable Housing Act	To provide for the conveyance of the Forest Service Lake Hill Administrative Site in Summit County, Colorado.
H.R. 2374	June 14, 2013	Retail Investor Protection Act	To amend the Securities Exchange Act of 1934 to provide protections for retail customers, and for other purposes.
H.R. 2388	June 14, 2013	(No short title)	To authorize the Secretary of the Interior to take certain Federal lands located in El Dorado County, California, into trust for the benefit of the Shingle Springs Band of Miwok Indians, and for other purposes.
H.R. 2413	June 18, 2013	Weather Forecasting Improvement Act of 2013	To prioritize and redirect NOAA resources to a focused program of investment on near-term, affordable, and attainable advances in observational, computing, and modeling capabilities to deliver substantial improvement in weather forecasting and prediction of high impact weather events, such as tornadoes and hurricanes, and for other purposes.
H.R. 2431	June 19, 2013	National Integrated Drought Information System Reauthorization Act of 2013	To reauthorize the National Integrated Drought Information System.
H.R. 2449	June 20, 2013	(No short title)	To authorize the President to extend the term of the Agreement for Cooperation between the Government of the United States of America and the Government of the Republic of Korea Concerning Civil Uses of Nuclear Energy for a period not to exceed March 19, 2016.
H.R. 2481	June 25, 2013	Veterans Economic Opportunity Act of 2013	To amend title 38, United States Code, to codify and improve the election requirements for the receipt of educational assistance under the Post-9/11 Educational Assistance program of the Department of Veterans Affairs.
H.R. 2495	June 25, 2013	American Super Computing Leadership Act	To amend the Department of Energy High-End Computing Revitalization Act of 2004 to improve the high-end computing research and development program of the Department of Energy, and for other purposes.
H.R. 2527	June 26, 2014	(No short title)	To amend title 38, United States Code, to provide veterans with counseling and treatment for sexual trauma that occurred during inactive duty training
H.R. 2548	June 27, 2013	Electrify Africa Act of 2013	To establish a comprehensive United States Government policy to assist countries in sub-Saharan Africa to develop an appropriate mix of power solutions for more broadly distributed electricity access in order to support poverty alleviation and drive economic growth, and for other purposes.
H.R. 2575	June 28, 2013	Save American Workers Act of 2013	To amend the Internal Revenue Code of 1986 to repeal the 30-hour threshold for classification as a full-time employee for purposes of the employer mandate in the Patient Protection and Affordable Care Act and replace it with 40 hours.
H.R. 2576	June 28, 2013	(No short title)	To amend title 49, United States Code, to modify requirements relating to the availability of pipeline safety regulatory documents
H.R. 2600	June 28, 2013	(No short title)	To amend the Interstate Land Sales Full Disclosure Act to clarify how the Act applies to condominiums
H.R. 2609	July 2, 2013	Energy and Water Development and Related Agencies Appropriations Act, 2014	Making appropriations for energy and water development and related agencies for the fiscal year ending September 30, 2014, and for other purposes.
H.R. 2611	July 8, 2013	(No short title)	To designate the headquarters building of the Coast Guard on the campus located at 2701 Martin Luther King, Jr., Avenue Southeast in the District of Columbia as the "Douglas A. Munro Coast Guard Headquarters Building", and for other purposes.
H.R. 2640	July 10, 2013	Central Oregon Jobs and Water Security Act	To amend the Wild and Scenic Rivers Act to adjust the Crooked River boundary, to provide water certainty for the City of Prineville, Oregon, and for other purposes.
H.R. 2641	July 10, 2013	Responsibly And Professionally Invigorating Development Act of 2013	To provide for improved coordination of agency actions in the preparation and adoption of environmental documents for permitting determinations, and for other purposes.
H.R. 2642	July 10, 2013	Agriculture Act of 2014	To provide for the reform and continuation of agricultural and other programs of the Department of Agriculture through fiscal year 2018, and for other purposes.
H.R. 2655	July 11, 2013	Lawsuit Abuse Reduction Act of 2013	To amend Rule 11 of the Federal Rules of Civil Procedure to improve attorney accountability, and for other purposes.
H.R. 2667	July 11, 2013	Authority for Mandate Delay Act	To delay the application of the employer health insurance mandate, and for other purposes. (Modifies deadlines in the Patient Protection and Affordable Care Act)
H.R. 2668	July 11, 2013	Fairness for American Families Act	To delay the application of the individual health insurance mandate. (Modifies deadlines in the Patient Protection and Affordable Care Act)
H.R. 2672	July 11, 2013	CFPB Rural Designation Petition and Correction Act	To amend the Dodd-Frank Wall Street Reform and Consumer Protection Act to provide for an application process for interested parties to apply for a county to be designated as a rural area, and for other purposes.
H.R. 2719	July 18, 2013	Transportation Security Acquisition Reform Act	To require the Transportation Security Administration to implement best practices and improve transparency with regard to technology acquisition programs, and for other purposes.
H.R. 2728	July 18, 2013	Protecting States' Rights to Promote American Energy Security Act	To recognize States' authority to regulate oil and gas operations and promote American energy security, development, and job creation.
H.R. 2747	July 19, 2013	Streamlining Claims Processing for Federal Contractor Employees Act	To amend title 40, United States Code, to transfer certain functions from the Government Accountability Office to the Department of Labor relating to the processing of claims for the payment of workers who were not paid appropriate wages under certain provisions of such title.
H.R. 2775	July 22, 2013	No Subsidies Without Verification Act	To condition the provision of premium and cost-sharing subsidies under the Patient Protection and Affordable Care Act upon a certification that a program to verify household income and other qualifications for such subsidies is operational, and for other purposes.
H.R. 2799	July 23, 2013	SHARE Act	To establish the Wildlife and Hunting Heritage Conservation Council Advisory Committee to advise the Secretaries of the Interior and Agriculture on wildlife and habitat conservation, hunting, recreational shooting, and for other purposes. (See Title VII)
H.R. 2818	July 24, 2013	Surveillance State Repeal Act	To repeals the USA PATRIOT Act and the FISA Amendments Act of 2008, prohibits information relating to a U.S. person from being acquired pursuant to FISA without a valid warrant based on probable cause, and for other purposes.
H.R. 2824	July 25, 2013	Preventing Government Waste and Protecting Coal Mining Jobs in America	To amend the Surface Mining Control and Reclamation Act of 1977 to stop the ongoing waste by the United States Department of the Interior of taxpayer resources and implement the final rule on excess spoil, mining waste, and buffers for perennial and intermittent streams, and for other purposes.
H.R. 2844	July 26, 2013	Federal Communications Commission Consolidated Reporting Act of 2013	To amend the Communications Act of 1934 to consolidate the reporting obligations of the Federal Communications Commission in order to improve congressional oversight and reduce reporting burdens.
H.R. 2848	July 30, 2013	Department of State Operations and Embassy Security Authorization Act, Fiscal Year 2014	To authorize appropriations for the Department of State for fiscal year 2014, and for other purposes.
H.R. 2871	July 31, 2013	(No short title)	To amend title 28, United States Code, to modify the composition of the southern judicial district of Mississippi to improve judicial efficiency, and for other purposes.
H.R. 2919	August 1, 2013	Open Book on Equal Access to Justice Act	To amend titles 5 and 28, United States Code, to require annual reports to Congress on, and the maintenance of databases on, awards of fees and other expenses to prevailing parties in certain administrative proceedings and court cases to which the United States is a party, and for other purposes.
H.R. 2939	August 1, 2013	(No short title)	To award the Congressional Gold Medal to Shimon Peres.
H.R. 2942	August 1, 2013	(No short title)	To amend title 38, United States Code, to reestablish the Professional Certification and Licensure Advisory Committee of the Department of Veterans Affairs
H.R. 2952	August 1, 2013	Critical Infrastructure Research and Development Advancement Act of 2013	To amend the Homeland Security Act of 2002 to make certain improvements in the laws relating to the advancement of security technologies for critical infrastructure protection, and for other purposes.
H.R. 2954	August 1, 2013	Public Access and Lands Improvement Act	To authorize Escambia County, Florida, to convey certain property that was formerly part of Santa Rosa Island National Monument and that was conveyed to Escambia County subject to restrictions on use and reconveyance. (See Title I)
H.R. 2996	August 2, 2013	Revitalize American Manufacturing and Innovation Act of 2013	To require the Secretary of Commerce to establish the Network for Manufacturing Innovation and for other purposes.
H.R. 3008	August 2, 2013	(No short title)	To provide for the conveyance of a small parcel of National Forest System land in Los Padres National Forest in California, and for other purposes. (Transfers the land to the White Lotus Foundation)
H.R. 3080	September 11, 2013	Water Resources Reform and Development Act of 2013	To provide for improvements to the rivers and harbors of the United States, to provide for the conservation and development of water and related resources, and for other purposes.
H.R. 3086	September 12, 2013	Permanent Internet Tax Freedom Act	To permanently extend the Internet Tax Freedom Act.
H.R. 3092	September 12, 2013	Missing Children's Assistance Reauthorization Act of 2013	To amend the Missing Children's Assistance Act, and for other purposes.
H.R. 3095	September 12, 2013	Public Law 113-45	To ensure that any new or revised requirement providing for the screening, testing, or treatment of individuals operating commercial motor vehicles for sleep disorders is adopted pursuant to a rulemaking proceeding, and for other purposes.
H.R. 3107	September 17, 2013	Homeland Security Cybersecurity Boots-on-the-Ground Act	To require the Secretary of Homeland Security to establish cybersecurity occupation classifications, assess the cybersecurity workforce, develop a strategy to address identified gaps in the cybersecurity workforce, and for other purposes.
H.R. 3109	September 17, 2013	(No short title)	To amend the Migratory Bird Treaty Act to exempt certain Alaskan Native articles from prohibitions against sale of items containing nonedible migratory bird parts
H.R. 3110	September 17, 2014	Huna Tlingit Traditional Gull Egg Use Act	To allow for the harvest of gull eggs by the Huna Tlingit people within Glacier Bay National Park in the State of Alaska.
H.R. 3121	September 18, 2013	American Health Care Reform Act of 2013	Repeals the Patient Protection and Affordable Care Act and the health care provisions of the Health Care and Education and Reconciliation Act of 2010, effective as of their enactment. Restores or revives provisions amended or repealed by such Act or such health care provisions.
H.R. 3174	September 25, 2013	(No short title)	To authorize the Secretary of Transportation to obligate funds for emergency relief projects arising from damage caused by severe weather events in 2013, and for other purposes.
H.R. 3188	September 26, 2013	Yosemite Rim Fire Emergency Salvage Act	To expedite the planning and implementation of salvage timber sales as part of Forest Service and Department of the Interior restoration and rehabilitation activities for lands within the Stanislaus National Forest and Yosemite National Park and Bureau of Land Management lands adversely impacted by the 2013 Rim Fire in California. (See Title IX)
H.R. 3189	September 26, 2013	Water Rights Protection Act	To prohibit the conditioning of any permit, lease, or other use agreement on the transfer, relinquishment, or other impairment of any water right to the United States by the Secretaries of the Interior and Agriculture.
H.R. 3190	September 26, 2013	United States Parole Commission Extension Act of 2013	To provide for the continued performance of the functions of the United States Parole Commission, and for other purposes.
H.R. 3193	September 26, 2013	Consumer Financial Protection Safety and Soundness Improvement Act of 2013	To amend the Consumer Financial Protection Act of 2010 to strengthen the review authority of the Financial Stability Oversight Council of regulations issued by the Bureau of Consumer Financial Protection, and for other purposes.
H.R. 3202	September 27, 2013	Essential Transportation Worker Identification Credential Assessment Act	To require the Secretary of Homeland Security to prepare a comprehensive security assessment of the transportation security card program, and for other purposes.
H.R. 3204	September 27, 2013	Drug Quality and Security Act	To amend the Federal Food, Drug, and Cosmetic Act with respect to human drug compounding and drug supply chain security, and for other purposes.
H.R. 3205	September 27, 2013	Promoting Adoption and Legal Guardianship for Children in Foster Care Act	To reauthorize and restructure the adoption incentives grant program, and for other purposes.
H.R. 3210	September 28, 2013	Pay Our Military Act	Making continuing appropriations for military pay in the event of a Government shutdown.
H.R. 3211	September 28, 2013	Mortgage Choice Act of 2013	To amend the Truth in Lending Act to improve upon the definitions provided for points and fees in connection with a mortgage transaction.
H.R. 3230	October 2, 2013	Pay Our Guard and Reserve Act later became the Veterans' Access to Care through Choice, Accountability, and Transparency Act of 2014	Originally: Making continuing appropriations during a Government shutdown to provide pay and allowances to members of the reserve components of the Armed Forces who perform inactive-duty training during such period. Later: To improve the access of veterans to medical services from the Department of Veterans Affairs, and for other purposes.
H.R. 3301	October 22, 2013	North American Energy Infrastructure Act	To require approval for the construction, connection, operation, or maintenance of oil or natural gas pipelines or electric transmission facilities at the national boundary of the United States for the import or export of oil, natural gas, or electricity to or from Canada or Mexico, and for other purposes.
H.R. 3304	October 22, 2013	National Defense Authorization Act for Fiscal Year 2014	To authorize appropriations for fiscal year 2014 for military activities of the Department of Defense, for military construction, and for defense activities of the Department of Energy, to prescribe military personnel strengths for such fiscal year, and for other purposes.
H.R. 3309	October 23, 2013	Innovation Act	To amend title 35, United States Code, and the Leahy-Smith America Invents Act to make improvements and technical corrections, and for other purposes. (Aims to reduce the problem of frivolous patent infringement lawsuits by patent trolls.)
H.R. 3329	October 23, 2013	(No short title)	To enhance the ability of community financial institutions to foster economic growth and serve their communities, boost small businesses, increase individual savings, and for other purposes.
H.R. 3343	October 28, 2013	(No short title)	To amend the District of Columbia Home Rule Act to clarify the rules regarding the determination of the compensation of the Chief Financial Officer of the District of Columbia.
H.R. 3350	October 28, 2013	Keep Your Health Plan Act of 2013	To authorize health insurance issuers to continue to offer for sale current individual health insurance coverage in satisfaction of the minimum essential health insurance coverage requirement, and for other purposes.
H.R. 3361	October 29, 2013	USA Freedom Act	To reform the authorities of the Federal Government to require the production of certain business records, conduct electronic surveillance, use pen registers and trap and trace devices, and use other forms of information gathering for foreign intelligence, counterterrorism, and criminal purposes, and for other purposes.
H.R. 3362	October 29, 2013	Exchange Information Disclosure Act	To amend the Patient Protection and Affordable Care Act to require transparency in the operation of American Health Benefit Exchanges.
H.R. 3366	October 29, 2013	Hermiston Reversionary Interest Release Act	To provide for the release of the property interests retained by the United States in certain land conveyed in 1954 by the United States, acting through the Director of the Bureau of Land Management, to the State of Oregon for the establishment of the Hermiston Agricultural Research and Extension Center of Oregon State University in Hermiston, Oregon.
H.R. 3370	October 29, 2013	Homeowner Flood Insurance Affordability Act of 2013	To delay the implementation of certain provisions of the Biggert–Waters Flood Insurance Reform Act of 2012, and for other purposes.
H.R. 3374	October 29, 2013	American Savings Promotion Act	To provide for the use of savings promotion raffle products by financial institutions to encourage savings, and for other purposes.
H.R. 3393	October 30, 2013	Student and Family Tax Simplification Act	To amend the Internal Revenue Code of 1986 to consolidate certain tax benefits for educational expenses, and for other purposes.
H.R. 3448	November 12, 2013	Small Cap Liquidity Reform Act of 2013	To amend the Securities Exchange Act of 1934 to provide for an optional pilot program allowing certain emerging growth companies to increase the tick sizes of their stocks.
H.R. 3468	November 13, 2013	Credit Union Share Insurance Fund Parity Act	To amend the Federal Credit Union Act to extend insurance coverage to amounts held in a member account on behalf of another person, and for other purposes.
H.R. 3470	November 13, 2013	Taiwan Relations Act Affirmation and Naval Vessel Transfer Act of 2014	To provide for the transfer of naval vessels to certain foreign countries, and for other purposes.
H.R. 3474	November 13, 2013	Hire More Heroes Act of 2013	To amend the Internal Revenue Code of 1986 to allow employers to exempt employees with health coverage under TRICARE or the Veterans Administration from being taken into account for purposes of the employer mandate under the Patient Protection and Affordable Care Act.
H.R. 3487	November 14, 2013	(No short title)	To amend the Federal Election Campaign Act to extend through 2018 the authority of the Federal Election Commission to impose civil money penalties on the basis of a schedule of penalties established and published by the commission, to expand such authority to certain other violations, and for other purposes.
H.R. 3488	November 14, 2013	Preclearance Authorization Act of 2014	To establish the conditions under which the United States Secretary of Homeland Security may establish preclearance facilities, conduct preclearance operations, and provide customs services outside the United States, and for other purposes.
H.R. 3492	November 14, 2013	River Paddling Protection Act	To provide for the use of hand-propelled vessels in Yellowstone National Park, Grand Teton National Park, and the National Elk Refuge, and for other purposes.
H.R. 3522	November 18, 2013	Employee Health Care Protection Act of 2013	To authorize health insurance issuers to continue to offer for sale current group health insurance coverage in satisfaction of the minimum essential health insurance coverage requirement, and for other purposes.
H.R. 3530	November 19, 2013	Justice for Victims of Trafficking Act of 2013	To provide justice for the victims of trafficking.
H.R. 3547	November 20, 2013	The Space Launch Liability Indemnification Extension Act and the Consolidated Appropriations Act, 2014	The Space Launch Liability Indemnification Extension Act ("To extend the application of certain space launch liability provisions through 2014.") was amended to become the Consolidated Appropriations Act, 2014 (which did include the original bill in section 8).
H.R. 3548	November 20, 2013	Improving Trauma Care Act of 2014	To amend title XII of the Public Health Service Act to expand the definition of trauma to include thermal, electrical, chemical, radioactive, and other extrinsic agents.
H.R. 3578	November 21, 2013	H.R. 3578 (No short title)	To ensure that any new or revised requirement providing for the screening, testing, or treatment of an airman or an air traffic controller for a sleep disorder is adopted pursuant to a rulemaking proceeding
H.R. 3584	November 21, 2013	(No short title)	To amend the Federal Home Loan Bank Act to authorize privately insured credit unions to become members of a Federal home loan bank, and for other purposes
H.R. 3588	November 21, 2013	Community Fire Safety Act of 2013	To amend the Safe Drinking Water Act to exempt fire hydrants from the prohibition on the use of lead pipes, fittings, fixtures, solder, and flux.
H.R. 3590	November 21, 2013	Sportsmen's Heritage And Recreational Enhancement Act of 2013	To protect and enhance opportunities for recreational hunting, fishing, and shooting, and for other purposes.
H.R. 3610	November 21, 2013	Stop Exploitation Through Trafficking Act of 2013	To stop exploitation through trafficking.
H.R. 3626	December 2, 2013	(No short title)	To extend the Undetectable Firearms Act of 1988 for 10 years
H.R. 3627	December 2, 2014	Kilah Davenport Child Protection Act of 2013	To require the Attorney General to report on State law penalties for certain child abusers, and for other purposes.
H.R. 3658	December 5, 2013	Monuments Men Recognition Act of 2013	To grant the Congressional Gold Medal, collectively, to the Monuments Men, in recognition of their heroic role in the preservation, protection, and restitution of monuments, works of art, and artifacts of cultural importance during and following World War II.
H.R. 3675	December 9, 2013	Federal Communications Commission Process Reform Act of 2013	To amend the Communications Act of 1934 to provide for greater transparency and efficiency in the procedures followed by the Federal Communications Commission.
H.R. 3696	December 11, 2013	National Cybersecurity and Critical Infrastructure Protection Act of 2013	To amend the Homeland Security Act of 2002 to make certain improvements regarding cybersecurity and critical infrastructure protection, and for other purposes.
H.R. 3771	December 12, 2013	Philippines Charitable Giving Assistance Act	To accelerate the income tax benefits for charitable cash contributions for the relief of victims of the Typhoon Haiyan in the Philippines.
H.R. 3786	December 16, 2013	(No short title)	To direct the Administrator of General Services, on behalf of the Archivist of the United States, to convey certain Federal property located in the State of Alaska to the Municipality of Anchorage, Alaska.
H.R. 3826	January 9, 2014	Electricity Security and Affordability Act	To provide direction to the Administrator of the Environmental Protection Agency regarding the establishment of standards for emissions of any greenhouse gas from fossil fuel-fired electric utility generating units, and for other purposes.
H.R. 3846	January 10, 2014	United States Customs and Border Protection Authorization Act	To provide for the authorization of border, maritime, and transportation security responsibilities and functions in the Department of Homeland Security and the establishment of United States Customs and Border Protection, and for other purposes.
H.R. 3964	January 29, 2014	Sacramento-San Joaquin Valley Emergency Water Delivery Act	To address certain water-related concerns in the Sacramento-San Joaquin Valley, and for other purposes.
H.R. 3973	January 29, 2014	Faithful Execution of the Law Act of 2014	To amend section 530D of title 28, United States Code.
H.R. 3979	January 31, 2014	Protecting Volunteer Firefighters and Emergency Responders Act	To amend the Internal Revenue Code of 1986 to ensure that emergency services volunteers are not taken into account as employees under the shared responsibility requirements contained in the Patient Protection and Affordable Care Act.
H.R. 3998	February 5, 2014	Albuquerque, New Mexico, Federal Land Conveyance Act of 2014	To authorize the Administrator of General Services to convey a parcel of real property in Albuquerque, New Mexico, to the Amy Biehl High School Foundation.
H.R. 4002	February 5, 2014	(No short title)	To revoke the charter of incorporation of the Miami Tribe of Oklahoma at the request of that tribe, and for other purposes.
H.R. 4005	February 6, 2014	Coast Guard and Maritime Transportation Act of 2014	To authorize appropriations for the United States Coast Guard for fiscal years 2015 and 2016, and for other purposes.
H.R. 4007	February 6, 2014	Chemical Facility Anti-Terrorism Standards Program Authorization and Accountability Act of 2014	To recodify and reauthorize the Chemical Facility Anti-Terrorism Standards Program.
H.R. 4015	February 6, 2014	SGR Repeal and Medicare Provider Payment Modernization Act of 2014	To amend title XVIII of the Social Security Act to repeal the Medicare sustainable growth rate and improve Medicare payments for physicians and other professionals, and for other purposes.
H.R. 4028	February 10, 2014	(No short title)	To amend the International Religious Freedom Act of 1998 to include the desecration of cemeteries among the many forms of violations of the right to religious freedom.
H.R. 4031	February 11, 2014	Department of Veterans Affairs Management Accountability Act of 2014	To amend title 38, United States Code, to provide for the removal of Senior Executive Service employees of the Department of Veterans Affairs for performance, and for other purposes.
H.R. 4032	February 11, 2014	North Texas Invasive Species Barrier Act of 2014	To exempt from Lacey Act Amendments of 1981 certain water transfers by the North Texas Municipal Water District and the Greater Texoma Utility Authority, and for other purposes.
H.R. 4058	February 14, 2014	Preventing Sex Trafficking and Improving Opportunities for Youth in Foster Care Act	To prevent and address sex trafficking of youth in foster care.
H.R. 4076	February 25, 2014	Home Heating Emergency Assistance Through Transportation Act of 2014	To address shortages and interruptions in the availability of propane and other home heating fuels in the United States, and for other purposes.
H.R. 4080	February 25, 2014	Trauma Systems and Regionalization of Emergency Care Reauthorization Act	To amend title XII of the Public Health Service Act to reauthorize certain trauma care programs, and for other purposes.
H.R. 4092	February 26, 2014	Streamlining Energy Efficiency for Schools Act of 2014	To amend the Energy Policy and Conservation Act to establish the Office of Energy Efficiency and Renewable Energy as the lead Federal agency for coordinating Federal, State, and local assistance provided to promote the energy retrofitting of schools.
H.R. 4118	February 28, 2014	Suspending the Individual Mandate Penalty Law Equals Fairness Act	To amend the Internal Revenue Code of 1986 to delay the implementation of the penalty for failure to comply with the individual health insurance mandate.
H.R. 4120	February 28, 2014	(No short title)	To amend the National Law Enforcement Museum Act to extend the termination date
H.R. 4137	March 4, 2014	Preserving Welfare for Needs Not Weed Act	To prohibit assistance provided under the program of block grants to States for temporary assistance for needy families from being accessed through the use of an electronic benefit transfer card at any store that offers marijuana for sale.
H.R. 4138	March 4, 2014	ENFORCE the Law Act of 2014	To protect the separation of powers in the Constitution of the United States by ensuring that the President takes care that the laws be faithfully executed, and for other purposes.
H.R. 4152	March 5, 2014	(No short title)	To provide for the costs of loan guarantees for Ukraine
H.R. 4156	March 6, 2014	Transparent Airfares Act of 2014	To amend title 49, United States Code, to allow advertisements and solicitations for passenger air transportation to state the base airfare of the transportation, and for other purposes.
H.R. 4167	March 6, 2014	Restoring Proven Financing for American Employers Act	To amend section 13 of the Bank Holding Company Act of 1956, known as the Volcker Rule, to exclude certain debt securities of collateralized loan obligations from the prohibition against acquiring or retaining an ownership interest in a hedge fund or private equity fund.
H.R. 4185	March 10, 2014	District of Columbia Courts, Public Defender Service, and Court Services and Offender Supervision Agency Act of 2014	To revise certain authorities of the District of Columbia courts, the Court Services and Offender Supervision Agency for the District of Columbia, and the Public Defender Service for the District of Columbia, and for other purposes.
H.R. 4192	March 11, 2014	(No short title)	To amend the Act entitled An Act to regulate the height of buildings in the District of Columbia to clarify the rules of the District of Columbia regarding human occupancy of penthouses above the top story of the building upon which the penthouse is placed.
H.R. 4193	March 11, 2014	Smart Savings Act (H.R. 4193; 113th Congress)	To amend title 5, United States Code, to change the default investment fund under the Thrift Savings Plan, and for other purposes.
H.R. 4194	March 11, 2014	Government Reports Elimination Act of 2014	To provide for the elimination or modification of Federal reporting requirements.
H.R. 4195	March 11, 2014	Federal Register Modernization Act	To amend chapter 15 of title 44, United States Code (commonly known as the Federal Register Act), to modernize the Federal Register, and for other purposes.
H.R. 4197	March 11, 2014	All Circuit Review Extension Act	To amend title 5, United States Code, to extend the period of certain authority with respect to judicial review of Merit Systems Protection Board decisions relating to whistleblowers, and for other purposes.
H.R. 4225	March 13, 2014	Stop Advertising Victims of Exploitation Act of 2014	To amend title 18, United States Code, to provide a penalty for knowingly selling advertising that offers certain commercial sex acts.
H.R. 4228	March 13, 2014	DHS Acquisition Accountability and Efficiency Act	To require the Department of Homeland Security to improve discipline, accountability, and transparency in acquisition program management.
H.R. 4261	March 14, 2014	Gulf War Health Research Reform Act of 2014	To improve the research of Gulf War Illness, the Research Advisory Committee on Gulf War Veterans' Illnesses, and for other purposes.
H.R. 4263	March 14, 2014	Social Media Working Group Act of 2014	To amend the Homeland Security Act of 2002 to authorize the United States Department of Homeland Security to establish a social media working group, and for other purposes.
H.R. 4275	March 18, 2014	Cooperative and Small Employer Charity Pension Flexibility Act	To amend the Employee Retirement Income Security Act of 1974 and the Internal Revenue Code of 1986 to provide for cooperative and small employer charity pension plans.
H.R. 4278	March 21, 2014	Ukraine Support Act	To support the independence, sovereignty, and territorial integrity of Ukraine, and for other purposes.
H.R. 4283	March 21, 2014	(No short title)	To amend the Wild and Scenic Rivers Act to authorize the Secretary of the Interior to maintain or replace certain facilities and structures for commercial recreation services at Smith Gulch in Idaho, and for other purposes.
H.R. 4289	March 24, 2014	Department of Homeland Security Interoperable Communications Act	To amend the Homeland Security Act of 2002 to require the Under Secretary for Management of the Department of Homeland Security to take administrative action to achieve and maintain interoperable communications capabilities among the components of the Department of Homeland Security, and for other purposes.
H.R. 4292	March 25, 2014	Foreign Cultural Exchange Jurisdictional Immunity Clarification Act	To amend chapter 97 of title 28, United States Code, to clarify the exception to foreign sovereign immunity set forth in section 1605(a)(3) of such title.
H.R. 4302	March 26, 2014	Protecting Access to Medicare Act of 2014	To amend the Social Security Act to extend Medicare payments to physicians and other provisions of the Medicare and Medicaid programs, and for other purposes.
H.R. 4323	March 27, 2014	Debbie Smith Reauthorization Act of 2014	To reauthorize programs authorized under the Debbie Smith Act of 2004, and for other purposes.
H.R. 4366	April 2, 2014	Strengthening Education through Research Act	To strengthen the Federal education research system to make research and evaluations more timely and relevant to State and local needs in order to increase student achievement.
H.R. 4386	April 3, 2014	Money Remittances Improvement Act of 2014	To allow the Secretary of the Treasury to rely on State examinations for certain financial institutions, and for other purposes.
H.R. 4411	April 7, 2014	Hezbollah International Financing Prevention Act of 2014	To prevent Hezbollah and associated entities from gaining access to international financial and other institutions, and for other purposes.
H.R. 4412	April 7, 2014	National Aeronautics and Space Administration Authorization Act of 2014	To authorize the programs of the National Aeronautics and Space Administration, and for other purposes.
H.R. 4413	April 7, 2014	Customer Protection and End User Relief Act	To reauthorize the Commodity Futures Trading Commission, to better protect futures customers, to provide end users with market certainty, to make basic reforms to ensure transparency and accountability at the commission, to help farmers, ranchers, and end users manage risks to help keep consumer costs low, and for other purposes.
H.R. 4414	April 7, 2014	Expatriate Health Coverage Clarification Act of 2014	To clarify the treatment under the Patient Protection and Affordable Care Act of health plans in which expatriates are the primary enrollees, and for other purposes.
H.R. 4435	April 9, 2014	Howard P. "Buck" McKeon National Defense Authorization Act for Fiscal Year 2015	To authorize appropriations for fiscal year 2015 for military activities of the Department of Defense and for military construction, to prescribe military personnel strengths for such fiscal year, and for other purposes.
H.R. 4438	April 9, 2014	American Research and Competitiveness Act of 2014	To amend the Internal Revenue Code of 1986 to simplify and make permanent the research credit.
H.R. 4449	April 10, 2014	Human Trafficking Prevention Act	To amend the Trafficking Victims Protection Act of 2000 to expand the training for Federal Government personnel related to trafficking in persons, and for other purposes.
H.R. 4450	April 10, 2014	Travel Promotion, Enhancement, and Modernization Act of 2014	To extend the Travel Promotion Act of 2009, and for other purposes.
H.R. 4453	April 10, 2014	Permanent S Corporation Built-in Gains Recognition Period Act of 2014	To amend the Internal Revenue Code of 1986 to make permanent the reduced recognition period for built-in gains of S corporations.
H.R. 4457	April 10, 2014	America's Small Business Tax Relief Act of 2014	To amend the Internal Revenue Code of 1986 to permanently extend increased expensing limitations, and for other purposes.
H.R. 4486	April 17, 2014	Military Construction and Veterans Affairs and Related Agencies Appropriations Act, 2015	Making appropriations for military construction, the Department of Veterans Affairs, and related agencies for the fiscal year ending September 30, 2015, and for other purposes.
H.R. 4487	April 17, 2014	Legislative Branch Appropriations Act, 2015	Making appropriations for the Legislative Branch for the fiscal year ending September 30, 2015, and for other purposes.
H.R. 4490	April 28, 2014	United States International Communications Reform Act of 2014	To enhance the missions, objectives, and effectiveness of United States international communications, and for other purposes.
H.R. 4572	May 6, 2014	STELA Reauthorization Act of 2014	To amend the Communications Act of 1934 to extend expiring provisions relating to the retransmission of signals of television broadcast stations, and for other purposes.
H.R. 4573	May 6, 2014	International Megan's Law to Prevent Demand for Child Sex Trafficking	To protect children from exploitation, especially sex trafficking in tourism, by providing advance notice of intended travel by registered child-sex offenders outside the United States to the government of the country of destination, requesting foreign governments to notify the United States when a known child-sex offender is seeking to enter the United States, and for other purposes.
H.R. 4587	May 7, 2014	Venezuelan Human Rights and Democracy Protection Act	To impose targeted sanctions on individuals responsible for carrying out or ordering human rights abuses against the citizens of Venezuela, and for other purposes.
H.R. 4631	May 9, 2014	Autism CARES Act of 2014	To reauthorize certain provisions of the Public Health Service Act relating to autism, and for other purposes.
H.R. 4653	May 9, 2014	United States Commission on International Religious Freedom Reauthorization Act of 2014	To reauthorize the United States Commission on International Religious Freedom, and for other purposes.
H.R. 4660	May 15, 2014	Commerce, Justice, Science, and Related Agencies Appropriations Act, 2015	Making appropriations for the Departments of Commerce and Justice, Science, and Related Agencies for the fiscal year ending September 30, 2015, and for other purposes.
H.R. 4681	May 20, 2014	Intelligence Authorization Act for Fiscal Years 2014 and 2015	To authorize appropriations for fiscal years 2014 and 2015 for intelligence and intelligence-related activities of the United States Government, the Community Management Account, and the Central Intelligence Agency Retirement and Disability System, and for other purposes.
H.R. 4719	May 22, 2014	Fighting Hunger Incentive Act of 2014	To amend the Internal Revenue Code of 1986 to permanently extend and expand the charitable deduction for contributions of food inventory.
H.R. 4745	May 27, 2014	Transportation, Housing and Urban Development, and Related Agencies Appropriations Act, 2015	Making appropriations for the Departments of Transportation, and Housing and Urban Development, and related agencies for the fiscal year ending September 30, 2015, and for other purposes.
H.R. 4771	May 29, 2014	Designer Anabolic Steroid Control Act of 2014	To amend the Controlled Substances Act to more effectively regulate anabolic steroids.
H.R. 4800	June 4, 2014	Agriculture, Rural Development, Food and Drug Administration, and Related Agencies Appropriations Act, 2015	Making appropriations for Agriculture, Rural Development, Food and Drug Administration, and Related Agencies programs for the fiscal year ending September 30, 2015, and for other purposes.
H.R. 4801	June 5, 2014	(No short title)	To require the Secretary of Energy to prepare a report on the impact of thermal insulation on both energy and water use for potable hot water
H.R. 4802	June 5, 2014	Gerardo Hernandez Airport Security Act of 2014	To improve intergovernmental planning for and communication during security incidents at domestic airports, and for other purposes.
H.R. 4803	June 5, 2014	TSA Office of Inspection Accountability Act of 2014	To require the Transportation Security Administration to conform to existing Federal law and regulations regarding criminal investigator positions, and for other purposes.
H.R. 4810	June 9, 2014	Veteran Access to Care Act of 2014	To direct the Secretary of Veterans Affairs to enter into contracts for the provision of hospital care and medical services at non-Department of Veterans Affairs facilities for United States Department of Veterans Affairs patients with extended waiting times for appointments at Department facilities, and for other purposes.
H.R. 4812	June 9, 2014	Honor Flight Act	To amend title 49, United States Code, to require the Administrator of the Transportation Security Administration to establish a process for providing expedited and dignified passenger screening services for veterans traveling to visit war memorials built and dedicated to honor their service, and for other purposes.
H.R. 4870	June 13, 2014	Department of Defense Appropriations Act, 2015	Making appropriations for the Department of Defense for the fiscal year ending September 30, 2015, and for other purposes.
H.R. 4899	June 19, 2014	Lowering Gasoline Prices to Fuel an America That Works Act of 2014	To lower gasoline prices for the American family by increasing domestic onshore and offshore energy exploration and production, to streamline and improve onshore and offshore energy permitting and administration, and for other purposes.
H.R. 4923	June 20, 2014	Energy and Water Development and Related Agencies Appropriations Act, 2015	Making appropriations for energy and water development and related agencies for the fiscal year ending September 30, 2015, and for other purposes.
H.R. 4935	June 23, 2014	Child Tax Credit Improvement Act of 2014	To amend the Internal Revenue Code of 1986 to make improvements to the child tax credit.
H.R. 4980	July 26, 2014	Preventing Sex Trafficking and Strengthening Families Act	To prevent and address sex trafficking of children in foster care, to extend and improve adoption incentives, and to improve international child support recovery.
H.R. 4983	June 26, 2014	Strengthening Transparency in Higher Education Act	To simplify and streamline the information regarding institutions of higher education made publicly available by the Secretary of Education, and for other purposes.
H.R. 4994	June 26, 2014	Improving Medicare Post-Acute Care Transformation Act of 2014	To amend title XVIII of the Social Security Act to provide for standardized post-acute care assessment data for quality, payment, and discharge planning, and for other purposes.
H.R. 5016	July 2, 2014	Financial Services and General Government Appropriations Act, 2015	Making appropriations for financial services and general government for the fiscal year ending September 30, 2015, and for other purposes.
H.R. 5029	July 8, 2014	International Science and Technology Cooperation Act of 2014	To provide for the establishment of a body to identify and coordinate international science and technology cooperation that can strengthen the domestic science and technology enterprise and support United States foreign policy goals.
H.R. 5031	July 8, 2014	STEM Education Act of 2014	To define STEM education to include computer science, and to support existing STEM education programs at the National Science Foundation.
H.R. 5056	July 10, 2014	Research and Development Efficiency Act	To improve the efficiency of Federal research and development, and for other purposes.
H.R. 5057	July 10, 2014	EPS Service Parts Act of 2014	To amend the Energy Policy and Conservation Act to permit exemptions for external power supplies from certain efficiency standards, and for other purposes.
H.R. 5078	July 11, 2014	Waters of the United States Regulatory Overreach Protection Act of 2014	To preserve existing rights and responsibilities with respect to waters of the United States, and for other purposes.
H.R. 5108	July 15, 2014	(No short title)	To establish the Law School Clinic Certification Program of the United States Patent and Trademark Office, and for other purposes.
H.R. 5161	July 22, 2014	E-LABEL Act	To promote the non-exclusive use of electronic labeling for devices licensed by the Federal Communications Commission.
H.R. 5169	July 23, 2014	Senior Executive Service Accountability Act	To amend title 5, United States Code, to enhance accountability within the Senior Executive Service, and for other purposes.
H.R. 5170	July 23, 2014	Federal Records Accountability Act of 2014	To improve Federal employee compliance with the Federal and Presidential recordkeeping requirements, and for other purposes.
H.R. 5195	July 24, 2014	Emergency Afghan Allies Extension Act of 2014	To provide additional visas for the Afghan Special Immigrant Visa Program, and for other purposes.
H.R. 5205	July 25, 2014	Northern Nevada Land Conservation and Economic Development Act	To authorize certain land conveyances involving public lands in northern Nevada to promote economic development and conservation, and for other purposes.
H.R. 5230	July 29, 2014	(No short title)	Making supplemental appropriations for the fiscal year ending September 30, 2014, and for other purposes.
H.R. 5309	July 31, 2014	Tsunami Warning, Education, and Research Act of 2014	To authorize and strengthen the tsunami detection, forecast, warning, research, and mitigation program of the National Oceanic and Atmospheric Administration, and for other purposes.

=== House resolutions ===
H.R. number	Date of introduction	Short title	Description
H.Res. 418	November 18, 2013	(No short title)	Urging the Government of Burma to end the persecution of the Rohingya people and respect internationally recognized human rights for all ethnic and religious minority groups within Burma
H.Res. 565	May 2, 2014	(No short title)	Calling on Attorney General Eric H. Holder, Jr., to appoint a special counsel to investigate the targeting of conservative nonprofit groups by the Internal Revenue Service
H.Res. 574	May 7, 2014	(No short title)	Recommending that the House of Representatives find Lois G. Lerner, former director, Exempt Organizations, Internal Revenue Service, in contempt of Congress for refusal to comply with a subpoena duly issued by the Committee on Oversight and Government Reform. (See: Finding Lois Lerner in contempt of Congress (H.Res. 574; 113th Congress))
H.Res. 608	May 30, 2014	(No short title)	Condemning the senseless rampage and mass shooting that took place in Isla Vista, California, on Friday May 23, 2014.

=== Concurrent resolutions ===
Number	Date of introduction	Short title	Description
H.Con.Res. 25	March 15, 2013	(No short title)	2014 United States federal budget Establishing the budget for the United States Government for fiscal year 2014 and setting forth appropriate budgetary levels for fiscal years 2015 through 2023.

=== House joint resolutions ===
Number	Date of introduction	Short title	Description
H.J.Res. 59	September 10, 2013	Continuing Appropriations Resolution, 2014	Making continuing appropriations for fiscal year 2014, and for other purposes. Later became the Bipartisan Budget Act of 2013, the Paul Ryan and Patty Murray budget proposal.
H.J.Res. 70	October 1, 2013	National Park Service Operations, Smithsonian Institution, National Gallery of Art, and United States Holocaust Memorial Museum Continuing Appropriations Resolution, 2014	Making continuing appropriations for National Park Service operations, the Smithsonian Institution, the National Gallery of Art, and the United States Holocaust Memorial Museum for fiscal year 2014, and for other purposes
H.J.Res. 71	October 1, 2013	District of Columbia Continuing Appropriations Resolution, 2014	Making continuing appropriations of local funds of the District of Columbia for fiscal year 2014.
H.J.Res. 72	October 1, 2013	Veterans Benefits Continuing Appropriations Resolution, 2014	Making continuing appropriations for veterans benefits for fiscal year 2014, and for other purposes.
H.J.Res. 73	October 2, 2013	National Institutes of Health Continuing Appropriations Resolution, 2014	Making continuing appropriations for the National Institutes of Health for fiscal year 2014, and for other purposes.
H.J.Res. 75	October 3, 2013	Special Supplemental Nutrition Program for Women, Infants, and Children Continuing Appropriations Resolution, 2014	Making continuing appropriations for the Special Supplemental Nutrition Program for Women, Infants, and Children for fiscal year 2014, and for other purposes.
H.J.Res. 77	October 3, 2013	Food and Drug Administration Continuing Appropriations Resolution, 2014	Making continuing appropriations for the Food and Drug Administration for fiscal year 2014, and for other purposes.
H.J.Res. 84	October 3, 2013	Head Start Continuing Appropriations Resolution, 2014	Making continuing appropriations for Head Start for fiscal year 2014, and for other purposes.
H.J.Res. 85	October 3, 2013	Federal Emergency Management Agency Continuing Appropriations Resolution, 2014	Making continuing appropriations for the Federal Emergency Management Agency for fiscal year 2014, and for other purposes.
H.J.Res. 106	January 10, 2014	(No short title)	Making further continuing appropriations for fiscal year 2014, and for other purposes.
H.J.Res. 120	July 23, 2014	(No short title)	Approving the location of a memorial to commemorate the more than 5,000 slaves and free Black persons who fought for independence in the American Revolution
H.J.Res. 124	September 9, 2014	Continuing Appropriations Resolution, 2015	Making continuing appropriations for fiscal year 2015, and for other purposes.

== Introduced in the Senate ==
=== Passed by the Senate, waiting in the House ===
H.R. number	Date of introduction	Short title	Description
S. 744	April 16, 2013	Border Security, Economic Opportunity, and Immigration Modernization Act	To provide for comprehensive immigration reform and for other purposes.

=== Other legislation ===
Senate number	Date of introduction	Short title	Description
S. 23	January 22, 2013	Sleeping Bear Dunes National Lakeshore Conservation and Recreation Act	To designate as wilderness certain land and inland water within the Sleeping Bear Dunes National Lakeshore in the State of Michigan, and for other purposes.
S. 42	January 22, 2013	Criminal Antitrust Anti-Retaliation Act of 2013	To provide anti-retaliation protections for antitrust whistleblowers.
S. 47	January 22, 2013	Violence Against Women Reauthorization Act of 2013	To reauthorize the Violence Against Women Act of 1994.
S. 130	January 24, 2013	Powell Shooting Range Land Conveyance Act	To require the Secretary of the Interior to convey certain Federal land to the Powell Recreation District in the State of Wyoming.
S. 150	January 24, 2013	Assault Weapons Ban of 2013	To regulate assault weapons, to ensure that the right to keep and bear arms is not unlimited, and for other purposes.
S. 157	January 28, 2013	Denali National Park Improvement Act	To provide for certain improvements to the Denali National Park and Preserve in the State of Alaska, and for other purposes.
S. 252	February 7, 2013	PREEMIE Reauthorization Act	To reduce preterm labor and delivery and the risk of pregnancy-related deaths and complications due to pregnancy, and to reduce infant mortality caused by prematurity.
S. 256	February 7, 2013	(No short title)	To amend Public Law 93–435 with respect to the Northern Mariana Islands, providing parity with Guam, the Virgin Islands, and American Samoa
S. 287	February 12, 2013	(No short title)	To amend title 38, United States Code, to expand the definition of homeless veteran for purposes of benefits under the laws administered by the Secretary of Veterans Affairs, and for other purposes.
S. 296	February 13, 2013	Uniting American Families Act of 2013	To amend the Immigration and Nationality Act to eliminate discrimination in the immigration laws by permitting permanent partners of United States citizens and lawful permanent residents to obtain lawful permanent resident status in the same manner as spouses of citizens and lawful permanent residents and to penalize immigration fraud in connection with permanent partnerships.
S. 304	February 13, 2013	Natchez Trace Parkway Land Conveyance Act of 2013	To direct the Secretary of the Interior to convey to the State of Mississippi two parcels of surplus land within the boundary of the Natchez Trace Parkway, and for other purposes.
S. 309	February 13, 2013	(No short title)	A bill to award a Congressional Gold Medal to the World War II members of the Civil Air Patrol.
S. 330	February 14, 2013	HIV Organ Policy Equity Act	To amend the Public Health Service Act to establish safeguards and standards of quality for research and transplantation of organs infected with human immunodeficiency virus (HIV).
S. 336	February 14, 2013	Marketplace Fairness Act of 2013	To restore States' sovereign rights to enforce State and local sales and use tax laws, and for other purposes.
S. 376	February 25, 2013	Drought Information Act of 2013	To reauthorize the National Integrated Drought Information System, and for other purposes.
S. 404	February 28, 2013	Green Mountain Lookout Heritage Protection Act	To preserve the Green Mountain Lookout in the Glacier Peak Wilderness of the Mount Baker-Snoqualmie National Forest.
S. 459	March 5, 2013	Minuteman Missile National Historic Site Boundary Modification Act	To modify the boundary of the Minuteman Missile National Historic Site in the State of South Dakota, and for other purposes.
S. 462	March 4, 2013	United States-Israel Strategic Partnership Act of 2013	To strengthen the strategic alliance between the United States and Israel.
S. 517	March 11, 2013	Unlocking Consumer Choice and Wireless Competition Act	To promote consumer choice and wireless competition by permitting consumers to unlock mobile wireless devices, and for other purposes.
S. 540	March 12, 2013	Temporary Debt Limit Extension Act	An act to temporarily extend the public debt limit, and for other purposes.
S. 611	March 19, 2013	Sandia Pueblo Settlement Technical Amendment Act	To make a technical amendment to the T'uf Shur Bien Preservation Trust Area Act, and for other purposes.
S. 622	March 20, 2013	Animal Drug and Animal Generic Drug User Fee Reauthorization Act of 2013	To amend the Federal Food, Drug, and Cosmetic Act to reauthorize user fee programs relating to new animal drugs and generic new animal drugs.
S. 649	March 20, 2013	Safe Communities, Safe Schools Act of 2013	Gun bill best known for including the Manchin-Toomey Public Safety And Second Amendment Rights Protection Act amendment.
S. 743	April 16, 2013	Marketplace Fairness Act of 2013	To restore States' sovereign rights to enforce State and local sales and use tax laws, and for other purposes.
S. 793	April 24, 2013	Organization of American States Revitalization and Reform Act of 2013	To support revitalization and reform of the Organization of American States, and for other purposes.
S. 815	April 25, 2013	Employment Non-Discrimination Act of 2013	To prohibit the employment discrimination on the basis of sexual orientation or gender identity.
S. 893	May 8, 2013	Veterans' Compensation Cost-of-Living Adjustment Act of 2013	To provide for an increase, effective December 1, 2013, in the rates of compensation for veterans with service-connected disabilities and the rates of dependency and indemnity compensation for the survivors of certain disabled veterans, and for other purposes.
S. 954	May 14, 2013	Agriculture Reform, Food, and Jobs Act of 2013	An original bill to reauthorize agricultural programs through 2018. Popularly known as the "farm bill" or the "Senate farm bill."
S. 982	May 16, 2013	Freedom to Fish Act	A bill to prohibit the Corps of Engineers from taking certain actions to establish a restricted area prohibiting public access to waters downstream of a dam, and for other purposes.
S. 994	May 21, 2013	Digital Accountability and Transparency Act of 2014	To expand the Federal Funding Accountability and Transparency Act of 2006 to increase accountability and transparency in Federal spending, and for other purposes.
S. 1044	May 23, 2013	World War II Memorial Prayer Act of 2013	To direct the Secretary of the Interior to install in the area of the World War II Memorial in the District of Columbia a suitable plaque or an inscription with the words that President Franklin D. Roosevelt prayed with the United States on D-Day, June 6, 1944.
S. 1086	June 3, 2013	Child Care and Development Block Grant Act of 2013	To reauthorize and improve the Child Care and Development Block Grant Act of 1990, and for other purposes.
S. 1121	June 7, 2013	Fourth Amendment Restoration Act	to stop the National Security Agency from spying on citizens of the United States and for other purposes.
S. 1174	June 18, 2013	(No short title)	To award a Congressional Gold Medal to the 65th Infantry Regiment, known as the Borinqueneers.
S. 1215	June 24, 2013	FISA Accountability and Privacy Protection Act of 2013	A bill to strengthen privacy protections, accountability, and oversight related to domestic surveillance conducted pursuant to the USA PATRIOT Act and the Foreign Intelligence Surveillance Act of 1978.
S. 1237	June 27, 2013	Omnibus Territories Act of 2013	To improve the administration of programs in the insular areas, and for other purposes.
S. 1254	June 27, 2014	Harmful Algal Bloom and Hypoxia Research and Control Amendments Act of 2013	To amend the Harmful Algal Blooms and Hypoxia Research and Control Act of 1998, and for other purposes.
S. 1302	July 16, 2013	Cooperative and Small Employer Charity Pension Flexibility Act	To amend the Employee Retirement Income Security Act of 1974 and the Internal Revenue Code of 1986 to provide for cooperative and small employer charity pension plans.
S. 1348	July 23, 2013	Congressional Award Program Reauthorization Act of 2013	To reauthorize the Congressional Award Act.
S. 1392	July 30, 2013	Energy Savings and Industrial Competitiveness Act of 2013	To promote energy savings in residential buildings and industry, and for other purposes.
S. 1557	September 27, 2013	Children's Hospital GME Support Reauthorization Act of 2013	To amend the Public Health Service Act to reauthorize support for graduate medical education programs in children's hospitals.
S. 1561	September 30, 2013	CHIMP Act Amendments of 2013	To amend the Public Health Service Act to improve provisions relating to the sanctuary system for surplus chimpanzees.
S. 1603	October 29, 2014	Gun Lake Trust Land Reaffirmation Act	To reaffirm that certain land has been taken into trust for the benefit of the Match-E-Be-Nash-She-Wish Band of Pottawatami Indians, and for other purposes.
S. 1681	November 12, 2013	Intelligence Authorization Act for Fiscal Year 2014	To authorize appropriations for fiscal year 2014 for intelligence and intelligence-related activities of the United States Government and the Office of the Director of National Intelligence, the Central Intelligence Agency Retirement and Disability System, and for other purposes.
S. 1737	November 19, 2013	Minimum Wage Fairness Act	To provide for an increase in the Federal minimum wage and to amend the Internal Revenue Code of 1986 to extend increased expensing limitations and the treatment of certain real property as section 179 property.
S. 1799	December 11, 2013	Victims of Child Abuse Act Reauthorization Act of 2013	To reauthorize subtitle A of the Victims of Child Abuse Act of 1990.
S. 1845	December 17, 2013	Emergency Unemployment Compensation Extension Act	To provide for the extension of certain unemployment benefits, and for other purposes.
S. 1901	January 9, 2014	Support for United States-Republic of Korea Civil Nuclear Cooperation Act	To authorize the President to extend the term of the nuclear energy agreement with the Republic of Korea until March 19, 2016.
S. 1917	January 14, 2014	Victims Protection Act of 2014	To provide for additional enhancements of the sexual assault prevention and response activities of the Armed Forces.
S. 1926	January 14, 2014	Homeowner Flood Insurance Affordability Act of 2014	To delay the implementation of certain provisions of the Biggert–Waters Flood Insurance Reform Act of 2012 and to reform the National Association of Registered Agents and Brokers, and for other purposes.
S. 1963	January 27, 2014	(No short title)	To repeal section 403 of the Bipartisan Budget Act of 2013
S. 2086	March 6, 2014	Reliable Home Heating Act	To address current emergency shortages of propane and other home heating fuels and to provide greater flexibility and information for Governors to address such emergencies in the future.
S. 2124	March 12, 2014	Support for the Sovereignty, Integrity, Democracy, and Economic Stability of Ukraine Act of 2014	An original bill to support sovereignty and democracy in Ukraine, and for other purposes.
S. 2154	March 25, 2014	Emergency Medical Services for Children Reauthorization Act of 2014	To amend the Public Health Service Act to reauthorize the Emergency Medical Services for Children Program.
S. 2183	March 27, 2014	United States International Programming to Ukraine and Neighboring Regions	A bill entitled "United States International Programming to Ukraine and Neighboring Regions".
S. 2195	April 1, 2014	(No short title)	To deny admission to the United States to any representative to the United Nations who has engaged in espionage activities against the United States, poses a threat to United States national security interests, or has engaged in a terrorist activity against the United States.
S. 2199	April 1, 2014	Paycheck Fairness Act	A bill to amend the Fair Labor Standards Act of 1938 to provide more effective remedies to victims of discrimination in the payment of wages on the basis of sex, and for other purposes.
S. 2258	April 28, 2014	Veterans' Compensation Cost-of-Living Adjustment Act of 2014	To provide for an increase, effective December 1, 2014, in the rates of compensation for veterans with service-connected disabilities and the rates of dependency and indemnity compensation for the survivors of certain disabled veterans, and for other purposes.
S. 2260	April 28, 2014	EXPIRE Act of 2014	A bill to amend the Internal Revenue Code of 1986 to extend certain expiring provisions, and for other purposes. (This bill is being amended on to the Hire More Heroes Act of 2013 (H.R. 3474; 113th Congress). This process is called using a legislative vehicle.)
S. 2262	April 28, 2014	Energy Savings and Industrial Competitiveness Act of 2014	A bill to promote energy savings in residential buildings and industry, and for other purposes.
S. 2270	April 29, 2014	Insurance Capital Standards Clarification Act of 2014	To clarify the application of certain leverage and risk-based requirements under the Dodd-Frank Wall Street Reform and Consumer Protection Act.
S. 2323	May 13, 2014	Gold Star Fathers Act of 2014	To amend chapter 21 of title 5, United States Code, to provide that fathers of certain permanently disabled or deceased veterans shall be included with mothers of such veterans as preference eligibles for treatment in the civil service.
S. 2363	May 20, 2014	Bipartisan Sportsmen's Act of 2014	A bill to protect and enhance opportunities for recreational hunting, fishing, and shooting, and for other purposes.
S. 2569	July 8, 2014	Bring Jobs Home Act	A bill to provide an incentive for businesses to bring jobs back to America.

=== Concurrent resolutions ===
Senate number	Date of introduction	Short title	Description
S.Con.Res. 8	March 15, 2013	(No short title)	2014 United States federal budget Setting forth the congressional budget for the United States Government for fiscal year 2014, revising the appropriate budgetary levels for fiscal year 2013, and setting forth the appropriate budgetary levels for fiscal years 2015 through 2023.
S.Con.Res. 10	March 22, 2013	(No short title)	Senate Concurrent Resolution 10 of the 113th Congress; Authorizing the use of Emancipation Hall in the Capitol Visitor Center for an event to celebrate the birthday of King Kamehameha.

=== Senate joint resolutions ===
Senate number	Date of introduction	Short title	Description
S.J.Res. 21	September 6, 2013	Authorization for the Use of Military Force Against the Government of Syria to Respond to Use of Chemical Weapons	An original joint resolution to authorize the limited and specified use of the United States Armed Forces against Syria.

== See also ==
- List of United States federal legislation
- Acts of the 113th United States Congress
- Procedures of the U.S. Congress
