= H.R. 1961 (113th Congress) =

- Long title: To amend title 46, United States Code, to extend the exemption from the fire-retardant materials construction requirement for vessels operating within the Boundary Line.
- Announced in: the 113th United States Congress
- Sponsored by: Rep. Steve Chabot (R, OH-1)
- Number of co-sponsors: 3

Codification
- U.S.C. sections affected: 46 U.S.C. § 3503(a)

Legislative history
- Introduced in the House as H.R. 1961 by Rep. Steve Chabot (R, OH-1) on May 14, 2013; Committee consideration by United States House Committee on Transportation and Infrastructure, United States House Transportation Subcommittee on Coast Guard and Maritime Transportation

The bill H.R. 1961, entitled "to amend title 46, United States Code, to extend the exemption from the fire-retardant materials construction requirement for vessels operating within the Boundary Line," was legislation that was introduced into the United States House of Representatives during the 113th United States Congress.

A federal law was passed in 1966 (46 U.S.C. § 3503) that requires all "vessels with overnight accommodations for more than 50 passengers to be built of fire-retardant material." The passenger boat Delta Queen, paddle-wheel, steam driven riverboat constructed in 1926 is believed to be the only boat that would be affected by this legislation. Previously there was an exemption for boats that met three qualifications: (1) notification of passengers that the boat didn't meet fire safety standards; (2) agree to be held liable for fire damage; and (3) make sure that modifications to non-public parts of the boat were up to fire-retardant regulations. This exemption has been extended nine times since it was first passed in 1966, but expired on November 1, 2008.

H.R. 1961 would extend the exemption again, until November 1, 2028.

== Provisions of the bill ==
This summary is based largely on the summary provided by the Congressional Research Service, a public domain source.

H.R. 1961 would amend federal shipping law to extend through October 31, 2028, the exemption of certain vessels from the requirement that U.S. passenger vessels having berth or stateroom accommodations for at least 50 passengers be constructed of fire-retardant materials in order to be granted a certificate of inspection. The bill would continue to apply this exemption only to vessels in operation before January 1, 1968, which operate only within the Boundary Line (the dividing point between inland waters and high seas).

== Congressional Budget Office report ==
This summary is based largely on the summary provided by the Congressional Budget Office, a public domain source, as ordered reported by the House Committee on Transportation and Infrastructure on July 18, 2013.

In 2008, the Congress removed an exemption in law that allowed certain vessels constructed of wood and containing stateroom accommodations to carry more than 50 passengers. H.R. 1961 would reinstate that exemption and permit those vessels to exceed the 50-passenger limit until 2028. The Congressional Budget Office (CBO) estimates that there is one vessel affected by the exemption, a historic steamboat currently based in Chattanooga, Tennessee.

The CBO estimates that enacting the legislation would have no impact on the federal budget because the United States Coast Guard would continue to inspect the vessel under the provisions of the bill or under current law. Enacting H.R. 1961 would not affect direct spending or revenues; therefore, pay-as-you-go procedures do not apply.

H.R. 1961 contains no intergovernmental or private-sector mandates as defined in the Unfunded Mandates Reform Act and would not affect the budgets of state, local, or tribal governments.

== Procedural history ==
=== House ===
H.R. 1961 was introduced on May 14, 2013 by Rep. Steve Chabot (R, OH-1). It was referred to the United States House Committee on Transportation and Infrastructure and the United States House Transportation Subcommittee on Coast Guard and Maritime Transportation. Committee consideration and markup took place on July 18, 2013, before the bill was ordered reported by voice vote. On September 20, 2013, House Majority Leader Eric Cantor announced that H.R. 1961 would be on the legislative schedule for the week of September 23. It was scheduled to be considered under a suspension of the rules on September 25, 2013.

== See also ==
- List of bills in the 113th United States Congress
- Delta Queen
- Fire safety
- Fire retardant
