= Animal Drug and Animal Generic Drug User Fee Reauthorization Act of 2013 =

Bill of law

- Long title: To amend the Federal Food, Drug, and Cosmetic Act to reauthorize user fee programs relating to new animal drugs and generic new animal drugs.
- Announced in: the 113th United States Congress
- Sponsored by: Tom Harkin (D-IA)
- Number of co-sponsors: 0

Citations
- Public law: Pub. L. 113–14 (text) (PDF)

Codification
- Acts affected: Animal Drug User Fee Act of 2003, Animal Drug User Fee Amendments of 2008, Animal Drug User Fee Amendments of 2013, Animal Generic Drug User Fee Act of 2008, Federal Food, Drug, and Cosmetic Act
- U.S.C. sections affected: 21 U.S.C. § 301 et seq., § 379j-11 et seq., § 379j-12, § 379j-13, § 379j-21, § 379j-22, and others
- Agencies affected: United States Congress, Department of Health and Human Services, Food and Drug Administration,
- Authorizations of appropriations: $148,104,000

[S. 622 Legislative history]
- Introduced in the Senate as S. 622 by Tom Harkin (D-IA) on March 20, 2013; Passed the Senate on May 8, 2013 (Unanimous consent); Passed the House on June 3, 2013 (390-12 Roll Call Vote 185); Signed into law by President Barack Obama on June 13, 2013

The Animal Drug and Animal Generic Drug User Fee Reauthorization Act of 2013 (S. 622; Pub. L. 113–14 (text) (PDF)) is a bill that was introduced into the United States Senate during the 113th United States Congress. The bill would authorize the collection of fees by the Food and Drug Administration for use to fund activities related to the approval of drugs for animals. The bill would amend the Federal Food, Drug, and Cosmetic Act.

The bill was signed by President Barack Obama on June 13, 2013, becoming Pub. L. 113–14 (text) (PDF).

== Provisions/Elements of the bill ==
The Animal Drug and Animal Generic Drug User Fee Reauthorization Act of 2013 would authorize the collection and spending of fees by the Food and Drug Administration (FDA) for certain activities to expedite the development and marketing approval of drugs for use in animals. Fees would supplement appropriated funds to cover FDA’s costs associated with reviewing certain applications and investigational submissions for brand and generic animal drugs. Such fees could be collected and made available for obligation only to the extent and in the amounts provided in advance in appropriation acts. The legislation would extend through fiscal year 2018, and make several technical changes to, FDA’s existing fee programs for brand and generic animal drugs, which expire at the end of fiscal year 2013.

== Procedural history ==
=== Senate ===
The Animal Drug and Animal Generic Drug User Fee Reauthorization Act of 2013 (S. 622) was introduced into the United States Senate on March 20, 2013 by Senator Tom Harkin (D-Iowa). On May 8, 2013, the bill passed the Senate by Unanimous consent.

=== House ===
The Animal Drug and Animal Generic Drug User Fee Reauthorization Act of 2013 was received in the United States House of Representatives on May 9, 2013. It passed the House on June 3, 2013 by a vote of 390-12, recorded in Roll Call Vote 185.

== See also ==
- List of bills in the 113th United States Congress
- Animal drugs
- Veterinary medicine in the United States
- Federal Food, Drug, and Cosmetic Act
