= International Science and Technology Cooperation Act of 2014 =

- Long title: To provide for the establishment of a body to identify and coordinate international science and technology cooperation that can strengthen the domestic science and technology enterprise and support United States foreign policy goals.
- Announced in: the 113th United States Congress
- Sponsored by: Rep. Daniel Lipinski (D, IL-3)
- Number of co-sponsors: 7

Codification
- Agencies affected: United States Department of State, Office of Science and Technology Policy

Legislative history
- Introduced in the House as H.R. 5029 by Rep. Daniel Lipinski (D, IL-3) on July 8, 2014; Committee consideration by United States House Committee on Science, Space and Technology; Passed the House on July 14, 2014 (Roll Call Vote 406: 346-41)

The International Science and Technology Cooperation Act of 2014 (H.R. 5029) is a bill that creates an organization under the National Science and Technology Council "with the responsibility to identify and coordinate international science and technology cooperation that can strengthen the United States science and technology enterprise, improve economic and national security, and support United States foreign policy goals."

The bill was introduced and passed in the United States House of Representatives during the 113th United States Congress.

== Provisions of the bill ==
According to a press release from the House Committee on Science, the bill "works to identify and coordinate international science and technology cooperation that can strengthen the U.S. science and technology enterprise, improve economic and natural security and support U.S. foreign policy goals." According to Rep. Lipinski, who introduced it, the bill "directs the National Science and Technology Council (NSTC) at the White House to maintain a body that would identify and coordinate the U.S. interagency strategy for international science and technology cooperation." The NSTC would then have to report back to Congress about its activities.

== Procedural history ==
The International Science and Technology Cooperation Act of 2014 was introduced into the United States House of Representatives on July 8, 2014 by Rep. Daniel Lipinski (D, IL-3). It was referred to the United States House Committee on Science, Space and Technology. On July 14, 2014, the House voted in Roll Call Vote 406 to pass the bill 346-41.

== Debate and discussion ==
According to Rep. Lipinski, who introduced the bill, "while many federal agencies are engaged with international partners on science and technology projects, there is a need to coordinate these projects across the federal government and to identify opportunities for additional beneficial collaborations."

== See also ==
- List of bills in the 113th United States Congress
- Science policy of the United States
