= Fruit Height Lands Conveyance Act =

Fruit Heights Land Conveyance Act
- Long title: To provide for the conveyance of certain parcels of National Forest System land to the city of Fruit Heights, Utah.
- Announced in: the 113th United States Congress
- Sponsored by: Rep. Rob Bishop (R, UT-1)
- Number of co-sponsors: 1

Codification
- Agencies affected: United States Department of Agriculture,

[H.R. 993 Legislative history]
- Introduced in the House as H.R. 993 by Rep. Rob Bishop (R-UT) on March 6, 2013; Committee consideration by United States House Committee on Natural Resources, United States House Natural Resources Subcommittee on Public Lands and Environmental Regulation; Passed the House on June 11, 2013 (voice vote)

The Fruit Height Lands Conveyance Act (H.R. 993) is a bill that was introduced in the 113th United States Congress that would transfer 100 acres of land that currently belongs to the United States Forest Service to the city of Fruit Heights, Utah. The bill passed in the United States House of Representatives on June 11, 2013.

== Background ==
The city in question, Fruit Heights, Utah, is currently surrounded by federal land and unable to expand or build a community cemetery. This legislation would change this.

== Provisions/Elements of the bill ==
H.R. 993 would direct the United States Department of Agriculture to convey, without consideration, certain lands in Utah to the town of Fruit Heights City. Based on information from the Forest Service, the Congressional Budget Office estimates that implementing the legislation would have no significant impact on the federal budget. Enacting H.R. 993 would not affect direct spending or revenues; therefore, pay-as-you-go procedures do not apply.

Under the bill, the Secretary of Agriculture would be required to convey about 100 acres of land within the Uinta-Wasatch-Cache National Forest to Fruit Heights City, Utah. The conveyed land could be used by the town for public purposes only and would revert to the federal government if used for other purposes. The affected lands do not currently generate offsetting receipts for the federal government and are not expected to generate such receipts over the next 10 years. Any costs to survey the affected lands would be paid by the town.

== Procedural history ==
=== House ===
The Fruit Heights Land Conveyance Act was introduced into the House by Rep. Rob Bishop (R-UT) on March 6, 2013. It was referred to the United States House Committee on Natural Resources and the United States House Natural Resources Subcommittee on Public Lands and Environmental Regulation. On June 11, 2013, the Fruit Heights Land Conveyance Act passed the House by a voice vote.

== See also ==
- List of bills in the 113th United States Congress
- Fruit Heights, Utah
