= Congressional Award Program Reauthorization Act of 2013 =

- Long title: To reauthorize the Congressional Award Act.
- Announced in: the 113th United States Congress
- Sponsored by: Senator Tom Carper (D-DE)
- Number of co-sponsors: 1

Codification
- Acts affected: Congressional Award Act
- U.S.C. sections affected: 2 U.S.C. § 808

Legislative history
- Introduced in the Senate as S. 1348 by Senator Tom Carper (D-DE) on July 23, 2013; Committee consideration by United States Senate Committee on Homeland Security and Governmental Affairs, United States House Committee on Education and the Workforce; Passed the Senate on September 26, 2013 (unanimous consent)

The Congressional Award Program Reauthorization Act of 2013 (S. 1348) is a bill that was introduced into the United States Senate during the 113th United States Congress. The bill would reauthorize the Congressional Award Act of 1979 by once again extending the scheduled date of termination until 2018. The Congressional Award Program recognizes excellence in public service and personal development among young people. The program gives awards to Americans between the ages of 14 and 23 years old for achieving goals they individually set in four areas: Volunteer Public Service, Personal Development, Physical Fitness, and Expedition/Exploration.

== Provisions of the bill ==
The Congressional Award Program Reauthorization Act of 2013 would reauthorize the Congressional Award Act by changing the date of the termination of the program, currently October 1, 2013 (found in 2 U.S.C. § 808), to October 1, 2018, an extension of five years.

The Congressional Award was established in 1979 in order to "recognize initiative, achievement and service in young people."

== Congressional Budget Office report ==
This summary is based largely on the summary provided by the Congressional Budget Office, a public domain source, as ordered reported by the Senate Committee on Homeland Security and Governmental Affairs on July 31, 2013.

S. 1348 would extend authorization for the Congressional Award Act through fiscal year 2018. The Congressional Award Program recognizes excellence in public service and personal development among young people. The program is overseen by the Congressional Award Board, a nonprofit organization that does not receive any appropriated federal funds.

Under S. 1348, the Congressional Award Board would continue to receive free office space in a Congressional office building. In addition, young people recognized by the Congressional Award Program are awarded medals produced by the U.S. Mint. Based on information from the board, the Congressional Budget Office (CBO) estimates that extending authorization for the program would increase direct spending from the U.S. Mint Public Enterprise Fund by less than $500,000 annually. Because the bill would affect direct spending, pay-as-you-go procedures apply.

== Procedural history ==
=== Senate ===
The Congressional Award Program Reauthorization Act of 2013 was introduced into the United States Senate on July 23, 2013 by Senator Tom Carper (D-DE). It was referred to the United States Senate Committee on Homeland Security and Governmental Affairs, which reported the bill alongside Senate Report 113-109. On September 26, 2013, the Senate voted by unanimous consent to pass the bill.

=== House ===
The Congressional Award Program Reauthorization Act of 2013 was received in the United States House of Representatives on September 27, 2013 and referred to the United States House Committee on Education and the Workforce. On September 30, 2013, newspaper The Hill reported that the House was expected to consider S. 1348 under a suspension of the rules later that day.

=== White House ===
On October 4, 2013, President Barack Obama signed this bill into law renewing it until 2018.

== See also ==
- List of bills in the 113th United States Congress
- Congressional Award
