= H.R. 3786 (113th Congress) =

- Long title: To direct the Administrator of General Services, on behalf of the Archivist of the United States, to convey certain Federal property located in the State of Alaska to the Municipality of Anchorage, Alaska.
- Announced in: the 113th United States Congress
- Sponsored by: Rep. Don Young (R, AK-0)
- Number of co-sponsors: 0

Codification
- Agencies affected: General Services Administration, National Archives and Records Administration

Legislative history
- Introduced in the House as H.R. 3786 by Rep. Don Young (R, AK-0) on December 16, 2013; Committee consideration by United States House Committee on Transportation and Infrastructure, United States House Transportation Subcommittee on Economic Development, Public Buildings and Emergency Management

The bill H.R. 3786 is legislation that would allow the federal government to sell nine acres of land and the building on it to the city of Anchorage, Alaska. The land is currently owned and used by the National Archives and Records Administration to store "ongoing federal records and Alaska records dating back to its purchase in 1867."

The bill was introduced into the United States House of Representatives during the 113th United States Congress.

== Background ==
The records available at the archives include "textual documents, architectural drawings, maps, photographs and microfilm" and had not been cataloged.

== Provisions of the bill ==
This summary is based largely on the summary provided by the Congressional Research Service, a public domain source.

The bill would direct the Administrator of the General Services Administration (GSA), on behalf of the Archivist of the United States, to convey to the City of Anchorage, Alaska, property in such city consisting of approximately nine acres and improvements located at 400 East Fortieth Street for not less than fair market value. The bill would make the net proceeds from such conveyance available to the Archivist to fund repairs and restorations conducted by the National Archives and Records Administration (NARA).

== Congressional Budget Office report ==
This summary is based largely on the summary provided by the Congressional Budget Office, as ordered reported by the House Committee on Transportation and Infrastructure on March 13, 2014. This is a public domain source.

H.R. 3786 would authorize the General Services Administration, on behalf of the National Archives and Records Administration (NARA) to sell certain property in Anchorage, Alaska, for fair market value. Proceeds from the sale would be available to be spent by NARA, subject to future appropriation.

The Congressional Budget Office (CBO) estimates that enacting this legislation would have no significant effect on the federal budget because we expect that the conveyance of this property will occur under current law. Based on information from NARA, it is expected that the property would be sold over the next ten years because the agency has recently announced plans to close its operating facilities in Alaska. Because this legislation would accelerate the process of selling the property, the collection of sale proceeds (which are offsetting receipts, an offset to direct spending) also would be accelerated. Therefore, pay-as-you-go procedures apply. However, the CBO estimated the effect on offsetting receipts over the 2014-2024 period would be negligible. Enacting the bill would not affect revenues.

H.R. 3786 contains no intergovernmental or private-sector mandates as defined in the Unfunded Mandates Reform Act and would impose no costs on state, local, or tribal governments.

== Procedural history ==
H.R. 3786 was introduced into the United States House of Representatives on December 16, 2014 by Rep. Don Young (R, AK-0). The bill was referred to the United States House Committee on Transportation and Infrastructure and the United States House Transportation Subcommittee on Economic Development, Public Buildings and Emergency Management. It was reported (amended) by the Committee on Transportation on April 9, 2014 alongside House Report 113-407. The House was scheduled to vote on the bill under a suspension of the rules on June 17, 2014.

== Debate and discussion ==
One opponent of the bill focused primarily on his opposition to the NARA closing its only facility in Alaska, arguing that "it is disrespectful of Alaska to attempt to balance the NARA budget by closing the Alaska National Archives facility and selling off the permanent site."

== See also ==
- List of bills in the 113th United States Congress
