= H.R. 2576 (113th Congress) =

- Long title: To amend title 49, United States Code, to modify requirements relating to the availability of pipeline safety regulatory documents, and for other purposes.
- Announced in: the 113th United States Congress
- Sponsored by: Rep. Jeff Denham (R, CA-10)
- Number of co-sponsors: 3

Codification
- U.S.C. sections affected: 49 U.S.C. § 60102(p),

[H.R. 2576 Legislative history]
- Introduced in the House as H.R. 2576 by Rep. Jeff Denham (R-CA) on June 28, 2013; Committee consideration by United States House Committee on Transportation and Infrastructure, United States House Transportation Subcommittee on Railroads, Pipelines, and Hazardous Materials, United States House Committee on Energy and Commerce, United States Senate Committee on Commerce, Science, and Transportation; Passed the House on July 16, 2013 (Roll Call 354: 405-2)

H.R. 2576 (long title: To amend title 49, United States Code, to modify requirements relating to the availability of pipeline safety regulatory documents, and for other purposes) is a bill that was introduced in the United States House of Representatives during the 113th United States Congress. The bill "would amend U.S. law dealing with protecting intellectual property rights for standards-setting groups relating to pipeline safety."

== Background ==
On January 3, 2012, Congress passed the Pipeline Safety, Regulatory Certainty, and Job Creation Act of 2011 (112-90, H.R. 2845). One provision of this law "required that all technological standards incorporated by reference in guidelines and regulation to be available free of charge on the internet." The technology standards in question related to pipeline safety. Many of these technical standards are created by Standards Development Organizations (SDOs). The law mandated that if any of the standards created by these organizations were used or referenced in the Pipeline and Hazardous Materials Safety Administration's guidelines or regulations, the standards had to be put on the internet and available for free. This created a conflict by requiring these SDOs to give up trade secrets and lose revenue from selling their standards. This, in turn, might have prevented them from continuing to update and develop new standards.

== Provisions/Elements of the bill ==
H.R. 2576 makes three main changes to the Pipeline Safety, Regulatory Certainty, and Job Creation Act of 2011. First, it extends the deadline from 1 year to 3 years to give the pipeline industry and the Pipeline and Hazardous Materials Safety Administration more time to organize and release these standards in a public manner. Second, it removes the word "guidance" from the law, which would reduce the number of documents that must be available online by limiting the law to requiring only the actual standards. Finally, H.R. 2576 would remove the phrase "on an internet website" from the law, which would allow the industry and the Pipeline and Hazardous Materials Safety Administration to determine an alternate way to still grant access to the standards documents without forcing them to be freely available on the web.

== Procedural history ==
=== House ===
H.R. 2576 was introduced into the House by Rep. Jeff Denham (R-CA) on June 28, 2013. It was referred to the United States House Committee on Transportation and Infrastructure, the United States House Transportation Subcommittee on Railroads, Pipelines, and Hazardous Materials, and the United States House Committee on Energy and Commerce. It was reported by the Committee on Transportation and Infrastructure on July 16, 2013, alongside House Report 113-152 part 1. The House voted on July 16, 2013, to pass the bill with a vote of 405-2 (Roll Call Vote 354).

=== Senate ===
H.R. 2576 was received in the United States Senate on July 17, 2013 and referred to the United States Senate Committee on Commerce, Science, and Transportation.

== Debate and discussion ==
House Republicans were in favor of the bill. According to their Legislative Digest, the provision, as it stands, "has the potential to infringe upon the intellectual property rights of Standards Development Organizations (SDOs) and would allow overseas competitors free access to intellectual property, which could hurt the income stream of SDOs."

== See also ==
- List of bills in the 113th United States Congress
- Pipeline and Hazardous Materials Safety Administration
