= Natural Gas Pipeline Permitting Reform Act =

- Long title: To provide for the timely consideration of all licenses, permits, and approvals required under Federal law with respect to the siting, construction, expansion, or operation of any natural gas pipeline projects.
- Announced in: the 113th United States Congress
- Sponsored by: Rep. Mike Pompeo (R, KS-4)
- Number of co-sponsors: 4

Codification
- Acts affected: Natural Gas Act
- U.S.C. sections affected: 15 U.S.C. § 717f
- Agencies affected: Federal Energy Regulatory Commission

Legislative history
- Introduced in the House as H.R. 161 by Rep. Mike Pompeo (R, KS-4) on May 9, 2013; Committee consideration by United States House Committee on Energy and Commerce, United States House Energy Subcommittee on Energy and Power

The Natural Gas Pipeline Permitting Reform Act is a bill that would place a 12-month deadline on the Federal Energy Regulatory Commission to approve or reject any proposal for a natural gas pipeline. It was first introduced into the United States House of Representatives during the 113th United States Congress (H.R. 1900), and passed the House. It was again introduced during the 114th United States CongressH.R. 161 in January 2015 by Rep. Mike Pompeo (R, KS-4), passed the House on January 21.

== Provisions of the bill ==
This summary is based largely on the summary provided by the Congressional Research Service, a public domain source.

The Natural Gas Pipeline Permitting Reform Act would amend the Natural Gas Act to direct the Federal Energy Regulatory Commission (FERC) to approve or deny a certificate of public convenience and necessity for a prefiled project within 12 months after receiving a complete application that is ready to be processed. If FERC failed to approve or deny the permit, within the 12 months, the license, permit would automatically be approved 30 days later.

"Prefiled project" is defined as a natural gas pipeline project to which FERC has assigned a prefiling docket number for obtaining a certificate of public convenience and necessity.

The bill would require the agency responsible for issuing any federal license, permit, or approval regarding the siting, construction, expansion, or operation of the gas pipeline(for example Clean Water Act or Clean Air Act related permits) to approve or deny it within 90 days after the FERC issues its final environmental document regarding the project.

The bill would require the FERC to grant an agency request for a 30-day extension of the 90-day time period if the agency demonstrates that it cannot otherwise complete the process required to approve or deny the license, permit, or approval, and therefore will be compelled to deny it.

The bill would direct the FERC to incorporate into the terms of a license, permit, or approval any conditions proffered by the agency that the FERC does not find to be inconsistent with the final environmental document.

== Congressional Budget Office report ==
This summary is based largely on the summary provided by the Congressional Budget Office, as ordered reported by the House Committee on Energy and Commerce on July 17, 2013. This is a public domain source.

Under section 7 of the Natural Gas Act, the Federal Energy Regulatory Commission (FERC) reviews applications to construct and operate interstate natural gas pipelines. Decisions pertaining to such applications depend on regulatory activities carried out by a variety of other federal agencies, as well as state and local governments pursuant to various other laws. H.R. 1900 would amend the Natural Gas Act to require FERC and other affected agencies to complete regulatory activities and reviews within timeframes specified in the bill.

Based on information from the FERC and other federal agencies that regulate aspects of interstate natural gas pipelines, the Congressional Budget Office (CBO) estimated that implementing H.R. 1900 would have no significant impact on the federal budget. The bill would not affect the scope of federal agencies’ responsibilities in overseeing such pipelines, and the CBO expects that meeting the timeframes specified in the bill would not require a significant change in the level of discretionary funding provided to affected agencies to meet their regulatory functions.

== Procedural history ==
Rep. Mike Pompeo (R, KS-4) first introduced the Natural Gas Pipeline Permitting Reform Act into the United States House of Representatives on May 9, 2013. It was referred to the United States House Committee on Energy and Commerce and the United States House Energy Subcommittee on Energy and Power. The Subcommittee held a hearing about the bill on July 8, 2013, and marked up the bill on July 10 and July 11, 2013. The full Committee considered and markedup the bill further on July 16 . On July 17, 2013, the Committee ordered the bill reported (amended) by a vote of 28-14. On November 15, 2013, House Majority Leader Eric Cantor announced that the bill would be considered on November 21, 2013. On November 18, 2013, the bill was reported (amended).

Mike Paesano reintroduced the bill as HR 161 in the House on January 6, 2015, which passed on January 22,2015 and went to the Senate.

== Debate and discussion ==
In 2013, the National Taxpayers Union was in favor of the bill and urged Representatives to vote yes because "by smoothing the regulatory hurdles and creating an environment of certainty for investors, H.R. 1900 would give consumers increased access to low-cost energy options and spur job-growth in an essential sector of our economy."

The Army Corps of Engineers, Environmental Protection Agency, Bureau of Land Management, and Fish and Wildlife Service all agencies that would implement the law, raised concerns about the bill.

President Barack Obama and his staff opposed the bill, and the president threatened to veto it. The Administration argued that "the bill's requirements could force agencies to make decisions based on incomplete information or information that may not be available within the stringent deadlines, and to deny applications that otherwise would have been approved, but for lack of sufficient review time."

One dispute centered on how long it currently takes the Federal Energy Regulatory Commission to approve permits. The President stated, that the "FERC has reported that, since fiscal year 2009, it has completed action on 92 percent (504 out of 548) of all pipeline applications that it has received within one year of receipt." The National Taxpayers Union, on the other hand, cites a contradictory source, saying that "a Government Accountability Office (GAO) report from February 2013 found that the many stages and steps of the permitting process, that often vary from state to state, can quickly bog down projects. The GAO explains that 'for those projects that were approved from January 2010 to January 2012, the average time from pre-filing to certification was 558 days...'"

== See also ==
- List of bills in the 113th United States Congress
