= Veterans' Advisory Committee on Education Improvement Act of 2013 =

2013 U.S legal bill

- Long title: To amend title 38, United States Code, to provide for a two-year extension of the Veterans’ Advisory Committee on Education.
- Announced in: the 113th United States Congress
- Sponsored by: Rep. John K. Delaney (D, MD-6)
- Number of co-sponsors: 1

Codification
- U.S.C. sections affected: 38 U.S.C. § 3692

Legislative history
- Introduced in the House as H.R. 2011 by Rep. John K. Delaney (D, MD-6) on May 16, 2013; Committee consideration by United States House Committee on Veterans' Affairs, United States House Veterans' Affairs Subcommittee on Economic Opportunity; Passed the House on October 28, 2013 (Roll Call Vote 562: 404-2)

The Veterans' Advisory Committee on Education Improvement Act of 2013 (H.R. 2011) is a bill that would extend through the end of 2015 the Veterans' Advisory Committee on Education. It would also change the composition of people sitting on that board by including members from more recent wars. Committee members include veterans from various wars and experts in fields such as education and management. The bill was introduced into the United States House of Representatives during the 113th United States Congress.

== Provisions of the bill ==
This summary is based largely on the summary provided by the Congressional Research Service, a public domain source.

The Veterans' Advisory Committee on Education Improvement Act of 2013 would extend through the end of 2015 the Veterans' Advisory Committee on Education. It would also require the Committee to include veterans representative of the post-9/11 operations in Iraq and Afghanistan.

== Congressional Budget Office report ==
This summary is based largely on the summary provided by the Congressional Budget Office, as ordered reported by the House Committee on Veterans’ Affairs on August 1, 2013. This is a public domain source.

H.R. 2011 would extend the Secretary of Veterans Affairs’ authority to operate the Veterans’ Advisory Committee on Education through December 31, 2015. Under current law, that authority expires December 31, 2013. The Committee meets annually to provide advice and recommendations to the Secretary on the administration of education and training programs for veterans and other eligible individuals. The bill also would modify the composition of the Committee to include veterans of recent operations in Iraq and Afghanistan and representatives of institutions that furnish vocational rehabilitation services to veterans.

Based on information from the Department of Veterans Affairs, the Congressional Budget Office (CBO) estimates that implementing H.R. 2011 would cost less than $500,000 over the 2014-2018 period, assuming the availability of appropriated funds. Enacting the bill would not affect direct spending or revenues; therefore, pay-as-you-go procedures do not apply.

== Procedural history ==
=== House ===
The Veterans' Advisory Committee on Education Improvement Act of 2013 was introduced on May 16, 2013 by Rep. John K. Delaney (D, MD-6). It was referred to the United States House Committee on Veterans' Affairs and the United States House Veterans' Affairs Subcommittee on Economic Opportunity. It was reported alongside House Report 113-211. On October 25, 2013, House Majority Leader Eric Cantor announced that H.R. 2011 would be on the House schedule for the week of October 28, 2013. It was scheduled for a vote on October 28, 2013 under a suspension of the rules. The House was expected to deal with six different bills related to Veterans all on the same day, including this bill. On October 28, 2013, the House voted in Roll Call Vote 562 to pass the bill 404-2.

== Debate and discussion ==
The non-profit Student Veterans of America issued a press release on August 7, 2013, announcing their support for H.R. 2011.

== See also ==
- List of bills in the 113th United States Congress
- Post-9/11 Veterans Educational Assistance Act of 2008
