= An Act to exempt a particular class of securities from the Securities and Exchange Act =

- Long title: To amend a provision of the Securities Act of 1933 directing the Securities and Exchange Commission to add a particular class of securities to those exempted under such Act to provide a deadline for such action.
- Announced in: the 113th United States Congress
- Sponsored by: Rep. Patrick T. McHenry (R, NC-10)
- Number of co-sponsors: 4

Codification
- Acts affected: Securities Act of 1933
- U.S.C. sections affected: 15 U.S.C. § 77c(b)(2),
- Agencies affected: U.S. Securities and Exchange Commission

Legislative history
- Introduced in the House as H.R. 701 by Rep. Patrick McHenry (R-NC) on February 14, 2013; Committee consideration by United States House Committee on Financial Services

The bill H.R. 701, (H.R. 701) an act to amend a provision of the Securities Act of 1933 directing the Securities and Exchange Commission to add a particular class of securities to those exempted under such Act to provide a deadline for such action, was a bill introduced into the United States House of Representatives in the 113th United States Congress. It was introduced on February 14, 2013 by Rep. Patrick McHenry (R-NC). The bill would amend the Securities Act of 1933 to set a new deadline regarding domestic securities for the Securities and Exchange Commission (SEC).

== Provisions/Elements of the bill ==
This summary is based largely on the summary provided by the Congressional Research Service, a public domain source.

H.R. 701 would amend the Securities Act of 1933 to set October 31, 2013, as the deadline for the Securities and Exchange Commission (SEC) to add a class of domestic securities to those already exempted from regulation under the Securities Act of 1933. This would have to be done in accordance with a few specified terms and conditions. First, that the aggregate offering amount of all securities offered and sold within the prior 12-month period in reliance on the new exemption shall not exceed $50 million. Second, that the securities may be offered and sold publicly. Finally, that they shall not be restricted securities under federal securities laws and regulations.

== Procedural history ==
=== House ===
H.R. 701 was introduced into the House of Representatives by Rep. Patrick McHenry (R-NC) on February 14, 2013. It was referred to the United States House Committee on Financial Services, which marked it up on May 7, 2013. The House Majority Leader Eric Cantor announced on Friday May 10, 2013, that H.R. 1580 would be considered the following week.

== Debate and discussion ==
According to one source, the reason for this act is to force the SEC to take action instead of continuing to delay on finalizing new "Regulation A" rules created by the Jumpstart Our Business Startups Act (JOBS Act) passed in April 2012. The rules would make it easier for small businesses to get start-up capital, but have been delayed by the failure of the FEC to write the actual rules and guidelines for the process.

== See also ==
- Jumpstart Our Business Startups Act (JOBS Act)
- List of bills in the 113th United States Congress
- Securities Act of 1933
- Securities and Exchange Commission (SEC)
