= H.R. 1864 (113th Congress) =

Proposed U.S bill

- Long title: To amend title 10, United States Code, to require an Inspector General investigation of allegations of retaliatory personnel actions taken in response to making protected communications regarding sexual assault.
- Announced in: the 113th United States Congress
- Sponsored by: Rep. Jackie Walorski (R, IN-2)
- Number of co-sponsors: 111

Codification
- U.S.C. sections affected: 10 U.S.C. § 1034(c)(2)(A), 10 U.S.C. §§ 920–920c

[H.R. 1864 Legislative history]
- Introduced in the House as H.R. 1864 by Rep. Jackie Walorski (R-IN) on May 7, 2013; Committee consideration by United States House Committee on Armed Services, United States House Armed Services Subcommittee on Military Personnel

The bill entitled To amend title 10, United States Code, to require an Inspector General investigation of allegations of retaliatory personnel actions taken in response to making protected communications regarding sexual assault (H.R. 1864) is a bill that would change some of the investigative procedures surrounding accusations of sexual assault in the United States military. It was introduced into the United States House of Representatives during the 113th United States Congress.

The bill is a reaction to an increase in sexual assaults taking place in the military, an increase of more than a third between 2010 and 2012. In 2012, there were an estimated 26,000 assaults, with exact numbers unknown because many people still fear the consequences of reporting what happened to them. Currently, the Inspector General is required to investigate whether sexual harassment reports led to retaliatory actions against the person making the report. This bill, if passed, would expand those investigations to include looking at whether retaliatory action also happened in response to report of rape, sexual assault, or sexual misconduct.

== Provisions/Elements of the bill ==
This summary is based largely on the summary provided by the Congressional Research Service, a public domain source.

If passed, the bill would require the Inspector General of the Department of Defense (DOD), the Department of Homeland Security (DHS) with respect to the Coast Guard, or any of the military departments to investigate allegations of retaliatory personnel actions taken in response to making protected communications to such Inspector General regarding alleged instances of rape, sexual assault, or other forms of sexual misconduct in violation of the Uniform Code of Military Justice.

== Procedural history ==
H.R. 1864 was introduced into the House on May 7, 2013 by Rep. Jackie Walorski (R-IN). It was immediately referred to the United States House Committee on Armed Services and was sent to the United States House Armed Services Subcommittee on Military Personnel on June 20, 2013. On June 21, 2013, House Majority Leader Eric Cantor announced that H.R. 1864 would be on the floor calendar for the week of June 24.

== See also ==
- List of bills in the 113th United States Congress – List of proposed federal laws introduced in the 113th United States Congress
- Uniform Code of Military Justice – United States military law
