= Keep Your Health Plan Act of 2013 =

- Long title: To authorize health insurance issuers to continue to offer for sale current individual health insurance coverage in satisfaction of the minimum essential health insurance coverage requirement, and for other purposes.
- Announced in: the 113th United States Congress
- Sponsored by: Fred Upton
- Number of co-sponsors: 161

Legislative history
- Introduced in the House as H.R. 3350 by Fred Upton on October 28, 2013; Committee consideration by United States House Committee on Energy and Commerce, United States House Committee on Ways and Means; Passed the House on November 15, 2013 (Roll Call Vote 587: 261-157)

The Keep Your Health Plan Act of 2013 (H.R. 3350) is a bill that would permit insurance companies forced to cancel existing insurance plans that do not meet Affordable Care Act rules to continue offering those plans during 2014. The bill is intended to "make good on President Obama's promise that 'if you like your health plan, you can keep it.'"

It was introduced into the United States House of Representatives during the 113th United States Congress.

== Background ==
The Obama administration announced on November 12, 2013, that in October 2013 only 27,000 people had been able to use HealthCare.gov to purchase insurance from the federal government.

== Provisions of the bill ==
This summary is based largely on the summary provided by the Congressional Research Service, a public domain source.

The Keep Your Health Plan Act of 2013 would permit a health insurance issuer that has in effect health insurance coverage in the individual market as of January 1, 2013, to continue offering such coverage for sale during 2014 outside of a health care exchange established under the Patient Protection and Affordable Care Act. The bill would treat such coverage as a grandfathered health plan for purposes of an individual meeting the requirement to maintain minimum essential health coverage.

== Procedural history ==
The Keep Your Health Plan Act of 2013 was introduced into the United States House of Representatives on October 28, 2013, by Rep. Fred Upton (R-MI). It was referred to the United States House Committee on Energy and Commerce and the United States House Committee on Ways and Means. On November 8, 2013, House Majority Leader Eric Cantor announced that the Keep Your Health Plan Act of 2013 would be considered during the week of November 11, 2013. The House was scheduled to vote on it on November 15, 2013. On November 15, the House passed the bill 261–157, with 39 Democrats voting with the Republicans in favor of it.

== Debate and discussion ==
Rep. Martha Roby spoke in favor of the bill and urged other members of the House to vote in favor of it.

Opponents argue that the bill would make the situation worse by increasing the complications of Obamacare implementation. The actions that prompted this bill – cancellation of existing insurance plans – have already occurred. People have been notified, computer systems have changed, and these now-cancelled plans have not been refiled with the regulatory agencies of the various states. Opponents argue that this situation makes it difficult or impossible for insurance companies to undo the policy cancellations made in preparation for Obamacare.

== Subsequent criticism ==
President Obama's promise and the subsequent legislation aimed to allow American citizens to keep their healthcare plan were widely seen as promises that could not be kept. Obama's statement "if you like your healthcare plan you can keep it..." was later dubbed "Lie of the Year" by PolitiFact.com.

== See also ==
- List of bills in the 113th United States Congress
