= H.R. 2449 (113th Congress) =

2013 bill

- Long title: To authorize the President to extend the term of the Agreement for Cooperation between the Government of the United States of America and the Government of the Republic of Korea Concerning Civil Uses of Nuclear Energy for a period not to exceed March 19, 2016.
- Announced in: the 113th United States Congress
- Sponsored by: Rep. Edward R. Royce (R, CA-39)
- Number of co-sponsors: 6

Codification
- Agencies affected: Executive Office of the President,

Legislative history
- Introduced in the House as H.R. 2449 by Rep. Edward R. Royce (R, CA-39) on June 20, 2013; Committee consideration by United States House Committee on Foreign Affairs,

H.R. 2449, (full name being "To authorize the President to extend the term of the Agreement for Cooperation between the Government of the United States of America and the Government of the Republic of Korea Concerning Civil Uses of Nuclear Energy for a period not to exceed March 19, 2016"), is a bill that was introduced into the United States House of Representatives during the 113th United States Congress. H.R. 2449 would authorize the President of the United States to extend the current nuclear cooperation agreement with the Republic of Korea for up to two years. That agreement was scheduled to expire in March 2014. Under the Atomic Energy Act of 1954, such agreements are required for U.S. companies to be permitted to export commercial nuclear materials, technologies, and services to foreign nations. Extending the agreement would maintain ongoing civil nuclear cooperation with the Republic of Korea, and allow joint commercial activities to continue.

== Provisions of the bill ==
This summary is based largely on the summary provided by the Congressional Research Service, a public domain source.

H.R. 2449 would authorize the President to extend the term of the "Agreement for Cooperation between the Government of the United States of America and the Government of the Republic of Korea Concerning Civil Uses of Nuclear Energy" for a period not to exceed March 19, 2016.

== Congressional Budget Office report ==
H.R. 2449 would authorize the President to extend the current nuclear cooperation agreement with the Republic of Korea for up to two years. That agreement was scheduled to expire in March 2014. Under the Atomic Energy Act of 1954, such agreements are required for U.S. companies to be permitted to export commercial nuclear materials, technologies, and services to foreign nations. Extending the agreement would maintain ongoing civil nuclear cooperation with the Republic of Korea, and allow joint commercial activities to continue.

CBO estimates that the issuance of export licenses and continued certification and reporting requirements under the two-year extension would cost less than $500,000 over the 2014-2018 period, subject to the availability of appropriated funds. Enacting H.R. 2449 would not affect direct spending or revenues; therefore, pay-as-you-go procedures do not apply.

== Procedural history ==
=== House ===
H.R. 2449 was introduced into the House on June 20, 2013, by Rep. Edward R. Royce (R, CA-39). It was referred to the United States House Committee on Foreign Affairs, which held consideration and markup on July 24, 2013, before voting by unanimous consent to report the bill. The House Majority Leader Eric Cantor placed the bill on the House Schedule on September 13, 2013, for consideration under a suspension of the rules on September 17.

== Debate and discussion ==
A policy paper released by the Heritage Foundation in March 2013 argued that a "failure to negotiate the extension would have substantial negative safety, technological, economic, and nonproliferation impacts on both countries."

== See also ==
- List of bills in the 113th United States Congress
- South Korea
- South Korea–United States relations
- Nuclear power in South Korea
