= H.R. 5108 (113th Congress) =

- Long title: To establish the Law School Clinic Certification Program of the United States Patent and Trademark Office, and for other purposes.
- Announced in: the 113th United States Congress
- Sponsored by: Rep. Hakeem S. Jeffries (D, NY-8)
- Number of co-sponsors: 1

Codification
- Agencies affected: United States Patent and Trademark Office

Legislative history
- Introduced in the House as H.R. 5108 by Rep. Hakeem S. Jeffries (D, NY-8) on July 15, 2014; Committee consideration by United States House Committee on the Judiciary; Passed the House on September 15, 2014 (Roll Call Vote 497: 327-22)

The bill H.R. 5108 would establish the Law School Clinic Certification Program of the United States Patent and Trademark Office (USPTO) to be available to accredited law schools for the 10-year period after enactment of this Act.

H.R. 5108 was introduced into the United States House of Representatives during the 113th United States Congress.

== Background ==
The United States Patent and Trademark Office (PTO or USPTO) is an agency in the U.S. Department of Commerce that issues patents to inventors and businesses for their inventions, and trademark registration for product and intellectual property identification. The USPTO is "unique among federal agencies because it operates solely on fees collected by its users, and not on taxpayer dollars". Its "operating structure is like a business in that it receives requests for services—applications for patents and trademark registrations—and charges fees projected to cover the cost of performing the services [it] provide[s]".

The PTO describes the existing Law School Clinic Certification pilot program as a program that "allows law students enrolled in a participating law school’s clinic program to practice Intellectual Property Law before the USPTO under the strict guidance of a Law School Faculty Clinic Supervisor."

== Provisions of the bill ==
This summary is based largely on the summary provided by the Congressional Research Service, a public domain source.

H.R. 5108 would establish the Law School Clinic Certification Program of the United States Patent and Trademark Office (USPTO) to be available to accredited law schools for the 10-year period after enactment of this Act. The bill would authorize the USPTO Director to establish regulations and procedures for application to and participation in such program.

== Congressional Budget Office report ==
This summary is based largely on the summary provided by the Congressional Budget Office, as ordered reported by the House Committee on the Judiciary on September 10, 2014. This is a public domain source.

The Congressional Budget Office (CBO) estimates that implementing H.R. 5108 would have a negligible effect on net discretionary spending over the 2015-2019 period. Enacting H.R. 5108 would not affect direct spending or revenues; therefore, pay-as-you-go procedures do not apply.

H.R. 5108 would authorize the Law School Clinic Certification Program at the Patent and Trademark Office (PTO) for 10 years after enactment of the bill. In 2008, PTO established the Law School Clinic Certification Pilot Program, which allows students at participating law schools to practice patent or trademark law before the agency under the guidance of a faculty supervisor in the school's law clinic. Currently, 45 schools participate in the program, which costs about $200,000 each year to operate.

Based on information from PTO, CBO expects that any additional actions the agency would take to implement H.R. 5108 would not have a significant effect on the agency's workload, and thus, its spending. In addition, PTO is authorized to collect fees sufficient to offset its operating expenses; therefore, CBO estimates that the net budgetary effect of implementing H.R. 5108 would be negligible, assuming appropriations actions consistent with the agency's authorities.

H.R. 5108 contains no intergovernmental or private-sector mandates as defined in the Unfunded Mandates Reform Act and would not affect the budgets of state, local, or tribal governments.

== Procedural history ==
H.R. 5108 was introduced into the United States House of Representatives on July 15, 2014, by Rep. Hakeem S. Jeffries (D, NY-8). The bill was referred to the United States House Committee on the Judiciary. It was reported alongside House Report 113-588 on September 15, 2014. The House voted in Roll Call Vote 497 on September 15, 2014, to pass the bill 327–22.

== See also ==
- List of bills in the 113th United States Congress
- United States trademark law
- Intellectual property
- United States patent law
