= H.R. 2871 (113th Congress) =

- Long title: To amend title 28, United States Code, to modify the composition of the southern judicial district of Mississippi to improve judicial efficiency, and for other purposes.
- Announced in: the 113th United States Congress
- Sponsored by: Rep. Howard Coble (R, NC-6)
- Number of co-sponsors: 3

Codification
- U.S.C. sections affected: 28 U.S.C. § 104

Legislative history
- Introduced in the House as H.R. 2871 by Rep. Howard Coble (R, NC-6) on July 31, 2013; Committee consideration by United States House Committee on the Judiciary, United States House Judiciary Subcommittee on Courts, Intellectual Property and the Internet; Passed the House on November 12, 2013 (401–0)

H.R. 2871, long title "to amend title 28, United States Code, to modify the composition of the southern judicial district of Mississippi to improve judicial efficiency, and for other purposes", is a bill that would change the southern judicial district in Mississippi from five divisions to four. The bill passed the United States House of Representatives 401–0 during the 113th United States Congress.

== Provisions of the bill ==
This summary is based largely on the summary provided by the Congressional Research Service, a public domain source.

H.R. 2871 would amend the federal judicial code to realign the southern judicial district of Mississippi into four (currently, five) divisions. The four divisions would be: the Northern Division at Jackson, the Southern Division at Gulfport, the Eastern Division at Hattiesburg, and the Western Division at Natchez. The bill would also set forth the Mississippi counties comprising each realigned division.

== Congressional Budget Office report ==
This summary is based largely on the summary provided by the Congressional Budget Office, as ordered reported by the House Committee on the Judiciary on September 11, 2013. This is a public domain source.

H.R. 2871 would consolidate the southern judicial district in the state of Mississippi from five divisions to four. Based on information provided by the Administrative Office of the United States Courts and the United States Department of Justice, the Congressional Budget Office (CBO) estimated that implementing the bill would have no significant impact on the federal budget. The courthouse in Meridian, Mississippi, is the sole courthouse for the existing eastern division and is scheduled to close under current law.

The CBO estimated that the cost of consolidation and any potential savings from operating fewer courthouses would not be significantly different from the costs to the district under the scheduled closing of the Meridian courthouse. Enacting H.R. 2871 would not affect direct spending or revenues; therefore, pay-as-you-go procedures do not apply.

H.R. 2871 contains no intergovernmental or private-sector mandates as defined in the Unfunded Mandates Reform Act and would not affect the budgets of state, local, or tribal governments.

== Procedural history ==
H.R. 2871 was introduced by Rep. Howard Coble (R, NC-6) on July 31, 2013. It was referred to the United States House Committee on the Judiciary and the United States House Judiciary Subcommittee on Courts, Intellectual Property and the Internet. On November 8, 2013, House Majority Leader Eric Cantor announced that H.R. 2871 would be considered under a suspension of the rules on the House floor on November 12, 2013. The bill would be considered along with five other bills, starting after the House opened for the day at 2pm. The House voted on November 12, 2013, to pass the bill 401–0.

== See also ==
- List of bills in the 113th United States Congress
