= Criminal Antitrust Anti-Retaliation Act of 2013 =

US law protecting whistleblowers

- Long title: To provide anti-retaliation protections for antitrust whistleblowers.
- Announced in: the 113th United States Congress
- Sponsored by: Sen. Patrick J. Leahy (D, VT)
- Number of co-sponsors: 1

Codification
- Acts affected: Antitrust Criminal Penalty Enhancement and Reform Act of 2004, Sherman Act, Clayton Act
- U.S.C. sections affected: 49 U.S.C. § 42121, 15 U.S.C. § 1, 15 U.S.C. § 12, 15 U.S.C. § 3
- Agencies affected: United States Department of Justice, United States Department of Labor

Legislative history
- Introduced in the Senate as S. 42 by Sen. Patrick J. Leahy (D, VT) on January 22, 2013; Committee consideration by United States Senate Committee on the Judiciary; Passed the Senate on November 4, 2013 (unanimous consent)

The Criminal Antitrust Anti-Retaliation Act of 2013 (S. 42) is a bill that would protect whistleblowers who report violations of United States antitrust law. The bill would have whistleblowers first file a retaliation claim with the United States Department of Labor before going to federal court. The bill passed the United States Senate during the 113th United States Congress.

== Background ==
The bill was written in response to a July 2011 report from the Government Accountability Office on whistleblowing and price fixing.

== Provisions of the bill ==
This summary is based largely on the summary provided by the Congressional Research Service, a public domain source.

The Criminal Antitrust Anti-Retaliation Act of 2013 would prohibit discharging or in any other manner discriminating against a whistleblower in terms and conditions of employment because: (1) the whistleblower provided information to the employer or the federal government concerning a violation of antitrust law or another criminal law committed in conjunction with a potential violation of antitrust law; or (2) the whistleblower participated in, or otherwise assisted, an investigation relating to such a violation.

The bill would allow a whistleblower who alleges discharge or other discrimination to seek relief: (1) by filing a complaint with the Secretary of Labor; or (2) if the Secretary has not issued a final decision within 180 days of filing such complaint, to bring an action at law or equity.

The bill would entitle a whistleblower who prevails in any such action to all relief necessary to make such whistleblower whole.

== Procedural history ==
=== Senate ===
The Criminal Antitrust Anti-Retaliation Act of 2013 was introduced into the Senate on January 22, 2013 by Sen. Patrick J. Leahy (D, VT). It was referred to the United States Senate Committee on the Judiciary. On November 4, 2013, the Senate voted to pass the bill with unanimous consent.

== Debate and discussion ==
The National Whistleblowers Center supported the bill and encouraged readers to write to their Senators about the bill. The executive director Stephen Kohn said that "this bill is a major step forward in plugging a loophole in the patchwork of whistleblower protection that currently exists."

== See also ==
- List of bills in the 113th United States Congress
