= Audit Integrity and Job Protection Act =

US legislation

- Long title: To amend the Sarbanes-Oxley Act of 2002 to prohibit the Public Company Accounting Oversight Board from requiring public companies to use specific auditors or require the use of different auditors on a rotating basis.
- Announced in: the 113th United States Congress
- Sponsored by: Rep. Robert Hurt (R, VA-5)
- Number of co-sponsors: 1

Codification
- Acts affected: Sarbanes-Oxley Act of 2002

[H.R. 1564 Legislative history]
- Introduced in the House as H.R. 1564 by Rep. Robert Hurt (R-VA) on April 15, 2013; Committee consideration by United States House Committee on Financial Services, United States House Financial Services Subcommittee on Capital Markets and Government-Sponsored Enterprises, United States Senate Committee on Banking, Housing, and Urban Affairs; Passed the House on July 8, 2013 (Roll Call Vote 306:321-62)

The Audit Integrity and Job Protection Act (H.R. 1564) is a bill that was introduced into the United States House of Representatives during the 113th United States Congress. The bill would "amend the Sarbanes-Oxley Act of 2002 (SOX) to deny the Public Company Accounting Oversight Board any authority to require that audits conducted for a particular issuer of securities in accordance with SOX standards be conducted by specific auditors, or that such audits be conducted for an issuer by different auditors on a rotating basis," according to a summary by the Congressional Research Service. The bill passed the House 321-62 on July 8, 2013.

== Background ==
In 2011, the Public Company Accounting Oversight Board (PCAOB) asked for public comments on a concept release they made about whether auditor term limits and rotations would actually improve auditor independence. As of June 2013, the PCAOB had not decided whether to move forward with the concept or abandon it.

== Provisions and elements of the bill ==
This summary is based largely on the summary provided by the Congressional Research Service, a public domain source.

The Audit Integrity and Job Protection Act would amend the Sarbanes-Oxley Act of 2002 (SOX) to deny the Public Company Accounting Oversight Board any authority to require that audits conducted for a particular issuer of securities in accordance with SOX standards be conducted by specific auditors, or that such audits be conducted for an issuer by different auditors on a rotating basis.

== Congressional Budget Office report ==
H.R. 1564 would prohibit the Public Company Accounting Oversight Board (PCAOB) from requiring public companies to use a specific auditor or to use different auditors on a rotating basis. The bill also would require the Government Accountability Office (GAO) to update a report completed in 2003 that reviewed the potential effects of mandatory rotation for auditing firms.

Based on information from the PCAOB, the Congressional Budget Office (CBO) estimates that enacting H.R. 1564 would not affect direct spending or revenues; therefore, pay-as-you-go procedures do not apply. The PCAOB has no immediate plans to issue a ruling specifying how public companies should choose a financial auditor; therefore, the prohibition in H.R. 1564 would not change its workload. Based on information about similar reporting efforts, CBO estimates that implementing H.R. 1564 would have a discretionary cost of about $1 million for the GAO to complete the required study and report.

H.R. 1564 contains no intergovernmental or private-sector mandates as defined in the Unfunded Mandates Reform Act and would not affect the budgets of state, local, or tribal governments.

== Procedural history ==
=== House ===
The Audit Integrity and Job Protection Act was introduced into the House on April 15, 2013 by Rep. Robert Hurt (R-VA). It was referred to the United States House Committee on Financial Services and the United States House Financial Services Subcommittee on Capital Markets and Government-Sponsored Enterprises. It was reported alongside House Report 113-142. On July 8, 2013, the House voted 321-62 to pass H.R. 1564 in Roll Call Vote 306.

=== Senate ===
The Audit Integrity and Job Protection Act was received in the United States Senate on July 9, 2013 and referred to the United States Senate Committee on Banking, Housing, and Urban Affairs.

== Debate and discussion ==
Lawmakers in favor of the bill argued that the bill is necessary because mandatory auditor rotations would be an expensive burden on businesses, cause significant disruptions, and would be generally "unworkable" due to the small number of auditing firms. Business groups also agreed that mandatory auditor rotations were a poor idea, since it would take time for the new auditor to learn the details of the business they were newly assigned to audit, lowering the quality of the audit.

Opponents of the bill argued that the current audit system has clear flaws that are not being addressed - that many public companies have long-term, close relationships with the firms that are supposed to be holding them accountable.

== See also ==
- List of bills in the 113th United States Congress
- Sarbanes-Oxley Act of 2002
- Public Company Accounting Oversight Board
- Financial audit
