= Organization of American States Revitalization and Reform Act of 2013 =

- Long title: To support revitalization and reform of the Organization of American States, and for other purposes.
- Announced in: the 113th United States Congress
- Sponsored by: Senator Bob Menendez (D-NJ)
- Number of co-sponsors: 3

Codification
- Agencies affected: United States Congress, Inter-American Development Bank, United States Department of State

Legislative history
- Introduced in the Senate as S. 793 by Senator Bob Menendez (D-NJ) on April 24, 2013; Committee consideration by United States Senate Committee on Foreign Relations, United States House Committee on Foreign Affairs; Passed the Senate on July 8, 2013 (unanimous consent); Signed into law by President Barack Obama on October 4, 2013

The Organization of American States Revitalization and Reform Act of 2013 (S. 793) is a bill that was introduced into the United States Senate during the 113th United States Congress. The Organization of American States Revitalization and Reform Act of 2013 would state that it is U.S. policy to: (1) promote democracy, the rule of law, and human rights in the Western Hemisphere; and (2) support the practices and principles expressed in the Charter of the Organization of American States, the American Declaration on the Rights and Duties of Man, the Inter-American Democratic Charter, and other fundamental instruments of democracy. S. 793 would then require the Secretary of State to develop a multiyear strategy to bolster the Organization of American States (OAS) and improve the OAS’s processes for managing its budget and personnel. The act would require the Secretary to provide quarterly briefings to the Congress on the progress of implementing that strategy.

"In early July [2013], the Senate approved the Organization of American States Revitalization and Reform Act of 2013 by unanimous consent. On Sept. 17, the House of Representatives passed the bill by a 383-24 vote, and it was signed into law by President Obama two weeks later," on October 4, 2013. "This bill became Pub.L. 113-41."

== Provisions of the bill ==
This summary is based largely on the summary provided by the Congressional Research Service, a public domain source.

The Organization of American States Revitalization and Reform Act of 2013 would state that it is U.S. policy to: (1) promote democracy, the rule of law, and human rights in the Western Hemisphere; and (2) support the practices and principles expressed in the Charter of the Organization of American States, the American Declaration on the Rights and Duties of Man, the Inter-American Democratic Charter, and other fundamental instruments of democracy. The bill would also expresse the sense of Congress that the Organization of American States (OAS) should be the primary multi-lateral diplomatic entity for regional dispute resolution and promotion of democratic governance.

The bill would direct the Secretary of State to submit to Congress a multiyear strategy that: (1) identifies a path toward the adoption of necessary reforms that prioritize the core competencies of the OAS, (2) outlines a results-based budgeting process to prioritize current and future mandates and transparent hiring and promotion practices, and (3) reflects the inputs and coordination from other executive branch agencies.

Finally, the bill would direct the Secretary to: (1) carry out diplomatic engagement to build support for reforms and budgetary burden sharing among OAS member states and observers, (2) promote donor coordination among OAS member states, and (3) help set OAS priorities.

== Congressional Budget Office report ==
This summary is based largely on the summary provided by the Congressional Budget Office, a public domain source, as ordered reported by the House Committee on Foreign Affairs on July 24, 2013.

S. 793 would require the Secretary of State to develop a multiyear strategy to bolster the Organization of American States (OAS) and improve the OAS’s processes for managing its budget and personnel. The act would require the Secretary to provide quarterly briefings to the Congress on the progress of implementing that strategy. The Congressional Budget Office (CBO) estimates that implementing S. 793 would have discretionary costs of less than $500,000 each year and that total $1 million over the 2014-2018 period, assuming the availability of appropriated funds. Pay-as-you-go procedures do not apply to this legislation because it would not affect direct spending or revenues.

S. 793 contains no intergovernmental or private-sector mandates as defined in the Unfunded Mandates Reform Act and would not affect the budgets of state, local, or tribal governments.

On May 23, 2013, CBO transmitted a cost estimate for S. 793 as ordered reported by the Senate Committee on Foreign Relations on May 14, 2013. The two versions of S. 793 are similar, and the estimated costs are the same.

== Procedural history ==
=== Senate ===
The Organization of American States Revitalization and Reform Act of 2013 was introduced into the Senate on April 24, 2013 by Senator Bob Menendez (D-NJ). It was referred to the United States Senate Committee on Foreign Relations. It was passed by the Senate without amendment by unanimous consent on July 8, 2013.

=== House ===
The Organization of American States Revitalization and Reform Act of 2013 was received in the United States House of Representatives on July 9, 2013. It was referred to the United States House Committee on Foreign Affairs. The House Majority Leader Eric Cantor placed the bill on the House Schedule on September 13, 2013 for consideration under a suspension of the rules on September 17.

== See also ==
- List of bills in the 113th United States Congress
- Organization of American States
