= H.R. 2942 (113th Congress) =

- Long title: To amend title 38, United States Code, to reestablish the Professional Certification and Licensure Advisory Committee of the Department of Veterans Affairs.
- Announced in: the 113th United States Congress
- Sponsored by: Rep. Ann Kirkpatrick (D, AZ-1)
- Number of co-sponsors: 0

Codification
- U.S.C. sections affected: 38 U.S.C. § 3689
- Agencies affected: United States Department of Veterans Affairs

Legislative history
- Introduced in the House as H.R. 2942 by Rep. Ann Kirkpatrick (D, AZ-1) on August 1, 2013; Committee consideration by United States House Committee on Veterans' Affairs, United States House Veterans' Affairs Subcommittee on Economic Opportunity

The bill H.R. 2942 is a bill that would reestablish the Professional Certification and Licensure Advisory Committee of the United States Department of Veterans Affairs which had previously ended in 2009. The Committee was involved in making recommendations regarding matching military certifications and equivalent civilian certifications so that veterans can smoothly shift into civilian life.

The bill was introduced into the United States House of Representatives during the 113th United States Congress.

== Provisions of the bill ==
This summary is based largely on the summary provided by the Congressional Research Service, a public domain source.

The bill would reestablish the Professional Certification and Licensure Advisory Committee of the Department of Veterans Affairs (VA) through December 31, 2019. (The Committee terminated on December 31, 2006.)

Under the new legislation, the committee would not terminate until December 31, 2019.

== Procedural history ==
H.R. 2942 was introduced into the United States House of Representatives on August 1, 2013 by Rep. Ann Kirkpatrick (D, AZ-1). The bill was referred to the United States House Committee on Veterans' Affairs and the United States House Veterans' Affairs Subcommittee on Economic Opportunity.

== Debate and discussion ==
The Department of Veterans Affairs supported the legislation. According to the VA's representatives who testified before Congress, the Secretary of Veterans Affairs would "be able to receive recommendations and seek advice from the Committee with regard to licensing and certification programs" if the Committee were reestablished.

The American Legion strongly supported the bill, arguing that the legislation would "benefit service members, as well as those who eventually employ veterans in civilian work-force easing the placement of qualified veterans in civilian careers, and matching civilian employers with skilled veteran employees." The American Legion argued that this committee was important to the process of matching military certifications with their corresponding civilian ones, smoothing that transition for veterans, and that the committee provided much needed expertise on these matters to the VA. The American Legion said that "there is a definite need to resume this independent body with expertise in matters relating to licensing and credentialing which can present new solutions to VA's senior leadership and congressional members as well as other stakeholders."

The Veterans of Foreign Wars (VFW) also supported the bill, calling the advisory committee "critical" and very important "at a time when the Department of Labor anticipates a significant influx of veterans into the civilian workforce."

== See also ==
- List of bills in the 113th United States Congress
