= Capital Access for Small Community Financial Institutions Act =

- Long title: To amend the Federal Home Loan Bank Act to allow non-Federally insured credit unions to become members of a Federal Home Loan Bank.

Codification
- Acts amended: Federal Home Loan Bank Act

Legislative history
- Introduced in the House by Steve Stivers (R–OH) on May 7, 2013; Committee consideration by House Financial Services Committee

The Capital Access for Small Community Financial Institutions Act (H.R. 1862) is a bill introduced in the U.S. Congress that would enable credit unions that are privately insured to become members in the Federal Home Loan Bank (FHLB) system. In March 2014, the bill was approved by the House Financial Services Committee by a unanimous vote of 55-0. The legislation amends parts of the Federal Home Loan Bank Act. Under current U.S. law, only credit unions that are federally insured can join the FHLB system.

== Purpose ==
The intent of the bill is to improve the U.S. housing market by reducing regulatory requirements to community credit unions. Some privately insured credit unions that serve public servants and small businesses have not been allowed to apply to the FHLB system

== Background ==
As of 2014, approximately 132 small credit unions, located among nine states, are insured by a mutual insurance company instead of the federal government. Although federal government insurance for credit unions began in 1970, some small credit unions remained privately insured.

== Cosponsors ==
Congresswoman Joyce Beatty and Congressman Andre Carson are cosponsors of the legislation.

== Support ==
Organizations that have said they support the bill include:

- National Association of Federal Credit Unions
- National Association of State Credit Union Supervisors

== Opposition ==
Some Democratic members of the Financial Services Committee and the National Credit Union Administration oppose the bill.

== See also ==
- Credit unions in the United States
- Federal Home Loan Bank Act
- List of bills in the 113th United States Congress
