= FISA Accountability and Privacy Protection Act of 2013 (S. 1215; 113th Congress) =

- Long title: To strengthen privacy protections, accountability, and oversight related to domestic surveillance conducted pursuant to the USA PATRIOT Act and the Foreign Intelligence Surveillance Act of 1978.
- Announced in: the 113th United States Congress
- Sponsored by: Patrick Leahy
- Number of co-sponsors: 10

Legislative history
- Introduced in the Senate as S. 1215 by Patrick Leahy on June 24, 2013; Committee consideration by Judiciary

The FISA Accountability and Privacy Protection Act of 2013 is a bill sponsored by Sen. Patrick Leahy in the wake of the global surveillance disclosures of 2013. The bill proposes to limit government surveillance and other reforms of US surveillance. The bill has been compared to the USA Freedom Act in the House, also supported by Sen. Leahy.
