= List of acts of the 113th United States Congress =

The acts of the 113th United States Congress includes all Acts of Congress and ratified treaties by the 113th United States Congress, which lasted from January 3, 2013 to January 3, 2015.

Acts include public and private laws, which are enacted after being passed by Congress and signed by the President. If, however, the President vetoes a bill, it can still be enacted by a two-thirds vote in both houses. The Senate alone considers treaties, which must be ratified by a two-thirds vote.

== Summary of actions ==
In this Congress, all of the statutes were promulgated (signed) by President Barack Obama. None were enacted by Congress over the President's veto.

== Public laws ==
| Public law number (Linked to Wikisource) | Date of enactment | Official short title(s) | Official description | Link to GPO |
|---|---|---|---|---|
| 113-1 | January 6, 2013 | (No short title) | Hurricane Sandy relief bill: To temporarily increase the borrowing authority of the Federal Emergency Management Agency for carrying out the National Flood Insurance Program | Pub. L. 113–1 (text) (PDF) |
| 113-2 | January 29, 2013 | Division A: Disaster Relief Appropriations Act, 2013; Division B: Sandy Recovery Improvement Act of 2013 | Making supplemental appropriations for the fiscal year ending September 30, 2013, to improve and streamline disaster assistance for Hurricane Sandy, and for other purposes | Pub. L. 113–2 (text) (PDF) |
| 113-3 | February 4, 2013 | No Budget, No Pay Act of 2013 | To ensure the complete and timely payment of the obligations of the United States Government until May 19, 2013, and for other purposes | Pub. L. 113–3 (text) (PDF) |
| 113-4 | March 7, 2013 | Violence Against Women Reauthorization Act of 2013 Sexual Assault Forensic Evidence Reporting Act of 2013 | To reauthorize the Violence Against Women Act of 1994 | Pub. L. 113–4 (text) (PDF) |
| 113-5 | March 13, 2013 | Pandemic and All-Hazards Preparedness Reauthorization Act of 2013 | To reauthorize certain programs under the ObamaCare and the Federal Food, Drug, and Cosmetic Act with respect to public health security and all-hazards preparedness and response, and for other purposes | Pub. L. 113–5 (text) (PDF) |
| 113-6 | March 26, 2013 | Consolidated and Further Continuing Appropriations Act, 2013 Agriculture, Rural Development, Food and Drug Administration, and Related Agencies Appropriations Act, 2013 Department of Commerce Appropriations Act, 2013 Department of Justice Appropriations Act, 2013 Science Appropriations Act, 2013 Commerce, Justice, Science, and Related Agencies Appropriations Act, 2013 Department of Defense Appropriations Act, 2013 Department of Homeland Security Appropriations Act, 2013 Military Construction and Veterans Affairs, and Related Agencies Appropriations Act, 2013 Full-Year Continuing Appropriations Act, 2013 | Making consolidated appropriations and further continuing appropriations for the fiscal year ending September 30, 2013, and for other purposes | Pub. L. 113–6 (text) (PDF) |
| 113-7 | April 15, 2013 | (No short title) | To modify the requirements under the STOCK Act regarding online access to certain financial disclosure statements and related forms | Pub. L. 113–7 (text) (PDF) |
| 113-8 | May 1, 2013 | District of Columbia Chief Financial Officer Vacancy Act | To amend the District of Columbia Home Rule Act to provide that the District of Columbia Treasurer or one of the Deputy Chief Financial Officers of the Office of the Chief Financial Officer of the District of Columbia may perform the functions and duties of the Office in an acting capacity if there is a vacancy in the Office | Pub. L. 113–8 (text) (PDF) |
| 113-9 | May 1, 2013 | Reducing Flight Delays Act of 2013 | To provide the Secretary of Transportation with the flexibility to transfer certain funds to prevent reduced operations and staffing of the Federal Aviation Administration, and for other purposes | Pub. L. 113–9 (text) (PDF) |
| 113-10 | May 17, 2013 | (No short title) | To specify the size of the precious-metal blanks that will be used in the production of the National Baseball Hall of Fame commemorative coins | Pub. L. 113–10 (text) (PDF) |
| 113-11 | May 24, 2013 | (No short title) | To award posthumously a Congressional Gold Medal to Addie Mae Collins, Denise McNair, Carole Robertson, and Cynthia Wesley to commemorate their death in the 16th Street Baptist Church bombing during the Civil Rights Movement | Pub. L. 113–11 (text) (PDF) |
| 113-12 | June 3, 2013 | Stolen Valor Act of 2013 | To amend Title 18 of the United States Code, with respect to fraudulent representations about having received military decorations or medals | Pub. L. 113–12 (text) (PDF) |
| 113-13 | June 3, 2013 | Freedom to Fish Act | To prohibit the Corps of Engineers from taking certain actions to establish a restricted area prohibiting public access to waters downstream of a dam, and for other purposes | Pub. L. 113–13 (text) (PDF) |
| 113-14 | June 13, 2013 | Animal Drug and Animal Generic Drug User Fee Reauthorization Act of 2013 Animal Drug User Fee Amendments of 2013 Animal Generic Drug User Fee Amendments of 2013 | Authorizes collection and spending of fees by the Food and Drug Administration (FDA) for certain activities to expedite the development and marketing approval of drugs for use in animals | Pub. L. 113–14 (text) (PDF) |
| 113-15 | June 25, 2013 | (No short title) | To amend the Internal Revenue Code of 1986 to include vaccines against seasonal influenza within the definition of taxable vaccines | Pub. L. 113–15 (text) (PDF) |
| 113-16 | July 12, 2013 | (No short title) | To grant the Congressional Gold Medal, collectively, to the First Special Service Force, in recognition of its superior service during World War II | Pub. L. 113–16 (text) (PDF) |
| 113-17 | July 12, 2013 | (No short title) | To direct the Secretary of State to develop a strategy to obtain observer status for Taiwan at the triennial International Civil Aviation Organization Assembly, and for other purposes | Pub. L. 113–17 (text) (PDF) |
| 113-18 | July 12, 2013 | (No short title) | To designate the new Interstate Route 70 bridge over the Mississippi River connecting St. Louis, Missouri, and southwestern Illinois as the "Stan Musial Veterans Memorial Bridge" | Pub. L. 113–18 (text) (PDF) |
| 113-19 | July 18, 2013 | South Utah Valley Electric Conveyance Act | Requires the Secretary of the Interior, insofar as the Strawberry Water Users Association conveyed its interest in an electric distribution system to the South Utah Valley Electric Service District, to convey and assign to the District: (1) all interest of the United States in all fixtures owned by the United States as part of the electric distribution system and the federal lands and interests where the fixtures are located, (2) license for use in perpetuity of the shared power poles, and (3) licenses for use and access in perpetuity to specified project lands and interests and corridors where federal lands and interests are abutting public streets and roads and can provide access to facilities | Pub. L. 113–19 (text) (PDF) |
| 113-20 | July 18, 2013 | Bonneville Unit Clean Hydropower Facilitation Act | Declares that, in order to facilitate hydropower development on the Diamond Fork System (Utah), a certain amount of reimbursable costs allocated to project power in the Power Appendix of the October 2004 Supplement to the 1988 Bonneville Unit Definite Plan Report shall be considered final costs, as well as specified costs in excess of the total maximum repayment obligation, subject to the same terms and conditions | Pub. L. 113–20 (text) (PDF) |
| 113-21 | July 18, 2013 | Vietnam Veterans Donor Acknowledgment Act of 2013 | Extends, to November 17, 2018, the legislative authority of the Vietnam Veterans Memorial Fund, Inc. (Fund) to establish a Vietnam Veterans Memorial visitors center. Directs the Secretary of the Interior to allow the Fund to acknowledge donor contributions to the Vietnam Veterans Memorial Visitor Center by displaying, inside the Center, an appropriate statement or credit | Pub. L. 113–21 (text) (PDF) |
| 113-22 | July 25, 2013 | (No short title) | To rename section 219(c) of the Internal Revenue Code of 1986 as the Kay Bailey Hutchison Spousal IRA | Pub. L. 113–22 (text) (PDF) |
| 113-23 | August 9, 2013 | Hydropower Regulatory Efficiency Act of 2013 | Amends the Public Utility Regulatory Policies Act of 1978 (PURPA) to increase from 5,000 to 10,000 kilowatts the size of small hydroelectric power projects which the Federal Energy Regulatory Commission (FERC) may exempt from its license requirements | Pub. L. 113–23 (text) (PDF) |
| 113-24 | August 9, 2013 | Bureau of Reclamation Small Conduit Hydropower Development and Rural Jobs Act | Amends the Reclamation Project Act of 1939 to authorize the Secretary of the Interior (acting through the Bureau of Reclamation) to contract for the development of small conduit hydropower at Bureau facilities | Pub. L. 113–24 (text) (PDF) |
| 113-25 | August 9, 2013 | (No short title) | To designate the air route traffic control center located in Nashua, New Hampshire, as the "Patricia Clark Boston Air Route Traffic Control Center" | Pub. L. 113–25 (text) (PDF) |
| 113-26 | August 9, 2013 | FOR VETS Act of 2013 | To authorize the transfer of federal surplus property to a state agency for distribution through donation within the state for purposes of education or public health for organizations whose membership comprises substantially veterans and whose representatives are recognized by the Secretary of Veterans Affairs (VA) in the preparation, presentation, and prosecution of claims under laws administered by the Secretary | Pub. L. 113–26 (text) (PDF) |
| 113-27 | August 9, 2013 | Helping Heroes Fly Act | To direct the Assistant Secretary of Homeland Security (Transportation Security Administration [TSA]) to develop and implement a process to ease travel and to the extent possible provide expedited passenger screening services for severely injured or disabled Armed Forces members and veterans, and their accompanying family members or nonmedical attendants | Pub. L. 113–27 (text) (PDF) |
| 113-28 | August 9, 2013 | Bipartisan Student Loan Certainty Act of 2013 | To amend title IV (Student Assistance) of the Higher Education Act of 1965 (HEA) to set the annual interest rate on Direct Stafford loans and Direct Unsubsidized Stafford loans issued to undergraduate students at the rate on high-yield 10-year Treasury notes plus 2.05%, but caps that rate at 8.25% | Pub. L. 113–28 (text) (PDF) |
| 113-29 | August 9, 2013 | Reverse Mortgage Stabilization Act of 2013 | To amend the National Housing Act, with respect to mortgage insurance for home equity conversion mortgages (reverse mortgages) of elderly homeowners, to authorize the Secretary of Housing and Urban Development (HUD) to establish, by notice or mortgagee letter, any additional or alternative requirements determined necessary to improve the fiscal safety and soundness of the reverse mortgage program | Pub. L. 113–29 (text) (PDF) |
| 113-30 | August 9, 2013 | (No short title) | To amend title 49, United States Code, to modify requirements relating to the availability of pipeline safety regulatory documents (H.R. 2576; 113th Congress)|To amend title 49, United States Code, to modify requirements relating to the availability of pipeline safety regulatory documents | Pub. L. 113–30 (text) (PDF) |
| 113-31 | August 9, 2013 | (No short title) | To designate the headquarters building of the Coast Guard on the campus located at 2701 Martin Luther King, Jr., Avenue Southeast in the District of Columbia as the "Douglas A. Munro Coast Guard Headquarters Building," and for other purposes | Pub. L. 113–31 (text) (PDF) |
| 113-32 | September 18, 2013 | Powell Shooting Range Land Conveyance Act | To require the United States Secretary of the Interior to convey certain Federal land to the Powell Recreation District in the State of Wyoming | Pub. L. 113–32 (text) (PDF) |
| 113-33 | September 18, 2013 | Denali National Park Improvement Act | To provide for certain improvements to the Denali National Park and Preserve in the State of Alaska, and for other purposes | Pub. L. 113–33 (text) (PDF) |
| 113-34 | September 18, 2013 | (No short title) | To amend Public Law 93–435 with respect to the Northern Mariana Islands, providing parity with Guam, the Virgin Islands, and American Samoa | Pub. L. 113–34 (text) (PDF) |
| 113-35 | September 18, 2013 | Natchez Trace Parkway Land Conveyance Act of 2013 | To direct the Secretary of the Interior to convey to the State of Mississippi 2 parcels of surplus land within the boundary of the Natchez Trace Parkway, and for other purposes | Pub. L. 113–35 (text) (PDF) |
| 113-36 | September 18, 2013 | Minuteman Missile National Historic Site Boundary Modification Act | To modify the boundary of the Minuteman Missile National Historic Site in the State of South Dakota, and for other purposes | Pub. L. 113–36 (text) (PDF) |
| 113-37 | September 30, 2013 | Improving Job Opportunities for Veterans Act of 2013 | To amend title 38, United States Code, to extend certain expiring authorities affecting veterans and their families, and for other purposes | Pub. L. 113–37 (text) (PDF) |
| 113-38 | September 30, 2013 | Missing Children's Assistance Reauthorization Act of 2013 | To amend the Missing Children's Assistance Act, and for other purposes | Pub. L. 113–38 (text) (PDF) |
| 113-39 | September 30, 2013 | Pay Our Military Act | Making continuing appropriations for military pay in the event of a government shutdown | Pub. L. 113–39 (text) (PDF) |
| 113-40 | October 2, 2013 | Helium Stewardship Act of 2013 | To amend the Helium Act to complete the privatization of the Federal helium reserve in a competitive market fashion that ensures stability in the helium markets while protecting the interests of American taxpayers, and for other purposes | Pub. L. 113–40 (text) (PDF) |
| 113-41 | October 2, 2013 | Organization of American States Revitalization and Reform Act of 2013 | To support revitalization and reform of the Organization of American States, and for other purposes | Pub. L. 113–41 (text) (PDF) |
| 113-42 | October 4, 2013 | (No short title) | To extend the period during which Iraqis who were employed by the United States Government in Iraq may be granted special immigrant status and to temporarily increase the fee or surcharge for processing machine-readable nonimmigrant visas | Pub. L. 113–42 (text) (PDF) |
| 113-43 | October 4, 2013 | Congressional Award Program Reauthorization Act of 2013 | To reauthorize the Congressional Award Act | Pub. L. 113–43 (text) (PDF) |
| 113-44 | October 10, 2013 | Department of Defense Survivor Benefits Continuing Appropriations Resolution, 2014 | Making continuing appropriations for death gratuities and related survivor benefits for survivors of deceased military service members of the Department of Defense for fiscal year 2014, and for other purposes | Pub. L. 113–44 (text) (PDF) |
| 113-45 | October 15, 2013 | (No short title) | To ensure that any new or revised requirement providing for the screening, testing, or treatment of individuals operating commercial motor vehicles for sleep disorders is adopted pursuant to a rulemaking proceeding | Pub. L. 113–45 (text) (PDF) |
| 113-46 | October 17, 2013 | Continuing Appropriations Act, 2014 | Making continuing appropriations for the fiscal year ending September 30, 2014, and for other purposes | Pub. L. 113–46 (text) (PDF) |
| 113-47 | October 31, 2013 | United States Parole Commission Extension Act of 2013 | To provide for the continued performance of the functions of the United States Parole Commission, and for other purposes | Pub. L. 113–47 (text) (PDF) |
| 113-48 | November 13, 2013 | School Access to Emergency Epinephrine Act | To amend the Public Health Service Act to increase the preference given, in awarding certain asthma-related grants, to certain States (those allowing trained school personnel to administer epinephrine and meeting other related requirements) | Pub. L. 113–48 (text) (PDF) |
| 113-49 | November 13, 2013 | (No short title) | To name the Department of Veterans Affairs medical center in Bay Pines, Florida, as the "C.W. Bill Young Department of Veterans Affairs Medical Center" | Pub. L. 113–49 (text) (PDF) |
| 113-50 | November 21, 2013 | Streamlining Claims Processing for Federal Contractor Employees Act | To amend title 40, United States Code, to transfer certain functions from the Government Accountability Office to the Department of Labor relating to the processing of claims for the payment of workers who were not paid appropriate wages under certain provisions of such title | Pub. L. 113–50 (text) (PDF) |
| 113-51 | November 21, 2013 | HIV Organ Policy Equity Act | To amend the Public Health Service Act to establish safeguards and standards of quality for research and transplantation of organs infected with human immunodeficiency virus (HIV) | Pub. L. 113–51 (text) (PDF) |
| 113-52 | November 21, 2013 | Veterans' Compensation Cost-of-Living Adjustment Act of 2013 | To provide for an increase, effective December 1, 2013, in the rates of compensation for veterans with service-connected disabilities and the rates of dependency and indemnity compensation for the survivors of certain disabled veterans, and for other purposes | Pub. L. 113–52 (text) (PDF) |
| 113-53 | November 27, 2013 | Small Airplane Revitalization Act of 2013 | To ensure that the Federal Aviation Administration advances the safety of small airplanes, and the continued development of the general aviation industry, and for other purposes | Pub. L. 113–53 (text) (PDF) |
| 113-54 | November 27, 2013 | Drug Quality and Security Act Compounding Quality Act Drug Supply Chain Security Act | To amend the Federal Food, Drug, and Cosmetic Act with respect to human drug compounding and drug supply chain security, and for other purposes | Pub. L. 113–54 (text) (PDF) |
| 113-55 | November 27, 2013 | PREEMIE Reauthorization Act or the Prematurity Research Expansion and Education for Mothers who deliver Infants Early Reauthorization (PREEMIE Reauthorization) Act National Pediatric Research Network Act of 2013 CHIMP Act Amendments of 2013 | To reduce preterm labor and delivery and the risk of pregnancy-related deaths and complications due to pregnancy, and to reduce infant mortality caused by prematurity, and for other purposes | Pub. L. 113–55 (text) (PDF) |
| 113-56 | December 2, 2013 | PEPFAR Stewardship and Oversight Act of 2013 | To extend authorities related to global HIV/AIDS and to promote oversight of United States programs | Pub. L. 113–56 (text) (PDF) |
| 113-57 | December 9, 2013 | (No short title) | To extend the Undetectable Firearms Act of 1988 for 10 years | Pub. L. 113–57 (text) (PDF) |
| 113-58 | December 20, 2013 | (No short title) | To designate the United States courthouse located at 101 East Pecan Street in Sherman, Texas, as the "Paul Brown United States Courthouse" | Pub. L. 113–58 (text) (PDF) |
| 113-59 | December 20, 2013 | Veterans Paralympic Act of 2013, renamed the VA Expiring Authorities Extension Act of 2013 | To amend title 38, United States Code, to extend certain expiring provisions of law, and for other purposes | Pub. L. 113–59 (text) (PDF) |
| 113-60 | December 20, 2013 | (No short title) | To designate the United States courthouse and Federal building located at 118 South Mill Street, in Fergus Falls, Minnesota, as the "Edward J. Devitt United States Courthouse and Federal Building" | Pub. L. 113–60 (text) (PDF) |
| 113-61 | December 20, 2013 | (No short title) | To amend title 28, United States Code, to modify the composition of the southern judicial district]] of Mississippi to improve judicial efficiency, and for other purposes | Pub. L. 113–61 (text) (PDF) |
| 113-62 | December 20, 2013 | (No short title) | To extend the authority of the Supreme Court Police to protect court officials away from the Supreme Court grounds | Pub. L. 113–62 (text) (PDF) |
| 113-63 | December 20, 2013 | Fallen Firefighters Assistance Tax Clarification Act of 2013 | To treat payments by charitable organizations with respect to certain firefighters as exempt payments | Pub. L. 113–63 (text) (PDF) |
| 113-64 | December 20, 2013 | Community Fire Safety Act of 2013 | To amend the Safe Drinking Water Act to exempt fire hydrants from the prohibition on the use of lead pipes, fittings, fixtures, solder, and flux | Pub. L. 113–64 (text) (PDF) |
| 113-65 | December 20, 2013 | Alicia Dawn Koehl Respect for National Cemeteries Act | To authorize the Secretary of Veterans Affairs and the Secretary of the Army to reconsider decisions to inter or honor the memory of a person in a national cemetery, and for other purposes | Pub. L. 113–65 (text) (PDF) |
| 113-66 | December 26, 2013 | National Defense Authorization Act for Fiscal Year 2014 Military Construction Authorization Act for Fiscal Year 2014 Military Land Withdrawals Act of 2013 | To authorize appropriations for fiscal year 2014 for military activities of the Department of Defense, for military construction, and for defense activities of the Department of Energy, to prescribe military personnel strengths for such fiscal year, and for other purposes | Pub. L. 113–66 (text) (PDF) |
| 113-67 | December 26, 2013 | Bipartisan Budget Act of 2013 Pathway for SGR Reform Act of 2013 | Making continuing appropriations for fiscal year 2014, and for other purposes | Pub. L. 113–67 (text) (PDF) |
| 113-68 | December 26, 2013 | Alaska Native Tribal Health Consortium Land Transfer Act | To provide for the conveyance of certain property located in Anchorage, Alaska, from the United States to the Alaska Native Tribal Health Consortium | Pub. L. 113–68 (text) (PDF) |
| 113-69 | December 26, 2013 | (No short title) | To amend the Energy Policy Act of 2005 to modify the Pilot Project offices]] of the Federal Permit Streamlining Pilot Project | Pub. L. 113–69 (text) (PDF) |
| 113-70 | December 26, 2013 | Native American Veterans' Memorial Amendments Act of 2013 | To clarify certain provisions of the Native American Veterans' Memorial Establishment Act of 1994 | Pub. L. 113–70 (text) (PDF) |
| 113-71 | December 26, 2013 | (No short title) | To amend the District of Columbia Home Rule Act to clarify the rules]] regarding the determination of the compensation of the Chief Financial Officer of the District of Columbia | Pub. L. 113–71 (text) (PDF) |
| 113-72 | December 26, 2013 | (No short title) | To amend the Federal Election Campaign Act to extend through 2018 the authority of the Federal Election Commission to impose civil money penalties on the basis of a schedule of penalties]] established and published by the Commission, to expand such authority to certain other violations, and for other purposes | Pub. L. 113–72 (text) (PDF) |
| 113-73 | January 15, 2014 | (No short title) | Making further continuing appropriations for fiscal year 2014, and for other purposes | Pub. L. 113–73 (text) (PDF) |
| 113-74 | January 16, 2014 | Accuracy for Adoptees Act | To require Certificates of Citizenship and other Federal documents to reflect name and date of birth determinations made by a State court and for other purposes | Pub. L. 113–74 (text) (PDF) |
| 113-75 | January 16, 2014 | (No short title) | To redesignate the Dryden Flight Research Center as the Neil A. Armstrong Flight Research Center and the Western Aeronautical Test Range as the Hugh L. Dryden Aeronautical Test Range | Pub. L. 113–75 (text) (PDF) |
| 113-76 | January 17, 2014 | Consolidated Appropriations Act, 2014 | Making consolidated appropriations for the fiscal year ending September 30, 2014, and for other purposes | Pub. L. 113–76 (text) (PDF) |
| 113-77 | January 24, 2014 | Poison Center Network Act | To amend the Public Health Service Act to reauthorize the poison center national toll-free number, national media campaign, and grant program, and for other purposes | Pub. L. 113–77 (text) (PDF) |
| 113-78 | January 24, 2014 | (No short title) | To authorize the Peace Corps Commemorative Foundation to establish a commemorative work in the District of Columbia and its environs, and for other purposes | Pub. L. 113–78 (text) (PDF) |
| 113-79 | February 7, 2014 | Agriculture Act of 2014 | To provide for the reform and continuation of agricultural and other programs of the United States Department of Agriculture through fiscal year 2018, and for other purposes | Pub. L. 113–79 (text) (PDF) |
| 113-80 | February 12, 2014 | OPM IG Act | To amend title 5, United States Code, to provide that the Inspector General of the Office of Personnel Management may use amounts in the revolving fund of the Office to fund audits, investigations, and oversight activities, and for other purposes | Pub. L. 113–80 (text) (PDF) |
| 113-81 | February 12, 2014 | Support for United States-Republic of Korea Civil Nuclear Cooperation Act | To authorize the President to extend the term of the nuclear energy agreement with the Republic of Korea until March 19, 2016 | Pub. L. 113–81 (text) (PDF) |
| 113-82 | February 15, 2014 | South Utah Valley Electric Conveyance Act | To ensure that the reduced annual cost-of-living adjustment to the retired pay of members and former members of the Armed Forces under the age of 62 required by the Bipartisan Budget Act of 2013 will not apply to members or former members who first became members prior to January 1, 2014, and for other purposes | Pub. L. 113–82 (text) (PDF) |
| 113-83 | February 15, 2014 | Temporary Debt Limit Extension Act | To temporarily extend the public debt limit, and for other purposes | Pub. L. 113–83 (text) (PDF) |
| 113-84 | February 21, 2014 | (No short title) | A joint resolution providing for the appointment of John Fahey as a citizen regent of the Board of Regents of the Smithsonian Institution | Pub. L. 113–84 (text) (PDF) |
| 113-85 | February 21, 2014 | (No short title) | A joint resolution providing for the appointment of Risa Lavizzo-Mourey as a citizen regent of the Board of Regents of the Smithsonian Institution | Pub. L. 113–85 (text) (PDF) |
| 113-86 | March 6, 2014 | National Integrated Drought Information System Reauthorization Act of 2013 | To reauthorize the National Integrated Drought Information System | Pub. L. 113–86 (text) (PDF) |
| 113-87 | March 13, 2014 | Sleeping Bear Dunes National Lakeshore Conservation and Recreation Act | To designate as wilderness certain land and inland water within the Sleeping Bear Dunes National Lakeshore in the State of Michigan, and for other purposes | Pub. L. 113–87 (text) (PDF) |
| 113-88 | March 21, 2014 | Fond du Lac Band of Lake Superior Chippewa Non-Intercourse Act of 2013 | To allow the Fond du Lac Band of Lake Superior Chippewa in the State of Minnesota to lease or transfer certain land | Pub. L. 113–88 (text) (PDF) |
| 113-89 | March 21, 2014 | Homeowner Flood Insurance Affordability Act of 2013 | To delay the implementation of certain provisions of the Biggert–Waters Flood Insurance Reform Act of 2012, and for other purposes | Pub. L. 113–89 (text) (PDF) |
| 113-90 | March 21, 2014 | Home Heating Emergency Assistance Through Transportation Act of 2014 | To address shortages and interruptions in the availability of propane and other home heating fuels in the United States, and for other purposes | Pub. L. 113–90 (text) (PDF) |
| 113-91 | March 21, 2014 | (No short title) | A joint resolution providing for the reappointment of John W. McCarter as a citizen regent of the Board of Regents of the Smithsonian Institution | Pub. L. 113–91 (text) (PDF) |
| 113-92 | March 25, 2014 | Philippines Charitable Giving Assistance Act | To accelerate the income tax benefits for charitable cash contributions for the relief of victims of the Typhoon Haiyan in the Philippines | Pub. L. 113–92 (text) (PDF) |
| 113-93 | April 1, 2014 | Protecting Access to Medicare Act of 2014 | To amend the Social Security Act to extend Medicare payments to physicians and other provisions of the Medicare and Medicaid programs, and for other purposes | Pub. L. 113–93 (text) (PDF) |
| 113-94 | April 3, 2014 | Gabriella Miller Kids First Research Act | To eliminate taxpayer financing of presidential campaigns and party conventions and reprogram savings to provide for a 10-year pediatric research initiative through the Common Fund administered by the National Institutes of Health, and for other purposes | Pub. L. 113–94 (text) (PDF) |
| 113-95 | April 3, 2014 | Support for the Sovereignty, Integrity, Democracy, and Economic Stability of Ukraine Act of 2014 | To provide for the costs of loan guarantees for Ukraine | Pub. L. 113–95 (text) (PDF) |
| 113-96 | April 3, 2014 | United States International Programming to Ukraine and Neighboring Regions | [data missing] | Pub. L. 113–96 (text) (PDF) |
| 113-97 | April 7, 2014 | Cooperative and Small Employer Charity Pension Flexibility Act | To amend the Employee Retirement Income Security Act of 1974 and the Internal Revenue Code of 1986 to provide for cooperative and small employer charity pension plans | Pub. L. 113–97 (text) (PDF) |
| 113-98 | April 7, 2014 | Children's Hospital GME Support Reauthorization Act of 2013 | To amend the Public Health Service Act to reauthorize support for graduate medical education programs in children's hospitals | Pub. L. 113–98 (text) (PDF) |
| 113-99 | April 16, 2014 | Green Mountain Lookout Heritage Protection Act | To preserve the Green Mountain Lookout in the Glacier Peak Wilderness of the Mount Baker-Snoqualmie National Forest | Pub. L. 113–99 (text) (PDF) |
| 113-100 | April 16, 2014 | (No short title) | To deny admission to the United States to any representative to the United Nations who has engaged in espionage activities against the United States, poses a threat to United States national security interests, or has engaged in a terrorist activity against the United States | Pub. L. 113–100 (text) (PDF) |
| 113-101 | May 9, 2014 | Digital Accountability and Transparency Act of 2014 | To expand the Federal Funding Accountability and Transparency Act of 2006 to increase accountability and transparency in Federal spending, and for other purposes. Also known as the "DATA Act" | Pub. L. 113–101 (text) (PDF) |
| 113-102 | May 16, 2014 | (No short title) | To amend the National Law Enforcement Museum Act to extend the termination date | Pub. L. 113–102 (text) (PDF) |
| 113-103 | May 16, 2014 | (No short title) | To amend the Act entitled An Act to regulate the height of buildings in the District of Columbia to clarify the rules of the District of Columbia regarding human occupancy of penthouses above the top story of the building upon which the penthouse is placed | Pub. L. 113–103 (text) (PDF) |
| 113-104 | May 20, 2014 | Kilah Davenport Child Protection Act of 2013 | To require the Attorney General to report on State law penalties for certain child abusers, and for other purposes | Pub. L. 113–104 (text) (PDF) |
| 113-105 | May 23, 2014 | American Fighter Aces Congressional Gold Medal Act | To award a Congressional Gold Medal to the American Fighter Aces, collectively, in recognition of their heroic military service and defense of our country's freedom throughout the history of aviation warfare | Pub. L. 113–105 (text) (PDF) |
| 113-106 | May 23, 2014 | (No short title) | To award a Congressional Gold Medal to the World War II members of the "Doolittle Tokyo Raiders", for outstanding heroism, valor, skill, and service to the United States in conducting the bombings of Tokyo | Pub. L. 113–106 (text) (PDF) |
| 113-107 | May 24, 2014 | (No short title) | To authorize the conveyance of two small parcels of land within the boundaries of the Coconino National Forest containing private improvements that were developed based upon the reliance of the landowners in an erroneous survey conducted in May 1960 | Pub. L. 113–107 (text) (PDF) |
| 113-108 | May 30, 2014 | (No short title) | To award a Congressional Gold Medal to the World War II members of the Civil Air Patrol | Pub. L. 113–108 (text) (PDF) |
| 113-109 | June 9, 2014 | (No short title) | To amend the Clean Air Act to remove the requirement for dealer certification of new light-duty motor vehicles | Pub. L. 113–109 (text) (PDF) |
| 113-110 | June 9, 2014 | (No short title) | To designate the facility of the United States Postal Service located at 103 Center Street West in Eatonville, Washington, as the "National Park Ranger Margaret Anderson Post Office" | Pub. L. 113–110 (text) (PDF) |
| 113-111 | June 9, 2014 | (No short title) | To designate the facility of the United States Postal Service located at 123 South 9th Street in De Pere, Wisconsin, as the "Corporal Justin D. Ross Post Office Building" | Pub. L. 113–111 (text) (PDF) |
| 113-112 | June 9, 2014 | (No short title) | To designate the facility of the United States Postal Service located at 14 Main Street in Brockport, New York, as the "Staff Sergeant Nicholas J. Reid Post Office Building" | Pub. L. 113–112 (text) (PDF) |
| 113-113 | June 9, 2014 | (No short title) | To designate the facility of the United States Postal Service located at 5323 Highway N in Cottleville, Missouri, as the "Lance Corporal Phillip Vinnedge Post Office" | Pub. L. 113–113 (text) (PDF) |
| 113-114 | June 9, 2014 | (No short title) | To award the Congressional Gold Medal to Shimon Peres | Pub. L. 113–114 (text) (PDF) |
| 113-115 | June 9, 2014 | (No short title) | To designate the facility of the United States Postal Service located at 232 Southwest Johnson Avenue in Burleson, Texas, as the "Sergeant William Moody Post Office Building" | Pub. L. 113–115 (text) (PDF) |
| 113-116 | June 9, 2014 | Monuments Men Recognition Act of 2014 | To grant the Congressional Gold Medal, collectively, to the Monuments Men, in recognition of their heroic role in the preservation, protection, and restitution of monuments, works of art, and artifacts of cultural importance during and following World War II | Pub. L. 113–116 (text) (PDF) |
| 113-117 | June 9, 2014 | North Texas Invasive Species Barrier Act of 2014 | To exempt from Lacey Act Amendments of 1981 certain water transfers by the North Texas Municipal Water District and the Greater Texoma Utility Authority, and for other purposes | Pub. L. 113–117 (text) (PDF) |
| 113-118 | June 9, 2014 | Gold Medal Technical Corrections Act of 2014 | To make technical corrections to two bills enabling the presentation of congressional gold medals, and for other purposes | Pub. L. 113–118 (text) (PDF) |
| 113-119 | June 9, 2014 | Sandia Pueblo Settlement Technical Amendment Act | To make a technical amendment to the T'uf Shur Bien Preservation Trust Area Act, and for other purposes | Pub. L. 113–119 (text) (PDF) |
| 113-120 | June 10, 2014 | (No short title) | To award a Congressional Gold Medal to the 65th Infantry Regiment, known as the Borinqueneers | Pub. L. 113–120 (text) (PDF) |
| 113-121 | June 10, 2014 | Water Resources Reform and Development Act of 2013 | To provide for improvements to the rivers and harbors of the United States, to provide for the conservation and development of water and related resources, and for other purposes | Pub. L. 113–121 (text) (PDF) |
| 113-122 | June 30, 2014 | Collinsville Renewable Energy Promotion Act | To reinstate and transfer certain hydroelectric licenses and extend the deadline for commencement of construction of certain hydroelectric projects | Pub. L. 113–122 (text) (PDF) |
| 113-123 | June 30, 2014 | World War II Memorial Prayer Act of 2013 | To direct the Secretary of the Interior to install in the area of the World War II Memorial in the District of Columbia a suitable plaque or an inscription with the words that President Franklin D. Roosevelt prayed with the United States on D-Day, June 6, 1944 | Pub. L. 113–123 (text) (PDF) |
| 113-124 | June 30, 2014 | Harmful Algal Bloom and Hypoxia Research and Control Amendments Act of 2014 | To amend the Harmful Algal Blooms and Hypoxia Research and Control Act of 1998, and for other purposes | Pub. L. 113–124 (text) (PDF) |
| 113-125 | June 30, 2014 | Reliable Home Heating Act | To address current emergency shortages of propane and other home heating fuels and to provide greater flexibility and information for Governors to address such emergencies in the future | Pub. L. 113–125 (text) (PDF) |
| 113-126 | July 7, 2014 | Intelligence Authorization Act for Fiscal Year 2014 | An original bill to authorize appropriations for fiscal year 2014 for intelligence and intelligence-related activities of the United States Government and the Office of the Director of National Intelligence, the Central Intelligence Agency Retirement and Disability System, and for other purposes | Pub. L. 113–126 (text) (PDF) |
| 113-127 | July 16, 2014 | (No short title) | To authorize the Secretary of the Interior to take certain Federal lands located in El Dorado County, California, into trust for the benefit of the Shingle Springs Band of Miwok Indians]] | Pub. L. 113–127 (text) (PDF) |
| 113-128 | July 23, 2014 | Workforce Innovation and Opportunity Act | To reform and strengthen the workforce investment system of the Nation to put Americans back to work and make the United States more competitive in the 21st century | Pub. L. 113–128 (text) (PDF) |
| 113-129 | July 25, 2014 | (No short title) | To amend certain definitions contained in the Provo River Project Transfer Act for purposes of clarifying certain property descriptions, and for other purposes | Pub. L. 113–129 (text) (PDF) |
| 113-130 | July 25, 2014 | (No short title) | To designate the Department of Veterans Affairs and Department of Defense joint outpatient clinic to be constructed in Marina, California, as the "Major General William H. Gourley VA-DOD Outpatient Clinic" | Pub. L. 113–130 (text) (PDF) |
| 113-131 | July 25, 2014 | Black Hills Cemetery Act | To provide for the conveyance of certain cemeteries that are located on National Forest System land in Black Hills National Forest, South Dakota | Pub. L. 113–131 (text) (PDF) |
| 113-132 | July 25, 2014 | Distinguished Flying Cross National Memorial Act | To designate a Distinguished Flying Cross National Memorial at the March Field Air Museum in Riverside, California | Pub. L. 113–132 (text) (PDF) |
| 113-133 | July 25, 2014 | Hill Creek Cultural Preservation and Energy Development Act | To clarify authority granted under the Act entitled "An Act to define the exterior boundary of the Uintah and Ouray Indian Reservation in the State of Utah, and for other purposes" | Pub. L. 113–133 (text) (PDF) |
| 113-134 | July 25, 2014 | Pascua Yaqui Tribe Trust Land Act | To provide for the conveyance of certain land inholdings owned by the United States to the Pascua Yaqui Tribe of Arizona, and for other purposes | Pub. L. 113–134 (text) (PDF) |
| 113-135 | July 25, 2014 | Three Kids Mine Remediation and Reclamation Act | To provide for the conveyance of certain Federal land in Clark County, Nevada, for the environmental remediation and reclamation of the Three Kids Mine Project Site, and for other purposes | Pub. L. 113–135 (text) (PDF) |
| 113-136 | July 25, 2014 | Idaho Wilderness Water Resources Protection Act | To authorize the continued use of certain water diversions located on National Forest System land in the Frank Church-River of No Return Wilderness and the Selway-Bitterroot Wilderness in the State of Idaho, and for other purposes | Pub. L. 113–136 (text) (PDF) |
| 113-137 | July 25, 2014 | North Cascades National Park Service Complex Fish Stocking Act | To direct the Secretary of the Interior to continue stocking fish in certain lakes in the North Cascades National Park, Ross Lake National Recreation Area, and Lake Chelan National Recreation Area | Pub. L. 113–137 (text) (PDF) |
| 113-138 | July 25, 2014 | (No short title) | To designate the Department of Veterans Affairs Vet Center in Prescott, Arizona, as the "Dr. Cameron McKinley Department of Veterans Affairs Veterans Center" | Pub. L. 113–138 (text) (PDF) |
| 113-139 | July 25, 2014 | (No short title) | To designate the facility of the United States Postal Service located at 369 Martin Luther King Jr. Drive in Jersey City, New Jersey, as the "Judge Shirley A. Tolentino Post Office Building" | Pub. L. 113–139 (text) (PDF) |
| 113-140 | July 25, 2014 | (No short title) | To redesignate the facility of the United States Postal Service located at 162 Northeast Avenue in Tallmadge, Ohio, as the "Lance Corporal Daniel Nathan Deyarmin, Jr., Post Office Building" | Pub. L. 113–140 (text) (PDF) |
| 113-141 | July 25, 2014 | Lake Hill Administrative Site Affordable Housing Act | To provide for the conveyance of the Forest Service Lake Hill Administrative Site in Summit County, Colorado | Pub. L. 113–141 (text) (PDF) |
| 113-142 | July 25, 2014 | Huna Tlingit Traditional Gull Egg Use Act | To allow for the harvest of gull eggs by the Huna Tlingit people within Glacier Bay National Park in the State of Alaska | Pub. L. 113–142 (text) (PDF) |
| 113-143 | August 1, 2014 | Veterinary Medicine Mobility Act of 2014 | To amend the Controlled Substances Act to allow a veterinarian to transport and dispense controlled substances in the usual course of veterinary practice outside of the registered location | Pub. L. 113–143 (text) (PDF) |
| 113-144 | August 1, 2014 | Unlocking Consumer Choice and Wireless Competition Act | To promote consumer choice and wireless competition by permitting consumers to unlock mobile wireless devices, and for other purposes | Pub. L. 113–144 (text) (PDF) |
| 113-145 | August 4, 2014 | Emergency Supplemental Appropriations Resolution, 2014 | A joint resolution making an emergency supplemental appropriation for the fiscal year ending September 30, 2014, to provide funding to Israel for the Iron Dome defense system to counter short-range rocket threats | Pub. L. 113–145 (text) (PDF) |
| 113-146 | August 7, 2014 | Veterans' Access to Care through Choice, Accountability, and Transparency Act of 2014 | To improve the access of veterans to medical services from the Department of Veterans Affairs, and for other purposes | Pub. L. 113–146 (text) (PDF) |
| 113-147 | August 8, 2014 | (No short title) | To designate the facility of the United States Postal Service located at 815 County Road 23 in Tyrone, New York, as the "Specialist Christopher Scott Post Office Building" | Pub. L. 113–147 (text) (PDF) |
| 113-148 | August 8, 2014 | (No short title) | To designate the facility of the United States Postal Service located at 6937 Village Parkway in Dublin, California, as the "James 'Jim' Kohnen Post Office" | Pub. L. 113–148 (text) (PDF) |
| 113-149 | August 8, 2014 | (No short title) | To designate the facility of the United States Postal Service located at 450 Lexington Avenue in New York, New York, as the "Vincent R. Sombrotto Post Office" | Pub. L. 113–149 (text) (PDF) |
| 113-150 | August 8, 2014 | Sean and David Goldman International Child Abduction Prevention and Return Act of 2014 | To ensure compliance with the 1980 Hague Convention on the Civil Aspects of International Child Abduction by countries with which the United States enjoys reciprocal obligations, to establish procedures for the prompt return of children abducted to other countries, and for other purposes | Pub. L. 113–150 (text) (PDF) |
| 113-151 | August 8, 2014 | (No short title) | To designate the facility of the United States Postal Service located at 13127 Broadway Street in Alden, New York, as the "Sergeant Brett E. Gornewicz Memorial Post Office" | Pub. L. 113–151 (text) (PDF) |
| 113-152 | August 8, 2014 | Improving Trauma Care Act of 2014 | To amend title XII of the Public Health Service Act to expand the definition of trauma to include thermal, electrical, chemical, radioactive, and other extrinsic agents | Pub. L. 113–152 (text) (PDF) |
| 113-153 | August 8, 2014 | (No short title) | To designate the facility of the United States Postal Service located at 198 Baker Street in Corning, New York, as the "Specialist Ryan P. Jayne Post Office Building" | Pub. L. 113–153 (text) (PDF) |
| 113-154 | August 8, 2014 | (No short title) | To amend the International Religious Freedom Act of 1998 to include the desecration of cemeteries among the many forms of violations of the right to religious freedom | Pub. L. 113–154 (text) (PDF) |
| 113-155 | August 8, 2014 | (No short title) | To designate the facility of the United States Forest Service for the Grandfather Ranger District located at 109 Lawing Drive in Nebo, North Carolina, as the "Jason Crisp Forest Service Building" | Pub. L. 113–155 (text) (PDF) |
| 113-156 | August 8, 2014 | Money Remittances Improvement Act of 2014 | To allow the Secretary of the Treasury to rely on State examinations for certain financial institutions, and for other purposes | Pub. L. 113–156 (text) (PDF) |
| 113-157 | August 8, 2014 | Autism CARES Act of 2014 | To reauthorize certain provisions of the Public Health Service Act relating to autism, and for other purposes | Pub. L. 113–157 (text) (PDF) |
| 113-158 | August 8, 2014 | (No short title) | To redesignate the railroad station located at 2955 Market Street in Philadelphia, Pennsylvania, commonly known as "30th Street Station", as the "William H. Gray III 30th Street Station" | Pub. L. 113–158 (text) (PDF) |
| 113-159 | August 8, 2014 | Highway and Transportation Funding Act of 2014 | To provide an extension of Federal-aid highway, highway safety, motor carrier safety, transit, and other programs funded out of the Highway Trust Fund, and for other purposes | Pub. L. 113–159 (text) (PDF) |
| 113-160 | August 8, 2014 | Emergency Afghan Allies Extension Act of 2014 | To provide additional visas for the Afghan Special Immigrant Visa Program, and for other purposes | Pub. L. 113–160 (text) (PDF) |
| 113-161 | August 8, 2014 | Near East and South Central Asia Religious Freedom Act of 2014 | To provide for the establishment of the Special Envoy to Promote Religious Freedom of Religious Minorities in the Near East and South Central Asia | Pub. L. 113–161 (text) (PDF) |
| 113-162 | August 8, 2014 | Assessing Progress in Haiti Act of 2014 | To measure the progress of recovery and development efforts in Haiti following the earthquake of January 12, 2010, and for other purposes | Pub. L. 113–162 (text) (PDF) |
| 113-163 | August 8, 2014 | Victims of Child Abuse Act Reauthorization Act of 2013 | To reauthorize subtitle A of the Victims of Child Abuse Act of 1990 | Pub. L. 113–163 (text) (PDF) |
| 113-164 | September 19, 2014 | Continuing Appropriations Resolution, 2015 | Making continuing appropriations for fiscal year 2015, and for other purposes | Pub. L. 113–164 (text) (PDF) |
| 113-165 | September 19, 2014 | Multinational Species Conservation Funds Semipostal Stamp Reauthorization Act of 2013 | To reauthorize the Multinational Species Conservation Funds Semipostal Stamp | Pub. L. 113–165 (text) (PDF) |
| 113-166 | September 26, 2014 | Paul D. Wellstone Muscular Dystrophy Community Assistance, Research and Education Amendments of 2013 | To amend the Public Health Service Act relating to Federal research on muscular dystrophy, and for other purposes | Pub. L. 113–166 (text) (PDF) |
| 113-167 | September 26, 2014 | (No short title) | To amend the Interstate Land Sales Full Disclosure Act to clarify how the Act applies to condominiums | Pub. L. 113–167 (text) (PDF) |
| 113-168 | September 26, 2014 | Tribal General Welfare Exclusion Act of 2014 | To amend the Internal Revenue Code of 1986 to clarify the treatment of general welfare benefits provided by Indian tribes | Pub. L. 113–168 (text) (PDF) |
| 113-169 | September 26, 2014 | Pyramid Lake Paiute Tribe – Fish Springs Ranch Settlement Act | To ratify a water settlement agreement affecting the Pyramid Lake Paiute Tribe, and for other purposes | Pub. L. 113–169 (text) (PDF) |
| 113-170 | September 26, 2014 | All Circuit Review Extension Act | To amend title 5, United States Code, to extend the period of certain authority with respect to judicial review of Merit Systems Protection Board decisions relating to whistle-blowers, and for other purposes | Pub. L. 113–170 (text) (PDF) |
| 113-171 | September 26, 2014 | (No short title) | To make technical corrections to Public Law 110-229 to reflect the renaming of the Bainbridge Island Japanese American Exclusion Memorial, and for other purposes | Pub. L. 113–171 (text) (PDF) |
| 113-172 | September 26, 2014 | (No short title) | To reauthorize the Defense Production Act, to improve the Defense Production Act Committee, and for other purposes | Pub. L. 113–172 (text) (PDF) |
| 113-173 | September 26, 2014 | Examination and Supervisory Privilege Parity Act of 2014 | To amend the Consumer Financial Protection Act of 2010 to specify that privilege and confidentiality are maintained when information is shared by certain nondepository covered persons with Federal and State financial regulators, and for other purposes | Pub. L. 113–173 (text) (PDF) |
| 113-174 | September 26, 2014 | (No short title) | To extend the National Advisory Committee on Institutional Quality and Integrity and the Advisory Committee on Student Financial Assistance for one year | Pub. L. 113–174 (text) (PDF) |
| 113-175 | September 26, 2014 | Department of Veterans Affairs Expiring Authorities Act of 2014 | To amend title 38, United States Code, to extend certain expiring provisions of law administered by the Secretary of Veterans Affairs, and for other purposes | Pub. L. 113–175 (text) (PDF) |
| 113-176 | September 26, 2014 | (No short title) | Approving the location of a memorial to commemorate the more than 5,000 slaves and free Black persons who fought for independence in the American Revolution | Pub. L. 113–176 (text) (PDF) |
| 113-177 | September 26, 2014 | (No short title) | To reinstate and extend the deadline for commencement of construction of a hydroelectric project involving the American Falls Reservoir | Pub. L. 113–177 (text) (PDF) |
| 113-178 | September 26, 2014 | (No short title) | To amend the Chesapeake and Ohio Canal Development Act to extend to the Chesapeake and Ohio Canal National Historical Park Commission | Pub. L. 113–178 (text) (PDF) |
| 113-179 | September 26, 2014 | Gun Lake Trust Land Reaffirmation Act | To reaffirm that certain land has been taken into trust for the benefit of the Match-E-Be-Nash-She-Wish Band of Pottawatami Indians, and for other purposes | Pub. L. 113–179 (text) (PDF) |
| 113-180 | September 26, 2014 | Emergency Medical Services for Children Reauthorization Act of 2014 | To amend the Public Health Service Act to reauthorize the Emergency Medical Services for Children Program | Pub. L. 113–180 (text) (PDF) |
| 113-181 | September 26, 2014 | Veterans' Compensation Cost-of-Living Adjustment Act of 2014 | To provide for an increase, effective December 1, 2014, in the rates of compensation for veterans with service-connected disabilities and the rates of dependency and indemnity compensation for the survivors of certain disabled veterans, and for other purposes | Pub. L. 113–181 (text) (PDF) |
| 113-182 | September 29, 2014 | Debbie Smith Reauthorization Act of 2014 | To reauthorize programs authorized under the Debbie Smith Act of 2004, and for other purposes | Pub. L. 113–182 (text) (PDF) |
| 113-183 | September 29, 2014 | Preventing Sex Trafficking and Strengthening Families Act | To prevent and address sex trafficking of children in foster care, to extend and improve adoption incentives, and to improve international child support recovery | Pub. L. 113–183 (text) (PDF) |
| 113-184 | September 29, 2014 | (No short title) | A joint resolution providing for the appointment of Michael Lynton as a citizen regent of the Board of Regents of the Smithsonian Institution | Pub. L. 113–184 (text) (PDF) |
| 113-185 | October 6, 2014 | IMPACT Act of 2014 | To amend title XVIII of the Social Security Act to provide for standardized post-acute care assessment data for quality, payment, and discharge planning, and for other purposes | Pub. L. 113–185 (text) (PDF) |
| 113-186 | November 19, 2014 | Child Care and Development Block Grant Act of 2014 | To reauthorize and improve the Child Care and Development Block Grant Act of 1990, and for other purposes | Pub. L. 113–186 (text) (PDF) |
| 113-187 | November 26, 2014 | Presidential and Federal Records Act Amendments of 2014 | To amend chapter 22 of title 44, United States Code, popularly known as the Presidential Records Act, to establish procedures for the consideration of claims of constitutionally based privilege against disclosure of Presidential records, and for other purposes | Pub. L. 113–187 (text) (PDF) |
| 113-188 | November 26, 2014 | Government Reports Elimination Act of 2014 | To provide for the elimination or modification of Federal reporting requirements | Pub. L. 113–188 (text) (PDF) |
| 113-189 | November 26, 2014 | (No short title) | To designate the facility of the United States Postal Service located at 35 Park Street in Danville, Vermont, as the "Thaddeus Stevens Post Office" | Pub. L. 113–189 (text) (PDF) |
| 113-190 | November 26, 2014 | Albuquerque, New Mexico, Federal Land Conveyance Act of 2013 | To authorize the Administrator of General Services to convey a parcel of real property in Albuquerque, New Mexico, to the Amy Biehl High School Foundation | Pub. L. 113–190 (text) (PDF) |
| 113-191 | November 26, 2014 | (No short title) | To designate the facility of the United States Postal Service located at 130 Caldwell Drive in Hazlehurst, Mississippi, as the "First Lieutenant Alvin Chester Cockrell, Jr. Post Office Building" | Pub. L. 113–191 (text) (PDF) |
| 113-192 | November 26, 2014 | (No short title) | To designate the facility of the United States Postal Service located at 278 Main Street in Chadron, Nebraska, as the "Sergeant Cory Mracek Memorial Post Office" | Pub. L. 113–192 (text) (PDF) |
| 113-193 | November 26, 2014 | (No short title) | To designate the facility of the United States Postal Service located at 1335 Jefferson Road in Rochester, New York, as the "Specialist Theodore Matthew Glende Post Office" | Pub. L. 113–193 (text) (PDF) |
| 113-194 | November 26, 2014 | Clifford P. Hansen Federal Courthouse Conveyance Act | To direct the Administrator of General Services to convey the Clifford P. Hansen Federal Courthouse to Teton County, Wyoming | Pub. L. 113–194 (text) (PDF) |
| 113-195 | November 26, 2014 | Sunscreen Innovation Act | To amend the Federal Food, Drug, and Cosmetic Act to provide an alternative process for review of safety and effectiveness of nonprescription sunscreen active ingredients and for other purposes | Pub. L. 113–195 (text) (PDF) |
| 113-196 | November 26, 2014 | Traumatic Brain Injury Reauthorization Act of 2014 | To amend the Public Health Service Act to reauthorize certain programs relating to traumatic brain injury and to trauma research | Pub. L. 113–196 (text) (PDF) |
| 113-197 | November 26, 2014 | Enhance Labeling, Accessing, and Branding of Electronic Licenses Act of 2014 | To promote the non-exclusive use of electronic labeling for devices licensed by the Federal Communications Commission | Pub. L. 113–197 (text) (PDF) |
| 113-198 | December 4, 2014 | (No short title) | To provide for the extension of the enforcement instruction on supervision requirements for outpatient therapeutic services in critical access and small rural hospitals through 2014 | Pub. L. 113–198 (text) (PDF) |
| 113-199 | December 4, 2014 | (No short title) | To amend the Federal charter of the Veterans of Foreign Wars of the United States to reflect the service of women in the Armed Forces of the United States | Pub. L. 113–199 (text) (PDF) |
| 113-200 | December 4, 2014 | STELA Reauthorization Act of 2014 | To amend the Communications Act of 1934 and title 17, United States Code, to extend expiring provisions relating to the retransmission of signals of television broadcast stations, and for other purposes | Pub. L. 113–200 (text) (PDF) |
| 113-201 | December 4, 2014 | (No short title) | Appointing the day for the convening of the first session of the One Hundred Fourteenth Congress | Pub. L. 113–201 (text) (PDF) |
| 113-202 | December 12, 2014 | (No short title) | Making further continuing appropriations for fiscal year 2015, and for other purposes | Pub. L. 113–202 (text) (PDF) |
| 113-203 | December 13, 2014 | (No short title) | Making further continuing appropriations for fiscal year 2015, and for other purposes | Pub. L. 113–203 (text) (PDF) |
| 113-204 | December 16, 2014 | (No short title) | To designate the facility of the United States Postal Service located at 14 Red River Avenue North in Cold Spring, Minnesota, as the "Officer Tommy Decker Memorial Post Office" | Pub. L. 113–204 (text) (PDF) |
| 113-205 | December 16, 2014 | (No short title) | To designate the facility of the United States Postal Service located at 4110 Almeda Road in Houston, Texas, as the "George Thomas `Mickey' Leland Post Office Building" | Pub. L. 113–205 (text) (PDF) |
| 113-206 | December 16, 2014 | (No short title) | To designate the facility of the United States Postal Service located at 500 North Brevard Avenue in Cocoa Beach, Florida, as the "Richard K. Salick Post Office" | Pub. L. 113–206 (text) (PDF) |
| 113-207 | December 16, 2014 | (No short title) | Designate the facility of the United States Postal Service located at 25 South Oak Street in London, Ohio, as the "London Fallen Veterans Memorial Post Office" | Pub. L. 113–207 (text) (PDF) |
| 113-208 | December 16, 2014 | (No short title) | To designate the facility of the United States Postal Service located at 302 East Green Street in Champaign, Illinois, as the "James R. Burgess Jr. Post Office Building" | Pub. L. 113–208 (text) (PDF) |
| 113-209 | December 16, 2014 | (No short title) | To designate the facility of the United States Postal Service located at 787 State Route 17M in Monroe, New York, as the "National Clandestine Service of the Central Intelligence Agency NCS Officer Gregg David WenzelMemorial Post Office" | Pub. L. 113–209 (text) (PDF) |
| 113-210 | December 16, 2014 | (No short title) | To provide for the award of a gold medal on behalf of Congress to Jack Nicklaus, in recognition of his service to the Nation in promoting excellence, good sportsmanship, and philanthropy | Pub. L. 113–210 (text) (PDF) |
| 113-211 | December 16, 2014 | (No short title) | To designate the facility of the United States Postal Service located at 220 Elm Avenue in Munising, Michigan, as the "Elizabeth L. Kinnunen Post Office Building" | Pub. L. 113–211 (text) (PDF) |
| 113-212 | December 16, 2014 | World War I American Veterans Centennial Commemorative Coin Act | To require the Secretary of the Treasury to mint coins in commemoration of the centennial of World War I | Pub. L. 113–212 (text) (PDF) |
| 113-213 | December 16, 2014 | (No short title) | To designate the facility of the United States Postal Service located at 10360 Southwest 186th Street in Miami, Florida, as the "Larcenia J. Bullard Post Office Building" | Pub. L. 113–213 (text) (PDF) |
| 113-214 | December 16, 2014 | (No short title) | To designate the facility of the United States Postal Service located at 3349 West 111th Street in Chicago, Illinois, as the "Captain Herbert Johnson Memorial Post Office Building" | Pub. L. 113–214 (text) (PDF) |
| 113-215 | December 16, 2014 | (No short title) | To designate the community-based outpatient clinic of the Department of Veterans Affairs to be constructed at 3141 Centennial Boulevard, Colorado Springs, Colorado, as the "PFC Floyd K. Lindstrom Department of Veterans Affairs Clinic" | Pub. L. 113–215 (text) (PDF) |
| 113-216 | December 16, 2014 | (No short title) | To designate the facility of the United States Postal Service located at 113 West Michigan Avenue in Jackson, Michigan, as the "Officer James Bonneau Memorial Post Office" | Pub. L. 113–216 (text) (PDF) |
| 113-217 | December 16, 2014 | (No short title) | To designate the community based outpatient clinic of the Department of Veterans Affairs located at 1961 Premier Drivein Mankato, Minnesota, as the "Lyle C. Pearson Community Based Outpatient Clinic" | Pub. L. 113–217 (text) (PDF) |
| 113-218 | December 16, 2014 | (No short title) | To designate the facility of the United States Postal Service located at 218-10 Merrick Boulevard in Springfield Gardens, New York, as the "Cynthia Jenkins Post Office Building" | Pub. L. 113–218 (text) (PDF) |
| 113-219 | December 16, 2014 | (No short title) | To designate the facility of the United States Postal Service located at 4000 Leap Road in Hilliard, Ohio, as the "Master Sergeant Shawn T. Hannon, Master Sergeant Jeffrey J. Rieck and Veterans Memorial Post Office Building" | Pub. L. 113–219 (text) (PDF) |
| 113-220 | December 16, 2014 | (No short title) | To designate the facility of the United States Postal Service located at 90 Vermilyea Avenue, in New York, New York, as the "Corporal Juan Mariel Alcantara Post Office Building" | Pub. L. 113–220 (text) (PDF) |
| 113-221 | December 16, 2014 | Honor Flight Act | To amend title 49, United States Code, to require the Administrator of the Transportation Security Administration to establish a process for providing expedited and dignified passenger screening services for veterans traveling to visit war memorials built and dedicated to honor their service, and for other purposes | Pub. L. 113–221 (text) (PDF) |
| 113-222 | December 16, 2014 | (No short title) | To designate the facility of the United States Postal Service located at 715 Shawan Falls Drive in Dublin, Ohio, as the "Lance Corporal Wesley G. Davids and Captain Nicholas J. Rozanski Memorial Post Office" | Pub. L. 113–222 (text) (PDF) |
| 113-223 | December 16, 2014 | Bill Williams River Water Rights Settlement Act of 2014 | To direct the Secretary of the Interior to enter into the Big Sandy River-Planet Ranch Water Rights Settlement Agreement and the Hualapai Tribe Bill Williams River Water Rights Settlement Agreement, to provide for the lease of certain land located within Planet Ranch on the Bill Williams River in the State of Arizona to benefit the Lower Colorado River Multi-Species Conservation Program, and to provide for the settlement of specific water rights claims in the Bill Williams River watershed in the State of Arizona | Pub. L. 113–223 (text) (PDF) |
| 113-224 | December 16, 2014 | (No short title) | To designate the facility of the United States Postal Service located at 2551 Galena Avenue in Simi Valley, California, as the "Neil Havens Post Office" | Pub. L. 113–224 (text) (PDF) |
| 113-225 | December 16, 2014 | (No short title) | To designate the facility of the United States Postal Service located at 13500 SW 250 Street in Princeton, Florida, as the "Corporal Christian A. Guzman Rivera Post Office Building" | Pub. L. 113–225 (text) (PDF) |
| 113-226 | December 16, 2014 | (No short title) | To designate the facility of the United States Postal Service located at 100 Admiral Callaghan Lane in Vallejo, California, as the "Philmore Graham Post Office Building" | Pub. L. 113–226 (text) (PDF) |
| 113-227 | December 16, 2014 | (No short title) | To establish the Law School Clinic Certification Program of the United States Patent and Trademark Office, and for other purposes | Pub. L. 113–227 (text) (PDF) |
| 113-228 | December 16, 2014 | (No short title) | To provide for the approval of the Amendment to the Agreement Between the Government of the United States of America and the Government of the United Kingdom of Great Britain and Northern Ireland for Cooperation on the Usesof Atomic Energy for Mutual Defense Purposes | Pub. L. 113–228 (text) (PDF) |
| 113-229 | December 16, 2014 | (No short title) | Conferring honorary citizenship of the United States on Bernardo de Galvez y Madrid, Viscount of Galveston and Count of Galvez | Pub. L. 113–229 (text) (PDF) |
| 113-230 | December 16, 2014 | (No short title) | To designate the medical center of the Department of Veterans Affairs located at 3900 Woodland Avenue in Philadelphia, Pennsylvania, as the "Corporal Michael J. Crescenz Department of Veterans Affairs Medical Center" | Pub. L. 113–230 (text) (PDF) |
| 113-231 | December 16, 2014 | (No short title) | To designate the Junction City Community-Based Outpatient Clinic located at 715 Southwind Drive, Junction City, Kansas, as the Lieutenant General Richard J. Seitz Community-Based Outpatient Clinic | Pub. L. 113–231 (text) (PDF) |
| 113-232 | December 16, 2014 | Blackfoot River Land Exchange Act of 2014 | To exchange trust and fee land to resolve land disputes created by the realignment of the Blackfoot River along the boundary of the Fort Hall Indian Reservation, and for other purposes | Pub. L. 113–232 (text) (PDF) |
| 113-233 | December 16, 2014 | Adding Ebola to the FDA Priority Review Voucher Program Act | To expand the program of priority review to encourage treatments for tropical diseases | Pub. L. 113–233 (text) (PDF) |
| 113-234 | December 16, 2014 | (No short title) | To designate the community based outpatient clinic of the Department of Veterans Affairs located at 310 Home Boulevard in Galesburg, Illinois, as the "Lane A. Evans VA Community Based Outpatient Clinic" | Pub. L. 113–234 (text) (PDF) |
| 113-235 | December 16, 2014 | Consolidated and Further Continuing Appropriations Act, 2015 | Making consolidated appropriations for the fiscal year ending September 30, 2015, and for other purposes | Pub. L. 113–235 (text) (PDF) |
| 113-236 | December 18, 2014 | Sudden Unexpected Death Data Enhancement and Awareness Act | To improve the health of children and help better understand and enhance awareness about unexpected sudden death in early life | Pub. L. 113–236 (text) (PDF) |
| 113-237 | December 18, 2014 | (No short title) | To make revisions in title 36, United States Code, as necessary to keep the title current and make technical corrections and improvements | Pub. L. 113–237 (text) (PDF) |
| 113-238 | December 18, 2014 | Aviation Security Stakeholder Participation Act of 2014 | To amend title 49, United States Code, to direct the Assistant Secretary of Homeland Security (Transportation Security Administration) to establish an Aviation Security Advisory Committee, and for other purposes | Pub. L. 113–238 (text) (PDF) |
| 113-239 | December 18, 2014 | Permanent Electronic Duck Stamp Act of 2013 | To grant the Secretary of the Interior permanent authority to authorize States to issue electronic duck stamps, and for other purposes | Pub. L. 113–239 (text) (PDF) |
| 113-240 | December 18, 2014 | Newborn Screening Saves Lives Reauthorization Act of 2014 | To amend the Public Health Service Act to reauthorize programs under part A of title XI of such Act | Pub. L. 113–240 (text) (PDF) |
| 113-241 | December 18, 2014 | (No short title) | To designate the United States Federal Judicial Center located at 333 West Broadway in San Diego, California, as the "John Rhoades Federal Judicial Center" and to designate the United States courthouse located at 333 West Broadway in San Diego, California, as the "James M. Carter and Judith N. Keep United States Courthouse" | Pub. L. 113–241 (text) (PDF) |
| 113-242 | December 18, 2014 | Death in Custody Reporting Act of 2013 | To encourage States to report to the Attorney General certain information regarding the deaths of individuals in the custody of law enforcement agencies, and for other purposes | Pub. L. 113–242 (text) (PDF) |
| 113-243 | December 18, 2014 | (No short title) | To amend certain provisions of the FAA Modernization and Reform Act of 2012 | Pub. L. 113–243 (text) (PDF) |
| 113-244 | December 18, 2014 | Crooked River Collaborative Water Security and Jobs Act of 2014 | To amend the Wild and Scenic Rivers Act to adjust the Crooked River boundary, to provide water certainty for the City of Prineville, Oregon, and for other purposes | Pub. L. 113–244 (text) (PDF) |
| 113-245 | December 18, 2014 | Transportation Security Acquisition Reform Act | To require the Transportation Security Administration to implement best practices and improve transparency with regard to technology acquisition programs, and for other purposes | Pub. L. 113–245 (text) (PDF) |
| 113-246 | December 18, 2014 | Cybersecurity Workforce Assessment Act | To require the Secretary of Homeland Security to assess the cybersecurity workforce of the Department of Homeland Security and develop a comprehensive workforce strategy, and for other purposes | Pub. L. 113–246 (text) (PDF) |
| 113-247 | December 18, 2014 | (No short title) | To designate the facility of the United States Postal Service located at 442 Miller Valley Road in Prescott, Arizona, as the "Barry M. Goldwater Post Office" | Pub. L. 113–247 (text) (PDF) |
| 113-248 | December 18, 2014 | (No short title) | To approve the transfer of Yellow Creek Port properties in Iuka, Mississippi | Pub. L. 113–248 (text) (PDF) |
| 113-249 | December 18, 2014 | (No short title) | To designate the building occupied by the Federal Bureau of Investigation located at 801 Follin Lane, Vienna, Virginia, as the "Michael D. Resnick Terrorist Screening Center" | Pub. L. 113–249 (text) (PDF) |
| 113-250 | December 18, 2014 | (No short title) | To enhance the ability of community financial institutions to foster economic growth and serve their communities, boost smallbusinesses, increase individual savings, and for other purposes | Pub. L. 113–250 (text) (PDF) |
| 113-251 | December 18, 2014 | American Savings Promotion Act | To provide for the use of savings promotion raffle products by financial institutions to encourage savings, and for other purposes | Pub. L. 113–251 (text) (PDF) |
| 113-252 | December 18, 2014 | Credit Union Share Insurance Fund Parity Act | To amend the Federal Credit Union Act to extend insurance coverage to amounts held in a member account on behalf of another person, and for other purposes | Pub. L. 113–252 (text) (PDF) |
| 113-253 | December 18, 2014 | (No short title) | To revise the boundaries of certain John H. Chafee Coastal Barrier Resources System units | Pub. L. 113–253 (text) (PDF) |
| 113-254 | December 18, 2014 | Protecting and Securing Chemical Facilities from Terrorist Attacks Act of 2014 | To recodify and reauthorize the Chemical Facility Anti-Terrorism Standards Program | Pub. L. 113–254 (text) (PDF) |
| 113-255 | December 18, 2014 | Smart Savings Act | To amend title 5, United States Code, to change the default investment fund under the Thrift Savings Plan, and for other purposes | Pub. L. 113–255 (text) (PDF) |
| 113-256 | December 18, 2014 | (No short title) | To name the Department of Veterans Affairs medical center in Waco, Texas, as the "Doris Miller Department of Veterans Affairs Medical Center" | Pub. L. 113–256 (text) (PDF) |
| 113-257 | December 18, 2014 | Veterans Traumatic Brain Injury Care Improvement Act of 2014 | To extend and modify a pilot program on assisted living services for veterans with traumatic brain injury | Pub. L. 113–257 (text) (PDF) |
| 113-258 | December 18, 2014 | (No short title) | To redesignate the facility of the United States Postal Service located at 161 Live Oak Street in Miami, Arizona, as the "Staff Sergeant Manuel V. Mendoza Post Office Building" | Pub. L. 113–258 (text) (PDF) |
| 113-259 | December 18, 2014 | (No short title) | To designate the facility of the United States Postal Service located at 601 West Baker Road in Baytown, Texas, as the "Specialist Keith Erin Grace, Jr. Memorial Post Office" | Pub. L. 113–259 (text) (PDF) |
| 113-260 | December 18, 2014 | Designer Anabolic Steroid Control Act of 2014 | To amend the Controlled Substances Act to more effectively regulate anabolic steroids | Pub. L. 113–260 (text) (PDF) |
| 113-261 | December 18, 2014 | (No short title) | To designate a segment of Interstate Route 35 in the State of Minnesota as the "James L. Oberstar Memorial Highway" | Pub. L. 113–261 (text) (PDF) |
| 113-262 | December 18, 2014 | May 31, 1918 Act Repeal Act | To repeal the Act of May 31, 1918, and for other purposes | Pub. L. 113–262 (text) (PDF) |
| 113-263 | December 18, 2014 | EPS Service Parts Act of 2014 | To amend the Energy Policy and Conservation Act to permit exemptions for external power supplies from certain efficiency standards, and for other purposes | Pub. L. 113–263 (text) (PDF) |
| 113-264 | December 18, 2014 | Federal Duck Stamp Act of 2014 | To amend the Migratory Bird Hunting and Conservation Stamp Act to increase in the price of Migratory Bird Hunting and Conservation Stamps to fund the acquisition of conservation easements for migratory birds, and for other purposes | Pub. L. 113–264 (text) (PDF) |
| 113-265 | December 18, 2014 | EARLY Act Reauthorization of 2014 | To reauthorize the Young Women's Breast Health Education and Awareness Requires Learning Young Act of 2009 | Pub. L. 113–265 (text) (PDF) |
| 113-266 | December 18, 2014 | (No short title) | To designate the facility of the United States Postal Service located at 73839 Gorgonio Drive in Twentynine Palms, California, as the "Colonel M.J. `Mac' Dube, USMC Post Office Building" | Pub. L. 113–266 (text) (PDF) |
| 113-267 | December 18, 2014 | (No short title) | To designate the facility of the United States Postal Service located at 801 West Ocean Avenue in Lompoc, California, as the "Federal Correctional Officer Scott J. Williams Memorial Post Office Building" | Pub. L. 113–267 (text) (PDF) |
| 113-268 | December 18, 2014 | (No short title) | To designate the facility of the United States Postal Service located at 101 East Market Street in Long Beach, California, as the "Juanita Millender-McDonald Post Office" | Pub. L. 113–268 (text) (PDF) |
| 113-269 | December 18, 2014 | Propane Education and Research Enhancement Act of 2014 | To modify certain provisions relating to the Propane Education and Research Council | Pub. L. 113–269 (text) (PDF) |
| 113-270 | December 18, 2014 | No Social Security for Nazis Act | To amend the Social Security Act to provide for the termination of social security benefits for individuals who participated in Nazi persecution, and for other purposes | Pub. L. 113–270 (text) (PDF) |
| 113-271 | December 18, 2014 | (No short title) | To extend the authorization for the United States Commission on International Religious Freedom | Pub. L. 113–271 (text) (PDF) |
| 113-272 | December 18, 2014 | Ukraine Freedom Support Act of 2014 | To impose sanctions with respect to the Russian Federation, to provide additional assistance to Ukraine, and for other purposes | Pub. L. 113–272 (text) (PDF) |
| 113-273 | December 18, 2014 | Chesapeake Bay Accountability and Recovery Act of 2014 | To require the Director of the Office of Management and Budget to prepare a crosscut budget for restoration activities in the Chesapeake Bay watershed, and for other purposes | Pub. L. 113–273 (text) (PDF) |
| 113-274 | December 18, 2014 | Cybersecurity Enhancement Act of 2014 | To provide for an ongoing, voluntary public-private partnership to improve cybersecurity, and to strengthen cybersecurity research and development, workforce development and education, and public awareness and preparedness, and for other purposes | Pub. L. 113–274 (text) (PDF) |
| 113-275 | December 18, 2014 | (No short title) | To amend the Violence Against Women Reauthorization Act of 2013 to repeal a special rule for the State of Alaska, and for other purposes | Pub. L. 113–275 (text) (PDF) |
| 113-276 | December 18, 2014 | Naval Vessel Transfer Act of 2013 | To provide for the transfer of naval vessels to certain foreign recipients, and for other purposes | Pub. L. 113–276 (text) (PDF) |
| 113-277 | December 18, 2014 | Border Patrol Agent Pay Reform Act of 2014 | To amend title 5, United States Code, to improve the security of the United States border and to provide for reforms and rates of pay for border patrol agents | Pub. L. 113–277 (text) (PDF) |
| 113-278 | December 18, 2014 | Venezuela Defense of Human Rights and Civil Society Act of 2014 | To impose targeted sanctions on persons responsible for violations of human rights of antigovernment protesters in Venezuela, to strengthen civil society in Venezuela, and for other purposes | Pub. L. 113–278 (text) (PDF) |
| 113-279 | December 18, 2014 | Insurance Capital Standards Clarification Act of 2014 | To clarify the application of certain leverage and risk-based requirements under the Dodd-Frank Wall Street Reform and Consumer Protection Act | Pub. L. 113–279 (text) (PDF) |
| 113-280 | December 18, 2014 | United States Anti-Doping Agency Reauthorization Act | To reauthorize the United States Anti-Doping Agency, and for other purposes | Pub. L. 113–280 (text) (PDF) |
| 113-281 | December 18, 2014 | Howard Coble Coast Guard and Maritime Transportation Act of 2014 | To authorize appropriations for the Coast Guard for fiscal year 2015, and for other purposes | Pub. L. 113–281 (text) (PDF) |
| 113-282 | December 18, 2014 | National Cybersecurity Protection Act of 2014 | To codify an existing operations center for cybersecurity | Pub. L. 113–282 (text) (PDF) |
| 113-283 | December 18, 2014 | Federal Information Security Modernization Act of 2014 | To amend chapter 35 of title 44, United States Code, to provide for reform to Federal information security | Pub. L. 113–283 (text) (PDF) |
| 113-284 | December 18, 2014 | DHS OIG Mandates Revision Act of 2014 | To repeal certain mandates of the Department of Homeland Security Office of Inspector General | Pub. L. 113–284 (text) (PDF) |
| 113-285 | December 18, 2014 | (No short title) | To release the City of St. Clair, Missouri, from all restrictions, conditions, and limitations on the use, encumbrance, conveyance, andclosure of the St. Clair Regional Airport | Pub. L. 113–285 (text) (PDF) |
| 113-286 | December 18, 2014 | Foreclosure Relief and Extension for Servicemembers Act of 2014 | To extend temporarily the extended period of protection for members of uniformed services relating to mortgages, mortgage foreclosure, and eviction, and for other purposes | Pub. L. 113–286 (text) (PDF) |
| 113-287 | December 19, 2014 | (No short title) | To enact title 54, United States Code, "National Park Service and Related Programs", as positive law | Pub. L. 113–287 (text) (PDF) |
| 113-288 | December 19, 2014 | Collectible Coin Protection Act | To amend the Hobby Protection Act to make unlawful the provision of assistance or support in violation of that Act, and for other purposes | Pub. L. 113–288 (text) (PDF) |
| 113-289 | December 19, 2014 | Senator Paul Simon Water for the World Act of 2014 | To strengthen implementation of the Senator Paul Simon Water for the Poor Act of 2005 by improving the capacity of the United States Government to implement, leverage, and monitor and evaluate programs to provide first-time or improved access to safe drinking water, sanitation, and hygiene to the world's poorest on an equitable and sustainable basis, and for other purposes | Pub. L. 113–289 (text) (PDF) |
| 113-290 | December 19, 2014 | Grand Portage Band Per Capita Adjustment Act | To amend the Act of October 19, 1973, concerning taxable income to members of the Grand Portage Band of Lake Superior Chippewa Indians | Pub. L. 113–290 (text) (PDF) |
| 113-291 | December 19, 2014 | Carl Levin and Howard P. "Buck" McKeon National Defense Authorization Act for Fiscal Year 2015 | To authorize appropriations for fiscal year 2015 for military activities of the Department of Defense, for military construction, and for defense activities of the Department of Energy, to prescribe military personnel strengths for such fiscal year, and for other purposes | Pub. L. 113–291 (text) (PDF) |
| 113-292 | December 19, 2014 | (No short title) | To designate the facility of the United States Postal Service located at 18640 NW 2nd Avenue in Miami, Florida, as the "Father Richard Marquess-Barry Post Office Building" | Pub. L. 113–292 (text) (PDF) |
| 113-293 | December 19, 2014 | Intelligence Authorization Act for Fiscal Year 2015 | To authorize appropriations for fiscal years 2014 and 2015 for intelligence and intelligence-related activities of the United States Government, the Community Management Account, and the Central Intelligence Agency Retirement and Disability System, and for other purposes | Pub. L. 113–293 (text) (PDF) |
| 113-294 | December 19, 2014 | (No short title) | To amend title 49, United States Code, to provide for limitations on the fees charged to passengers of air carriers | Pub. L. 113–294 (text) (PDF) |
| 113-295 | December 19, 2014 | (No short title) | To amend the Internal Revenue Code of 1986 to extend certain expiring provisions and make technical corrections, to amend the Internal Revenue Code of 1986 to provide for the tax treatment of ABLE accounts established under State programs for the care of family members with disabilities, and for other purposes | Pub. L. 113–295 (text) (PDF) |
| 113-296 | December 19, 2014 | United States-Israel Strategic Partnership Act of 2014 | To enhance the strategic partnership between the United States and Israel | Pub. L. 113–296 (text) (PDF) |

== Private laws ==
No private laws were enacted this Congress.

== Treaties ==
| Treaty number | Date of Ratification | Short title | Description |
|---|---|---|---|
| Treaty 112-4 | April 3, 2014 | Agreement on Port State Measures to Prevent, Deter, and Eliminate Illegal, Unreported, and Unregulated Fishing | |
| Treaty 113-1 | April 3, 2014 | Convention on the Conservation and Management of High Seas Fishery Resources in the South Pacific Ocean | |
| Treaty 113-2 | April 3, 2014 | Convention on the Conservation and Management of High Seas Fisheries Resources in the North Pacific Ocean | |
| Treaty 113-3 | April 3, 2014 | Amendment to the Convention on Future Multilateral Cooperation in the Northwest Atlantic Fisheries | |

== See also ==
- Proposed bills of the 113th United States Congress
- List of United States federal legislation
- List of acts of the 112th United States Congress
- List of acts of the 114th United States Congress
