= Ruth Moore Act of 2013 =

- Long title: To amend title 38, United States Code, to improve the disability compensation evaluation procedure of the Secretary of Veterans Affairs for veterans with mental health conditions related to military sexual trauma, and for other purposes.
- Announced in: the 113th United States Congress
- Sponsored by: Rep. Chellie Pingree (D, ME-1)
- Number of co-sponsors: 11

Codification
- U.S.C. sections affected: 38 U.S.C. § 1154, Subchapter VI of chapter 11 of title 38, United States Code38 U.S.C. § 1164(a), 38 U.S.C. § 1164(b)(1), 38 U.S.C. § 1164(b)(1), 38 U.S.C. § 1164(b)(1), 38 U.S.C. § 5104(b)(1), 38 U.S.C. § 1154(c)(3)(A), 38 U.S.C. § 1154(c)(3)(B), 38 U.S.C. § 1154(c), 38 U.S.C. § 1154(a),
- Agencies affected: United States Congress, United States Department of Veterans Affairs, Veterans Benefits Administration, Department of Health and Human Services,

[H.R. 671 Legislative history]
- Introduced in the House as H.R. 671 by Rep. Chellie Pingree (D-ME) on February 13, 2013; Committee consideration by United States House Committee on Veterans' Affairs, United States House Veterans' Affairs Subcommittee on Disability Assistance and Memorial Affairs; Passed the House on June 4, 2013 (Voice vote)

The Ruth Moore Act of 2013 (H.R. 671) is a bill that was introduced into the 113th United States Congress and passed the United States House of Representatives on June 4, 2013. The bill would change some of the rules regarding mental health medical coverage for veterans to treat claims related to military sexual trauma more leniently with respect to requiring proof of such sexual trauma.

== Background ==
The bill is named after veteran Ruth Moore, a woman who was raped twice and then spent 23 years trying to get the benefits that were due to her. Many military rapes go unreported, making it difficult for service members to get help later under the existing rules.

== Provisions/Elements of the bill ==
This summary is based largely on the summary provided by the Congressional Research Service, a public domain source.

The Ruth Moore Act of 2013 would direct the United States Secretary of Veterans Affairs (VA), in any case in which a veteran claims that a covered mental health condition was incurred in or aggravated by military sexual trauma during active duty, to accept as sufficient proof of service-connection a diagnosis by a mental health professional together with satisfactory lay or other evidence of such trauma and an opinion by the mental health professional that such condition is related to such trauma, if consistent with the circumstances, conditions, or hardships of such service, notwithstanding the fact that there is no official record of such incurrence or aggravation in such service, and to resolve every reasonable doubt in favor of the veteran. The law would, however, allow such service-connection to be rebutted by clear and convincing evidence to the contrary.

The Ruth Moore Act of 2013 would include as a "covered mental health condition" post-traumatic stress disorder, anxiety, depression, or any other mental health diagnosis that the Secretary determines to be related to military sexual trauma.

Finally, if passed, the law would require the Secretary to report annually to Congress in each of 2014 through 2018 on covered claims submitted.

== Procedural history ==
=== House ===
The Ruth Moore Act of 2013 (H.R. 671) was introduced in the House by Rep. Chellie Pingree (D-ME) on February 13, 2013. It was referred to the United States House Committee on Veterans' Affairs and the United States House Veterans' Affairs Subcommittee on Disability Assistance and Memorial Affairs. It passed the House on June 4, 2013 by a voice vote.

== See also ==
- List of bills in the 113th United States Congress
- Sexual assault in the United States military
- Military sexual trauma
