= Philippines Charitable Giving Assistance Act =

- Long title: To accelerate the income tax benefits for charitable cash contributions for the relief of victims of the Typhoon Haiyan in the Philippines.
- Announced in: the 113th United States Congress
- Sponsored by: Rep. Eric Swalwell (D, CA-15)
- Number of co-sponsors: 12

Codification
- Acts affected: Internal Revenue Code of 1986

Legislative history
- Introduced in the House as H.R. 3771 by Rep. Eric Swalwell (D, CA-15) on December 12, 2013; Committee consideration by United States House Committee on Ways and Means, United States House Committee on the Budget; Passed the House on March 24, 2014 (voice vote); Passed the Senate on March 25, 2014 (unanimous consent); Signed into law by President Barack Obama on March 25, 2014

The Philippines Charitable Giving Assistance Act (H.R. 3771; Pub. L. 113–92 (text) (PDF)) allowed Americans to retroactively claim tax deductions for charitable donations made between January 1, 2014 and April 15, 2014 as donations made in the year 2013, which were made for the relief of victims of Typhoon Haiyan in the Philippines and nearby areas, after the Federal Trade Commission and State of Hawaii Department of Commerce and Consumer Affairs published advisories concerning Typhoon Haiyan charity scams. Under the law, the Internal Revenue Service accepted phone bills in lieu of documentation from 501(c)(3) organizations for those donations made for the relief of victims of the typhoon. The typhoon did an estimated $1 billion in damage and killed thousands of people.

The bill was introduced into the U.S. House of Representatives during the 113th United States Congress by Representative Eric Swalwell of California. A similar bill was sponsored in the United States Senate by Senator Mazie Hirono of Hawaii at the same time as the House version. The bill became law on March 25, 2014 after it was signed by President Barack Obama.

== Background ==
Map of damaged houses by municipality showing track of storm, from the United Nations, as of November 18, 2013

Typhoon Haiyan, known as Typhoon Yolanda in the Philippines, was a powerful tropical cyclone that devastated portions of Southeast Asia, particularly the Philippines, on November 8, 2013. It is the deadliest Philippine typhoon on record, killing at least 6,201 people in that country alone. Haiyan is also the strongest storm recorded at landfall, and unofficially the strongest typhoon ever recorded in terms of wind speed. As of January 2014, bodies were still being found. The cyclone caused catastrophic destruction in the Visayas, particularly on Samar and Leyte. According to UN officials, about 11 million people have been affected and many have been left homeless.

The United States government gave the Philippines $52 million worth of aid and deployed the United States Marines, United States Navy and United States Air Force in order to assist with the humanitarian operations. This was seen by observers as part of the Asia pivot that the United States government had previously announced. The Philippine government had been discussing with the U.S. plans regarding the deployment of U.S. military troops within the country. Aid contributions of the U.S. was seen as a sign of goodwill in order to further strengthen relations.

== Provisions of the bill ==
This summary is based largely on the summary provided by the Congressional Research Service, a public domain source.

The Philippines Charitable Giving Assistance Act would treat cash contributions made after January 1, 2014, and before March 1, 2014, for the relief of victims in the Republic of the Philippines affected by Typhoon Haiyan as having been made on December 31, 2013, for purposes of the tax deduction for charitable contributions. The bill would deem such a contribution as meeting the recordkeeping requirements of the Internal Revenue Code if the taxpayer produces a telephone bill showing the name of the donee organization and the date and amount of the contribution.

== Procedural history ==
The Philippines Charitable Giving Assistance Act was introduced into the United States House of Representatives on December 12, 2013 by Rep. Eric Swalwell (D, CA-15). It was referred to the United States House Committee on Ways and Means and the United States House Committee on the Budget. On March 20, 2014, The Hill reported that the bill was expected to be considered the following week under a suspension of the rules. The House voted to pass the bill with a voice vote on March 24, 2014. The United States Senate voted to pass the bill by unanimous consent on March 25, 2014, and it was signed into law later that day by President Barack Obama.

== Debate and discussion ==
Rep. Swalwell argued in favor of the bill, which he introduced, saying "Typhoon Haiyan devastated many parts of the Philippines and we should make it as easy as possible for Americans who want to assist those affected by the storm." Swalwell saw the bill as providing "another incentive for Americans to donate and donate now - when their help is needed most."

== See also ==
- List of bills in the 113th United States Congress
- Income tax in the United States
- Acts of the 113th United States Congress
