= Unlocking Consumer Choice and Wireless Competition Act =

- Long title: To promote consumer choice and wireless competition by permitting consumers to unlock mobile wireless devices, and for other purposes.
- Announced in: the 113th United States Congress
- Sponsored by: Sen. Patrick J. Leahy (D, VT)
- Number of co-sponsors: 5

Citations
- Public law: Pub. L. 113–144 (text) (PDF)

Codification
- Acts amended: Copyright Act of 1976
- U.S.C. sections affected: 17 U.S.C. § 1201
- Agencies affected: Library of Congress

Legislative history
- Introduced in the Senate as S. 517 by Patrick Leahy (D–VT) on March 11, 2013; Committee consideration by United States Senate Committee on the Judiciary; Passed the Senate on July 15, 2014 (unanimous consent); Passed the House on July 25, 2014 (voice vote); Signed into law by President Barack Obama on August 1, 2014

The Unlocking Consumer Choice and Wireless Competition Act (S. 517; Pub. L. 113–144 (text) (PDF)) is a United States public law that repeals a rulemaking determination by the United States Copyright Office that left it illegal for people to unlock their cellphones.

The bill passed in both the United States Senate and the United States House of Representatives during the 113th United States Congress. It was signed into law on August 1, 2014 by President Barack Obama.

== Background ==
In the United States and other areas, where carriers often offer deeply discounted cell phones in exchange for an exclusive agreement with a carrier, that phone will often be locked so it will not work with another carrier. Under the Digital Millennium Copyright Act of 1998 (DMCA), it was illegal to use technical means to circumvent copyright protection systems. Therefore, consumers could not use software to circumvent the carrier lock on their cell phones (sometimes referred to as "hacking").

In 2010 the Electronic Frontier Foundation (EFF) successfully convinced the United States Copyright Office to grant an exemption to the anti-circumvention provisions of the DMCA. However, exemptions to the DMCA are not permanent and must be reauthorized periodically by the Copyright Office. In a rulemaking determination effective October 28, 2012, the Copyright Office declined to extend the unlocking exemption for the next three-year period.

As a result, only phones that were purchased before or within 90 days of the effective date could continue to be unlocked by users. Phones purchased more than 90 days past the effective date would again be subject to the anti-circumvention clause of the DMCA and could not be legally unlocked without the carrier's permission.

In March 2013, the Obama administration and the Federal Communications Commission expressed the opinion that consumers should be able to switch carriers and keep their existing phones in response to a successful petition on the WhiteHouse.gov platform We the People.

== Provisions of the bill ==
This summary is based largely on the summary provided by the Congressional Research Service, a public domain source.

The Unlocking Consumer Choice and Wireless Competition Act would repeal a Library of Congress (LOC) rulemaking determination, made upon the recommendation of the Register of Copyrights, regarding the circumvention of technological measures controlling access to copyrighted software on wireless telephone handsets (mobile telephones) for the purpose of connecting to different wireless telecommunications networks (a practice commonly referred to as "unlocking" such devices). Reestablishes, as an exemption to provisions of the Digital Millennium Copyright Act (DMCA) prohibiting such circumvention, a previous LOC rule permitting the use of computer programs, in the form of firmware or software, that enable used wireless telephone handsets to connect to a wireless telecommunications network, when circumvention is initiated by the owner of the copy of such computer program solely to connect to such a network and access to the network is authorized by the network operator, thus permitting unlocked phones.

The bill would direct the Librarian of Congress, upon the recommendation of the Register, to determine whether to extend such exemption to include any other category of wireless devices in addition to wireless telephone handsets (e.g., tablets and other mobile broadband-enabled devices).

== Congressional Budget Office report ==
This summary is based largely on the summary provided by the Congressional Budget Office, as reported by the Senate Committee on the Judiciary on July 10, 2014. This is a public domain source.

The Congressional Budget Office (CBO) estimates that implementing S. 517 would have no significant effect on discretionary spending over the 2015-2019 period. Enacting S. 517 would not affect direct spending or revenues; therefore, pay-as-you-go procedures do not apply.

S. 517 would repeal a rule published in October 2012 by the Librarian of Congress (LOC) that limited the ability of certain owners of wireless telephone handsets to "unlock" their phones, that is, to circumvent software protections that prevent the owner from connecting to a different wireless network. The bill would reinstate an earlier rule that provided broader authority to circumvent such protections. S. 517 also would direct the LOC to consider whether to extend that broader authority to other categories of wireless devices in addition to smartphones. Based on information from the LOC, CBO estimates that implementing the provisions of the bill would not have a significant effect on the agency's workload.

S. 517 contains no intergovernmental mandates as defined in the Unfunded Mandates Reform Act (UMRA) and would not affect the budgets of state, local, or tribal governments.

S. 517 would impose a private-sector mandate by eliminating an existing right of action for wireless carriers (and others), who are currently able to pursue legal action against those who, without permission, circumvent the access controls on certain wireless telephone handsets. The cost of the mandate would be the forgone net value of settlements and damages in such cases. A search of the literature suggests that few, if any, of those types of lawsuits have been brought against individual consumers. Because such claims would probably be uncommon in the future and the damage awards allowed in such cases would be relatively small, CBO estimates that the cost of this mandate would be small and fall below the annual threshold established in UMRA for private-sector mandate ($152 million in 2014, adjusted annually for inflation). If the Librarian of Congress decides to broaden the exemption allowed under the bill to cover other types of mobile devices, such an action would eliminate additional rights of action. The cost of that expansion would depend on what devices the Librarian would include under the exemption and the forgone net value of settlements and damages. CBO has no basis to estimate the cost of such mandates as it would depend on the regulatory actions taken by the Librarian.

On November 5, 2013, CBO transmitted a cost estimate for H.R. 1123, the Unlocking Consumer Choice and Wireless Competition Act, as ordered reported by the House Committee on the Judiciary on July 31, 2013. The provisions of both pieces of legislation are similar, as are the CBO cost estimates.

== Procedural history ==
The Unlocking Consumer Choice and Wireless Competition Act was introduced into the United States Senate on March 11, 2013 by Sen. Patrick J. Leahy (D, VT). It was referred to the United States Senate Committee on the Judiciary. On July 15, 2014, the Senate voted to pass the bill with unanimous consent. The House voted to pass the bill on July 25, 2014, sending it to president for signature or veto.

On August 1, 2014, President Obama signed the bill into law.

== Debate and discussion ==
Rep. Bob Goodlatte (R-VA) supported the bill, saying "this is something that Americans have been asking for and I am pleased that we were able to work together to ensure the swift passage of legislation restoring the exemption that allowed consumers to unlock their cell phones."

== See also ==
- List of bills in the 113th United States Congress
- SIM lock
- Acts of the 113th United States Congress
