= Veterinary Medicine Mobility Act of 2014 =

- Long title: To amend the Controlled Substances Act to allow a veterinarian to transport and dispense controlled substances in the usual course of veterinary practice outside of the registered location.
- Announced in: the 113th United States Congress
- Sponsored by: Rep. Kurt Schrader (D, OR-5)
- Number of co-sponsors: 7

Codification
- Acts affected: Controlled Substances Act
- U.S.C. sections affected: 21 U.S.C. § 822

Legislative history
- Introduced in the House as H.R. 1528 by Rep. Kurt Schrader (D, OR-5) on April 12, 2013; Committee consideration by United States House Committee on Energy and Commerce, United States House Committee on the Judiciary, United States House Energy Subcommittee on Health, United States House Judiciary Subcommittee on Crime, Terrorism, Homeland Security and Investigations; Passed the House on July 8, 2014 (voice vote); Passed the Senate on July 16, 2014 (unanimous consent); Signed into law by President Barack Obama on August 1, 2014

The Veterinary Medicine Mobility Act of 2014 (H.R. 1528; Pub. L. 113–143 (text) (PDF)) is a United States public law that amends the Controlled Substances Act to clarify that veterinarians are not required to have separate registrations to dispense controlled substances outside of their principal place of business, such as when treating animals on a farm.

The bill was introduced into the United States House of Representatives during the 113th United States Congress. It was signed into law on August 1, 2014 by President Barack Obama.

== Background ==
According to the American Veterinary Medical Association, veterinarians need to take controlled substances that are "vital medications that can provide pain management, anesthesia or euthanasia" to sites other than their offices in order to treat animals on location. Some veterinarians received letters from the Drug Enforcement Administration stating that when they traveled with these drugs, they were violating the law.

== Provisions of the bill ==
This summary is based largely on the summary provided by the Congressional Research Service, a public domain source.

The Veterinary Medicine Mobility Act of 2014 would amend the Controlled Substances Act to prohibit a veterinarian who is registered to manufacture or distribute controlled substances from being required to have a separate registration in order to transport and dispense controlled substances in the usual course of veterinary practice at a site other than such veterinarian's principal place of business or professional practice, as long as the dispensing site is located in a state where the veterinarian is licensed to practice.

== Congressional Budget Office report ==
This summary is based largely on the summary provided by the Congressional Budget Office, as ordered reported by the House Committee on Energy and Commerce on April 3, 2014. This is a public domain source.

Current law requires persons who distribute controlled substances to register with the United States Department of Justice; a separate registration is required for each principal place of business or professional practice. H.R. 1528 would clarify that veterinarians are not required to have separate registrations to dispense controlled substances outside of their principal place of business—when treating animals on a farm, for example—if the use of these substances is required in the usual course of veterinary practice in a state where the veterinarian is licensed to practice.

The Congressional Budget Office (CBO) expects that implementing H.R. 1528 would not change the number of registrations by veterinarians or significantly affect spending by the Department of Justice. Enacting the bill would not affect direct spending or revenues; therefore, pay-as-you-go procedures do not apply.

H.R. 1528 contains no intergovernmental or private-sector mandates as defined in the Unfunded Mandates Reform Act and would impose no costs on state, local, or tribal governments.

== Procedural history ==
The Veterinary Medicine Mobility Act of 2014 was introduced into the United States House of Representatives on April 12, 2013 by Rep. Kurt Schrader (D, OR-5). It was coauthored by Rep. Ted Yoho (R-FL); Schrader and Yoho are both veterinarians. The bill was referred to the United States House Committee on Energy and Commerce, the United States House Committee on the Judiciary, the United States House Energy Subcommittee on Health, and the United States House Judiciary Subcommittee on Crime, Terrorism, Homeland Security and Investigations. The bill was reported (amended) on May 20, 2014 alongside House Report 113-457 part 1. The House voted on July 8, 2014 to pass the bill in a voice vote. The Senate voted on July 16, 2014 to pass the bill with unanimous consent. President Barack Obama signed the bill into law on August 1, 2014.

== Debate and discussion ==
The American Veterinary Medical Association lobbied in favor of the bill, arguing that "the CSA must be amended so that our nation's animals do not suffer unnecessarily."

The Humane Society Veterinary Medical Association (HSVMA) supported the bill, arguing that the Drug Enforcement Agency's decision to interpret the Controlled Substances Act as prohibiting veterinarians from traveling with controlled substances was a "critical problem." According to the HSVMA, veterinarians who "perform much-needed mobile veterinary services and house-calls including at-home euthanasia, mobile spay/neuter clinics, on-site care on rural ranches and other agricultural facilities, rescue and relocation of wild animals, disaster response, triage in cruelty cases, and disease control and abatement response" need to be able to travel with the controlled substances they use in those tasks.

The Association of American Veterinary Medical Colleges (AAVMC) was also in favor of the legislation, arguing that "it is imperative veterinarians be able to legally transport controlled substances to the location of the animal patient, not only for animal health and welfare, but for public safety."

The bill was supported by "over 130 organizations, including all 50 state veterinary medical associations."

== See also ==
- List of bills in the 113th United States Congress
- Acts of the 113th United States Congress
- Veterinary medicine
