= FOR VETS Act of 2013 =

United States law

Formerly Owned Resources for Veterans to Express Thanks for Service Act of 2013
- Long title: To amend title 40, United States Code, to improve veterans service organizations access to Federal surplus personal property.
- Announced in: the 113th United States Congress
- Sponsored by: Rep. Dan Benishek (R, MI-1)
- Number of co-sponsors: 3

Codification
- U.S.C. sections affected: 40 U.S.C. § 549(c)(3), 40 U.S.C. § 549(c)(3)(A), 40 U.S.C. § 549(c)(3)(B), 40 U.S.C. § 549(c)(3)(B), 40 U.S.C. § 549(c)(3)(B), 38 U.S.C. § 101, 38 U.S.C. § 5902,
- Agencies affected: United States Department of Veterans Affairs

[H.R. 1171 Legislative history]
- Introduced in the House as H.R. 1171 by Rep. Dan Benishek (R-MI) on March 14, 2013; Committee consideration by United States House Committee on Oversight and Government Reform, United States Senate Committee on Homeland Security and Governmental Affairs; Passed the House on July 8, 2013 (Roll Call Vote 307: 387-1); Passed the Senate on August 1, 2013 (Unanimous); Signed into law by President Barack Obama on August 9, 2013

The Formerly Owned Resources for Veterans to Express Thanks for Service Act of 2013 or FOR VETS Act of 2013 (H.R. 1171) is an act of the 113th United States Congress. The bill changed federal law so that additional Veterans Service Organizations became eligible for free goods and equipment through the Federal Surplus Personal Property Donation Program run by the General Services Administration (GSA). The program takes overstock or excess items, working equipment that is being replaced, and so forth that belongs to the federal government and makes it cheaply available to various nonprofit groups. The FOR VETS Act of 2010 was intended to make this equipment available to Veterans Service Organizations for free, but a wording error limited free equipment only to VSOs working on education of public health. This bill is meant to correct the previous mistake.

== Provisions/Elements of the bill ==
This summary is based largely on the summary provided by the Congressional Research Service, a public domain source.

The Formerly Owned Resources for Veterans to Express Thanks for Service Act of 2013 or the FOR VETS Act of 2013 would authorize the transfer of federal surplus property to a state agency for distribution through donation within the state for purposes of education or public health for organizations whose membership comprises substantially veterans and whose representatives are recognized by the United States Secretary of Veterans Affairs (VA) in the preparation, presentation, and prosecution of claims under laws administered by the Secretary.

== Congressional Budget office report ==
H.R. 1171 would amend federal law regarding the disposal of federal personal property (including items such as furniture, office supplies, and construction equipment). Under current law, veterans organizations involved in education or health programs can obtain personal property through the Federal Surplus Personal Property Donation Program at no cost; other organizations must pay for such property. The legislation would expand eligibility to allow any organization that primarily supports veterans to receive donations free of charge.

Based on information from the General Services Administration (GSA) about the current donation program, the Congressional Budget Office (CBO) estimates that implementing the legislation would have no significant impact on the federal budget. Enacting H.R. 1171 would reduce offsetting receipts (a credit against direct spending); therefore, pay-as-you-go procedures apply. However, the CBO estimates that any such losses of offsetting receipts that might result from donating personal property to additional veterans organizations would not be significant in any year because GSA already offers many organizations the opportunity to receive surplus personal property. Enacting the bill would not affect revenues.

H.R. 1171 contains no intergovernmental or private-sector mandates as defined in the Unfunded Mandates Reform Act and would not affect the budgets of state, local, or tribal governments.

== Procedural history ==
=== House ===
The Formerly Owned Resources for Veterans to Express Thanks for Service Act of 2013 was introduced into the House on March 14, 2013 by Rep. Dan Benishek (R-MI). It was referred to the United States House Committee on Oversight and Government Reform, which held hearings and a markup session about the bill on May 22, 2013, before reporting it by voice vote. It was reported alongside House Report 113-126, a six-page report explaining the proposed law and the committee's decisions about it. On July 8, 2013, the House voted to pass the bill in Roll Call Vote 307: 387-1.

=== Senate ===
The Formerly Owned Resources for Veterans to Express Thanks for Service Act of 2013 was received in the United States Senate on July 9, 2013 and referred to the United States Senate Committee on Homeland Security and Governmental Affairs.

== See also ==
- List of bills in the 113th United States Congress
- General Services Administration
