= Veterans Paralympic Act of 2013 =

US act allowing funds for disabled veterans

- Long title: To amend title 38, United States Code, to extend the authorization of appropriations for the Secretary of Veterans Affairs to pay a monthly assistance allowance to disabled veterans training or competing for the Paralympic Team and the authorization of appropriations for the Secretary of Veterans Affairs to provide assistance to United States Paralympics, Inc.
- Announced in: the 113th United States Congress
- Sponsored by: Rep. Mike Coffman (R, CO-6)
- Number of co-sponsors: 1

Codification
- U.S.C. sections affected: 38 U.S.C. § 521A, 38 U.S.C. § 322

Legislative history
- Introduced in the House as H.R. 1402 by Rep. Mike Coffman (R, CO-6) on March 25, 2013; Committee consideration by United States House Committee on Veterans' Affairs, United States House Veterans' Affairs Subcommittee on Economic Opportunity

The Veterans Paralympic Act of 2013 (H.R. 1402) is a bill that would help fund United States participation in the Paralympic Games. The United States Department of Veterans Affairs would be authorized $2 million a year to help pay for disabled veterans to train for the games. And additional $8 million would be authorized as a grant to U.S. Paralympics, Inc. The bill was introduced into the United States House of Representatives during the 113th United States Congress.

== Background ==
Veteran Athlete Training Allowances is the official name for the monthly support granted to eligible veteran paralympic athletes under existing law, to be renewed by this bill. Some of the requirements of the program are that "athletes must also have established training and competition plans and are responsible for turning in monthly and quarterly reports in order to continue receiving the monthly assistance allowance." Athletes need to meet a certain level of skill in their sport in order receive funding; the level and how it is judged changes depending on the sport.

== Provisions of the bill ==
This summary is based largely on the summary provided by the Congressional Research Service, a public domain source.

The Veterans Paralympic Act of 2013 would extend, until FY2018, the yearly: (1) $2 million appropriations authorization for the Secretary of Veterans Affairs (VA) to pay a monthly assistance allowance to disabled veterans training or competing for the Paralympic Team; and (2) $8 million appropriations authorization, with amounts appropriated remaining available without fiscal year limitation, for grants to U.S. Paralympics, Inc.

== Procedural history ==
The Veterans Paralympic Act of 2013 was introduced into the United States House of Representatives on March 25, 2013 by Rep. Mike Coffman (R, CO-6). It was referred to the United States House Committee on Veterans' Affairs and the United States House Veterans' Affairs Subcommittee on Economic Opportunity. The Subcommittee held hearings about the bill on April 10, 2013, and held a Consideration and Mark-up Session on April 25, 2013. On April 25, 2013, the Subcommittee voted with a voice vote to forward the bill on to the full Committee. On December 6, 2013, Majority Leader Eric Cantor's office announced that H.R. 1402 would be considered under a suspension of the rules during the week of December 9, 2013.

== Debate and discussion ==
One veteran, writing to thank Mike Coffman, argued that the program is important in helping "disabled veterans to stay active." Coffman argues that "this program ensures that disabled veterans in local communities throughout the country continue to have opportunities for rehabilitation, stress relief and higher achievement through adaptive sports."

== See also ==
- List of bills in the 113th United States Congress
- Paralympic Games
