= Veterans' Compensation Cost-of-Living Adjustment Act of 2013 =

- Long title: To provide for an increase, effective December 1, 2013, in the rates of compensation for veterans with service-connected disabilities and the rates of dependency and indemnity compensation for the survivors of certain disabled veterans, and for other purposes.
- Announced in: the 113th United States Congress
- Sponsored by: Sen. Bernard Sanders (I, VT)
- Number of co-sponsors: 13

Codification
- Acts affected: Social Security Act
- U.S.C. sections affected: 42 U.S.C. § 415, 38 U.S.C. § 1313, 42 U.S.C. § 401 et seq., 38 U.S.C. § 1115, 38 U.S.C. ch. 11, and others.
- Agencies affected: United States Department of Veterans Affairs

Legislative history
- Introduced in the Senate as S. 893 by Sen. Bernard Sanders (I, VT) on May 8, 2013; Committee consideration by United States Senate Committee on Veterans' Affairs, United States House Committee on Veterans' Affairs; Passed the Senate on October 28, 2013 (Unanimous consent)

The Veterans' Compensation Cost-of-Living Adjustment Act of 2013 (S. 893) is a federal statute in the United States that increased the disability compensation rate for American veterans and their families. The rate increased by the same amount as the cost of living increase that was applied to Social Security. The bill passed the United States Senate and House during the 113th United States Congress, and was signed into law by President Barack Obama on November 21, 2013.

== Background ==
A similar bill (H.R. 569) was introduced in the House. There was no cost of living adjustment in 2010 or 2011.

== Provisions of the bill ==
This summary is based largely on the summary provided by the Congressional Research Service, a public domain source.

The Veterans' Compensation Cost-of-Living Adjustment Act of 2013 directed the United States Secretary of Veterans Affairs (VA) to increase, as of December 1, 2013, the rates of veterans' disability compensation, additional compensation for dependents, the clothing allowance for certain disabled veterans, and dependency and indemnity compensation for surviving spouses and children.

The bill required each such increase to be the same percentage as the increase in benefits provided under title II (Old Age, Survivors and Disability Insurance) of the Social Security Act, on the same effective date.

== Congressional Budget Office report ==
This summary is based largely on the summary provided by the Congressional Budget Office, as ordered reported by the Senate Committee on Veterans’ Affairs on July 24, 2013. This is a public domain source.

S. 893 increased the amounts paid to veterans for disability compensation and to their survivors for dependency and indemnity compensation (DIC) by the same cost-of-living adjustment (COLA) payable to Social Security recipients. The increase took effect on December 1, 2013.

The COLA that was authorized by this bill is assumed in the Congressional Budget Office's (CBO) baseline, consistent with section 257 of the Balanced Budget and Emergency Deficit Control Act. Because the COLA is assumed in the CBO's baseline, the COLA provision had no budgetary effect relative to the baseline. Relative to current law, the CBO estimated that enacting this bill would increase spending for those programs by $0.9 million in fiscal year 2014. This estimate assumed that the COLA effective on December 1, 2013, would be 1.5 percent. (The annualized cost would be about $1.2 billion in subsequent years. The CBO previously estimated that the COLA change relative to current law would be about $2.6 billion on an annualized basis in contrast to that corrected figure of about $1.2 billion.)

== Procedural history ==
The Veterans' Compensation Cost-of-Living Adjustment Act of 2013 was introduced on May 8, 2013, by Sen. Bernard Sanders (I, VT). It was referred to the United States Senate Committee on Veterans' Affairs. It was released from the Committee alongside Senate Report 113-87. On October 28, 2013, the Senate voted by Unanimous consent to pass the bill.

The Veterans' Compensation Cost-of-Living Adjustment Act of 2013 was received in the United States House of Representatives. It was referred to the United States House Committee on Veterans' Affairs. On November 8, 2013, House Majority Leader Eric Cantor announced that H.R. 2871 would be considered under a suspension of the rules on the House floor on November 12, 2013. The bill was considered along with five other bills, starting after the House opened for the day at 2pm. The bill passed the House, and on November 21, 2013, it was signed into law by President Barack Obama.

== See also ==
- List of bills in the 113th United States Congress
