= Veterans' Compensation Cost-of-Living Adjustment Act of 2014 =

- Long title: To provide for an increase, effective December 1, 2014, in the rates of compensation for veterans with service-connected disabilities and the rates of dependency and indemnity compensation for the survivors of certain disabled veterans, and for other purposes.
- Announced in: the 113th United States Congress
- Sponsored by: Sen. Mark Begich (D-AK)
- Number of co-sponsors: 14

Codification
- U.S.C. sections affected: 42 U.S.C. § 415, 38 U.S.C. § 1313, 42 U.S.C. § 401 et seq., 38 U.S.C. § 1115, 38 U.S.C. ch. 11, and others.
- Agencies affected: United States Department of Veterans Affairs

Legislative history
- Introduced in the Senate as S. 2258 by Sen. Mark Begich (D-AK) on April 28, 2014; Committee consideration by United States Senate Committee on Veterans' Affairs; Passed the Senate on September 11, 2014 (unanimous consent)

The Veterans' Compensation Cost-of-Living Adjustment Act of 2014 (S. 2258) was a bill that would have, beginning on December 1, 2014, increase the rates of veterans' disability compensation, additional compensation for dependents, the clothing allowance for certain disabled veterans, and dependency and indemnity compensation for surviving spouses and children. This is a cost of living increase.

The bill was introduced into the United States Senate during the 113th United States Congress.

== Provisions of the bill ==
This summary is based largely on the summary provided by the Congressional Research Service, a public domain source.

The Veterans' Compensation Cost-of-Living Adjustment Act of 2014 would direct the Secretary of Veterans Affairs (VA) to increase, as of December 1, 2014, the rates of veterans' disability compensation, additional compensation for dependents, the clothing allowance for certain disabled veterans, and dependency and indemnity compensation for surviving spouses and children.

The bill would require each such increase to be the same percentage as the increase in benefits provided under title II (Old Age, Survivors and Disability Insurance) of the Social Security Act, on the same effective date.

== Procedural history ==
The Veterans' Compensation Cost-of-Living Adjustment Act of 2014 was introduced into the United States Senate on April 28, 2014, by Sen. Mark Begich (D-AK). It was referred to the United States Senate Committee on Veterans' Affairs. On September 11, 2014, the Senate voted to pass the bill by unanimous consent.

== Debate and discussion ==
Senator Begich, who introduced the bill, argued that "we have an obligation to the men and women who have sacrificed so much to serve our country and who now deserve nothing less than the full support of a grateful Nation."

== See also ==
- List of bills in the 113th United States Congress
- Social Security (United States)
