= Children's Hospital GME Support Reauthorization Act of 2013 =

Children’s Hospital GME Support Reauthorization Act of 2013
- Long title: To amend the Public Health Service Act to reauthorize support for graduate medical education programs in children’s hospitals.
- Announced in: the 113th United States Congress
- Sponsored by: Sen. Robert P. Casey, Jr. (D, PA)
- Number of co-sponsors: 15

Citations
- Public law: Pub. L. 113–98 (text) (PDF)

Codification
- Acts affected: Public Health Service Act, Social Security Act
- U.S.C. sections affected: 42 U.S.C. § 256e
- Agencies affected: Department of Health and Human Services
- Authorizations of appropriations: $300,000,000 for each of fiscal years 2014, 2015, 2016, 2017, and 2018, a total of $1,500,000,000 over five years

Legislative history
- Introduced in the Senate as S. 1557 by Sen. Robert P. Casey, Jr. (D, PA) on September 27, 2013; Committee consideration by United States Senate Committee on Health, Education, Labor, and Pensions, United States House Committee on Energy and Commerce; Passed the Senate on November 12, 2013 (Unanimous consent); Passed the House on April 1, 2014 (voice vote); Signed into law by President Barack Obama on April 7, 2014

The Children's Hospital GME Support Reauthorization Act of 2013 (S. 1557; Pub. L. 113–98 (text) (PDF)) is a law that amends the Public Health Service Act to authorize payments to children's hospitals for operating training programs that provide graduate medical education. The law authorizes funding for approximately 55 eligible hospitals across 30 different states. The Children's Hospital GME Support Reauthorization Act of 2013 became law during the 113th United States Congress.

H.R. 297, a different bill with the same name and similar provisions, passed the House of Representatives in February 2013 but did not make progress in the Senate.

== Background ==
According to a report about a similar reauthorization bill in the House, "the Children’s Hospital Graduate Medical Education (CHGME) program was first enacted in 1999 as part of the Healthcare Research and Quality Act (Pub. L. 106–129 (text) (PDF)) to provide freestanding children's hospitals with discretionary Federal support for direct and indirect expenses associated with operating medical residency training programs." The same report indicates that "freestanding children’s hospitals train over 40% of pediatricians, 43% of pediatric specialists, and most pediatric researchers."

In FY 2011, two children's hospitals in Pennsylvania received $32 million under this program.

The CHGME program's appropriations are authorized through FY2018. The President's budget for FY2019 proposes to eliminate funding for this program; instead, it proposes that CHGME funds be combined with other sources of GME support, which would require new legislation.

== Provisions of the bill ==
Overall, the bill reauthorizes an older law that funds medical education programs at children's hospitals. This bill would reauthorize the program until 2018, unlike the House version which would only reauthorize it until 2017.

The bill would increase the available spots for pediatricians. It would also "extend funding to teaching programs at children’s psychiatric hospitals."

== Congressional Budget Office report ==
This summary is based largely on the summary provided by the Congressional Budget Office, as ordered reported by the Senate Committee on Health, Education, Labor, and Pensions on October 30, 2013. This is a public domain source.

S. 1557 would amend the Public Health Service Act to authorize payments to children's hospitals for operating training programs that provide graduate medical education. Payments would be made to such hospitals for both direct and indirect costs related to graduate medical education. Direct costs are those related to operating a medical education program, such as the salaries of medical students, while indirect costs are those intended to compensate hospitals for patient care costs that are expected to be higher in teaching hospitals than in non-teaching hospitals.

S. 1557 would authorize the appropriation of $300 million a year for each of fiscal years 2014 through 2018 for payments to children's hospitals. The Congressional Budget Office (CBO) estimated that implementing the bill would cost about $1.4 billion over the 2014-2018 period, assuming the appropriation of the authorized amounts. Pay-as-you-go procedures do not apply to this legislation because it would not affect direct spending or revenues.

The bill contains no intergovernmental or private-sector mandates as defined in the Unfunded Mandates Reform Act.

== Procedural history ==
The Children's Hospital GME Support Reauthorization Act of 2013 (S. 1557) was introduced on September 27, 2013, by Sen. Robert P. Casey, Jr. (D, PA). It was referred to the United States Senate Committee on Health, Education, Labor, and Pensions. That committee held a hearing about the bill on October 30, 2013. On November 12, 2013, the Senate voted by unanimous consent to pass the bill.

The bill was received in the House on November 13, 2013, and referred to the United States House Committee on Energy and Commerce. On April 1, 2014, the House passed the bill in a voice vote. On April 7, 2014, President Barack Obama signed the bill into law, making it Pub. L. 113–98 (text) (PDF).

== Debate and discussion ==
The American Hospital Association supported the bill.

The bill is considered bipartisan.

== See also ==
- List of bills in the 113th United States Congress
- Acts of the 113th United States Congress
- Residency (medicine)
