= Black Hills Cemetery Act =

Law of the United States

- Long title: To provide for the conveyance of certain cemeteries that are located on National Forest System land in Black Hills National Forest, South Dakota.
- Announced in: the 113th United States Congress
- Sponsored by: Rep. Kristi L. Noem (R, SD-0)
- Number of co-sponsors: 0

Citations
- Public law: Pub. L. 113–131 (text) (PDF)

Codification
- Agencies affected: United States Department of Agriculture, United States Forest Service

Legislative history
- Introduced in the House as H.R. 291 by Rep. Kristi Noem (SD-R) on January 15, 2013; Committee consideration by United States House Committee on Natural Resources, United States House Natural Resources Subcommittee on Public Lands and Environmental Regulation, United States Senate Committee on Energy and Natural Resources; Passed the House on May 6, 2013 (Roll Call Vote 130: 390-2); Passed the Senate on July 9, 2014 (Unanimous consent); Signed into law by President Barack Obama on July 25, 2014

The Black Hills Cemetery Act (H.R. 291; Pub. L. 113–131 (text) (PDF)) is a United States public law that was introduced into the United States House of Representatives of the 113th United States Congress on January 15, 2013 by Rep. Kristi Noem (R-SD). The bill would transfer ownership of nine cemeteries (and some surrounding land) located in South Dakota from the ownership of the U.S. government to the ownership of the local communities that have been caring for and maintaining those cemeteries. The bill was signed into law on July 25, 2014.

== Background ==
There are nine specific cemeteries listed in the bill that are currently cared for by local community groups. The bill is designed to transfer ownership of the cemetery land to those groups. The House of Representatives in the 112th United States Congress passed H.R. 3874, which was identical legislation, that failed to become law.

One of the cemeteries was started in the mid-1870s and ran out of space in 2008. The bill would expand that cemetery.

== Provisions/Elements of the bill ==
This summary is based largely on the summary provided by the Congressional Research Service, a public domain source.

The Black Hills Cemetery Act would direct the Department of Agriculture (USDA) to convey, to the local communities in South Dakota that are currently managing specified community cemeteries, all interest of the United States in the parcels of National Forest System land that contain the cemeteries. The Act would also direct the Department of Agriculture to convey up to an additional two acres adjoining each cemetery to ensure that such conveyances include unmarked gravesites and allow for the expansion of those cemeteries.

The Act would specify three requirements. First, each such conveyance would be subject to the condition that the recipient accept the conveyed real property in the condition it is in at the time of conveyance. Second, the conveyed lands must continue to be used in the same manner and for the same purposes as they were used immediately before their conveyance. Finally, the recipients of the parcels of the real property conveyed under this Act must bear the cost of the survey for their particular parcel.

== Procedural history ==
The Black Hills Cemetery Act H.R. 291 was introduced into the House by Rep. Kristi Noem (SD-R) on January 15, 2013. It was referred to the United States House Committee on Natural Resources and the United States House Natural Resources Subcommittee on Public Lands and Environmental Regulation. The bill was reported by the Committee on Natural Resources on April 9, 2013 alongside House Report 113-26. The bill was voted on by the full House on May 6, 2013 under a suspension of the rules. The bill passed by a vote of 390-2, recorded in Roll Call 130.

The Black Hill Cemetery Act was received in the Senate on May 7, 2013 and referred to the United States Senate Committee on Energy and Natural Resources. The Senate voted on July 9, 2014 to pass the bill by unanimous consent. The bill was then signed into law by President Barack Obama on July 25, 2014.

== Debate ==
Supporters argued that it would be easier to care for the cemeteries if they were owned and managed by the local community instead of the U.S. Forest Service. Supporters also argued that it was important to expand the cemeteries by two acres so that locals could be buried there. One resident said that it was because "families who have guild homes, had kids, grew up here, falling in love with the hills like we have and i hope one day in the distant future to call this my final resting place because this is home."

== See also ==
- List of bills in the 113th United States Congress
- Cemetery
- Acts of the 113th United States Congress
