= Water Resources Reform and Development Act of 2014 =

American federal law

- Long title: To provide for improvements to the rivers and harbors of the United States, to provide for the conservation and development of water and related resources, and for other purposes.
- Announced in: the 113th United States Congress
- Sponsored by: Rep. Bill Shuster (R-PA)

Citations
- Public law: Pub. L. 113–121 (text) (PDF)

Legislative history
- Introduced in the House as H.R. 3080 by Rep. Bill Shuster (R-PA) on September 11, 2013; Committee consideration by United States House Committee on Transportation and Infrastructure, United States House Transportation Subcommittee on Water Resources and Environment, United States House Committee on the Budget, United States House Committee on Ways and Means, United States House Committee on Natural Resources, United States House Natural Resources Subcommittee on Public Lands and Environmental Regulation, United States House Natural Resources Subcommittee on Water and Power, United States House Natural Resources Subcommittee on Indian and Alaska Native Affairs; Passed the House on October 23, 2013 (Roll Call Vote 560: 417-3); Passed the Senate on October 31, 2013 (unanimous consent); Reported by the joint conference committee on May 15, 2014; agreed to by the House on May 20, 2014 (412-4) and by the Senate on May 22, 2014 (Roll Call Vote 163: 91-7); Signed into law by President Barack Obama on June 10, 2014

The Water Resources Reform and Development Act of 2014 (H.R. 3080; Pub. L. 113–121 (text) (PDF)) is a water resources bill that would authorize the United States Army Corps of Engineers to do various water related projects, such as improvements to ports or flood protection. It was introduced into the United States House of Representatives during the 113th United States Congress.

== Background ==
Typically, water resource bills are passed every few years, but one has not passed since 2007. One reason no other water bill has passed since 2007 is that there have been controversies about the bill's use of earmarks to fund specific projects.

== Provisions of the bill ==
The bill contains reforms intended to speed up "project delivery by eliminating duplicative studies and requiring concurrent reviews, and streamlining environmental reviews." It also deauthorizes $12 billion worth of projects that have not been active over the last five years. The bill would also allow non-federal organizations and groups to provide funding for projects. If passed, the bill would set up a Congressional review process for approving projects, instead of letting the Army Corps of Engineers make all decisions about which project to pursue.

== Congressional Budget Office report ==
As ordered reported by the House Committee on Transportation and Infrastructure on September 19, 2013.

H.R. 3080 would authorize the United States Army Corps of Engineers (Corps) to construct water projects for mitigating storm and hurricane damage, restoring ecosystems, and improving flood management. The legislation also would authorize the agency to assist states and local governments with levee safety programs and to assist Indian tribes with planning and technical assistance for water resources projects. Finally, H.R. 3080 would direct the Corps to implement a pilot program to enter agreements with nonfederal partners to manage and construct certain projects. Those agreements would be subject to appropriation of all federal costs.

Assuming appropriation of the necessary amounts, including adjustments for anticipated inflation, the Congressional Budget Office (CBO) estimates that implementing H.R. 3080 would cost about $3.5 billion over 2014-2018 period. Spending would continue for authorized projects after 2018, and the CBO estimates that such spending would total $4.7 billion over the 2019-2023 period.

Pay-as-you-go procedures do not apply because enacting the bill would not affect direct spending or revenues.

H.R. 3080 contains no intergovernmental or private-sector mandates as defined in the Unfunded Mandates Reform Act.

== Procedural history ==
The Water Resources Reform and Development Act of 2013 was introduced into the House on September 11, 2013 by Rep. Bill Shuster (R-PA). It was referred to the following committees and subcommittees: United States House Committee on Transportation and Infrastructure, United States House Transportation Subcommittee on Water Resources and Environment, United States House Committee on the Budget, United States House Committee on Ways and Means, United States House Committee on Natural Resources, United States House Natural Resources Subcommittee on Public Lands and Environmental Regulation, United States House Natural Resources Subcommittee on Water and Power, and United States House Natural Resources Subcommittee on Indian and Alaska Native Affairs. The House Committee on Transportation and Infrastructure ordered the bill reported by voice vote on September 19, 2013. The Committee released House Report 113-246 part 1 on October 21, 2013. On October 23, 2013, the House voted in Roll Call Vote 560 to pass the bill 417-3. The United States Senate voted by unanimous consent to pass the bill with an amendment on October 31, 2013. This led to a conference about the bill, with the Conference Report 113-449 being filed on May 15, 2014. The House then voted on May 20, 2014 to pass the conference report 412-4. The Senate voted on May 22, 2014 to pass the bill 91-7 in Roll Call Vote 163. On June 10, 2014, President Barack Obama signed the bill and it became Pub. L. 113–121 (text) (PDF).

== Debate and discussion ==
Speaking in favor of the bill, Representative Shuster argued that the bill was primarily about jobs and improving the United States' competitiveness. According to Shuster, "A strong water transportation network is critical to keeping pace with other nations that are improving their own infrastructure networks and gaining ground in an increasingly competitive global marketplace."

The bill was considered to be bipartisan. Newspaper The Hill said that this bill and three others from the week of October 21, 2013, would give the House "a chance to practice the long-forgotten art of working together." This was a reference to the contentious United States federal government shutdown of 2013, which ended the previous week.

The conference report was opposed by Heritage Action, which said that the bill "hikes spending while doing little to reduce bureaucracy and limit the role of the federal government."

== See also ==
- List of bills in the 113th United States Congress
- United States Army Corps of Engineers
