= Hill Creek Cultural Preservation and Energy Development Act =

- Long title: To clarify authority granted under the Act entitled An Act to define the exterior boundary of the Uintah and Ouray Indian Reservation in the State of Utah, and for other purposes.
- Announced in: the 113th United States Congress
- Sponsored by: Rep. Rob Bishop (R, UT-1)
- Number of co-sponsors: 3

Citations
- Public law: Pub. L. 113–133 (text) (PDF)

Codification
- Acts affected: "An Act to amend the Act extending the exterior boundary of the Uintah and Ouray Indian Reservation in the State of Utah so as to authorize such State to exchange certain mineral lands mineral in character"; "An Act to define the exterior boundary of the Uintah and Ouray Indian Reservation in the State of Utah, and for other purposes"; Mineral Leasing Act
- U.S.C. sections affected: 30 U.S.C. § 171 et seq., 30 U.S.C. § 181 et seq.
- Agencies affected: United States Department of the Interior

Legislative history
- Introduced in the House as H.R. 356 by Rep. Rob Bishop (R-UT) on January 23, 2013; Committee consideration by United States House Committee on Natural Resources, United States House Natural Resources Subcommittee on Indian and Alaska Native Affairs, United States House Natural Resources Subcommittee on Energy and Mineral Resources, United States Senate Committee on Energy and Natural Resources; Passed the House on May 15, 2013 (voice vote); Passed the Senate on July 9, 2014 (unanimous consent); Signed into law by President Barack Obama on July 25, 2014

The Hill Creek Cultural Preservation and Energy Development Act (H.R. 356; Pub. L. 113–133 (text) (PDF)) is a United States public law that was introduced into the United States House of Representatives of the 113th United States Congress on January 23, 2013, by Rep. Rob Bishop (R-UT). The law outlines a swap in the ownership of mineral rights of certain pieces of land located in Utah. The United States federal government, Utah's School and Institutional Trust Land Administration (SITLA), and the Ute Indian Tribe of the Uintah and Ouray Reservation are all involved in the exchange.

== Provisions/Elements of the bill ==
This summary is based largely on information provided by the Congressional Research Service and the Congressional Budget Office, both public domain sources.

The Hill Creek Cultural Preservation and Energy Development Act would authorize the state of Utah to relinquish for the benefit of the Ute Indian Tribe of the Uintah and Ouray Reservation certain of its school trust or subsurface mineral lands south of the border between Grand County and Uintah County, Utah, in exchange for certain federal subsurface mineral lands north of that border. The bill sets out the details of a mineral rights swap between Utah's School and Institutional Trust Land Administration (SITLA), the federal government, and the Ute Indian Tribe. The Hill Creek Cultural Preservation and Energy Development Act establishes a framework under which this switch can take place. According to the Congressional Budget Office, about 18,000 acres are being considered in exchange for 18,000 different acres.

In setting up the conditions for the swap the bill directs the Department of the Interior to reserve an overriding interest in a portion of the land being exchanged, namely that portion of the mineral estate composed of minerals subject to leasing under the Mineral Leasing Act in the mineral lands conveyed to Utah. The bill also requires Utah to reserve, for the benefit of its school trust, an overriding interest in that portion of the mineral estate composed of minerals subject to leasing under the Mineral Leasing Act in the mineral lands it relinquished to the federal government.

== Procedural history ==
The Hill Creek Cultural Preservation and Energy Development Act H.R. 356 was introduced into the House by Rep. Rob Bishop (R-UT) on January 23, 2013. It was referred to the United States House Committee on Natural Resources and then to two of its subcommittees, the United States House Natural Resources Subcommittee on Indian and Alaska Native Affairs and the United States House Natural Resources Subcommittee on Energy and Mineral Resources. On April 24, 2013, it was ordered to be reported by Unanimous Consent by the House Committee on Natural Resources. The House Majority Leader Eric Cantor announced on Friday May 10, 2013 that H.R. 1580 would be considered the following week. On May 15, 2013, the House voted in a voice vote to pass the bill.

The bill was sent to the United States Senate and referred to the United States Senate Committee on Energy and Natural Resources. On July 9, 2014, the Senate voted to pass the bill with unanimous consent. On July 25, 2014, President Barack Obama signed the bill into law.

== Debate and discussion ==
Senator Orrin Hatch supported the bill, arguing that it "gives Utahns greater opportunity to manage the specified lands and structures as they see fit." Hatch argued that the bill "creates an important new opportunity for energy in our state."

The Wilderness Society supported the bill. A spokesman said that "this legislation will help protect one of the most ecologically critical and culturally sensitive lands in the country".

== See also ==
- Ute people
- Uintah and Ouray Indian Reservation
- List of bills in the 113th United States Congress
- Mineral rights
