= South Utah Valley Electric Conveyance Act =

- Long title: To direct the Secretary of the Interior to convey certain Federal features of the electric distribution system to the South Utah Valley Electric Service District, and for other purposes.
- Announced in: the 113th United States Congress
- Sponsored by: Rep. Jason Chaffetz (R, UT-3)
- Number of co-sponsors: 0

Citations
- Public law: Pub. L. 113–19 (text) (PDF)

Codification
- Acts affected: National Environmental Policy Act of 1969, Endangered Species Act of 1973
- U.S.C. sections affected: 42 U.S.C. § 4321 et seq., 16 U.S.C. § 1531 et seq.
- Agencies affected: United States Department of the Interior, w:United States Congress

Legislative history
- Introduced in the House as H.R. 251 by Rep. Jason Chaffetz (R-UT) on January 15, 2013; Committee consideration by United States House Committee on Natural Resources, United States House Natural Resources Subcommittee on Water and Power; Passed the House on June 11, 2013 (404-0 Roll Call Vote 212); Passed the Senate on July 10, 2013 (Unanimous Consent); Signed into law by President Barack Obama on July 18, 2013

The South Utah Valley Electric Conveyance Act (H.R. 251; Pub. L. 113–19 (text) (PDF)) is a United States Public Law that was introduced into the United States House of Representatives of the 113th United States Congress. The law transfers ownership of certain electric system equipment, transmission lines, and land (or access to said land) from the federal government to the local organizations in Utah that have been maintaining it for decades. This transfer is the result of mistakes made in the sale of that land from 1986. The law passed in the House on June 11, 2013, and passed in the United States Senate on July 10, 2013.

== Background ==
The United States Bureau of Reclamation started the Strawberry Valley Project in 1906. The Strawberry Water Users Association (SWUA) owned and operated part of this electrical system until 1986, when it sold it to the South Utah Electric Service District. Due to some complicated paperwork mistakes, all parties involved believed that the South Utah Electric Service District believed that it had purchased more of the land and facilities than it actually had. This bill is meant to resolve this issue by transferring the remaining pieces to the South Utah Electric Service District.

An identical version of this bill was introduced in the Senate by Senator Orrin Hatch (R-UT) - S. 25. It passed the Senate on June 19, 2013, by unanimous consent.

== Provisions/Elements of the bill ==
This summary is based largely on the summary provided by the Congressional Research Service, a public domain source.

The South Utah Valley Electric Conveyance Act would require the Secretary of the Interior, insofar as the Strawberry Water Users Association conveyed its interest in an electric distribution system to the South Utah Valley Electric Service District, to convey and assign to the District: (1) all interest of the United States in all fixtures owned by the United States as part of the electric distribution system and the federal lands and interests where the fixtures are located, (2) license for use in perpetuity of the shared power poles, and (3) licenses for use and access in perpetuity to specified project lands and interests and corridors where federal lands and interests are abutting public streets and roads and can provide access to facilities.

=== Congressional Budget Office report ===
H.R. 251 would direct the Secretary of the Interior to transfer title to the electric distribution system located in Spanish Fork, Utah, to the South Utah Valley Electric Service District. Based on information from the Bureau of Reclamation, CBO estimates that implementing the legislation would have no significant net impact on the federal budget. Enacting H.R. 251 would have an insignificant impact on direct spending; therefore, pay-as-you-go procedures apply. The legislation would not affect revenues.

The electric distribution system was developed as part of the Strawberry Valley Project in the 1920s. The Strawberry Water Users Association, the nonfederal sponsor of the project, satisfied all federal repayment obligations associated with the project in 1974. In 1986, the Bureau of Reclamation transferred financial responsibility for operating and maintaining the system to the South Utah Valley Electric Service District. Under current law, the bureau oversees those activities.

Under the legislation, transfer to the district of title to the electric distribution system would include all federally owned fixtures and the underlying federal land not shared by other facilities. In instances where the underlying federal land is also occupied by other facilities and in the case of shared power poles, permanent access and licensing privileges would be granted to the district to perform required maintenance.

Under H.R. 251, the Bureau of Reclamation would no longer oversee the facilities or collect licensing fees from utilities seeking easements. Based on information from the bureau, CBO estimates that the loss of those collections would not be significant.

== Procedural history ==
The South Utah Valley Electric Conveyance Act was introduced into the United States House of Representatives on January 15, 2013, by Rep. Jason Chaffetz (R-UT). It was immediately referred to the United States House Committee on Natural Resources, and then to the United States House Natural Resources Subcommittee on Water and Power on January 31, 2013. On May 17, 2013, it was reported by the Committee on Natural Resources alongside House Report 113-78. On June 10, 2013, the official website of Majority Leader Eric Cantor announced that the bill would be on the floor schedule for Tuesday June 11, 2013. On June 11, 2013, the bill passed the House under a suspension of the rules in Roll Call Vote 212 with a final tally of 404–0.

The South Utah Valley Electric Conveyance Act was received in the Senate on June 12, 2013. It was placed on the Senate Legislative Calendar under General Orders, on Calendar No. 85. The Senate voted by unanimous consent on July 10, 2013, to pass the bill, and it was sent to the President to receive his signature or veto.

President Barack Obama signed the bill into law on July 18, 2013.

== Debate and discussion ==
Speaking in favor of the bill, Senator Hatch said that "giving the South Utah Valley Electric District ownership of its systems just makes sense." Representative Chaffetz, another supporter of the bill, said that the "South Utah Valley Electric Conveyance Act (is) vital for securing diverse energy sources to meet the demands of Utah’s growing population."

In a statement on his Facebook page, Rep. Justin Amash (R-MI) explained his vote in favor of the bill by saying "the bill holds these non-federal entities harmless for a mistake the federal government made when it oversaw the 1986 sale. Transferring ownership of the system—which no longer brings in any federal revenue—will also reduce costs to the government associated with maintaining the system and administering the land."

== See also ==
- List of bills in the 113th United States Congress
