= Bonneville Unit Clean Hydropower Facilitation Act =

Utah renewable energy legislation

- Long title: To authorize the Secretary of the Interior to facilitate the development of hydroelectric power on the Diamond Fork System of the Central Utah Project.
- Announced in: the 113th United States Congress
- Sponsored by: Rep. Jason Chaffetz (R, UT-3)
- Number of co-sponsors: 0

Citations
- Public law: 113-20

Codification
- Acts affected: Central Utah Project Completion Act of 1992, Internal Revenue Code of 1986, Statutory Pay-As-You-Go Act of 2010, Hoover Power Plant Act of 1984
- U.S.C. sections affected: 42 U.S.C. § 16421a,
- Agencies affected: United States Department of the Interior

Legislative history
- Introduced in the House as H.R. 254 by Rep. Jason Chaffetz (R-UT) on January 15, 2013; Committee consideration by United States House Committee on the Budget, United States House Committee on Natural Resources, United States House Natural Resources Subcommittee on Water and Power; Passed the House on April 9, 2013 (Roll Call Vote 90:400-4); Passed the Senate on July 10, 2013 (Unanimous consent); Signed into law by President Barack Obama on July 18, 2013

The Bonneville Unit Clean Hydropower Facilitation Act (H.R. 254) was a bill introduced in the 113th United States Congress which passed in the United States House of Representatives on April 9, 2013. The purpose of the act was to authorize the United States Department of the Interior to facilitate the development of hydroelectric power on the Diamond Fork System of the Central Utah Project. The Central Utah Project is a United States federal water project responsible for power generation, water for irrigation and community use, flood control, and recreation. The bill would alter some of the financial requirements of building a plant in order to facilitate private development.

The bill was signed into law on July 22, 2013, becoming Public Law 113-20.

== Background ==
According to information provided by House Republicans, this bill was necessary to remove financial barriers that were preventing the development of hydropower in this geographic region. Additional background information can be found in House Committee Report 113-25.

== Provisions/Elements of the bill ==
This summary is based largely on the summary provided by the Congressional Research Service, a public domain source.

The Bonneville Unit Clean Hydropower Facilitation Act states that its goal is to facilitate hydropower development on the Diamond Fork System in Utah. In order to do this, the act would change some laws regarding the budget of the program. More specifically, one of the changes the bill makes is to say that a certain amount of reimbursable costs allocated to project power in the Power Appendix of the October 2004 Supplement to the 1988 Bonneville Unit Definite Plan Report shall be considered final costs, as well as specified costs in excess of the total maximum repayment obligation, subject to the same terms and conditions.

There are several additional provisions in the bill. In section 4, it states two things. First, that the Act does not obligate the Western Area Power Administration to purchase or market any of the power produced by the Diamond Fork power plant. Secondly, the act states that none of the costs associated with development of transmission facilities to transmit power from the Diamond Fork power plant shall be assigned to power for the purpose of the Colorado River Storage Project and its ratemaking.

In section 5 of the bill, it prohibits any hydroelectric power generation or transmission facility on the Diamond Fork System from being financed or refinanced with any obligation whose interest enjoys federal tax-exempt status or which enjoys certain federal tax credits.

Section 6 orders the Department of the Interior to report to the United States House Committee on Natural Resources and the United States Senate Committee on Energy and Natural Resources if hydropower production on the Diamond Fork System has not commenced 24 months after enactment of this Act, stating the reasons such production has not commenced, and presenting a detailed timeline for future hydropower production.

Section 8 of the act restricts where the funding of these activities can come from. It prohibits the use of Western Area Power Administration borrowing authority under the Hoover Power Plant Act of 1984 to fund any study or construction of transmission facilities developed as a result of the Act.

== Congressional Budget Office report ==
The Congressional Budget Office reported that it expected that enacting H.R. 254 would lead to the development of hydropower facilities at the Diamond Fork Project in Utah by a nonfederal entity within a few years, sooner than was expected under current law. Based on information CBO received from the United States Bureau of Reclamation, the CBO estimated that the federal government would receive payments from the hydropower developer of about $4 million over the 2014-2023 period. Enacting the bill would decrease direct spending (by increasing offsetting receipts); therefore, pay-as-you-go procedures apply. Enacting the bill would not affect revenues.

== Procedural history ==
=== House ===
The Bonneville Unit Clean Hydropower Facilitation Act was introduced into the House on January 15, 2013 by Rep. Jason Chaffetz (R-UT). It was referred to two House committees and one subcommittee - the United States House Committee on the Budget, the United States House Committee on Natural Resources, and the United States House Natural Resources Subcommittee on Water and Power. The bill was passed by the House on April 9, 2013 with a vote of 400-4 in Roll Call Vote 90. One Republican and three Democrats voted against it.

=== Senate ===
The Bonneville Unit Clean Hydropower Facilitation Act was received in the Senate on April 10, 2013.

== Debate ==
The House Republicans, on their official website, made a statement of support for the passage of H.R. 254. They argued that the bill would remove financial hurdles that are currently preventing developers from starting hydropower projects in the area due to their high costs. The bill would also generate some revenue for the government that it is not making currently.

An alternative plan to have the government develop a plant at taxpayer expense, and then attempt to pay itself back with revenue from selling the hydropower, was also considered.

== See also ==
- Electric power transmission
- Electrical substation
- Energy policy of the United States
- Central Utah Project
- Hydropower policy in the United States#Bonneville Unit Clean Hydropower Facilitation Act
