= Title 38 of the United States Code =

U.S. federal statutes on veterans' benefits

Title 38 of the United States Code outlines the role of Veterans' Benefits in the United States Code.

- Part I: General Provisions
- Part II: General Benefits
- Part III: Readjustment and Related Benefits
- Part IV: General Administrative Provisions
- Part V: Boards, Administrations, and Services
- Part VI: Acquisition And Disposition of Property
