= Albuquerque, New Mexico, Federal Land Conveyance Act of 2014 =

- Long title: To authorize the Administrator of General Services to convey a parcel of real property in Albuquerque, New Mexico, to the Amy Biehl High School Foundation.
- Announced in: the 113th United States Congress
- Sponsored by: Rep. Michelle Lujan Grisham (D, NM-1)
- Number of co-sponsors: 0

Codification
- U.S.C. sections affected: 40 U.S.C. § 592
- Agencies affected: General Services Administration

Legislative history
- Introduced in the House as H.R. 3998 by Rep. Michelle Lujan Grisham (D, NM-1) on February 5, 2014; Committee consideration by United States House Committee on Transportation and Infrastructure, United States House Transportation Subcommittee on Economic Development, Public Buildings and Emergency Management

The Albuquerque, New Mexico, Federal Land Conveyance Act of 2014 (H.R. 3998) is a bill that would direct the General Services Administration (GSA) to sell a federal property in downtown Albuquerque, New Mexico, to the Amy Biehl High School Foundation for its fair market value. The high school has been using that federal location as a school building since 2006 and has plans to expand. The GSA decided that it would be better to sell the building than continue to rent it to the school.

The bill was introduced into the United States House of Representatives during the 113th United States Congress.

== Background ==
Amy Biehl High School is a charter high school (275 students, grades 9-12) in Albuquerque, New Mexico. The school is now housed in the Old Post Office building in Downtown Albuquerque. The dual mission of the school revolves around service and scholarship, the creation of "conscious scholars." The school is named after Amy Biehl, a young woman who was murdered in South Africa in 1993.

== Provisions of the bill ==
This summary is based largely on the summary provided by the Congressional Research Service, a public domain source.

The Albuquerque, New Mexico, Federal Land Conveyance Act of 2014 would direct the Administrator of General Services (GSA) to offer to convey to the Amy Biehl High School Foundation certain federal lands, including any improvements on such lands, located in Albuquerque, New Mexico.

The bill would require such conveyance to be in accordance with a fair market value appraisal that is acceptable to the Administrator.

The bill would make the Foundation responsible for the costs related to such conveyance.

The bill would require the proceeds from such conveyance to be paid into the Federal Buildings Fund.

The bill would require the conveyance to occur within three years of this Act's enactment.

== Congressional Budget Office report ==
This summary is based largely on the summary provided by the Congressional Budget Office, as ordered reported by the House Committee on Transportation and Infrastructure on March 13, 2014. This is a public domain source.

The bill would direct the General Services Administration (GSA) to sell a federal property in downtown Albuquerque, New Mexico, to the Amy Biehl High School Foundation for its fair market value. The Congressional Budget Office (CBO) estimates that enacting the legislation would increase offsetting receipts, a credit against direct spending; therefore, pay-as-you-go procedures apply. We estimate that the net offsetting receipts from the sale would be negligible. Enacting H.R. 3998 would not affect revenues.

H.R. 3998 would authorize GSA to sell an historic post office and courthouse in downtown Albuquerque, New Mexico. The legislation would require the designated purchaser to cover any federal administrative costs associated with the sale. Proceeds from the sale—probably about $50,000—would be deposited in the Federal Buildings Fund and would be available to GSA, subject to future appropriation. In addition, GSA currently receives about $1,200 a year under a 60-year lease to the foundation. By selling the property, the government would forgo those receipts in future years.

H.R. 3998 contains no intergovernmental or private-sector mandates as defined in the Unfunded Mandates Reform Act and would impose no costs on state, local, or tribal governments.

On February 20, 2014, CBO transmitted a cost estimate for S. 898, the Albuquerque, New Mexico, Federal Land Exchange Conveyance Act of 2013, as ordered reported by the Senate Committee on Environment and Public Works. Both bills contain similar provisions, and their estimated costs are the same.

== Procedural history ==
The Albuquerque, New Mexico, Federal Land Conveyance Act of 2014 was introduced into the United States House of Representatives on February 5, 2014 by Rep. Michelle Lujan Grisham (D, NM-1). The bill was referred to the United States House Committee on Transportation and Infrastructure and the United States House Transportation Subcommittee on Economic Development, Public Buildings and Emergency Management. The bill was reported (amended) by the Committee on Transportation on April 9, 2014 alongside House Report 113-408. The House was scheduled to vote on the bill under a suspension of the rules on June 17, 2014.

== See also ==
- List of bills in the 113th United States Congress
