= Qwabe (surname) =

Qwabe is a surname of Zulu origin. Notable people with the surname include:

- Mziwamadoda Qwabe, South African man convicted for the Honeymoon murder
- Ntokozo Qwabe (born 1991), South African Rhodes scholar

(Qwabe) Bongani Qwabe; I wish to differ and correct the assumption that Qwabe is a surname of Zulu origin. (Qwabe is actually a surname of AbeNguni origin.) Not Zulu because Zulu was a younger brother of Qwabe therefore Qwabe could not originate from Zulu.Therefore Qwabe is a Nguni; not a Zulu.
