= Mother to Mother =

1998 book by Sindiwe Magona

- Author: Sindiwe Magona
- Language: English
- Genre: Epistolary novel
- Publisher: David Philip Publishers (South Africa)
- Publication date: 1998 (South Africa)
- Publication place: South Africa
- Pages: 210 (US Edition)
- ISBN: 978-0-8070-0949-9
- Followed by: play adaptation

Mother to Mother is an epistolary novel by South African writer Sindiwe Magona.

== Background ==
As stated in the novel's preface, the fictional story of Mother to Mother is based on the real events from 1993 peaking in Amy Biehl's death in Cape Town's Gugulethu.

== Setting and narrative situation ==
The story is told by Mandisa, mother of Mxolisi, who has killed an (unnamed) daughter of the addressee, another (unnamed) mother. It is switched between several layers of time - Mandisa's youth around 1968, Mxolisi's youth and the present. The twelve numbered chapters feature occasional subheadings, usually consisting of times or place names and dates, all set around Gugulethu in August 1993. Among them are Mowbray and Gungululu. Only the first chapter is written as an obvious letter, in which Mandisa, the first-person speaker, directly talks to the addressee. This narrative situation is kept up again at the end, when the addressee is spoken to directly.

== Language ==
In between the English story appear words marked in italics: e.g. terms like hokkie, bhuti, Bajita, mlungu, Ewe ... or whole phrases in Xhosa language.

== Plot ==
Chapter 1 starts off with Mandisa Ntloko addressing the mother (Linda Biehl) of a murdered young woman (Amy Biehl). Mandisa's son Mxolisi has been involved in the killing, over which she expresses her condolences. By telling the story of Mandisa's own upbringing and the childhood and youth of Mxolisi, she would like to cast light on their troubled circumstances, deeply interrelated with apartheid, racial segregation, police violence and brutality, injustice, institutionalised poverty and marginalisation. She says about the young killers' that their world and "environment failed to nurture them in the higher ideals of humanity and [that these young men] instead, became lost creatures of malice and destruction." Even "parents teach their children to hate all whites." Mandisa depicts her living situation in Guguletu. She is living with her three children (her sons Mxolisi, 20 and Lunga, 14, and her daughter Siziwe) in a hut. Mandisa works as a maid in a white household for Mrs. Nelson. The differences between the two women's wealthy fortune are quite apart from each other. When Mandisa returns home, she hears about violence in her township, which is common, only one person has died apparently. When she finds her oldest son not at home, Mandisa is worried in fear of him being one of the killers. Later, the police brutally raid her home, beating up her children. In between the chapters, flashbacks take the reader back to Mandisa's childhood. Living quite happily with her father (Tata) and her mother (Mama) and her grandparents around (Tata's father and Makhulu, Tata's mother). In 1968 she is forced out of her hometown, following chaotic and troubled circumstances. Mandisa's brother Khaya eventually marries Mandisa's school friend Nono and they have a child. In fear of Mandisa becoming pregnant as well, she is being sent to live with her grandmother Makhulu away. Her boyfriend China, though, is getting her pregnant by accident in her teenage years, despite not sleeping together. Being a virgin is quite important to her mother, embarrassingly examining her hymen. After Mxolisi's birth, China is trying to provide for the family and they marry on Father Mark Savage's urging, but China leaves her eventually after she has been living with his family, her in-laws, though merely working as a housemaid for them. She leaves as well and, with her next partner Lungile, has her son Lunga, and, later, her daughter Siziwe with Dwadwa, her second husband. Mxolisi's life is not less troubled. His teenage friends Mzamo and Zazi are shot by police in front of his eyes, leaving him deeply disturbed, wetting his bed and not being able to talk for some time, until his stepfather Lungile forces him to eat a mouse. Mxolisi follows Lungile's example, who leaves to become a freedom fighter, and engages with street gangs, for which he quits school (Liberation now, education later and One Settler, One Bullet are some of their slogans). Mandisa has a talk with her Tatomkhulu about how whites took their land and left them with nothing. Deep down, Mxolisi knows that despite him being good at school, he doesn't have any job prospects. In the streets, Mxolisi seems to be popular and brave, saving a girl from being raped. Later, he is with rioters in the streets, who throw stones at a young white woman's car and stab her when she tries to get away. Mandisa and even her other children are outcasts in her community due to Mxolisi being a murderer.

== Legacy ==
The novel Mother to Mother has been praised for its contribution to bringing ethnicities together and promoting understanding of institutional injustice, such as apartheid. It has been placed on reading lists in secondary schools and higher education courses. In Germany's state Lower Saxony it has been officially chosen as an essential novel to read for the Abitur exam in English in 2022 and 2023.
