= Goodwood Centre of Excellence =

Prison in Cape Town, South Africa

- Interactive map of Goodwood Centre of Excellence
- Location: Cape Town, South Africa; 33.885°S 18.541°E,
- Security class: Centre of Excellence
- Capacity: 2,115
- Population: 4,089
- Opened: 1997
- Managed by: Department of Correctional Services (South Africa)
- Warden: Takalani Mashamba

Goodwood Centre of Excellence or Goodwood Correctional Centre is a medium security prison in Edgemead, Cape Town and run by the South African Department of Correctional Services. Despite its location in Edgemead the prison is named after the nearby neighbourhood of Goodwood.

== Background ==
The centre was established in 1997 to accommodate awaiting trial detainees. Due to overcrowding within the South African prison system – most notably at Pollsmoor, Drakenstein, Helderstroom – the centre was converted into a "Centre of Excellence". Thereby allowing it to better accommodate sentenced prisoners in addition to awaiting trial detainees. Due to the prison's focus on prisoner education and reform as well as its better quality prison facilities it has been dubbed a "five-star jail" by the South African media. By 2010/11 the prison had a 113% occupancy rate.

== Notable inmates ==
- Xolile Mngeni
