= Gugulethu Seven =

Group of South African freedom fighters

The Gugulethu Seven was an anti-apartheid group of men between the ages of 16 and 23 who were shot and killed on 3 March 1986 by members of the South African Police force. The seven men included Mandla Simon Mxinwa, Zanisile Zenith Mjobo, Zola Alfred Swelani, Godfrey Jabulani Miya, Christopher Piet, Themba Mlifi and Zabonke John Konile. It was later uncovered that the police operation that unearthed the Gugulethu Seven's plans had been in the works for some time.

== Prelude ==
In the mid 1970s and 80's, there was a rise in uMkhonto we Sizwe or MK operatives, the 1961-founded, armed wing of the ANC. In response, General Griebenouw of the Western Cape Security called upon Brigadier Schoon of the Security Branch Headquarters in Pretoria as well as the assistance of the Vlakplaas, a government death squad. Vlakplaas commander, Eugene de Kock chose Rian Bellingan to lead an operative team ordered to intervene with anti-apartheid operations. The men chosen as part of the team were Thapelo Johannes Mbelo, Joe Coetzer, and other Vlakplaas askaris like Gladstone Moss, Eric 'Shakes' Maluleke and Jimmy Mbane.

The operative team was based in Koeberg and in early January 1986, drove into Cape Town aboard three vehicles; one was a minibus with weapons and explosives concealed inside. After failed attempts to infiltrate Mbelo into the Gugulethu Seven, Mbane and Maluleke were sent in.

Mbane and Maluleke, who reported to Bellingan and Liebenberg, were successful at slipping in and gaining the trust of the Gugulethu Seven over time. At first they were given weapons and grenades and went to the home of Yamile (the squatter leader). There, they told Yamile that they were commanders from exile and showed him their weapons in the minibus. Yamile then introduced Mbane and Maluleke to Piet, a member and the supposed leader of the Gugulethu Seven. It is said that Mbane and Maluleke even helped fix Piet's faulty AK-47 at one point.

Over the next two months, Mbane trained the youth in basic military combat while Maluleke gave them a political education; Piet seemed to be the only youth with previous combat training. Mbane and Maluleke also had the youth write their biographies, standard practice in liberation movements. It was later discovered that Mbane gave those to Bellingan.

Eventually, an attack was planned for 3 March that would target a police bus that took senior policemen to Gugulethu station every morning. Mbane told Bellingan and Liebenberg this, who prepared for the event.

== Incident ==
On 3 March 1986, 25 heavily armed police were briefed and deployed at Wingfield Naval Base at 3 a.m. The intended target area was surrounded and occupied by police by 5 a.m. Mbane, driving a stolen bakery van, dropped the seven youth off at the site around 7:25 a.m. Allegedly, grenades were thrown by the Gugulethu Seven and the police started firing from all sides. Reports say that Piet was the only one who had time to fire back. The police officers at the scene included: Warrant Officers Barnard and McMaster, Majors Johan Kleyn, Dolf Odendal, and Stephanus Brits, Captain Charles Brazzelle, Sergeants John Sterrenberg, Andre Grobbellar and Rian Bellingan, and Constable Thapelo Mbelo.

For their help in exposing and leading the Gugulethu Seven into the fire, Mbane and Maluleke were given ZAR7000 - one thousand for each victim.

It was later reported that Piet suffered 12 bullet wounds to his head.

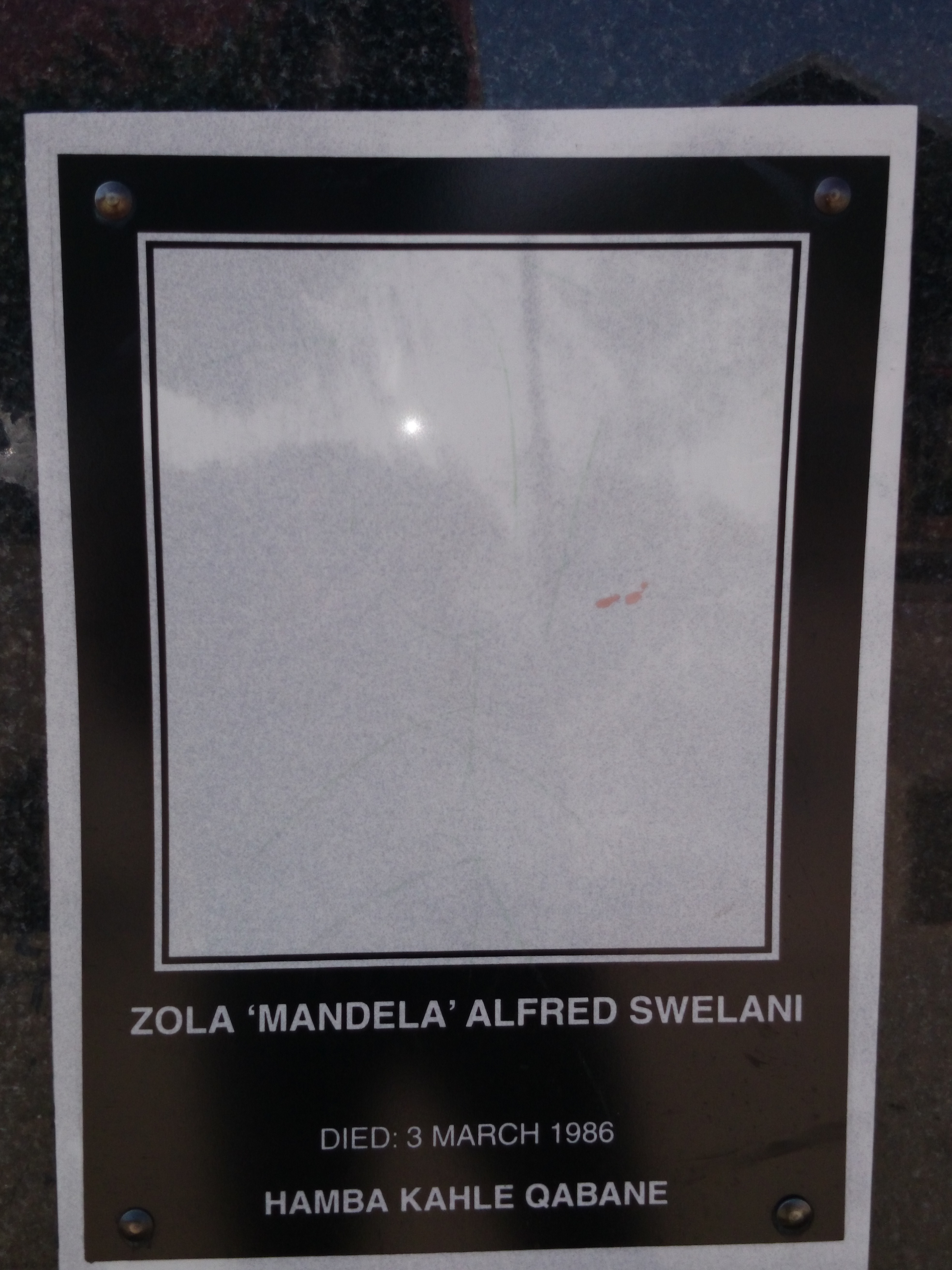
Zola Alfred Swelani

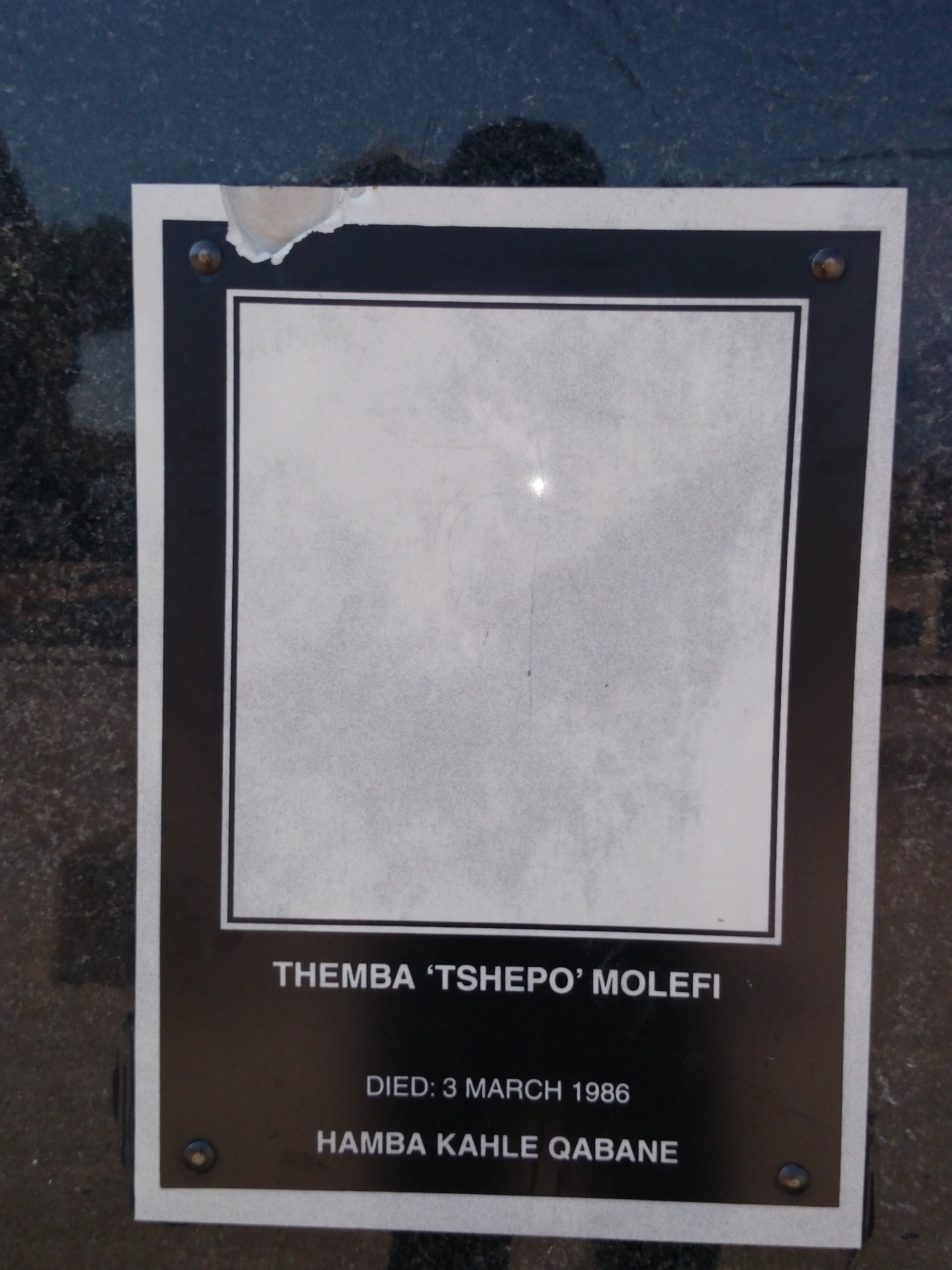
Themba Molefi

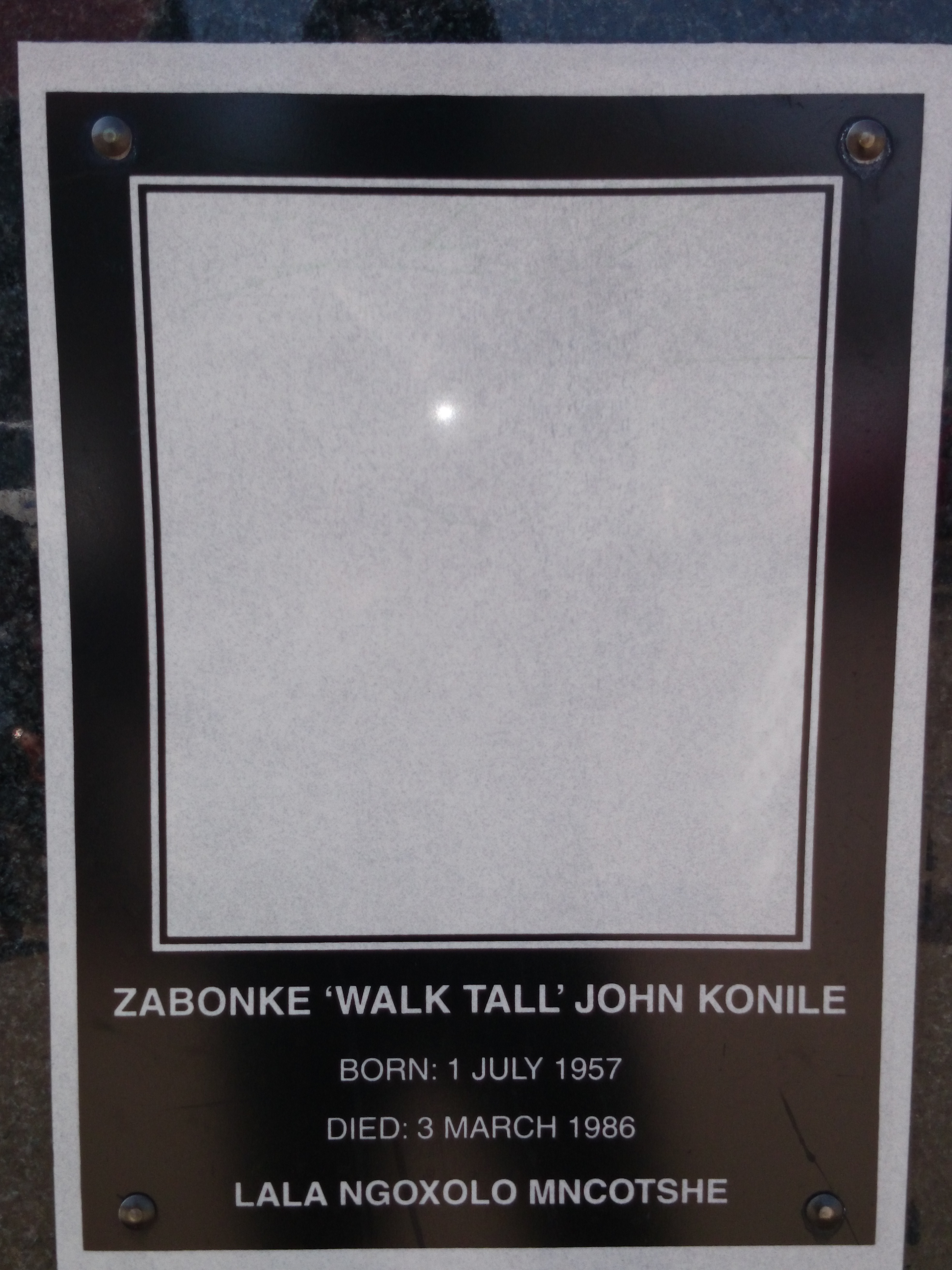
Zabonke John Konile

== Aftermath and mother's testimony ==
Piet and the Gugulethu Seven's deaths led to an inquest in 1986, and a trial in 1987, which later reopened in 1989. The findings by Wynberg magistrate, Mr. Hoffman, were that the seven men had died in a legitimate anti-terrorist operation. In her 27 November 1996 Truth and Reconciliation Commission Gross Human Rights Violations testimony, Piet's mother Cynthia Nomveyu Ngewu said the trials in court were dissatisfying and she couldn't understand the language being spoken; the proceedings were in Afrikaans.

Ngewu said she had to see her dead son being dragged with a rope around his waist, broadcast on television. The police told her that her son had shot at the police and they later came by her home to look for weapons. Ngewu later expressed her forgiveness and reconciliatory beliefs in regards to her son's killing:

"We do not want to return the evil that perpetrators committed to the nation. We want to demonstrate humanness towards them, so that they in turn may restore their own humanity".

The South African Police that applied for amnesty for the killings were Rian Bellingan, Thapelo Mbelo, and Xola Frank 'Jimmy' Mbane. They received the amnesty.

== Memorial ==
On 21 March 2005, Human Rights Day in South Africa, a monument was erected in Gugulethu honoring the lives of the Gugulethu Seven. It is outside the Gugulethu police station on the corner of NY1 and NY111 right near where the Seven, including Christopher 'Rasta' Piet, were shot.

== Movie ==
In 2000, a film of the events surrounding the Gugulethu Seven, directed by Lindy Wilson, was released.

== See also ==
- Gugulethu
