= Mzoli's =

Butchery in Cape Town, South Africa

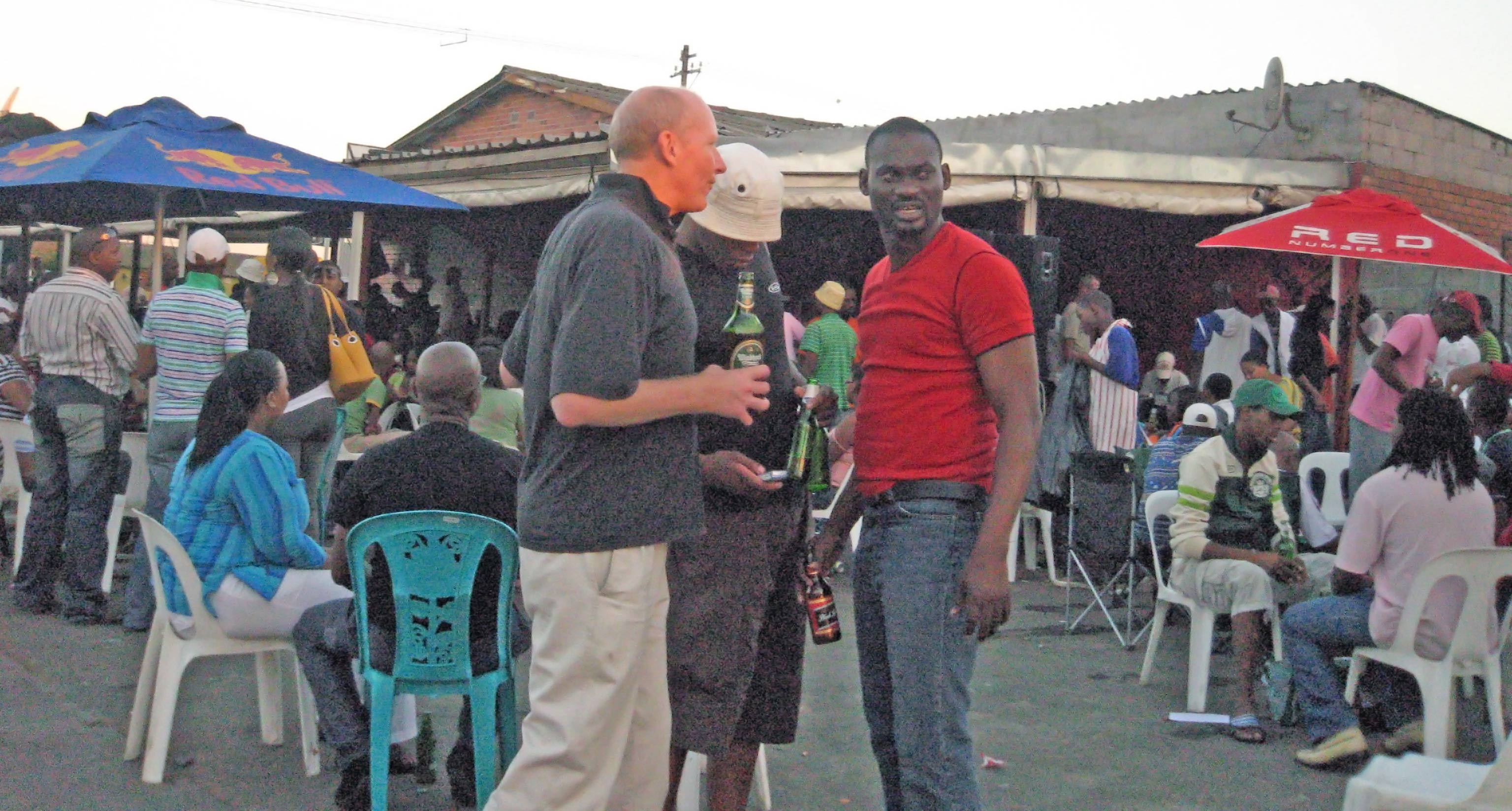
- Tourists outside Mzoli's in April 2006
- Interactive map of Mzoli's
- Location: Gugulethu township, Cape Town, South Africa
- Coordinates: 33°58′35″S 18°34′11″E
- Owner: Mzoli Ngcawuzele
- Capacity: Several hundred
- Type: Butcher shop Restaurant; Nightclub
- Events: Deep house Kwaito

Construction
- Opened: 2003
- Closed: 2021

Mzoli's (Note: Also known as Mzoli's Place, Mzoli's Meat, Mzoli's Butchery or Kwa-Mzoli.) was a butchery in Gugulethu, a township on the outskirts of Cape Town, South Africa. Since Mzoli's opened in early 2003, the restaurant had become a popular gathering spot for Cape Town residents and a tourist attraction. It was praised by international visitors including restaurateur Jamie Oliver. Mzoli's was criticized by local residents and the media for its lack of safety, due to the prevalence of gangs. The restaurant closed indefinitely in May 2021 due to several factors. Its founder, Edwin "Mzoli" Ngcawuzele, died in June 2026, aged 72.

== History ==
Mzoli's opened in early 2003 in Gugulethu, a neighbourhood around 20 kilometres (12 mi) from the centre of Cape Town. Mzoli's was a "do-it-yourself" eatery, providing meat to customers, who then enlisted independent vendors operating braai stalls on-site to grill the meat and prepare meals. Mzoli's owner, Mzoli Ngcawuzele, obtained start-up funding from the Development Bank of South Africa. An economic study by the University of Cape Town said that Ngcawuzele had moved "from selling meat informally from a garage, to owning one of the most popular hangouts in Cape Town".

On November 19, 2006, over 40 people, including tourists and Democratic Alliance councillor Masizole Mnqasela were arrested in a police raid outside Mzoli's for drinking in public. The restaurant did not sell alcoholic drinks, but Ngcawuzele explained that he could not stop people from bringing their own. Three years later, Mnqasela sued the police for his wrongful arrest. He won the lawsuit, and received 100,000 South African rand in compensation.

In May 2017, a person from Johannesburg was stabbed outside Mzoli's, leading to concerns about the area's safety. In 2018, Mzoli's was temporarily closed due to a car in front of the butchery being set alight in a protest for better housing. In 2020, amidst rumours that Mzoli Ngcawuzele had died, the Daily Sun reported that he was "still alive and well" and was celebrating his 66th birthday.

In May 2021, the restaurant was closed indefinitely. Mzoli Ngcawuzele's daughter Sisanda Mangele said it closed due to "a lot of things, from physical safety to the state of the economy and restrictions of the pandemic". A restaurant called Teez Lounge has since occupied the site where Mzoli's was.

== Death ==
Ngcawuzele died at his home in Gugulethu on 7 June 2026, aged 72, following a long illness. His death prompted tributes from local government and business figures, who credited him with pioneering township tourism in Gugulethu and inspiring a generation of township entrepreneurs. Western Cape Minister of Cultural Affairs and Sport Ricardo Mackenzie said Ngcawuzele had put "Gugulethu on the global map" and created jobs that inspired young entrepreneurs, while the African National Congress's Dullah Omar Region described his legacy as one of "innovation, empowerment, and community upliftment". He was also remembered for his long involvement in local sport through the Gugulethu Amateur Athletic Club.

== Reception ==
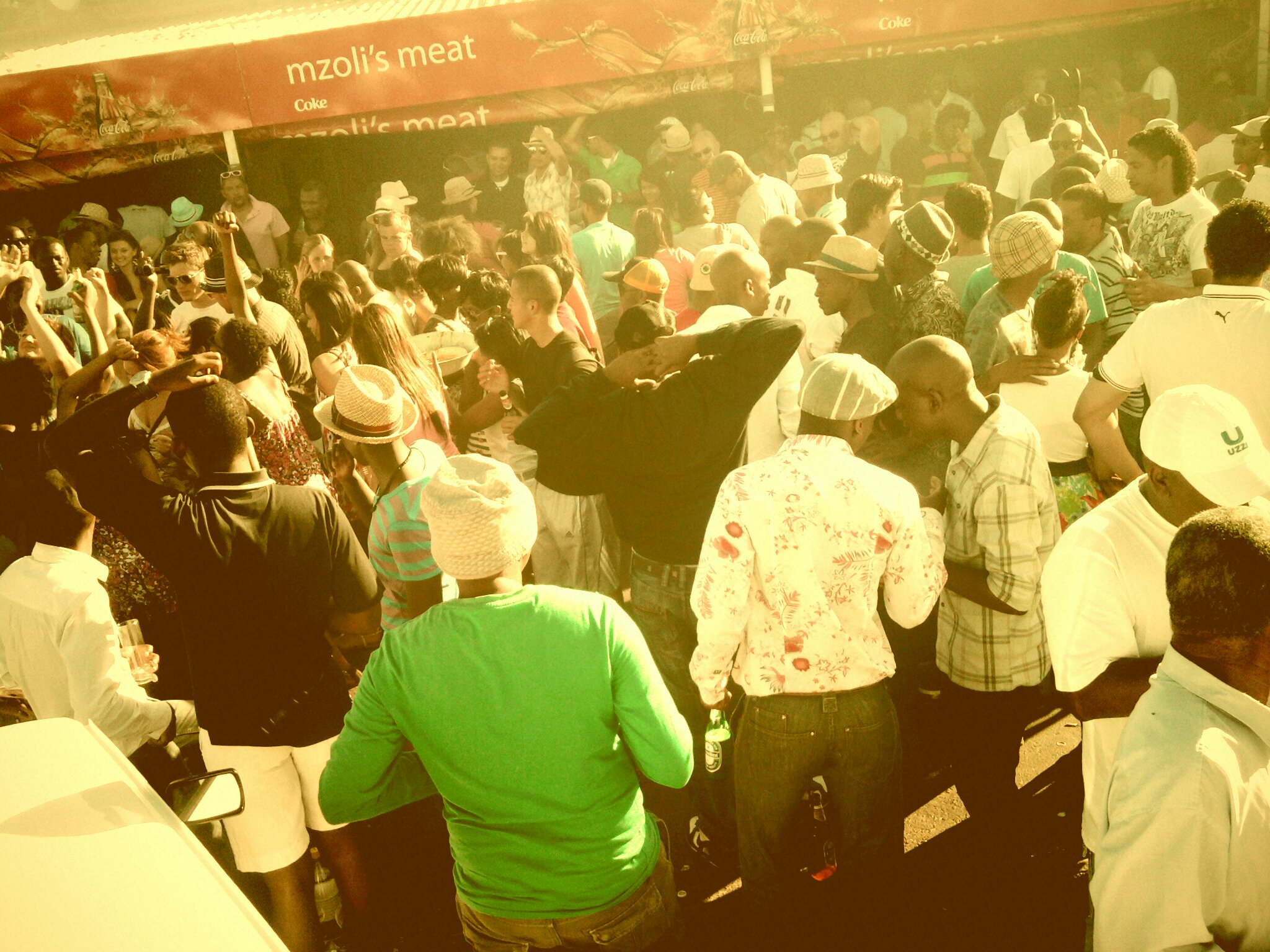
Mzoli's in 2010

Mzoli's became one of Cape Town's most popular gathering spots. Customers played music from their parked cars, and the butchery became known as a hub for deep house and kwaito music. It attracted locals, television stars, DJs, politicians, business people, tourists, and college students.

British chef Jamie Oliver featured Mzoli's on the cover of his magazine in April 2009. He described Mzoli's as "sexy" and praised the "incredible flavor" of the meat. He added that due to the hot temperature in South Africa, the locals cannot hang meat like in Europe, so they would just "kill it, gut it, skin it and eat it". Tina Walsh of The Guardian called it "a big open-air shack" which "has a devoted following".

=== In popular culture ===
A Wikipedia article on the shop was created by the encyclopedia's co-founder Jimmy Wales in 2007, which led to a debate on the crowdsourced project's inclusion criteria.

== See also ==
- List of butcher shops

Media related to Mzoli's at Wikimedia Commons
