= Ray Ntlokwana =

South African actor (1937-2000)

- Born: Mvuyiswa Renek Ntlokwana; 5 May 1937; Gugulethu, Western Cape, South Africa
- Died: 20 July 2000 (aged 63); Gugulethu, South Africa
- Other names: Ray, Velaphi
- Occupation: Actor
- Known for: Portraying the lead actor "Velaphi Mjongeni" on SABC's Xhosa play, Velaphi.
- Notable work: Velaphi, Ingqumbo Yeminyanya
- Spouse: Ntombizodwa Shirley Ntlokwana

Mvuyiswa Renek “Ray” Ntlokwana (5 May 1937 – 20 July 2000) was a South African actor from Gugulethu, who was affectionately known as “Velaphi” following his lead role in the SABC Xhosa comedy, Velaphi, a name he was associated with throughout his career. Ntlokwana also starred in the award-winning television Xhosa drama Trouble in Constantia in which he played a rural man from the mud huts of the former Ciskei who won money in a lottery and bought a mansion in Constantia, an upmarket suburb in Cape Town. In 1996, the film won Ntlokwana the Artist Award for Best Actor in a Comedy. Ntlokwana was also known for his roles in many other movies, TV and stage plays, including Kwa-sindw'ezama, Senzekile, Living the Blues and Abakwazidenge. In another Xhosa film, Ingqumbo Yeminyanya, Ntlokwana played an old stubborn man, Ngxabane, from a rural area who fiercely opposed any attempts to move from tradition to modernisation.

== Awards ==
In March 2000, Ntlokwana was also awarded with the provincial merit award by the Western Cape provincial government for his contribution to drama in the Western Cape over the years.

== Death ==
Ntlokwana died on 20 July 2000 at the age of 63 years at his home in Gugulethu from colon cancer. He was survived by his wife, Ntombizodwa Shirley Ntlokwana, and children. He was buried on the 29th later that month.
