= Edgemead =

Garden Cities Suburb In Cape Town, South Africa

- Location within Cape Town Location within Western Cape Location within South Africa Location within Africa
- Coordinates: 33°52′32″S 18°32′27″E
- Country: South Africa
- Province: Western Cape
- Municipality: City of Cape Town
- Main Place: Milnerton

Area
  - Total: 4.01 km^{2} (1.55 sq mi)

Population (2011)
  - Total: 9,884
  - Density: 2,460/km^{2} (6,380/sq mi)

Racial makeup (2011)
  - African: 3.2%
  - Coloured (khoe): 7.2%
  - Indian/Asian: 1.1%
  - White: 86.7%
  - Other: 1.7%

First languages (2011)
  - English: 87.0%
  - Afrikaans: 10.4%
  - Other: 2.5%
- Time zone: UTC+2 (SAST)
- Postal code (street): 7441
- PO box: 7407
- Website: www.edgemead.co.za

Edgemead is a Northern Suburb of the City of Cape Town. It is one of several garden cities of South Africa, the first being Pinelands in the southern suburbs. Edgemead is mainly residential, and is known for its trees, gardens and generally pleasant environment.

Edgemead has the Edgemead Cricket Club (ECC), which has recently been promoted to the Premier league. And Edgemead Goodwood Peninsula Park Villa, an Association football club located in Edgemead that plays in the Premier Division of the Tygerberg Cape Town FA. The neighbourhood is also the location of the Goodwood Centre of Excellence, a medium security prison run by the South African Department of Correctional Services.

== Notable residents ==
- Geordin Hill-Lewis, politician and Mayor of Cape Town.
