= Amy Biehl High School =

High School in New Mexico

Coordinates: 35.0837°N 106.652°W

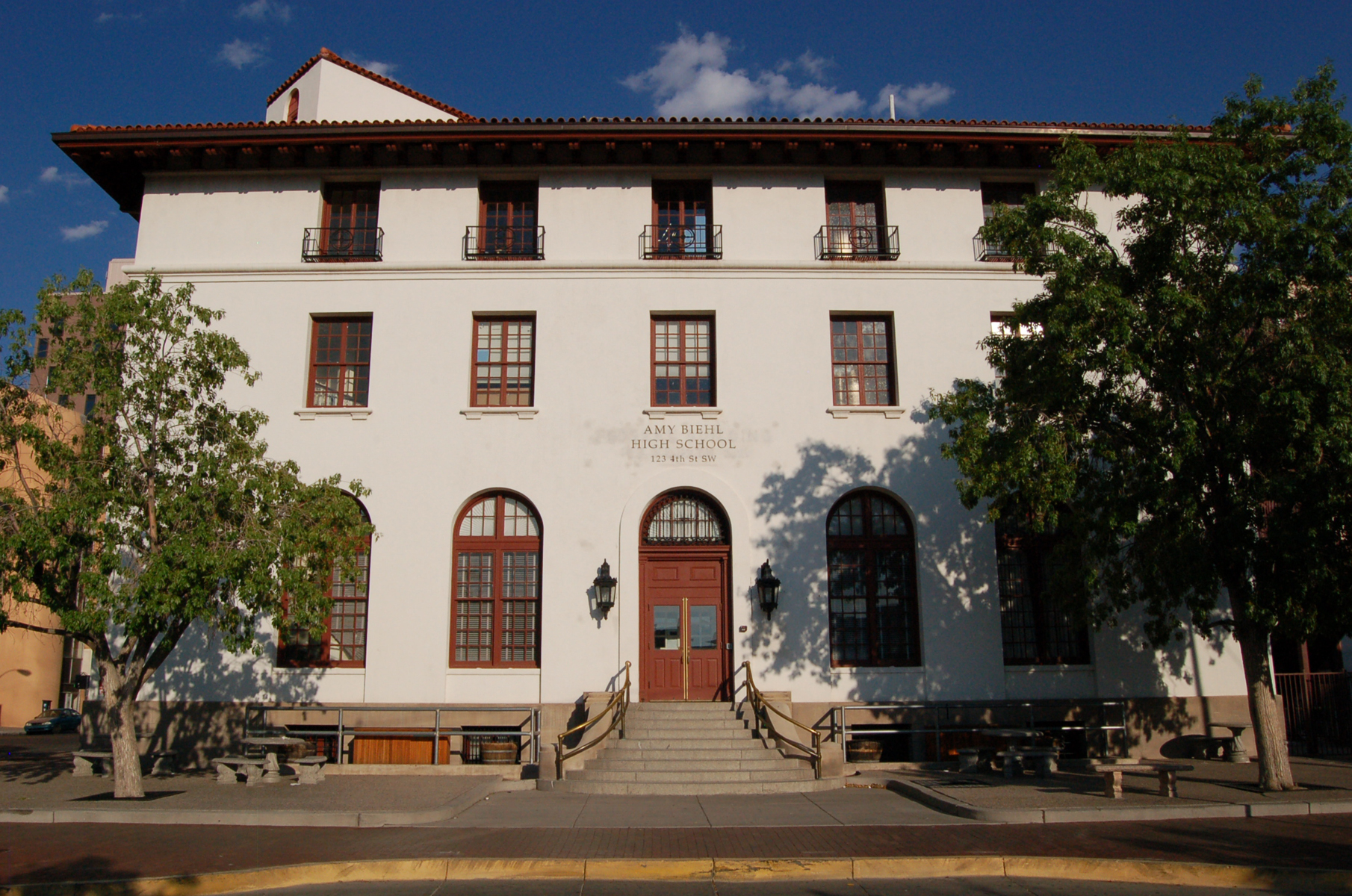
- Amy Biehl High School, 2012

Location
- 123 4th Street SW; Albuquerque, New Mexico 87102; United States

Information
- Type: Charter, Secondary
- Motto: "Courage, Scholarship, Community"
- Established: 2000
- Founder: Teresa Hogan, Tony Monfilleto & Tom Siegel
- School district: Albuquerque Public Schools
- Dean: Mark O'Gawa
- Principal: Frank McCulloch
- Teaching staff: 15.70 (FTE)
- Grades: 9th-12th grade
- Enrollment: 212 (2023–2024)
- Student to teacher ratio: 13.50
- Campus: Urban, Downtown Albuquerque
- Color
- Mascot: Lion
- Nickname: Amy Biehl
- Affiliations: Coalition of Essential Schools
- Website: Amy Biehl High School

Amy Biehl High School is a charter high school (275 students, grades 9–12) in Albuquerque, New Mexico. The school is now housed in the Old Post Office building in Downtown Albuquerque. The school is named after Amy Biehl, an anti-Apartheid activist who was murdered by a black mob in South Africa in 1993.

== Concurrent Enrollment ==
Amy Biehl High School's concurrent enrollment requires students in their senior year to attend two college classes (at UNM or CNM), as well as the school's core academic classes. On Tuesdays and Thursdays after a morning class senior students typically attend concurrent enrollment classes and do senior projects.

== Senior Project ==
The Senior Project is a culminating service-learning project. Students prepare for this experience in a course called "Compass" during the junior year. The goal of the Senior Project is to combine academic learning and service skills to help the community. Students collaborate with mentors in a variety of Albuquerque organizations and agencies, including the National Hispanic Cultural Center, UNM Hospital ICU, Warehouse 508, St. Martin's Hospitality Center, Samaritan Care, Habitat for Humanity, Outcomes, Inc. and many APS classrooms across the city. Students contribute at least 100 hours to these projects and many identify career pathways.

== Related legislation ==
The Albuquerque, New Mexico, Federal Land Conveyance Act of 2014 (H.R. 3998) is a bill that would direct the General Services Administration (GSA) to sell a federal property in downtown Albuquerque, New Mexico, to the Amy Biehl High School Foundation for its fair market value. The high school has been using that federal location as a school building since 2006 and has plans to expand. The GSA decided that it would be better to sell the building than continue to rent it to the school.

== See also ==
- Amy Biehl
- List of high schools in New Mexico
