= Dale Shewalter =

American educator (1950–2010)

Dale Richard Shewalter (May 16, 1950 – January 10, 2010) was an American teacher who founded and promoted the Arizona Trail in 1985.

Shewalter was born in Geneva, Illinois, on May 16, 1950. He served in the United States Marine Corps 1st Battalion, 7th Marines during the Vietnam War. Shewalter worked as a teacher for the Flagstaff Unified School District.

Shewalter, who began his career as a teacher, led the effort to create the Arizona Trail, a hiking, mountain bike (except Wilderness areas) and horseback trail which extends from the Mexico border near Sierra Vista going 807 miles through Arizona's most remote and rugged areas to the Utah border near Kanab. It was designated a National Scenic Trail in 2009 by the U.S. Congress. A plaque stands in Buffalo Park in Flagstaff, Arizona, in recognition of Shewalter's work.

Dale Shewalter died of cancer in Flagstaff, Arizona, on January 10, 2010, at the age of 59. He was survived by his wife, Madeleine Shewalter, son, Zane Shewalter and stepdaughter, Allison Hartman. His funeral was held at the Ashurst Auditorium at Northern Arizona University.

Shewalter's niece was Amy Biehl, who was murdered in South Africa in 1993.
