= Amy Biehl Foundation Trust =

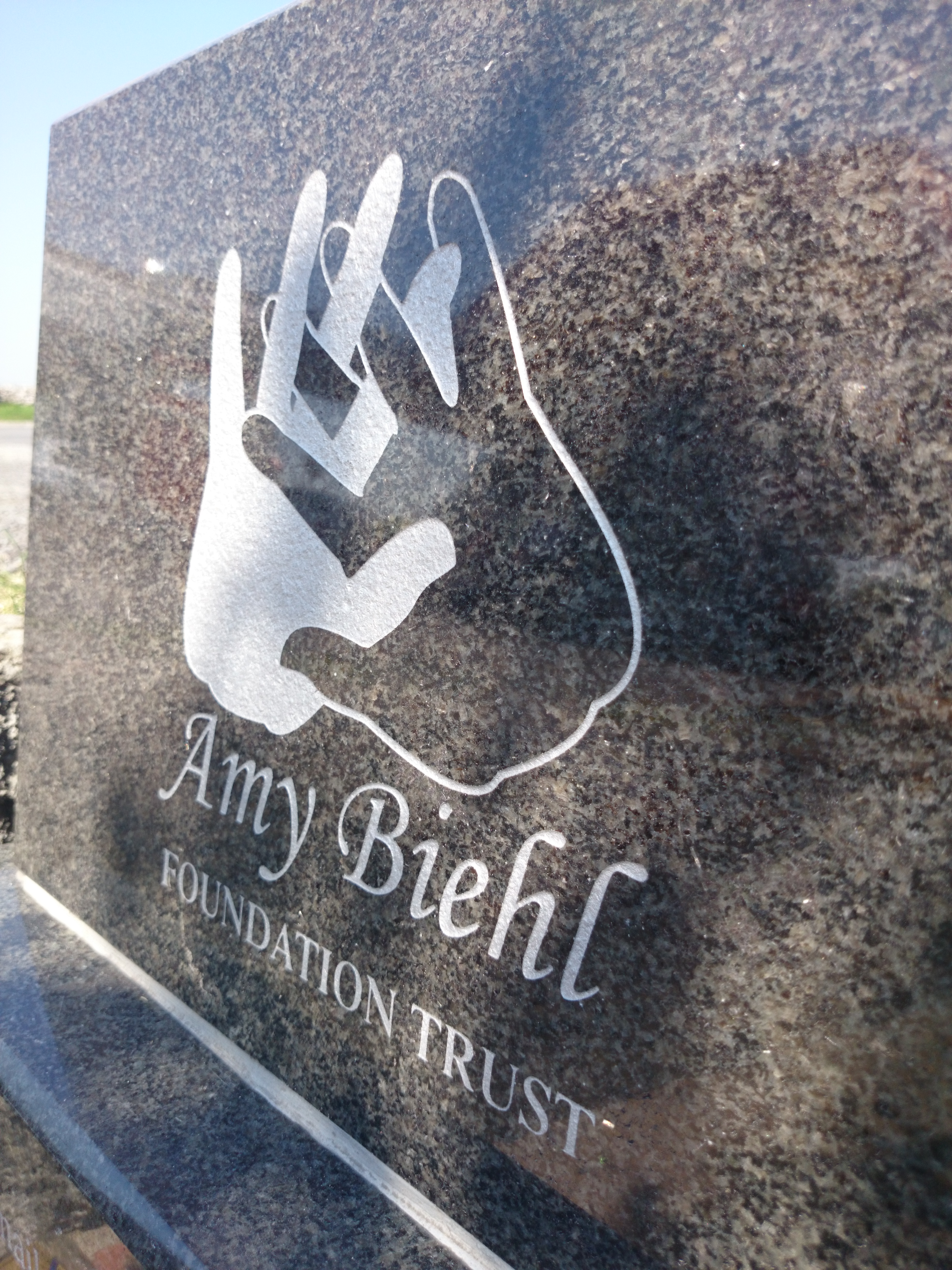
Amy Biehl Foundation Trust monument in Gugulethu

The Amy Biehl Foundation Trust was the organization established in Cape Town, South Africa by Linda and Peter Biehl commemorate their daughter Amy Biehl, a white American anti-apartheid activist who was killed by a black mob during racial violence in South Africa in 1993.

Today two organizations are the successors to the Amy Biehl Foundation Trust.

The Amy Biehl Foundation USA is headed by Linda Biehl and based in the United States.

The Amy Foundation is based in Sybrand Park, Cape Town, South Africa and is headed up by Kevin Chaplin.

The reasons for the split into two organizations include Linda and Peter Biehl's desire for the South African organization to stand on its own as a sustainable organization.

The original foundation strived to fulfil three rights in the South African Constitution: the right to education, the right to equal employment, and the right to health. The foundation's mission statement is "to weave a barrier against violence" and "to prevent youth violence through a holistic approach to community development in socio-economically disadvantaged communities in and around Cape Town." It aimed to do so by empowering the youths of the townships around Cape Town, mainly through after-school programs with activities like music, dance, drama, sports, crafts and HIV/AIDS peer education. These programs were run at several township-schools every afternoon, and in addition the foundation ran weekly activities outside the townships for some of the children, and they also have Saturday and Holiday programs. The foundation initially received funding from USAID as well as private donations.

Linda Biehl, Amy's mother and a founder of the trust, speaks on the promise of restorative justice, and continues the work of the foundation. She was awarded the Order of the Companions of O. R. Tambo (bronze class) in 2008 by South African President Thabo Mbeki.

Two of the four men convicted for Biehl's murder, Easy Nofemela and Ntobeko Peni, have since reconciled with her parents, and Ntobeko Peni still works for the Foundation in South Africa. Easy Nofemela left the Amy Foundation in 2018.
