= Sindiwe Magona =

South African writer (born 1943)

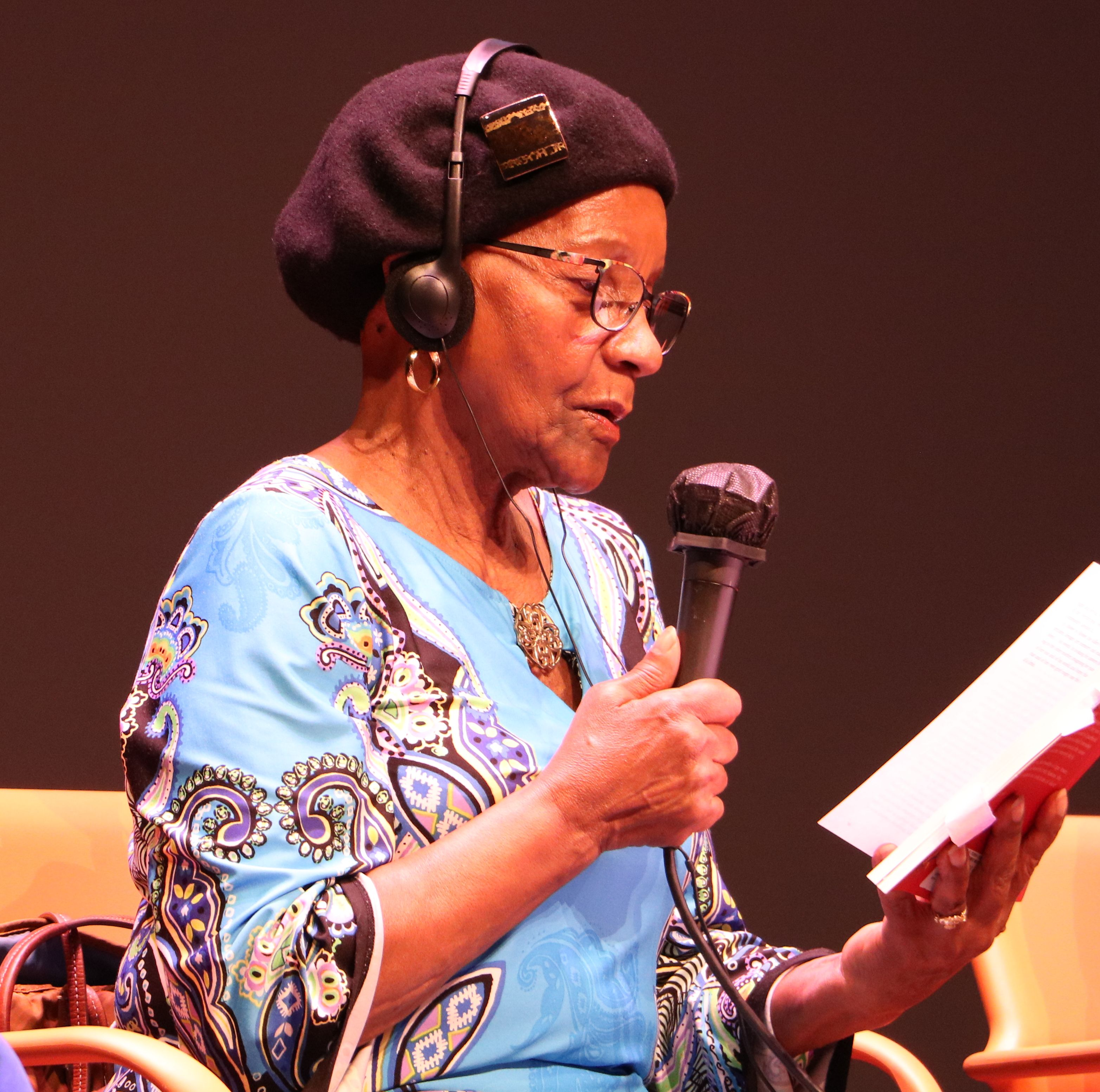
- Magona in 2021
- Born: 27 August 1943 (age 83); Gungululu, Transkei, South Africa
- Education: University of South Africa; Columbia University (M.Sc.)
- Occupations: Author, motivational speaker, teacher, translator, actor
- Website: sindiwemagona.wixsite.com/website

Sindiwe Magona (born 27 August 1943) is a South African writer.

== Early life ==
Magona is a native of the former Transkei region, South Africa. She grew up in Gugulethu, a Cape Town township, and worked as a domestic while completing her secondary education by correspondence. Magona later graduated from the University of South Africa and earned her Master of Science degree in Organisational Social Work from Columbia University.

== Career ==
She starred as Singisa in the isiXhosa classic drama Ityala Lamawele.

She worked in various capacities for the United Nations for more than 20 years, retiring in 2003.

In the 2013 animated adventure comedy film Khumba she was the voice actor for the character Gemsbok Healer.

She is Writer-in-Residence at the University of the Western Cape and has been a visiting professor working at Georgia State University.

=== Author ===
Magona published two autobiographies: To My Children's Children (in 1990) and Forced To Grow (in 1992); two collections of short stories: Living Loving and Lying Awake at Night and Push-Push and Other Stories; and four novels: Mother to Mother, Beauty's Gift, Life is a Hard but Beautiful Thing, and Chasing Tails of My Father's Cattle!

In 1998, Magona published Mother to Mother, a fictionalized account of the Amy Biehl killing, which she adapted into a play. This was performed at the Baxter Theatre complex in late 2009 and the film rights were acquired by Type A Films in 2003. She wrote autobiographies and short story collections. Her novel Beauty's Gift was shortlisted for the 2009 Commonwealth Writers' Prize Best Book, Africa Region. In 2009, Please, Take Photographs, her first collection of poems, was published.

Her other works include Please, take Photographs! a book of poetry (Modjaji Books, 2009) and Awam Ngqo! a book of short stories (NASOU 2009) and prescribed for Grade 8; Twelve Books of Folktales – written in both English and Xhosa; translated into isiZulu; Setswana, Afrikaans; Sesotho; Sepedi; and published in September 2014 – David Philip; Skin We In, in collaboration with scientist Nina Jablonksy and illustrator Lynn Feldman – a book about skin colour and race.

Magona's children's books include The Best Meal Ever and Life is a hard but beautiful thing: English, Afrikaans. She created the first series for children in isiXhosa: Sigalelekile: 48 books (Via Afrika). She contributed more than twenty books in another series, Siyakhula (Oxford University Press).

Compilation: You Pay For The View – Maskew Miller Longman (2009)

With the Gugulethu Writers' Group, Magona created Umthi ngamnye unentlaka yawo – short stories (Xhosa Realities, 2007); UNobanzi (Oxford University Press, 2010); UNyana weSizwe 2009 and 2010; and a series of 24 books (Igugu), from her workshop with students at the University of the Western Cape (David Philip Publishers, 2015). Two books of poetry, UWC students, will be published in isiXhosa.

== Works ==
- 1990 : To My Children's Children
- 1991 : Living, Loving and Lying Awake at Night
- 1992 : Forced to Grow
- 1996 : Push Push
- 1998 : Mother to Mother
- 2006 : The Best Meal Ever!
- 2008 : Beauty's Gift
- 2009 : Please, Take Photographs
- 2014 : The Woman on the Moon
- 2016 : Chasing The Tails of My Father's Castle
- 2016 : Books and Bricks
- 2016 : Vukani
- 2016 : The Ugly Duckling
- 2016 : From Robben Island to Bishopscourt
- 2016 : Clicking with Xhosa: A Xhosa Phrasebook

== Recognition ==
- Grinzane Award (2007) for writing that addresses social concerns
- Molteno Gold Medal (2007) for promoting Xhosa culture and language
- Lifetime Achievement Award (2007) for her contribution to South African literature
- Order of iKhamanga in bronze (2011) Presidential Award and the highest such award in South Africa
- Mbokodo Award (2012), joint winner with Nadine Gordimer
