= Nobulumko Nkondlo =

South African politician

Nobulumko Nkondlo MPP
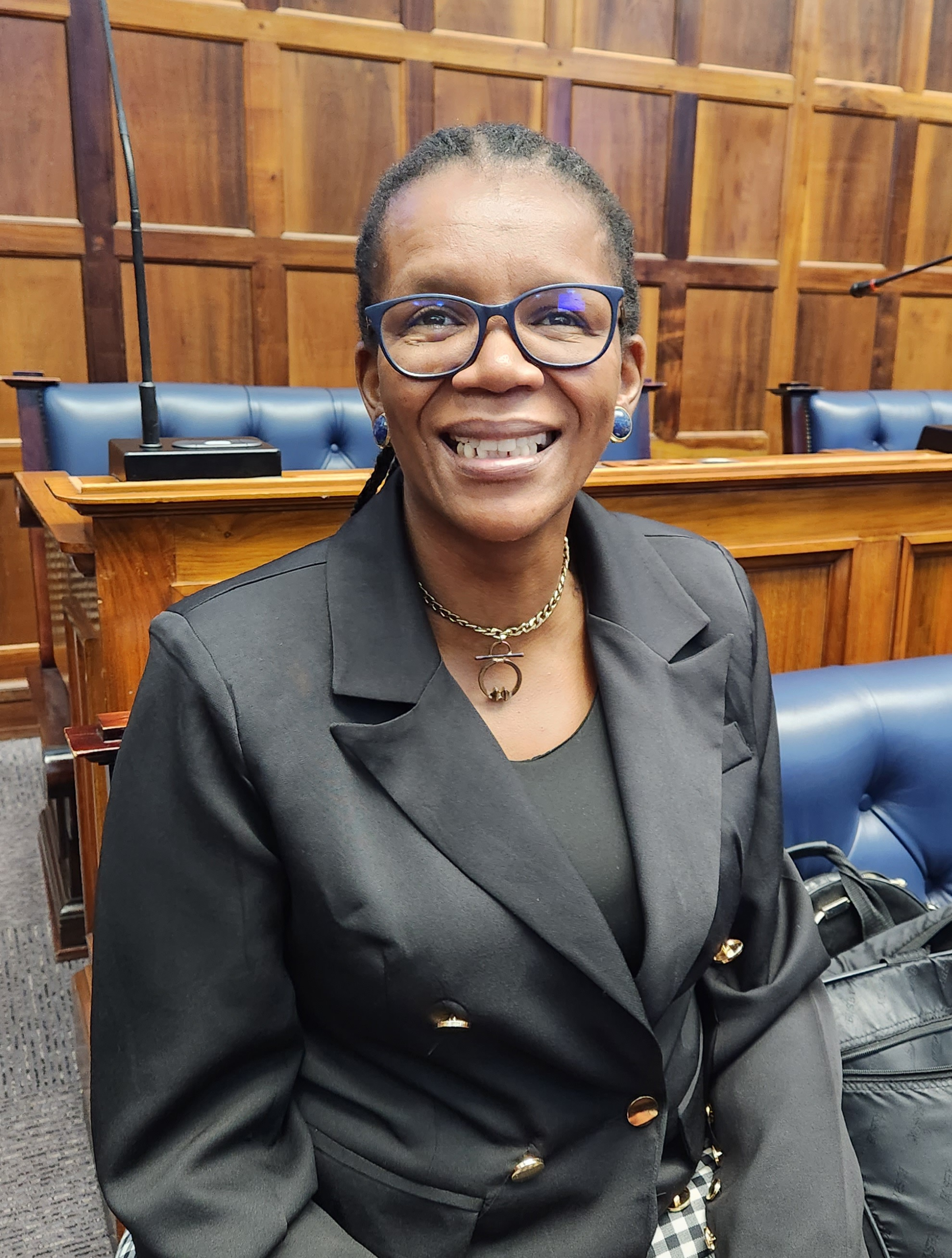

Member of the Western Cape Provincial Parliament
- Incumbent
- Assumed office 9 November 2016

Personal details
- Born: Nobulumko Degracia Nkondlo
- Party: African National Congress
- Occupation: Member of the Provincial Parliament
- Profession: Politician

Nobulumko Degracia Nkondlo is a South African African National Congress politician who has served as a Member of the Western Cape Provincial Parliament since November 2016. She succeeded former ANC provincial leader Marius Fransman.

== Background ==
Born in Gugulethu, Cape Town, she completed matric at the Gugulethu Comprehensive High School. Her mother worked as a domestic worker. Nkondlo has qualifications in public and project management. She also has one daughter.

== Politics career ==
Nkondlo is a member of the African National Congress. She was elected the provincial chairperson of the party's youth league in 2004 and served in the position until 2006. Between 2006 and 2009, she served as the chairperson of the National Youth Commission. Nkondlo was the commission's first female chairperson.

Prior to her swearing-in as a Member of the Western Cape Provincial Parliament, she worked as the director of transformation and youth in the National Public Enterprises Department. On 9 November 2016, she was sworn in as an MPP. She succeeded Marius Fransman, who had resigned after he was accused of sexual harassment by his personal assistant. Nkondlo was elected to a full term as a provincial parliamentarian in May 2019. She was re-elected as an MPP at the 2024 general election.
