= Linda Biehl =

American activist and scholar

- Born: 1943 (age 82–83); Chicago, Illinois, United States
- Occupation: Philanthropist
- Spouse: Peter Biehl
- Children: 4

Linda Biehl (born 1943) is an American philanthropist and mother of Amy Biehl, an activist who was murdered in 1993 in South Africa. She is the co-founder and director of the United States-based Amy Biehl Foundation (with husband Peter Biehl) and the South African-based Amy Biehl Foundation Trust.

== Early life ==
Biehl was born in 1943 in Chicago. She met her late husband Peter at Whittier College in California, and they had four children together. Before the death of her daughter Amy, she ran an American Indian art gallery in Santa Fe, New Mexico.

== Philanthropy ==
After the 1993 death of her daughter Amy in South Africa, the Biehls supported the amnesty appeal, to South Africa's Truth and Reconciliation Commission, by those convicted of Amy's murder. After a tour of the Cape Town townships, the couple started developing projects to continue their daughter's work. They followed in 1994 by creating the Amy Biehl Foundation. Linda continued her work after Peter died from colon cancer in 2002.

In 1999, Linda and Peter Biehl were awarded the Aline and Norman Felton Humanitarian Award. In 2008, Biehl was awarded the Order of the Companions of O. R. Tambo in Bronze in South Africa, an award from the President. The same year, she was announced as the first Greely Scholar at University of Massachusetts Lowell.

In 2016 Biehl was hired as a consultant with Tyler Perry's Atlanta-based production company to work on a movie about Amy's life and the relationship the family has with the two men convicted of her murder. The movie, The Year of the Great Storm, was still in production as of January 2019.
