= Arizona Trail =

US National Scenic Trail

Coordinates: 35°57′28″N 111°57′17″W

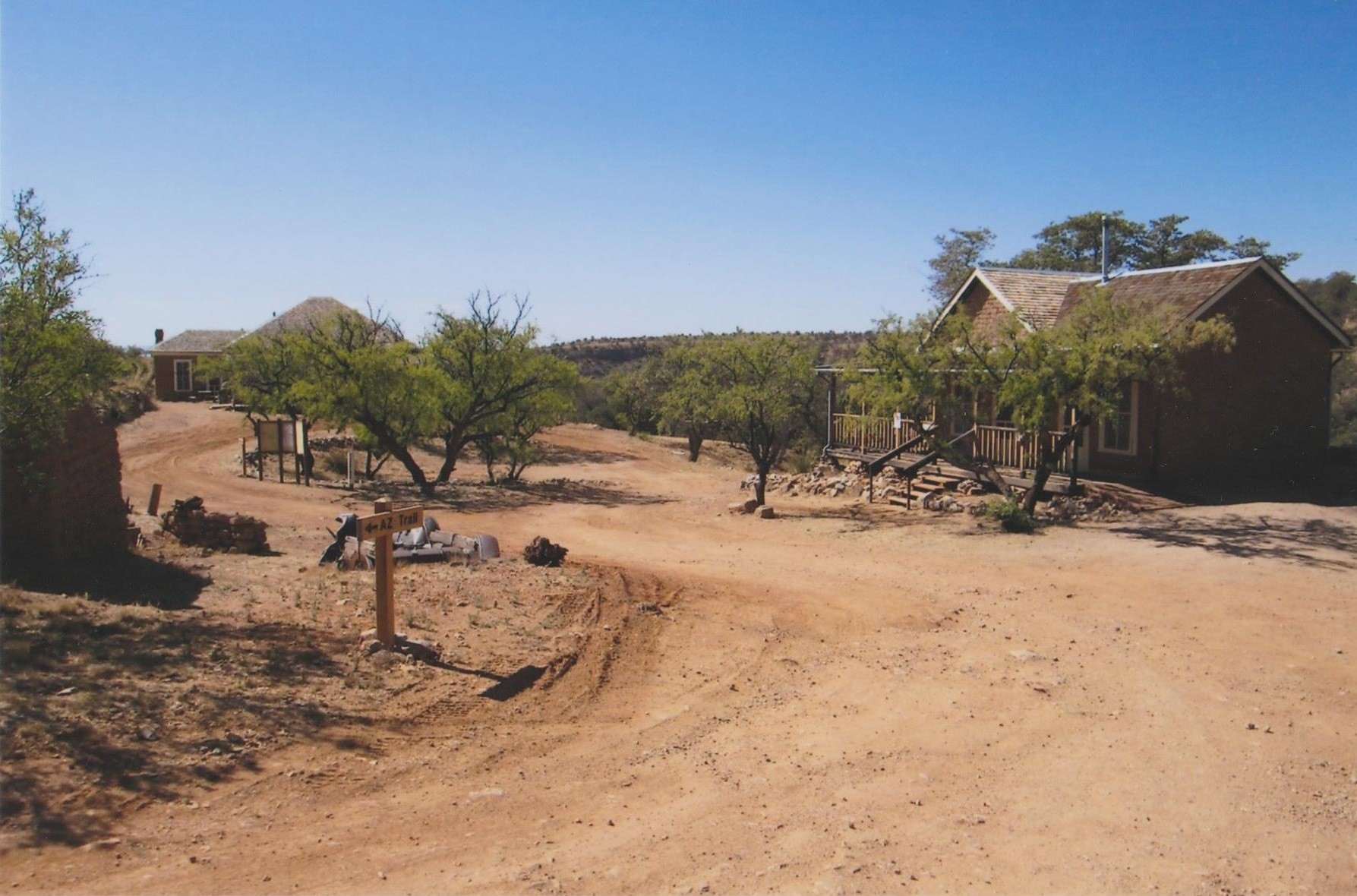
- Left: The Arizona Trail logo. Right: Kentucky Camp, along the Arizona Trail in the Santa Rita Mountains.
- Length: 800 mi (1,300 km)
- Location: Arizona, United States
- Designation: National Scenic Trail
- Trailheads: Coronado National Memorial; Arizona–Utah border
- Use: Hiking, horseback riding, mountain biking, cross-country skiing
- Highest point: San Francisco Peaks (This point is on a proposed section of the trail), 9,600 ft (2,900 m)
- Lowest point: Gila River, 1,700 ft (520 m)
- Difficulty: Easy to Strenuous
- Season: Year-round at lower elevations, Summer and Fall at higher elevations
- Sights: Santa Catalina Mountains, Mogollon Rim, San Francisco Peaks, Grand Canyon

The Arizona National Scenic Trail (AZT) is a National Scenic Trail from Mexico to Utah that traverses the whole north–south length of the U.S. state of Arizona. The trail begins at the Coronado National Memorial near the US–Mexico border and moves north through parts of the Huachuca, Santa Rita, and Rincon Mountains. The trail continues through the Santa Catalina north of Tucson and the Mazatzal Mountains before ascending the Mogollon Rim north of Payson, and eventually leading to the higher elevations of Northern Arizona and the San Francisco Peaks. The trail then continues across the Coconino Plateau and in and out of the Grand Canyon. The Arizona Trail terminates near the Arizona–Utah border in the Kaibab Plateau region. The 800-mile (1,300 km) long Arizona Trail was completed on December 16, 2011. The trail is designed as a primitive trail for hiking, equestrians, mountain biking, and even cross country skiing, showcasing the wide variety of mountain ranges and ecosystems of Arizona.

The idea for the trail was originally developed and promoted in 1985 by Dale Shewalter, a Flagstaff, Arizona, teacher. The Arizona Trail was designated as a National Scenic Trail on March 30, 2009, by the Omnibus Public Land Management Act of 2009. It forms part of the shortened version of the 6,875-mile (11,064 km) Great Western Loop. This version includes the Grand Canyon National Park.

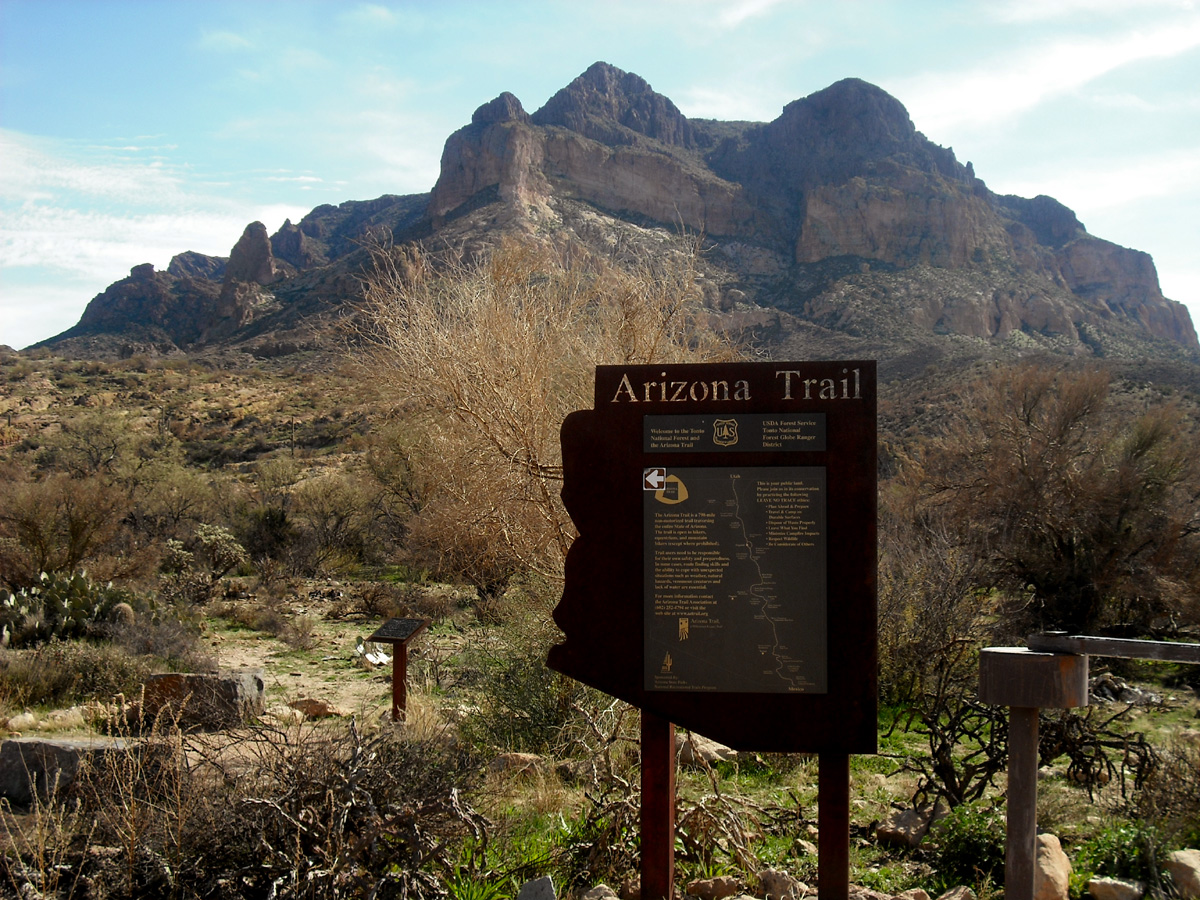
Sign for the Arizona Trail as it passes near Picketpost Mountain (background) in Superior, Arizona.

== History ==
The Arizona Trail was created by interconnecting preexisting trails. In 1994, the Arizona Trail Association incorporated as a 501(c)(3) non-profit organization to bring volunteers and the necessary resources to create maps, identify water sources, build and maintain the trail, and help raise funds for the trail.

== Hiking ==
=== Map of the trail ===
The Arizona Trail is divided into 43 passages, and categorized into Southern, Central, and Northern sections.

A 21-mile section (34 km) along the Arizona Trail provides views in the Grand Canyon region, particularly on the Kaibab Plateau. The trail connects the East Rim View and Murray trailheads.

=== Trail finishers ===
Trail finishers are individuals who have reported completing the Arizona Trail. In 2021, the ATA reported 400 hikers finished the trail that year. Finishers receive a copper belt buckle (or pin/pendant) in celebration of their accomplishment. This list includes:

- Thru-hikers and segment hikers
- Speed record ultra runners
- Yo-yo's (those who do the trail in one direction, then turn around and do it in the other direction)
- Horseback riders
- Mountain bikers
- Those who used a variety of non-motorized modes to travel along every portion of the Arizona Trail
- Some pioneers who trekked overland long before the AZT was completely built.

=== Trail communities ===
The “AZT Gateway” provides community information (i.e., lodging, staple stores, access information, urgent care, etc.). There are many scenic communities that have areas of interest along the Arizona Trail.

=== Mountain biking ===
Mountain biking is allowed but segments are off-limits due to wilderness restrictions. Preferred biking routes have been developed to retain a trail experience consistent with National Scenic Trail values.

=== Animals ===
The rough terrain, venomous snakes, sharp vegetation, hot ground during the summer, and lack of water in many trail segments can make the Arizona Trail unsuitable for most dogs, and in some sections, they are not allowed. Hikers wanting to bring their dogs should check with the Arizona Trail Association, which recommends that dog owners plan day trips in areas where dogs are allowed and when conditions (particularly heat and water) are suitable for them.

Pack goats are sometimes used as companions on the trail. They are allowed on some parts of the Arizona Trail, but prohibited on other segments due to the possibility of diseases from domestic goats spreading to bighorn sheep populations. Pack goats are not allowed anywhere bighorn sheep live. It's not possible to do a thru-hike with pack goats.

== Maintenance and Management ==
The maintenance of the Arizona Trail is coordinated by the Arizona Trail Association (ATA) in partnership with federal and state land management agencies. The trail's management structure relies significantly on the Trail Steward Program, which divides the 800-mile corridor into 43 distinct passages. Each passage is assigned to an individual or organizational "Segment Steward" who commits to a multi-year term (typically three years) to monitor trail conditions and oversee basic upkeep.

The program serves as the primary labor force for the trail's preservation. According to the ATA's 2025 Annual Report, 2,029 volunteers contributed more than 26,000 hours of service, a contribution valued at approximately $906,314. These volunteer efforts include routine tread repair, wayfinding improvements, and specialized tasks such as sawyer work to clear obstructions. Certified sawyers cleared over 250 downed trees across the trail in 2025. In addition to volunteer-led maintenance, the ATA manages larger-scale restoration and capital improvement projects using professional trail crews and contracted conservation corps.
