= Murder of Anni Dewani =

Indian-Swedish engineer murdered in South Africa

Anni Dewani
- Born: Anni Ninna Hindocha; 12 March 1982; Mariestad, Sweden
- Disappeared: 13 November 2010 (aged 28); Gugulethu, South Africa; 33°58′42″S 18°34′26″E
- Cause of death: Gunshot to chest and neck
- Body discovered: Lingelethu West, City of Cape Town, South Africa; 34°03′01″S 18°39′23″E
- Occupation: Engineer
- Spouse: Shrien Dewani

Anni Ninna Dewani (née Hindocha; 12 March 1982 – 13 November 2010) was a Swedish woman of Indian origin who was murdered while on her honeymoon in South Africa after the taxi in which she and her husband Shrien Dewani were traveling was hijacked.

Three arrests were made in the days following the crime; hijackers Mziwamadoda Qwabe and Xolile Mngeni, and hotel receptionist Monde Mbolombo admitted to their involvement in an unintentionally fatal robbery and kidnapping. Facing life in prison, Qwabe and Mbolombo later changed their stories to allege the crime had been a premeditated murder for hire at the behest of Anni's husband Shrien Dewani. Taxi driver Zola Tongo initially claimed to be an innocent victim of the incident, but faced with the weight of evidence implicating him in the crime and in the wake of his fellow conspirators' allegations of a "murder for hire" plot, he too changed his story to allege the husband was the instigator. Plea bargains were offered to the conspirators in exchange for future testimony in legal proceedings related to the crime. The allegation of the husband's involvement made global headlines; Shrien Dewani's supporters denied the accusations, saying it was "ludicrous" to suggest he had solicited an attack on his wife from the first taxi driver he met within hours of their arrival in Cape Town.

Zola Tongo pleaded guilty to murder in December 2010 and was sentenced to 18 years in prison. Mziwamadoda Qwabe pleaded guilty to murder in August 2012 and was sentenced to 25 years in prison. Xolile Mngeni was tried and convicted of murder in November 2012 and was sentenced to life in prison. Monde Mbolombo admitted his involvement but was offered immunity in exchange for testimony against the other men alleged to have been involved in the crime.

South African prosecutors formulated charges against Shrien Dewani based on the later-discredited confessions of Tongo, Qwabe and Mbolombo, who were found to have committed perjury. Charges were brought on the basis Anni had been the victim of a premeditated kidnapping and murder for hire that was staged to appear like a random carjacking, allegedly arranged by her husband. Following a long legal battle, Shrien was extradited from the UK to South Africa to face trial. He was acquitted by a Western Cape High Court in December 2014.

== Background ==
=== Anni Dewani ===
The Hindocha family was forced to leave Uganda in the early 1970s after the country's president, Idi Amin, expelled all Asians living there. They were granted residence in Sweden and settled in Mariestad, where their daughter Anni was born and raised.

=== Wedding ===
Anni Hindocha met Shrien Dewani in London in 2009; they maintained a long-distance relationship until Hindocha moved to the UK in March 2010, where they became engaged in May that year. The couple, whose relationship was sometimes troubled, married at Lake Powai near Mumbai, India, on 29 October 2010. They were planning to hold a civil ceremony in the UK in 2011 for friends who could not attend their wedding in India.

== Robbery, kidnapping and murder ==
After landing at Cape Town International Airport on 7 November 2010, Dewani and her husband took a domestic flight and stayed at the Kruger National Park for four nights. On 12 November, the couple returned to Cape Town International Airport, where they met and engaged taxi driver Zola Tongo to drive them to the five-star Cape Grace Hotel.

On 13 November, having retained Tongo as a tour guide, the couple was driven through the city in his Volkswagen Sharan into Gugulethu. Tongo drove to Surfside Restaurant in the Strand suburb, where the couple dined. After their meal, Tongo drove the Dewanis back into Gugulethu. Shortly after they had turned off the main road, two armed men hijacked the vehicle. After driving a short distance, Tongo was ejected from the taxi. Shrien Dewani was robbed of his money, wallet, designer watch and mobile telephone, and after being driven for about 20 minutes, he was also ejected from the vehicle. On the street, a bystander assisted him by calling the police.

At 07:50 on 14 November, in Lingelethu West, Anni Dewani was found dead in the back of the VW Sharan taxi. She had suffered a single gunshot wound to her neck. Police later confirmed Anni's Giorgio Armani wristwatch, a white-gold and diamond bracelet, her handbag and her BlackBerry mobile telephone were missing, and assumed they were stolen. The items stolen in the robbery had an estimated value of South African rand R90,000 (USD 6089).

== Post-mortem examination, repatriation and cremation ==
The post-mortem examination revealed bruising on her inner leg, indicating she had been involved in a struggle. It also indicated she had died from a single gunshot that passed through her hand and neck, severing an artery. There was no sign of sexual assault. On 17 November, Dewani's body was released by the South African authorities and returned to the United Kingdom on a British Airways flight, accompanied by her husband. Six months after her death, following Hindu customs, her family scattered her ashes in her favourite area of the Vänern lake, close to her home town, Mariestad, Sweden.

== Investigation: sequence of arrests and confessions ==
As a result of a palm print found on the abandoned taxi, Xolile Mngeni was arrested on Tuesday 16 November 2010. Mngeni made a videotaped confession in the presence of Captain Jonker of the South African Police Service, admitting involvement in a hijack, armed robbery and kidnapping operation. He described Shrien and Anni Dewani as victims and said Qwabe shot Anni Dewani during a struggle for her handbag.

Mziwamadoda Qwabe was arrested at around 01:00 on Thursday 18 November 2010 as a result of a tip-off from a trusted township informant. After initial denials, Qwabe was allowed to consult with arrested co-conspirators Mbolombo and Mngeni, and subsequently admitted involvement in the hijack, armed robbery and kidnapping. He described Shrien and Anni Dewani as victims. He changed his story during an interview recorded at 17:21 that day, saying the incident was a murder planned at the behest of Shrien Dewani.

Monde Mbolombo was arrested in the early hours of Thursday 18 November 2010 as a result of Qwabe providing his name to the police. After initially denying involvement, Mbolombo made a recorded confession at 16:30, admitting arranging a hijacking and armed robbery operation. The confession did not mention a planned murder or Shrien Dewani's involvement. The following day, Mbolombo changed his story, saying the operation was a planned murder at the behest of Shrien Dewani.

Taxi driver Zola Tongo reported the hijacking to a police station in Gugulethu after he was ejected from the vehicle, and made a statement saying he was an unknowing victim. On 17 November, Tongo gave a statement to Officer Hendrikse of the SAPS, again saying he was an innocent victim. The following day, Tongo appointed attorney William De Grass, and on Saturday 20 November he surrendered to police and said the operation was a planned murder that was staged to appear as a random hijacking at the behest of Shrien Dewani.

== Media coverage ==
In South Africa, there was much media coverage of the case following the discovery of the body. With an economy reliant on tourism, tour operators reported an immediate drop in bookings as potential visitors became aware of the country's murder rate; on average, 46 per day. There were also concerns the killing would negate the goodwill resulting from the 2010 FIFA World Cup. The assignment of the Police Hawks team, and the early arrests, conviction and statement implicating Shrien Dewani led to increased media coverage.

=== BBC Panorama episode ===
An episode of the BBC television documentary series Panorama in March 2012 reported that the original South African post-mortem report showed the bullet that killed Anni Dewani had passed through her left hand followed by her chest, and that the wound on her neck was an exit wound. The report said the bullet left "an irregular gunshot exit wound", which suggested there had been a struggle. A second Panorama programme broadcast in September 2013 revisited the case and highlighted numerous inconsistencies between the physical evidence, witness testimony, and the South African prosecutors' purported version of events. In particular, it said the forensic evidence had not been collected properly and that it indicated an accidental shooting during a struggle rather than a deliberate killing.

=== Anni: The Honeymoon Murder ===
A four part documentary on Anni Dewani's murder was released for streaming in 2021 and television in 2022 by the Discovery channel. Producers of this crime documentary series used testimony and CCTV footage from the South African police (SAPS), Cape Grace Hotel, investigating officers, interviews with legal teams, the Hindocha family and the hotel receptionist who received immunity from prosecution and became a state witness, Monde Mbolombo.

== Trials, convictions and sentencing ==
=== Plea bargains ===
Mziwamadoda Qwabe and Zola Tongo were offered reduced sentences in exchange for guilty pleas and the promise of truthful testimony against Shrien Dewani and in other criminal proceedings related to the crime. These plea deals were granted in accordance with Section 105A of the Criminal Procedure Act. Monde Mbolombo was granted full immunity from prosecution in exchange for his promise of truthful testimony against Shrien Dewani and in other criminal proceedings related to the crime. This plea deal was granted in accordance with Section 204 of the Criminal Procedure Act.

=== Conviction and sentencing of Zola Tongo ===
On 7 December 2010, Zola Tongo appeared in the Western Cape High Court; in accordance with his plea deal under Section 105A of the Criminal Procedure Act, he pleaded guilty to the armed robbery, kidnapping and murder of Anni Dewani — crimes he alleged were committed at the behest of Shrien Dewani. According to the terms of his Section 105A agreement, Tongo was sentenced to 18 years in prison, contingent on his testifying truthfully against Dewani in any future legal proceedings.

Tongo was expected to give evidence in the trials of Mngeni and Qwabe in 2011 and 2012. Qwabe avoided trial by pleading guilty pursuant to a Section 105A plea deal. Tongo was not called as a witness at Mngeni's trial in 2012.

As of August 2020, Tongo was still serving his 18-year sentence in Malmesbury Prison.

=== Conviction and sentencing of Mziwamadoda Qwabe ===
In pre-trial hearings on 18 February at Wynberg Magistrates Court, counsel for Mziwamadoda Qwabe said the court was unable to provide a fair trial for his client. Thabo Nogemane said, "I am instructed that some unknown police officer assaulted him by means of a big torch. He was hit all over his body. He said the statement was a suggestion put to him by the police. They already had the allegations so they told him: 'Just sign here'. I wouldn't refer to it as a confession, just a statement." According to the terms of his Section 105A agreement, Qwabe was sentenced to 25 years in prison, contingent on his testifying truthfully in future legal proceedings relating to the case. Qwabe will be eligible for release in 2027.

=== Trial of Xolile Mngeni and surrounding events ===
In 2011, Mngeni's lawyer Vusi Tshabalala said his client had been suffocated with a plastic bag before signing a statement admitting his involvement in the killing, further saying police resorted to "irregular methods" because of the pressure they were under to solve the high-profile case. The start of Mngeni's trial was delayed, and on 13 June 2011 it was announced he had undergone brain surgery to remove a tumour.

Despite having admitted to his role in the robbery and kidnapping of Anni Dewani in a videotaped confession, Mngeni pleaded not guilty at the start of his 2012 trial, saying he had an alibi and was not at the scene of the crime. Mngeni's lawyers said his initial confession should be ruled inadmissible as evidence because it was allegedly extracted using torture. Justice Robert Henney ruled against Mngeni and said the confession was admissible. Before testifying in the Mngeni trial, key witness Monde Mbolombo read out a prepared statement confessing to lying in his two previous affidavits and promised to tell the truth when testifying.

On 19 November 2012, Mngeni was convicted of murder and sentenced to life in jail. The court accepted Mziwamadoda Qwabe's and Monde Mbolombo's version of events, according to which the crime was a contract killing. Mngeni was ruled to have been the person who shot Anni Dewani. The court's findings were superseded by the judgement in the later trial of Shrien Dewani, in which the court found the earlier determinations had been made on the basis of flawed forensic evidence, and perjury of Qwabe and Mbolombo, the two key witnesses.

In July 2014, it was confirmed that a medical parole application had been made for Mngeni, who was terminally ill with a brain tumour. He was denied parole and died in jail at the Goodwood Centre of Excellence on 18 October 2014.

=== Extradition and trial of Shrien Dewani ===
After a long legal battle, Shrien Dewani was extradited from the United Kingdom to South Africa on 7 April 2014. Upon arrival he was arrested, charged and ordered to stand trial for allegedly arranging the murder of his wife. He was charged with five offences; conspiracy to commit kidnapping, robbery with aggravating circumstances, murder, kidnapping and obstructing the administration of justice. He pleaded not guilty to all five charges.

Dewani's trial began on 6 October 2014. Under cross examination, the key witnesses who alleged Dewani's involvement—Zola Tongo, Mziwamadoda Qwabe and Monde Mbolombo—contradicted their previous statements and each other on most of the key elements of the "murder for hire" story. Tongo and Mbolombo were found to have fabricated telephone calls and text messages that did not exist and refused to identify a fifth conspirator referred to in taped recordings. Qwabe refused to explain to the court why Anni was driven into a residential area.

On 24 November 2014, after the close of the prosecution's case, Dewani's counsel argued for the case to be dismissed under Section 174 of the Criminal Procedure Act, citing a lack of credible evidence linking his client to the crime. On 8 December, the application for dismissal under Section 174 was granted by the Honourable Judge Traverso; Dewani was acquitted and exonerated of all involvement with the crimes. In her judgement, Traverso ruled there was no credible evidence linking Shrien Dewani to the crime and explained her ruling by saying:

Mr. Tongo, who was the only witness who could link the accused to this conspiracy, gave evidence to the court which is so improbable and contains so many mistakes, lies and inconsistencies that one simply cannot know where the lies end and the truth begins. I accept that at this stage of the proceedings the credibility of a witness plays a limited role. But, in my view, the evidence of these witnesses is so replete with fundamental contradictions on the key components of the State case that I can all but ignore it. In making this finding, I take into account that all three witnesses, Mr. Tongo, Mr. Mbolombo and Mr. Qwabe are intelligent people, and therefore more than capable of attempting to twist their version to implicate the accused.

The court overturned the finding of Justice Henney in the Mngeni trial, ruling that Xolile Mngeni could not have been the person who shot Anni, and that some of the key conclusions reached in the 2012 Mngeni trial were erroneous, being based on flawed forensic evidence and the admitted lies of Monde Mbolombo. The court also ruled that Monde Mbolombo had again committed perjury and would not be granted indemnity from prosecution. Judge Traverso said, "Before Mr. Mbolombo proceeded with his evidence, he delivered a pre-prepared speech which, from the record, appears to be virtually identical to a similarly emotive speech which he gave the court in the Mngeni trial, before blatantly lying about material aspects."

=== Monde Mbolombo ===
Monde Mbolombo has not been prosecuted or punished for his self-confessed role in the crime, nor for his self-confessed perjury whilst testifying. On 19 November 2015 the Director of Public Prosecutions decided Mbolombo could not be prosecuted.

== Complaint about judicial conduct ==
On 22 January 2015, a complaint was lodged by the Higher Education Transformation Network (HETN), alleging judicial bias and prejudiced behaviour of Judge Traverso in the trial of Shrien Dewani. On 25 April that year, a Judicial Conduct Committee dismissed the HETN's complaint, describing it as "frivolous" and lacking in substance. The National Prosecuting Authority declined to appeal the judgement or lodge any complaint against Judge Traverso.

== Coroner's inquest ==
After Shrien Dewani's exoneration in December 2014, Anni Dewani's family asked for a coroner's court in the UK to reopen the inquest into her death and to compel Dewani to publicly answer questions. On 9 September 2015, at Brent Coroner's Court in North London, Coroner Andrew Walker said he did not consider a full inquest appropriate because a criminal trial had been conducted in South Africa. On 9 October, Walker confirmed there was insufficient cause to resume an inquest. He told the court he was prohibited from reaching a conclusion that was inconsistent with the findings of the South African courts.

== Hindocha family statement ==
On 4 August 2018, Anni Hindocha's uncle, acting as spokesperson for the Hindocha family in response to media reports of Shrien Dewani's same-sex relationship, said: "We accept he did not murder Anni, but he lied to us and had a very secret gay life. He owes us an apology for his lies".

== See also ==
- List of solved missing person cases (post-2000)
