= Gugulethu =

Suburb of Cape Town, in Western Cape, South Africa

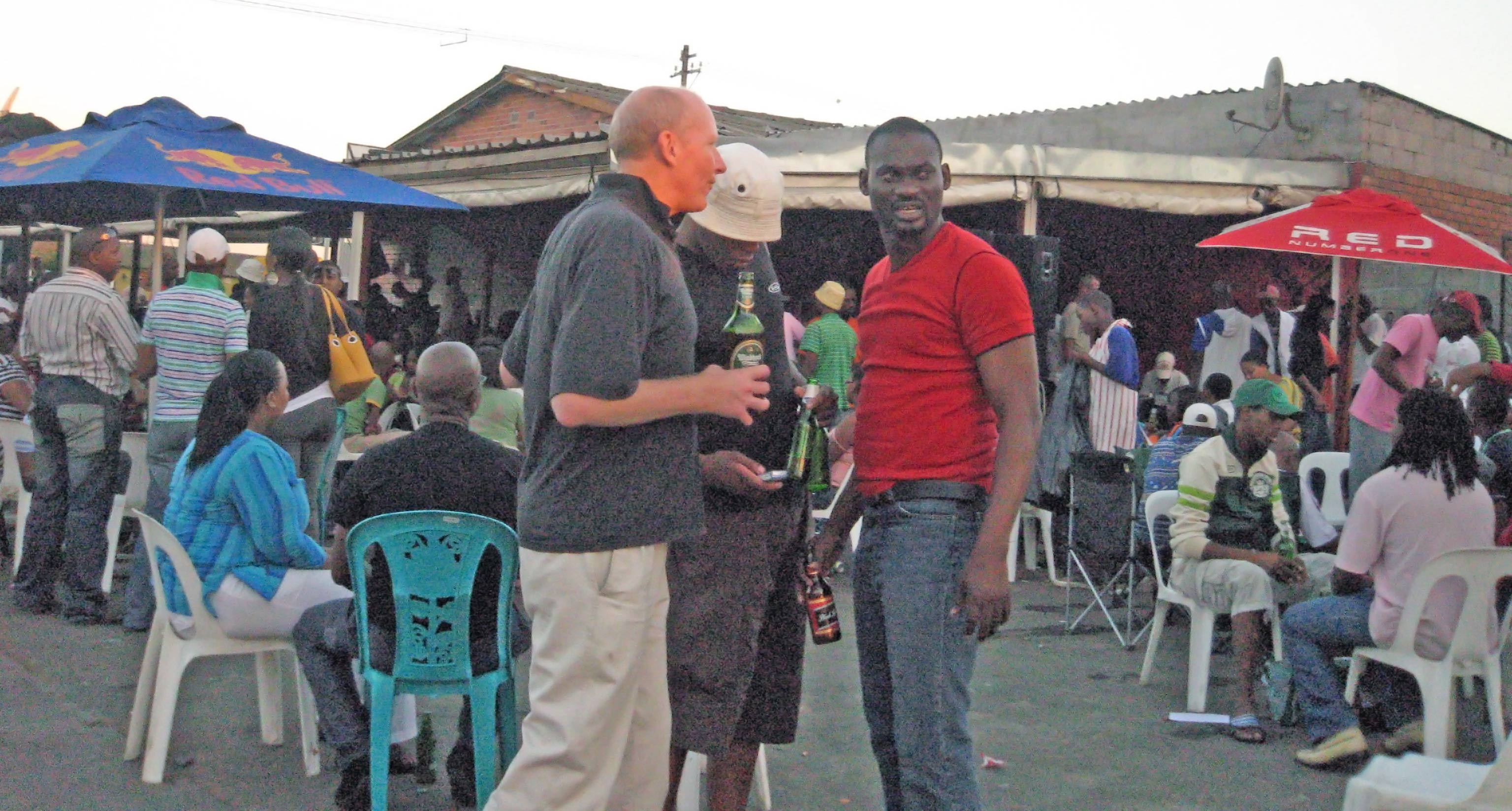
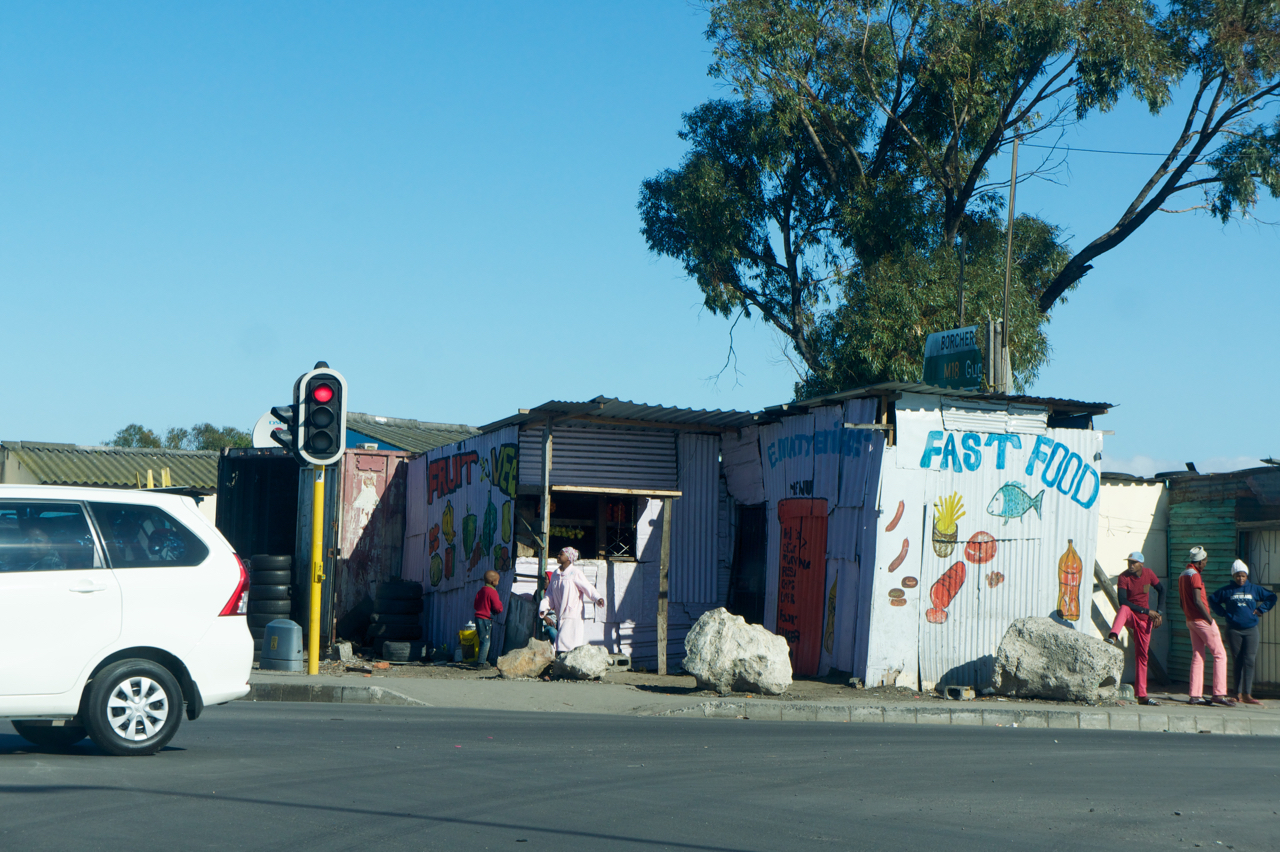
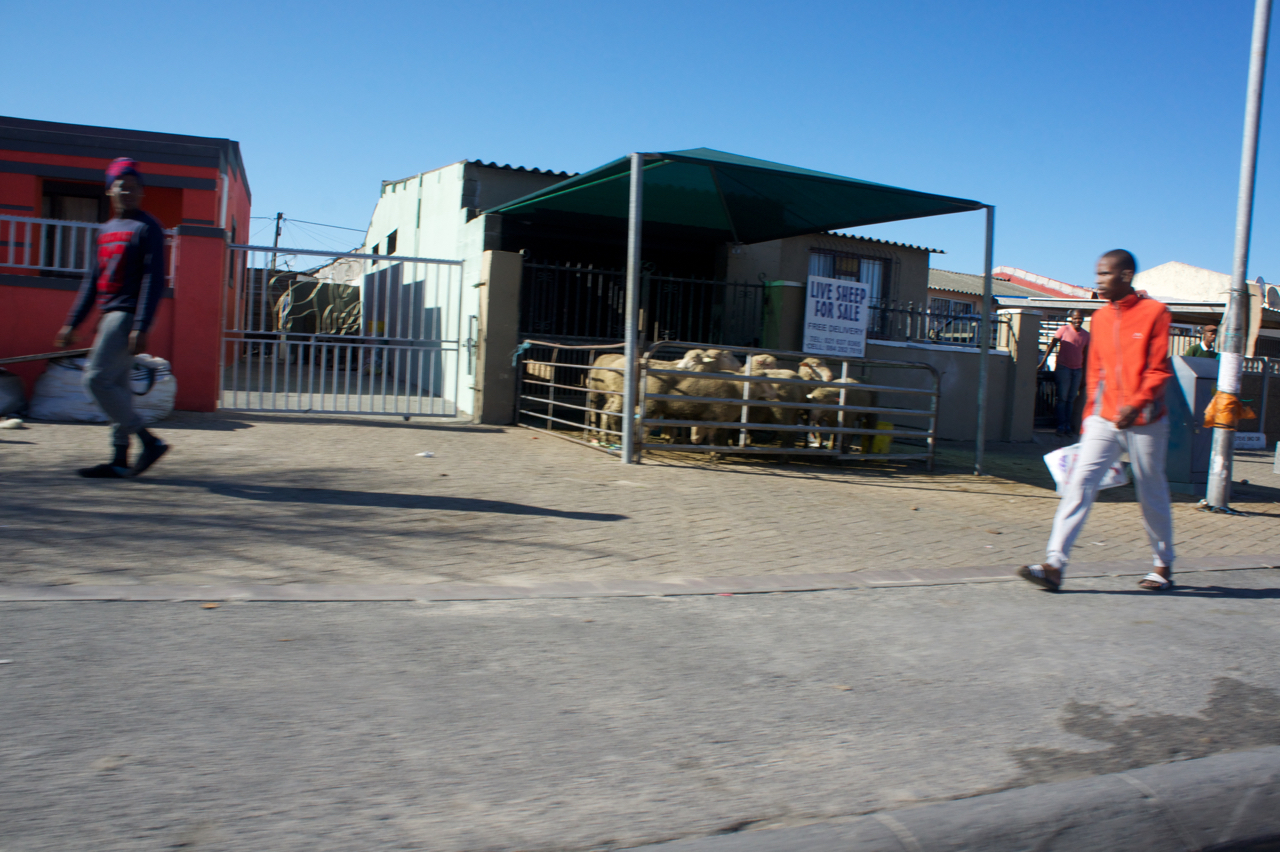
- From top, Mzoli's restaurant & butchery. A spaza shop/grocery run out of an informal house (centre left). A roadside meat market operating out of a household (centre right). The Gugulethu Seven Memorial (bottom).

- Location within Western Cape Location within South Africa Location within Africa
- Coordinates: 33°59′S 18°34′E
- Country: South Africa
- Province: Western Cape
- Municipality: City of Cape Town
- Main Place: Cape Town

Government
  - Councillor: Melody Klaas (ANC) (Ward 40) (Belinda) Ntombende Landingwe (Ward 41) (ANC); Mandisa Matshoba (Ward 42) (ANC); Faiza Adams (Ward 45) (DA)

Area
  - Total: 6.49 km^{2} (2.51 sq mi)

Population (2011)
  - Total: 98,468
  - Density: 15,200/km^{2} (39,300/sq mi)

Racial makeup (2011)
  - Black African: 98.6%
  - Coloured: 0.9%
  - Indian/Asian: 0.1%
  - Other: 0.4%

First languages (2011)
  - Xhosa: 88.6%
  - English: 3.6%
  - Sotho: 1.9%
  - Afrikaans: 1.7%
  - Other: 4.2%
- Time zone: UTC+2 (SAST)
- Postal code (street): 7750, 7752, 7756

Gugulethu is a township in Western Cape, South Africa and is around 20km from Cape Town. The area was the third township to be established in Cape Town, after Nyanga and Langa.

== History ==
The name is a contraction of igugu lethu, which is Xhosa for our pride/ our hope. The establishment of the township began in 1959 as the government was preparing to forcibly remove blacks in Kensington and other suburbs. Africans were officially banned from District Six in 1964 and were forcibly removed to Gugulethu. Because of the large number of blacks who had been residents in District Six, Gugulethu quickly became the most populous township in the Cape Flats. The predominant language in Gugulethu is Xhosa. Gugulethu is passionately called or referred to as "Gugs" by the locals, which is a nickname stemming from the shortening of the name Gugulethu.

Black residents living in Windermere were forcibly moved to Gugulethu when it was declared a black township. Windermere was declared by Apartheid regime to be a colored area.

Gugulethu was one of the first townships in Cape Town to have a community information technology Center to provide training in multimedia and youth development.

== Places of interest ==
The 'Gugulethu Seven Memorial' was built to commemorate the life of seven activists that were ambushed and killed by the South African security forces on March 3, 1986. The activists were members of uMkhonto weSizwe, the armed wing of the African National Congress (ANC). The seven murdered were Jabulani Godfery Miya, Zandisile Zenith Mjobo, Zola Alfred Swelani, Mandla Simon Mxinwa, Themba Mlifi, Zabonke, John Konile, and Christopher Piet. On Human Rights Day 2000, the memorial was unveiled.

- The Cape Town Jazz Safari is a tour which highlights musical history and jazz in Gugulethu.
- Gugulethu Square was created in 2009 as a central business district in the township.
- Gugulethu Indoor Sports Complex is an indoor all year round community facility.
- Mzoli's was a butchery in Gugulethu. Customers bought meat that is cooked on the spot and accompanied by music. It is stated that it attracted about 30,000 people in a single weekend.
- Maboneng Township Arts Experience in Gugulethu and Langa. Tours that turn homes into art galleries where local artists and crafters turn their homes into art galleries. This is an entrepreneurship project.
- Ntonga Music School – in Gugulethu.

== Notable people ==
- Loyiso Gola, stand-up comedian
- Ayabulela Konqobe, footballer
- Sindiwe Magona, author
- Abigail Mbalo-Mokoena, restaurateur
- Mandisa Monakali, the founder and executive director of Ilitha Labantu
- Bantu Mzwakali, footballer
- Thando Mngomeni, former South Africa national football team player
- Siv Ngesi, actor, comedian, presenter
- Nobulumko Nkondlo, politician, Member of the Western Cape Provincial Parliament
- Ray Ntlokwana, actor
- Jonathan Ntutu, para-athlete & paralympian, South Africa's fastest ever para-athlete
- Tony Yengeni, politician, former Chief Whip of the African National Congress

== Crime ==
According to data collected by the South African Institute of Race Relations (SAIRR) over 700 people were murdered in Gugulethu between 2005 and 2010. "This amounts to one murder every two-and-a-half days for five consecutive years." In a 2017 study of the 50 most violent cities in the world, Cape Town ranked number 15.

=== Notable incidents ===
- In March 1986, South Africa's Apartheid security murdered seven young black men. The incident became known as The Gugulethu Seven. The seven men were: Zandisile Zenith Mjobo, Zola Alfred Swelani, Mandla Simon Mxinwa, Godfrey Jabulani Miya, Themba Mlifi, Zabonke John Konile and Christopher "Rasta" Piet. They were members of the military wing of the African National Congress known as Umkhonto we Sizwe.
- In 2017, Major-General Andre Lincoln stated during his testimony while under cross-examination in the Western Cape High Court that police officers removed evidence from the scenes of government-ordered crimes such as The Gugulethu Seven in the 1980s.
- In August 1993, Gugulethu was the site of the violent murder of a young white American woman, Amy Biehl, in the upheaval following the official end of apartheid and before the multi-racial election of 1994. In 1998, four men were convicted of Amy's murder. They were pardoned by the Truth and Reconciliation Commission. Ms. Biehl's family supported the release of the four men. They started the Amy Biehl Foundation Trust in the townships to work with youth. The foundation's goal to empower young disadvantaged youth by using education and culture to deter crime and drugs. An Amy Biehl Memorial site was created in Gugulethu and tours into the township to see the memorial and visit some of the schools where programs were created by the Amy Biehl Foundation.
- In November 2010, Swedish tourist Anni Dewani was murdered in Gugulethu while on her honeymoon. Anni Dewani's husband became a suspect in the trial of her murder. He fought a three-and-a-half-year battle against extradition to South Africa. Accusations and confusions by the accused suspects in the murder that the car-jacking and crime were staged by the billionaire husband Shrien Dewani.
- On June 10, 2014, 62-year-old Mbuyiselo Manona was murdered in Gugulethu by Andrew Chimboza. Chimboza stabbed Manona multiple times. Various news outlets stated that Andrew ate Manona's heart. Chimboza denied it. Chimboza pleaded guilty at the Western Cape High Court of stabbing Mbuyiselo Manona. He did not mention in court anything about removing or eating Manona's heart.
- On the evening of the 2 November 2020 the Gugulethu massacre took place at a home in NY78 in which 8 people died and one was injured.
- On the 27 July 2026, a mass shooting during a home invasion took place at a home in NY50 in which 5 people died and one was injured.

== Organisations and projects in Gugulethu ==
- Treatment Action Campaign
- Western Cape Anti-Eviction Campaign

== See also ==
- The Gugulethu Seven
