= Old Post Office (Albuquerque, New Mexico) =

Coordinates: 35.083951°N 106.651701°W

- U.S. National Register of Historic Places
- NM State Register of Cultural Properties
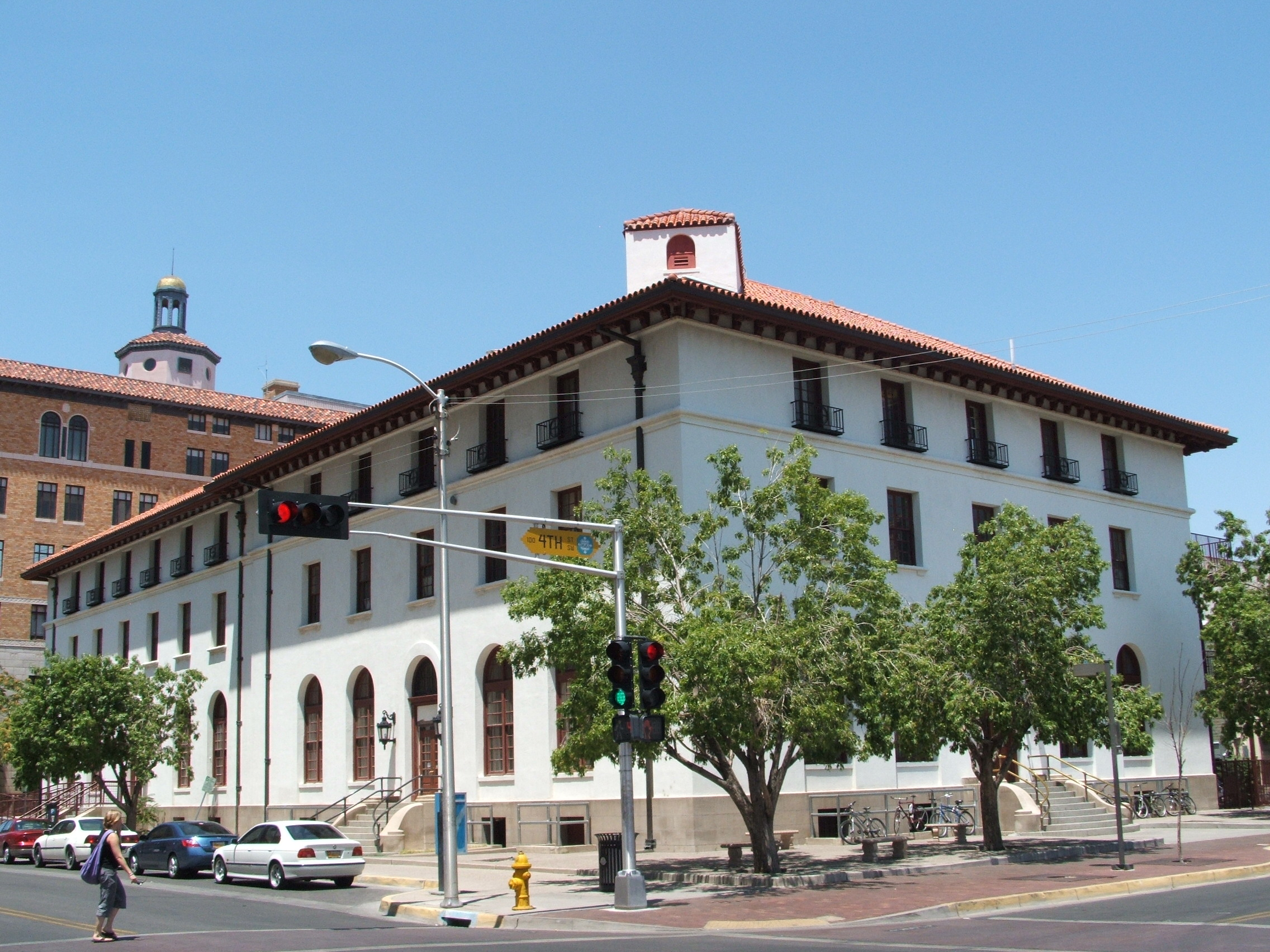
- The Old Post Office
- Location: 123 4th St. Albuquerque, New Mexico
- Built: 1908
- Architect: James Knox Taylor
- Architectural style: Spanish Colonial Revival
- NRHP reference No.: 80002544
- NMSRCP No.: 706

Significant dates
- Added to NRHP: November 17, 1980
- Designated NMSRCP: October 20, 1978

The Old Post Office is the oldest surviving federal building in Albuquerque, New Mexico. Located at the northwest corner of Fourth and Gold in downtown Albuquerque, the Spanish Colonial Revival-style building was built in 1908 under the supervision of architect James Knox Taylor. Several federal agencies were initially housed in the Post Office building but it quickly became overcrowded, necessitating the construction of the Federal Building and U.S. Courthouse next door in 1930. The post office remained in the older building until 1972. Today the interior of the Old Post Office has been remodeled to house the Amy Biehl Charter High School.

The Old Post Office was added to the National Register of Historic Places in 1980. It is a part of a complex of Albuquerque federal buildings that includes the National Register-listed U.S. Courthouse (b. 1930), the former Federal Building (b. 1960) at 517 Gold SW, and the Chavez Federal Building (b. 1965).

== History ==
When, in 1907, Albuquerque reached the "first post office" class since it exceeded the required $40,000 in receipts, the city announced plans and began construction on the new facility. The supervising architect of the project was James Knox Taylor. The finished building cost twice the amount of the projected $100,000. The contractor, Anders Anson, went bankrupt due to changes in the construction plans.

The area's growth was so rapid that upon completion the building was perceived to be inadequate to meet the needs of the Post Office, courts and other tenants. In 1932, an addition was built to the building and in 1930 the larger (and grander) Federal Building was constructed at 421 Gold Avenue.

Throughout its history the building has been remodeled and the spaces changed to accommodate a variety of tenants. The Post Office moved out of this building when the new Dennis Chavez Federal Building was built to include the Post Office. The 1st floor interior was radically remodeled to include more office space.

== Architectural description ==
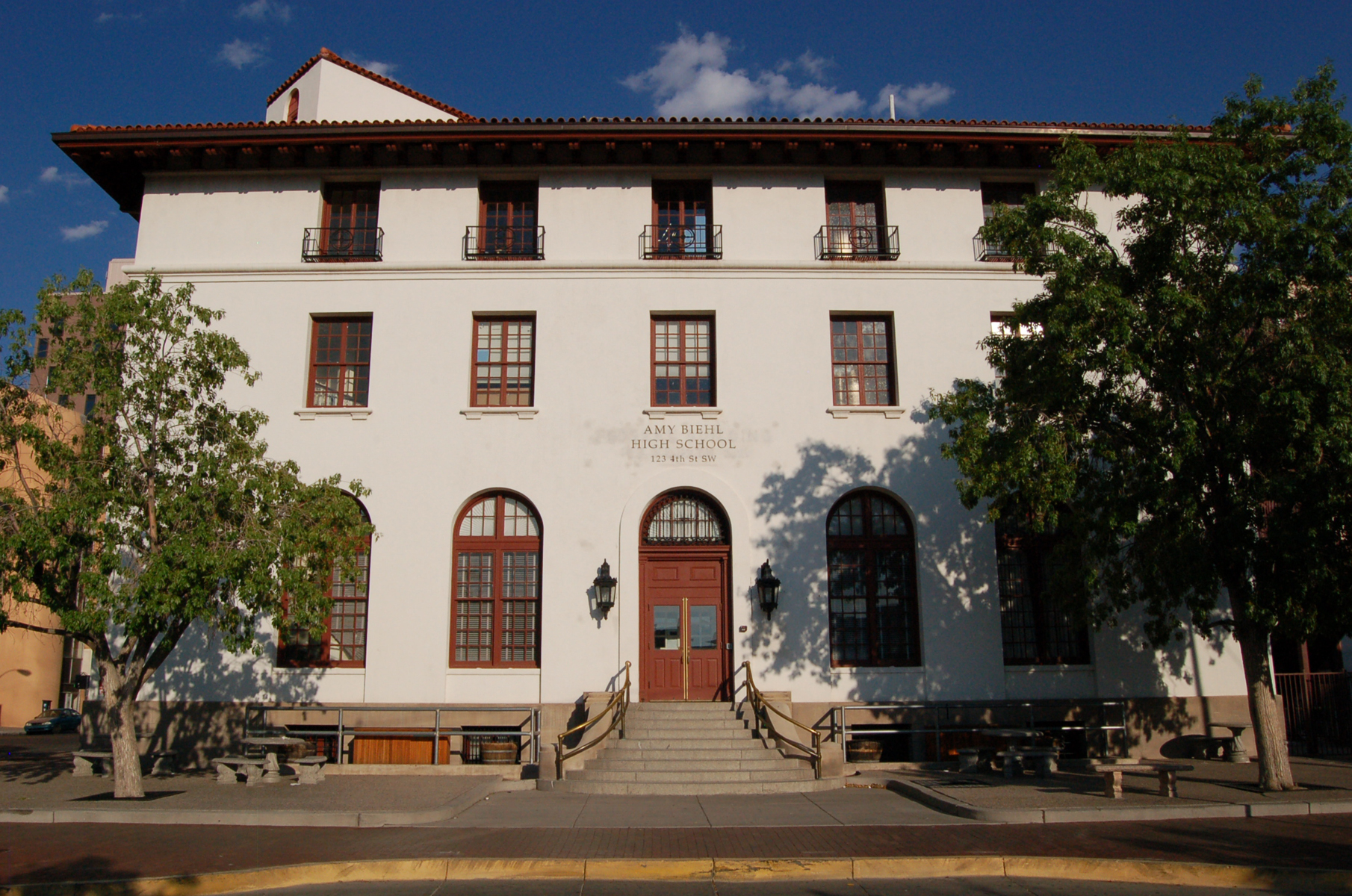
East elevation of the 1908 building

The exterior of the original 1908 building and the 1932 addition are exposed to public view on the east, south, and west elevations. The north elevation of the 1908 building is also visible as it fronts on a parking area. To the casual observer, the building appears to be one single building, but there are clear indications where the 1932 addition begins. The roof color changes slightly where the new roof is spliced in; the 1923 addition is set back slightly; the south entry steps are quite different, and the exposed, carved rafter ends have different patterns in the two buildings.

Both period exteriors consist of a limestone base, stucco finish painted brown up to the eaves, an exposed soffit with massive decorative rafter ends and a red clay tile roof. The 1908 windows and iron balconies are duplicated in the 1932 addition.

== See also ==
- List of United States post offices
