= Amy Biehl =

American anti-apartheid activist, scholar, and murder victim

- Born: Amy Elizabeth Biehl; April 27, 1967; Santa Monica, California, United States
- Died: August 25, 1993 (aged 26); Gugulethu, Cape Province, South Africa
- Cause of death: Stabbing, stoning
- Education: Stanford University
- Occupation: Scholar
- Parent(s): Linda Biehl; Peter Biehl

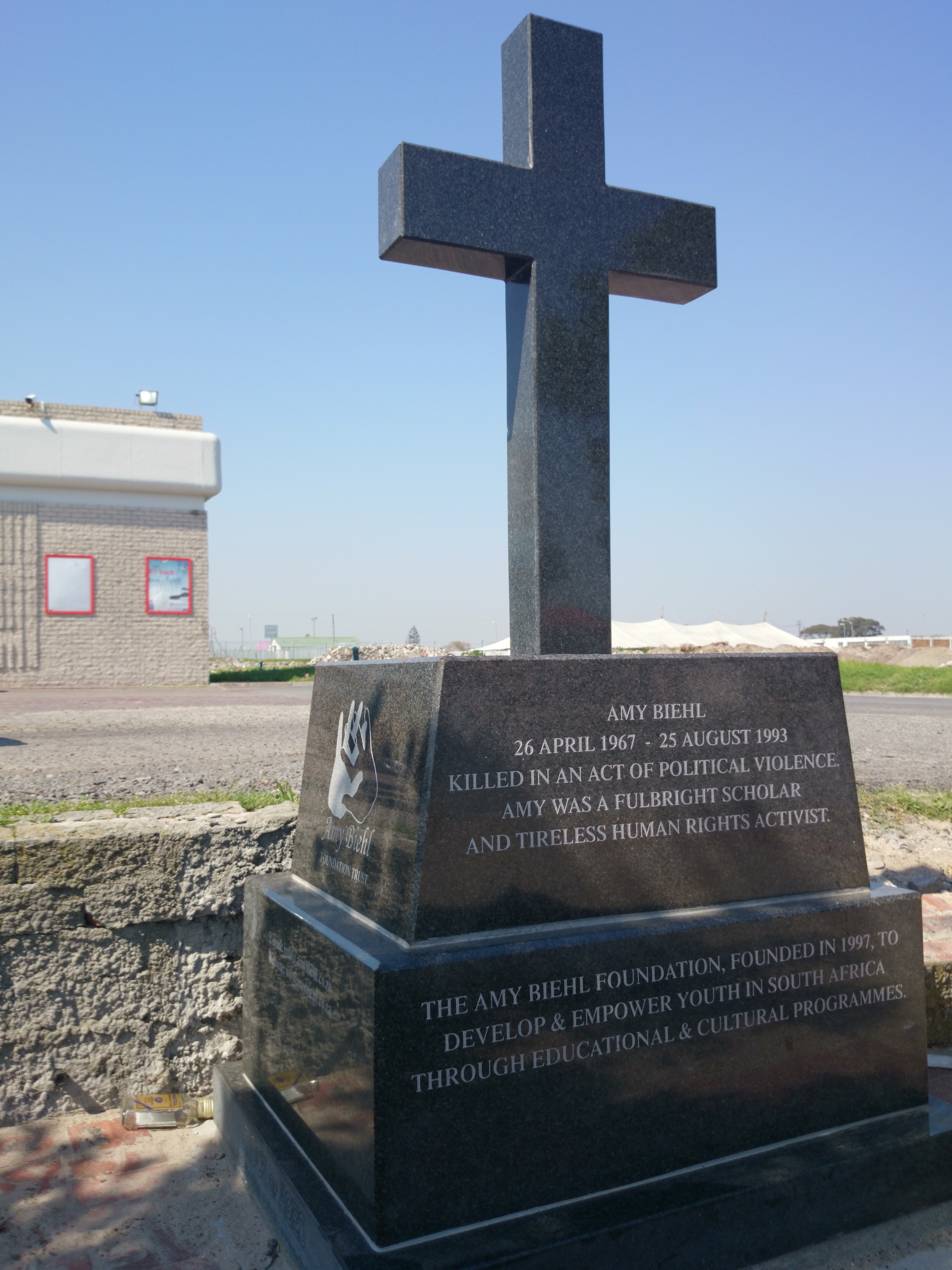
Amy Biehl Foundation Trust, Gugulethu

Amy Elizabeth Biehl (April 26, 1967 – August 25, 1993) was a Fulbright Scholar and American graduate of Stanford University and an anti-Apartheid activist in South Africa who was murdered by a black mob shouting anti-white slurs at her in Cape Town. The four men convicted of her murder were granted amnesty by the Truth and Reconciliation Commission.

== Background ==
Biehl, who was of German descent, was a student at the University of the Western Cape in Cape Town as a scholar in the Fulbright Program.

== Death ==
As she drove three friends home to the township of Gugulethu, outside Cape Town, on August 25, 1993, a mob pulled her from the car and stabbed and stoned her to death. The attack on the car driven by her was one of many incidents of general lawlessness on the N2 highway that afternoon. Bands of toyi-toying youths threw stones at delivery vehicles and cars driven by white people. One delivery vehicle was toppled over and set alight, and only the arrival of the police prevented more damage. There was evidence that some of the possessions belonging to her and the passengers were stolen.

Four people were convicted of killing her.

== Pardons ==
In 1998, all were pardoned by South Africa's Truth and Reconciliation Commission, when they stated that their actions had been politically motivated.

Biehl's family supported the release of the men. Her father shook their hands and stated,

The most important vehicle of reconciliation is open and honest dialogue... we are here to reconcile a human life [that] was taken without an opportunity for dialogue. When we are finished with this process we must move forward with linked arms.

== Legacy ==
In 1994, Biehl's parents, Linda and Peter, founded the Amy Biehl Foundation Trust to develop and empower youth in the townships, in order to discourage further violence. Two of the men who had been convicted of her murder worked for the foundation as part of its programs. In 1999, Biehl's parents were honored with the Aline and Norman Felton Humanitarian Award.

In his speech accepting the Congressional Gold Medal on 23 September 1998, Nelson Mandela said:

Among those we remember today is young Amy Biehl. She made our aspirations her own and lost her life in the turmoil of our transition, as the new South Africa struggled to be born in the dying moments of apartheid. Through her, our peoples have also shared the pain of confronting a terrible past, as we take the path towards the reconciliation and healing of our nation.

On August 25, 2010, on the 17th anniversary of Biehl's death, a bronze plaque mounted on a stone was unveiled by the U.S. Ambassador, Donald Gips, and Biehl's mother, Linda Biehl, at the Cape Town site where she was killed.

The novel Mother to Mother by Sindiwe Magona refers to Amy Biehl's death from the perspective of the mother of one of Biehl's killers.

August 25, 2013, marked the 20th anniversary of Amy Biehl's death and a ceremony was held at the Cape Town site where she was killed in Gugulethu.

Amy Biehl High School in Albuquerque, New Mexico is named in her honor. Amy Biehl Community School at Rancho Viejo in Santa Fe, New Mexico is also named after her.

Biehl's uncle was teacher Dale Shewalter.
