= Sumers Lodge =

Historic house in Colorado, United States

- U.S. National Register of Historic Places
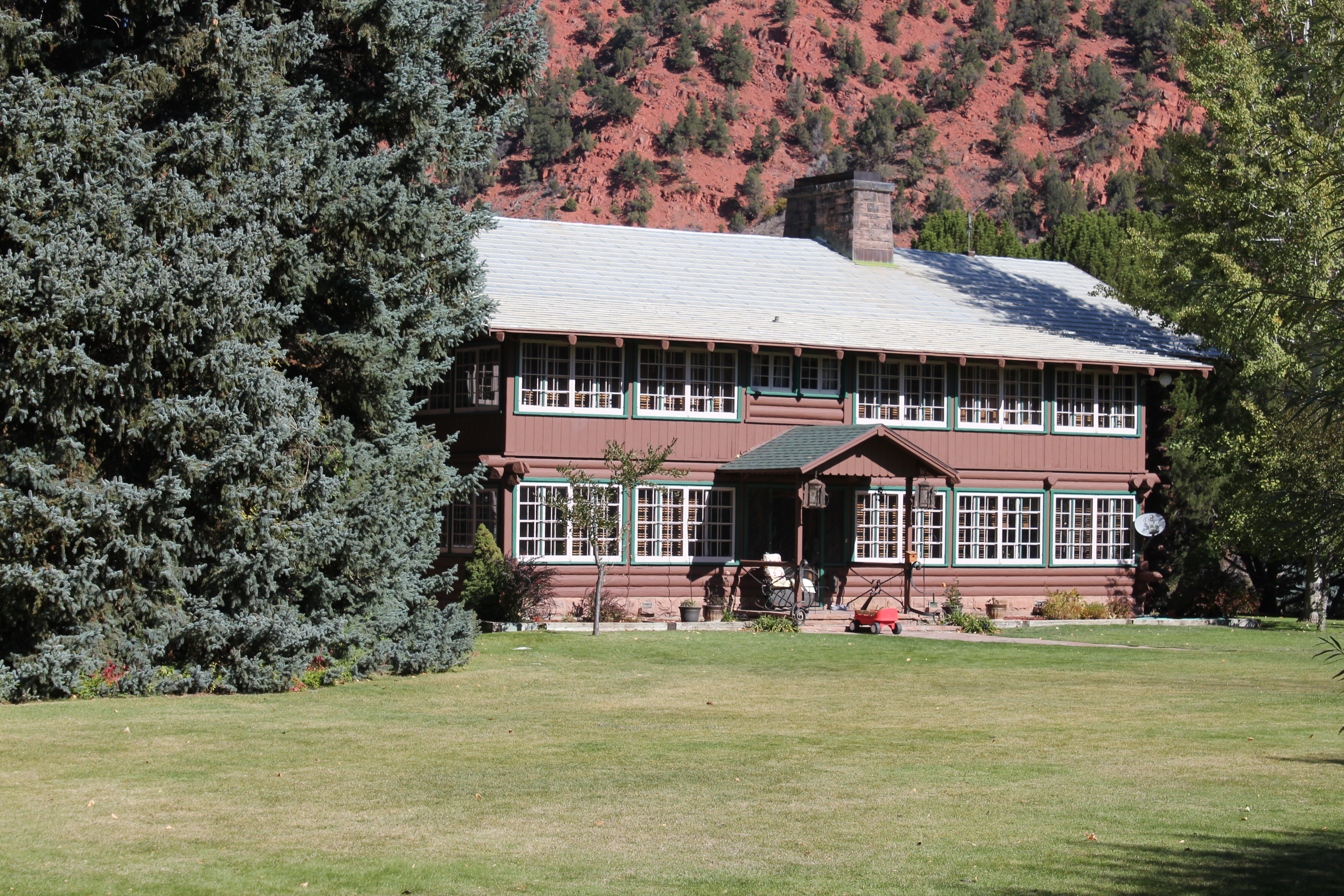

- Location within Colorado Location within the United States
- Nearest city: Glenwood Springs, Colorado
- Coordinates: 39°30′48″N 107°18′53″W
- Area: 5 acres (2.0 ha)
- Built: 1935
- Architect: Aldrich, Chison D.
- Architectural style: Late 19th And Early 20th Century American Movements, Log Kit House
- NRHP reference No.: 97000593
- Added to NRHP: June 20, 1997

The Sumers Lodge in Glenwood Springs, Colorado is a rustic log house built in 1935 for New York financier George Sumers. It was designed by Chilson Aldrich, and some of its furnishings were designed and made by Thomas C. Molesworth.

The Sumers Lodge is a large two story rectangular log structure with a projecting sun porch on the entrance side. It was listed on the National Register of Historic Places in 1997.

== See also ==
- National Register of Historic Places listings in Garfield County, Colorado
