= Ranch A Consolidation and Management Improvement Act =

- Long title: To convey certain property to the State of Wyoming to consolidate the historic Ranch A, and for other purposes.
- Announced in: the 113th United States Congress
- Sponsored by: Rep. Cynthia M. Lummis (R, WY-0)
- Number of co-sponsors: 0

Codification
- Acts affected: Public Law 104-261
- Agencies affected: United States Department of Agriculture, United States Forest Service

Legislative history
- Introduced in the House as H.R. 1684 by Rep. Cynthia M. Lummis (R, WY-0) on April 23, 2013; Committee consideration by United States House Committee on Natural Resources, United States House Natural Resources Subcommittee on Public Lands and Environmental Regulation

The Ranch A Consolidation and Management Improvement Act (H.R. 1684) is a bill that would require the federal government to transfer 10 acres (4.0 ha) of federal lands in the Black Hills National Forest to the state of Wyoming. Wyoming would use the land to connect different, separated pieces of Ranch A. The bill would also remove current restrictions placed on the land that prevents the foundation managing the site from some types of fundraising. Currently, outside groups are not allowed to rent any of the property, which would change under this bill, increasing revenue.

Ranch A presently comprises 645 acres (261 ha), owned by the state of Wyoming. It is managed by the Ranch A Restoration Foundation as an education center. It was placed on the National Register of Historic Places in 1997.

The bill was introduced into the United States House of Representatives during the 113th United States Congress.

== Provisions of the bill ==
This summary is based largely on the summary provided by the Congressional Research Service, a public domain source.

The Ranch A Consolidation and Management Improvement Act would direct the Secretary of Agriculture (USDA), acting through the Forest Service, to convey to Wyoming, upon state request, without consideration and by quitclaim deed, all interest of the United States in approximately 10 acres of National Forest System land located in the Black Hills National Forest in Crook County, Wyoming.

The bill would repeal the requirement that Ranch A be used for: (1) fish and wildlife management and educational activities; and (2) maintenance and restoration of the museum-quality real and personal property there. It would repeal as well the reversionary interest of the United States in the property if the state of Wyoming uses it for any other purpose or develops the property.

== Congressional Budget Office report ==
This summary is based largely on the summary provided by the Congressional Budget Office, as ordered reported by the House Committee on Natural Resources on July 31, 2013. This is a public domain source.

H.R. 1684 would require the United States Forest Service to convey, without consideration, 10 acres of federal land to the state of Wyoming. Based on information provided by the agency, the Congressional Budget Office (CBO) estimates that implementing the legislation would have no significant impact on the federal budget. Enacting H.R. 1684 would not affect direct spending or revenues; therefore, pay-as-you-go procedures do not apply.

The affected lands do not currently generate any receipts and are not expected to generate receipts over the next 10 years. In addition, the Forest Service does not have the authority to sell those lands under current law. Therefore, the CBO estimates that conveying the affected lands would not affect direct spending. Finally, because H.R. 1684 would require the state of Wyoming to cover the cost of surveying the affected lands, the CBO estimates that implementing the bill would have a minimal impact on discretionary spending.

H.R. 1684 contains no intergovernmental or private-sector mandates as defined in the Unfunded Mandates Reform Act.

== Procedural history ==
The Ranch A Consolidation and Management Improvement Act was introduced into the United States House of Representatives on April 23, 2013 by Rep. Cynthia M. Lummis (R, WY-0). It was referred to the United States House Committee on Natural Resources and the United States House Natural Resources Subcommittee on Public Lands and Environmental Regulation. The bill was reported by the committee on September 10, 2013 alongside House Report 113-198. On January 24, 2014, House Majority Leader Eric Cantor announced the H.R. 1684 would be considered under a suspension of the rules on January 27, 2014.

== Debate and discussion ==
Rep. Lummis spoke in favor of the bill arguing that her bill would help the financial situation of the Ranch. She also said that, "by also incorporating the Babcock House, we have an opportunity to make the Ranch whole under the ownership and stewardship of the State of Wyoming, where it belongs and where it will flourish. The State and Foundation have invested in and effectively managed Ranch A for years now; they don’t need the federal government looking over their shoulder to continue doing so responsibly."

== See also ==
- List of bills in the 113th United States Congress
- Federal lands
