= Ranch A =

- U.S. National Register of Historic Places
- U.S. Historic district
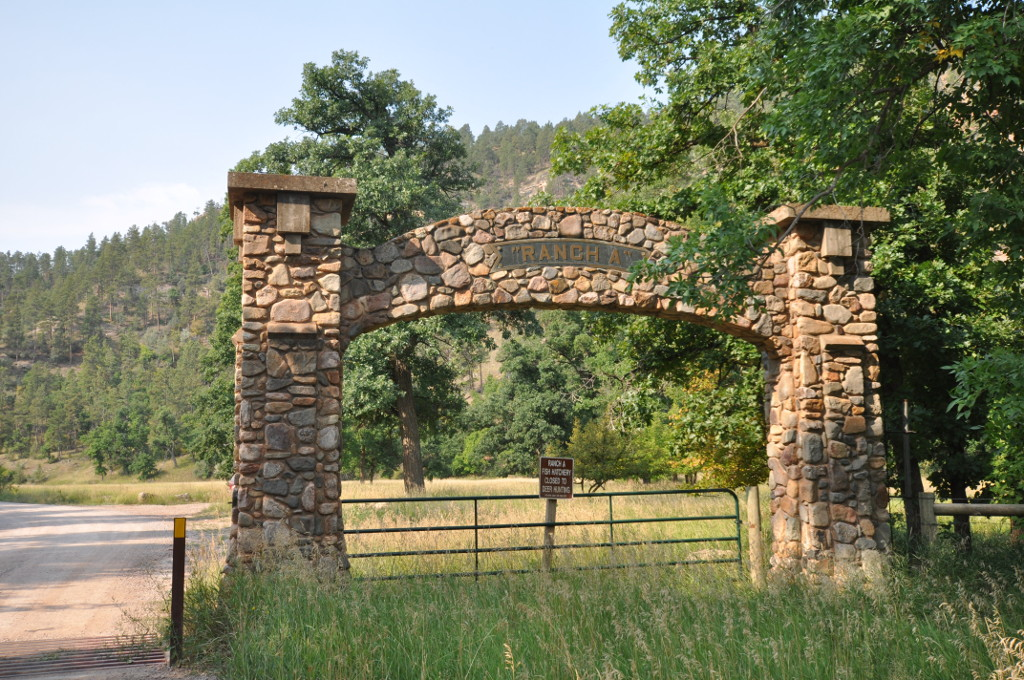

- Location within Wyoming Location within the United States
- Location: Crook County, Wyoming, US
- Nearest city: Beulah, Wyoming
- Coordinates: 44°29′27″N 104°6′53″W
- Area: 410 acres (170 ha)
- Built: 1932
- Architect: Ewing, Ray; Juso Bros.
- Architectural style: Rustic
- NRHP reference No.: 97000227
- Added to NRHP: March 17, 1997

Ranch A, near Beulah, Wyoming, was built as a vacation retreat for newspaper publisher Moses Annenberg. The original log ranch structures in Sand Creek Canyon were designed in the rustic style by architect Ray Ewing. The principal building, a large log lodge, was built in 1932. Other buildings constructed at the time included a garage with an upstairs apartment, a barn, a hydroelectric power plant, stone entrance arches and a pump house. The lodge was furnished with Western furniture and light fixtures made by noted designer Thomas C. Molesworth. Many of these furnishings, among the first of Molesworth's career, are now the property of the state of Wyoming and are in the Wyoming State Museum.

== History ==
Annenberg bought the property around November 1927 from Frank LaPlante. Annenberg and his son Walter were going to Yellowstone National Park and stopped to eat in Beulah. Impressed with the trout he was served, Annenberg inquired after the property where the trout was raised. He bought the 650-acre (260 ha) ranch from LaPlante on the spot the next day for $27,000 [today worth around $303,000 in 2010 dollars] in cash, which Annenberg produced from his pocket. Annenberg added more parcels to bring total acreage to more than 2,000 acres (810 ha). Moses and Walter Annenberg were the chief users of the ranch; Sadie Annenberg and her daughters came to the ranch only once. Guests arrived by rail at Aladdin, Wyoming, where the tracks ended, on private railcars owned by Annenberg. As publisher of the Daily Racing Form, Annenberg had a telephone communication center installed in the basement for coordination of horse racing information.

The design work was done by South Dakota architect Ray Ewing, who hired the Juso Brothers to build the structures. The Jusos were Finnish immigrants who used traditional Finnish log building practices to fell, trim and erect the logs for the lodge and supporting structures. Work took place during the Great Depression, employing sixty to seventy workers, a significant project for the local economy. Site planning and landscape architecture were done by South Dakota landscape architect J.R. McKay.

Annenberg came under Federal investigation for his business practices in the late 1930s and was convicted of income tax evasion in 1940, was imprisoned, and died shortly after his release in 1942. Annenberg's heirs sold the ranch to Wyoming governor Nels Smith, Bill Walker (Cheyenne, Wyoming) and Sam Keener (Salem, Ohio). Ranch A was used as a dude ranch for twenty years, and was featured in an October 1956 issue of National Geographic. In 1963 the Fish and Wildlife Service bought the ranch, using it as a genetics laboratory for salmonid research under the name "Spearfish Fisheries Center Complex." After 1979 the genetic research was replaced by fish diet research. The ranch was deeded to the state of Wyoming in 1996 for educational purposes.

== Description ==
Sand Creek is a spring-fed stream with a consistent water temperature that is ideal for raising fish. The complex is located on the floor of the canyon with sandstone cliffs rising to either side. The lodge is sited near the northern canyon wall. Square in plan, the two-story lodge measures about 74 feet (23 m) by 75 feet (23 m). The second story overhangs the first, creating a long veranda across the front of the building, supported by stone piers with standing log sections as columns. The entrance is a knotty pine double door with iron strap hardware. The second story is a side gable dominated by shed dormers extending nearly the full width of the building, front and back. A small cross gable marks the center of the second story. A walkway extends directly from the rear of the second floor to the hillside behind. The interior features an atrium extending to the roof, surrounded by living spaces on both levels, framed in log construction.

The garage is also of log construction, measuring 44 feet (13 m) by 44 feet (13 m), with three bays for vehicles, one of which has since been closed in. The second floor is framed as a smaller version of the lodge, and houses a three-bedroom caretaker's apartment.

The barn was built about 1935 and measures about 63 feet (19 m) by 43 feet (13 m). The peeled log walls rest on a concrete foundation. A gambrel roof crowns the two-story structure. Other contributing structures include the pump house (1932), built in stucco with applied half-timber detailing and a rolled roof edge. The 1933 hydroelectric plant is similar in style and construction. Dams are associated with each building. A root cellar, stone walls, a lily pond and its feeder canal all date from the historical period.

Additional buildings include the fish hatchery lab, a 1967 brick building, the distinctive Sawtooth Building (ca. 1964) or Wet Laboratory, another hatchery building with a sawtooth roof profile, and several apartments.

== Management by the foundation ==
Ranch A Includes 645 acres (261 ha) owned by the state of Wyoming. It is managed by the Ranch A Restoration Foundation as an education center. It was placed on the National Register of Historic Places in 1997.

On April 23, 2013, Congresswoman Cynthia Lummis introduced the Ranch A Consolidation and Management Improvement Act (H.R. 1684; 113th Congress). The bill requires the federal government to transfer 10 acres (4.0 ha) of federal lands in the Black Hills National Forest to the state of Wyoming. The land connects different, separated pieces of Ranch A for Wyoming. The bill also removes the restrictions placed on the land that prevents the foundation managing the site from some types of fundraising. Formerly, outside groups were not allowed to rent any of the property, which changed under this bill, increasing revenue.
