= Lawrence Tenney Stevens =

American sculptor

- Born: 1896; Massachusetts
- Died: 1972 (aged 75–76)
- Education: Boston Museum School, American Academy in Rome
- Known for: Sculptor
- Movement: Art Deco, Cowboy High Style
- Awards: Rome Prize
- Website: http://www.lawrencetenneystevens.com/Welcome.html

Lawrence Tenney Stevens (1896-1972) was an American sculptor who was one of the progenitors of the "Cowboy High Style" movement in western American art and furniture. He created large allegorical figures and stylized depictions of the American west.

== Early life and education ==
Born in Massachusetts in 1896, Stevens first showed an interest in sculpture in his early adolescence, and began experimenting with figures after his grandfather demonstrated how to carve figures from a broken alabaster vase. He continued to study sculpture throughout high school, his progress prompting the art director for the school district to lobby the school district pay to send Stevens to evening classes with Harvard students at Copley Plaza Studios. Upon graduating, Stevens was accepted into the Boston Museum School where he continued his studies under the tutelage of Bela Pratt.

Stevens volunteered for the armed forces in 1917 to fight in World War I. Upon his return from the war, he resumed his studies at the Boston Museum School and spent the two following summers at the Louis Comfort Tiffany Foundation, which Tiffany founded to help encourage and fund up-and-coming young artists.

== Prix de Rome fellowship ==
Stevens first garnered international attention when he won the Rome Prize for sculpture in 1922, receiving a fellowship to study sculpture at the American Academy in Rome as well as funds to travel to experience the art of Western Europe. Precedent dictated that the Prix de Rome fellows would spend time in Greece studying the classical sculpture there, but Stevens instead decided to go to Egypt. His time with the Ancient Egyptian bas-relief murals and stylized sculpture heavily impacted his style, which would continue to evoke ancient Egyptian and contemporary Art Deco influences throughout his life.

Before his trip to Rome, Stevens would meet Daniel Chester French, a fellow American sculptor whose most famous work is the colossal statue of Abraham Lincoln in the Lincoln Memorial in Washington, D.C. French confided to Stevens that he wished he had Stevens' position in the art world at a time when French believed America was beginning to gain clout and credibility in sculpture. Following this exchange, Stevens made his artistic focus to use his sculpture to glorify that which he believed was uniquely American, and American-made. During his trip to Europe, Stevens would express his disapproval at the number of American expatriate artists, condemning them as "un-American" and saying they lacked faith in American sculpture.

== Return to the USA ==
After taking several commissions in New York, Stevens moved out west to Santa Barbara. It was in Southern California that he first met Millard Sheets, already an established artist and founding professor of the fine arts program at Scripps College. The two artists became friends, and Stevens accompanied Sheets on his yearly trip to Mexico in 1934, where the two painted watercolors. Stevens' sculpture "Monument to the Young Farmers of the Nation" (1938) currently stands at the entrance to the Millard Sheets Center for the Arts in Los Angeles, California. Sheets landed Stevens a one-man exhibition at Scripps in 1935 that displayed both Stevens' sculpture and the watercolors he had painted with Sheets. One of the pieces in the exhibition, a ceramic sea lion, was duplicated by Scripps professor William Manker and became the fountains in Scripps' Seal Court (the pieces were later recast in bronze by Paul Soldner). Sheets later persuaded Stevens to loan his 1931 piece "Doors of Life" to the college for the new Florence Rand Lang art building, now the Elizabeth Hubert Malott Commons, built in 1939. The doors remained on long term loan until Scripps College Trustee Mrs. G. F. Cruickshank agreed to donate the doors officially.

== Cody and WWII years ==
Meanwhile, Stevens had been spending his summers in Cody, Wyoming working on expanding his American West-themed body of work. He modeled and sculpted in clay, plaster, bronze and marble everything from the animals and workers of the ranches to the champion bronco riders he saw at local rodeos. He was granted the first one-man show at Cody's Buffalo Bill Museum in 1932. It was in Cody that Cowboy High Style began to develop, catalyzed both by Stevens' work and the work of local furniture designer Thomas Molesworth, both of whom championed simple designs imbued with the spirit of the American West. Stevens' figures from this period are scattered all over the American Southwest. One of his largest commissions was for the Centennial Fairgrounds and Esplanade for the 1936 Texas Centennial Exposition in Dallas. He created three monumental allegorical figures, "Tenor", "Contralto", and "Texas", along with a representation of the chimera-like nonsense creature of Texan folklore, the "Woofus". The bronze sculptures were melted down to help the war effort during World War II, but the figures were reconstructed in stainless steel in 2009 and have been restored to their original positions.

After this commission, Stevens began to sculpt large allegorical figures such as "America" (1941), "American Sculptor" (1941), and "The Confederacy" (1941) as part of his canon in addition to his original cowboys and animals. In 1939 he won a competition to create colossal monuments for the New York World's Fair. Stevens volunteered for military service once more when the United States entered WWII, and was assigned to a secret unit called Project 19.

== Post-war years ==
Stevens returned from the war and settled in Tulsa before moving to Arizona with his second wife. He lived and sculpted in Tempe, Arizona until his death in 1972.
