= Upcharge =

Incremental charge beyond posted price

Upcharge is used as the billing counterpart to marketing's upsell.

The term may refer to:

- Paying a smaller increment in price for a larger increase in what is received; in another it means paying an increase for a non-standard arrangement, what one writer called "upcharge money."
- A convenience fee: a pharmacy that carries basic grocery items and charges higher prices for the non-pharmaceutical one-stop-shopping items. While a surcharge is part of what must be paid, an upcharge is not always unexpected, and usually can be declined by rejecting the additional service or the suggested upgrade, albeit receiving less.

The practice of amusement parks to charge both for admission and then for individual rides may be described as "Upcharge attraction".

The term upcharge is sometimes used as a synonym for charge or surcharge.
