= Thomas C. Molesworth =

American interior designer (1890–1977)

Thomas C. Molesworth (1890–1977) was an American furniture designer who was a significant figure in the creation of a distinctly Western style of furniture and accessories, using hides, horn and natural wood. Molesworth's style drew from the Arts and Crafts Movement and from vernacular design characteristics of western American ranches and farms. He is credited with popularizing the "cowboy furniture" style. To produce his designs, Molesworth operated the Shoshone Furniture Company from 1931 to 1961 in Cody, Wyoming with his wife, LaVerne Johnston Molesworth.

Molesworth was born in Kansas and attended the Art Institute of Chicago. He worked in Chicago for a furniture company, then enlisted in the U.S. Marine Corps and served as a corporal in France in 1917, having married LaVerne that year. Returning after the war, he worked in a bank in South Dakota, then managed the Rowe Furniture Company in Billings, Montana. Molesworth moved his family, including LaVerne and his children Lee and Jean to Cody in May, 1931.

Molesworth's company and career received a major boost in 1933 when he was commissioned by publisher Moses Annenberg to design the interior furnishings for Annenberg's Ranch A retreat near Beulah, Wyoming. Annenberg noticed Molesworth's work in the company's storefront in Cody and gave him the commission for the new ranch. Molesworth created 245 pieces of furniture for Ranch A, as well as lighting fixtures and accessories, choosing Navajo rugs and taxidermy to set off his designs. Many of the furnishings from Ranch A are conserved at the Wyoming State Museum.

Molesworth furniture furnished the TE Ranch in Cody, the Plains Hotel in Cheyenne, Wyoming, the Wort Hotel in Jackson, Wyoming, the Pendleton Hotel in Pendleton, Oregon, the Stockman's Hotel in Elko, Nevada the Ferris Hotel in Rawlins, Wyoming and the Northern Hotel in Billings. He sold individual pieces to a number of hotels in Wyoming and Montana. Other major Molesworth commissions include the Pahaska Tepee Ski Lodge (burned 1942), the Old Lodge and the Sumers Lodge in Glenwood Springs, Colorado, the Rockefeller ranch in Jackson, and U.S. President Dwight D. Eisenhower's house in Gettysburg, Pennsylvania.

Later in his career Molesworth was commissioned by Wyoming Governor Milward Simpson to make pieces for the Wyoming Historic Governor's Mansion. After his death his work gained in popularity after the 1989 exhibition Interior West: The Craft and Style of Thomas Molesworth at the Buffalo Bill Historical Center in Cody and in 1990 at the Autry National Center in Los Angeles.
