= List of acts of the 114th United States Congress =

The list of acts of the 114th United States Congress includes all Acts of Congress and ratified treaties by the 114th United States Congress, which began on January 3, 2015, and lasted until January 3, 2017.

Acts include public and private laws, which are enacted after being passed by Congress and signed by the President; however, if the President vetoes a bill it can still be enacted by a two-thirds vote in both houses. The Senate alone considers treaties, which must be ratified by a two-thirds vote.

== Summary of actions ==
President Barack Obama vetoed the following bills during the 114th Congress. The Justice Against Sponsors of Terrorism Act has been enacted by Congress over the President's veto.

1. February 24, 2015: Vetoed S. 1, Keystone XL Pipeline Approval Act. Override attempt failed in Senate, 62–36 (66 needed).
2. March 31, 2015: Vetoed S.J.Res. 8, A joint resolution providing for congressional disapproval under chapter 8 of title 5, United States Code, of the rule submitted by the National Labor Relations Board relating to representation case procedures. (Note: While the president cites the Pocket Veto Case in his memorandum, he also returned the joint resolution to the Secretary of the Senate, as the Senate had provided for the receipt of presidential messages during its adjournment. Therefore, this is a regular veto rather than a pocket veto. See Congressional Record 114th Congress, First Session, page S2085, "Unanimous Consent Agreement - Veto Override".) The Senate voted to table the veto message rather than vote on and override of the veto. Tabled 96-3.
3. October 22, 2015: Vetoed H.R. 1735, National Defense Authorization Act for Fiscal Year 2016.
4. December 19, 2015: Vetoed S.J.Res. 23, A joint resolution providing for congressional disapproval under chapter 8 of title 5, United States Code, of a rule submitted by the Environmental Protection Agency relating to "Standards of Performance for Greenhouse Gas Emissions from New, Modified, and Reconstructed Stationary Sources: Electric Utility Generating Units".
5. December 19, 2015: Vetoed S.J.Res. 24, A joint resolution providing for congressional disapproval under chapter 8 of title 5, United States Code, of a rule submitted by the Environmental Protection Agency relating to "Carbon Pollution Emission Guidelines for Existing Stationary Sources: Electric Utility Generating Units".
6. January 8, 2016: Vetoed H.R. 3762, the Restoring Americans' Healthcare Freedom Reconciliation Act of 2015. Override attempt failed in House, 241-186 (285 votes needed).
7. January 19, 2016: Vetoed S.J.Res. 22, A joint resolution providing for congressional disapproval under chapter 8 of title 5, United States Code, of the rule submitted by the Corps of Engineers and the Environmental Protection Agency relating to the definition of "waters of the United States" under the Federal Water Pollution Control Act
8. June 8, 2016: Vetoed H.J.Res. 88, joint resolution disapproving the rule submitted by the Department of Labor relating to the definition of the term "Fiduciary".
9. September 23, 2016: Passed over veto S. 2040, Justice Against Sponsors of Terrorism Act.

== Public laws ==
Public law number (Linked to Wikisource)	Date of enactment	Official short title(s)	Official description	Link to GPO
114-1	January 12, 2015	Terrorism Risk Insurance Program Reauthorization Act of 2015, with: National Association of Registered Agents and Brokers Reform Act of 2015, Business Risk Mitigation and Price Stabilization Act of 2015	To extend the termination date of the Terrorism Insurance Program established under the Terrorism Risk Insurance Act of 2002, and for other purposes	Pub. L. 114–1 (text) (PDF)
114-2	February 12, 2015	Clay Hunt SAV Act	To direct the Secretary of Veterans Affairs to provide for the conduct of annual evaluations of mental health care and suicide prevention programs of the Department of Veterans Affairs, to require a pilot program on loan repayment for psychiatrists who agree to serve in the Veterans Health Administration of the Department of Veterans Affairs, and for other purposes	Pub. L. 114–2 (text) (PDF)
114-3	February 27, 2015	Protecting Volunteer Firefighters and Emergency Responders Act	To amend the Internal Revenue Code of 1986 to ensure that emergency services volunteers are not taken into account as employees under the shared responsibility requirements contained in the Patient Protection and Affordable Care Act	Pub. L. 114–3 (text) (PDF)
114-4	March 4, 2015	Department of Homeland Security Appropriations Act, 2015	Making appropriations for the Department of Homeland Security for the fiscal year ending September 30, 2015, and for other purposes	Pub. L. 114–4 (text) (PDF)
114-5	March 7, 2015	(No short title)	To award a Congressional Gold Medal to the Foot Soldiers who participated in Bloody Sunday, Turnaround Tuesday, or the final Selma to Montgomery Voting Rights March in March 1965, which served as a catalyst for the Voting Rights Act of 1965	Pub. L. 114–5 (text) (PDF)
114-6	March 20, 2015	Office of Compliance Administrative and Technical Corrections Act of 2015	To make administrative and technical corrections to the Congressional Accountability Act of 1995	Pub. L. 114–6 (text) (PDF)
114-7	April 1, 2015	Slain Officer Family Support Act of 2015	To accelerate the income tax benefits for charitable cash contributions for the relief of the families of New York Police Department Detectives Wenjian Liu and Rafael Ramos, and for other purposes	Pub. L. 114–7 (text) (PDF)
114-8	April 7, 2015	(No short title)	To designate the Federal building located at 2030 Southwest 145th Avenue in Miramar, Florida, as the "Benjamin P. Grogan and Jerry L. Dove Federal Building"	Pub. L. 114–8 (text) (PDF)
114-9	April 7, 2015	(No short title)	Providing for the reappointment of David M. Rubenstein as a citizen regent of the Board of Regents of the Smithsonian Institution	Pub. L. 114–9 (text) (PDF)
114-10	April 16, 2015	Medicare Access and CHIP Reauthorization Act of 2015	To amend title XVIII of the Social Security Act to repeal the Medicare sustainable growth rate and strengthen Medicare access by improving physician payments and making other improvements, to reauthorize the Children's Health Insurance Program, and for other purposes	Pub. L. 114–10 (text) (PDF)
114-11	April 30, 2015	Energy Efficiency Improvement Act of 2015, with: Better Buildings Act of 2015	To promote energy efficiency.	Pub. L. 114–11 (text) (PDF)
114-12	May 19, 2015	Rafael Ramos and Wenjian Liu National Blue Alert Act of 2015	To encourage, enhance, and integrate Blue Alert plans throughout the United States in order to disseminate information when a law enforcement officer is seriously injured or killed in the line of duty, is missing in connection with the officer's official duties, or an imminent and credible threat that an individual intends to cause the serious injury or death of a law enforcement officer is received, and for other purposes	Pub. L. 114–12 (text) (PDF)
114-13	May 19, 2015	(No short title)	To clarify the effective date of certain provisions of the Border Patrol Agent Pay Reform Act of 2014, and for other purposes	Pub. L. 114–13 (text) (PDF)
114-14	May 22, 2015	Don't Tax Our Fallen Public Safety Heroes Act	To amend the Internal Revenue Code of 1986 to exclude certain compensation received by public safety officers and their dependents from gross income purposes	Pub. L. 114–14 (text) (PDF)
114-15	May 22, 2015	(No short title)	To designate the facility of the United States Postal Service located at 820 Elmwood Avenue in Providence, Rhode Island, as the "Sister Ann Keefe Post Office"	Pub. L. 114–15 (text) (PDF)
114-16	May 22, 2015	(No short title)	To designate the United States Customs and Border Protection Port of Entry located at First Street and Pan American Avenue in Douglas, Arizona, as the "Raul Hector Castro Port of Entry"	Pub. L. 114–16 (text) (PDF)
114-17	May 22, 2015	Iran Nuclear Agreement Review Act of 2015	To provide for congressional review and oversight of agreements relating to Iran's nuclear program, and for other purposes	Pub. L. 114–17 (text) (PDF)
114-18	May 22, 2015	WIOA Technical Amendments Act	To amend the Workforce Innovation and Opportunity Act to improve the Act	Pub. L. 114–18 (text) (PDF)
114-19	May 22, 2015	Construction Authorization and Choice Improvement Act	To extend the authorization for the replacement of the existing Department of Veterans Affairs Medical Center in Denver, Colorado, to make certain improvements in the Veterans' Access to Care through Choice, Accountability, and Transparency Act of 2014, and for other purposes	Pub. L. 114–19 (text) (PDF)
114-20	May 29, 2015	(No short title)	To designate the United States courthouse located at 700 Grant Street in Pittsburgh, Pennsylvania, as the "Joseph F. Weis Jr. United States Courthouse"	Pub. L. 114–20 (text) (PDF)
114-21	May 29, 2015	Highway and Transportation Funding Act of 2015	To provide an extension of Federal-aid highway, highway safety, motor carrier safety, transit, and other programs funded out of the Highway Trust Fund, and for other purposes	Pub. L. 114–21 (text) (PDF)
114-22	May 29, 2015	Justice for Victims of Trafficking Act of 2015, with: Combat Human Trafficking Act of 2015, Survivors of Human Trafficking Empowerment Act, Bring Missing Children Home Act, Stop Advertising Victims of Emploitation Act of 2015 (SAVE Act of 2015), Human Exploitation Rescue Operations Act of 2015 (HERO Act of 2015), Rape Survivor Child Custody Act, Military Sex Offender Reporting Act of 2015, Trafficking Awareness Training for Health Care Act of 2015, Ensuring a Better Response for Victims of Child Sex Trafficking, Human Trafficking Survivors Relief and Empowerment Act of 2015	To provide justice for the victims of trafficking	Pub. L. 114–22 (text) (PDF)
114-23	June 2, 2015	USA Freedom Act: Uniting and Strengthening America by Fulfilling Rights and Ensuring Effective Discipline Over Monitoring Act of 2015	To reform the authorities of the Federal Government to require the production of certain business records, conduct electronic surveillance, use pen registers and trap and trace devices, and use other forms of information gathering for foreign intelligence, counterterrorism, and criminal purposes, and for other purposes	Pub. L. 114–23 (text) (PDF)
114-24	June 12, 2015	Girls Count Act of 2015	To authorize the Secretary of State and the Administrator of the United States Agency for International Development to provide assistance to support the rights of women and girls in developing countries, and for other purposes	Pub. L. 114–24 (text) (PDF)
114-25	June 15, 2015	(No short title)	To extend the authorization to carry out the replacement of the existing medical center of the Department of Veterans Affairs in Denver, Colorado, to authorize transfers of amounts to carry out the replacement of such medical center, and for other purposes	Pub. L. 114–25 (text) (PDF)
114-26	June 29, 2015	Defending Public Safety Employees' Retirement Act, with: Bipartisan Congressional Trade Priorities and Accountability Act of 2015	To amend the Internal Revenue Code of 1986 to allow Federal law enforcement officers, firefighters, and air traffic controllers to make penalty-free withdrawals from governmental plans after age 50, and for other purposes	Pub. L. 114–26 (text) (PDF)
114-27	June 29, 2015	Trade Preferences Extension Act of 2015, with: AGOA Extension and Enhancement Act of 2015, Trade Adjustment Assistance Reauthorization Act of 2015, American Trade Enforcement Effectiveness Act	To extend the African Growth and Opportunity Act, the Generalized System of Preferences, the preferential duty treatment program for Haiti, and for other purposes	Pub. L. 114–27 (text) (PDF)
114-28	July 6, 2015	(No short title)	To revoke the charter of incorporation of the Miami Tribe of Oklahoma at the request of that tribe, and for other purposes	Pub. L. 114–28 (text) (PDF)
114-29	July 6, 2015	Department of Homeland Security Interoperable Communications Act	To amend the Homeland Security Act of 2002 to require the Under Secretary for Management of the Department of Homeland Security to take administrative action to achieve and maintain interoperable communications capabilities among the components of the Department of Homeland Security, and for other purposes	Pub. L. 114–29 (text) (PDF)
114-30	July 6, 2015	Boys Town Centennial Commemorative Coin Act	To require the Secretary of the Treasury to mint coins in commemoration of the centennial of Boys Town, and for other purposes	Pub. L. 114–30 (text) (PDF)
114-31	July 20, 2015	Veterans Identification Card Act 2015	To amend title 38, United States Code, to direct the Secretary of Veterans Affairs to issue, upon request, veteran identification cards to certain veterans	Pub. L. 114–31 (text) (PDF)
114-32	July 20, 2015	(No short title)	To designate the facility of the United States Postal Service located at 7050 Highway BB in Cedar Hill, Missouri, as the "Sergeant First Class William B. Woods, Jr. Post Office"	Pub. L. 114–32 (text) (PDF)
114-33	July 20, 2015	(No short title)	To designate the facility of the United States Postal Service located at 141 Paloma Drive in Floresville, Texas, as the "Floresville Veterans Post Office Building"	Pub. L. 114–33 (text) (PDF)
114-34	July 20, 2015	(No short title)	To designate the facility of the United States Postal Service located at 2000 Mulford Road in Mulberry, Florida, as the "Sergeant First Class Daniel M. Ferguson Post Office"	Pub. L. 114–34 (text) (PDF)
114-35	July 20, 2015	(No short title)	To designate the facility of the United States Postal Service located at 442 East 167th Street in Bronx, New York, as the "Herman Badillo Post Office Building"	Pub. L. 114–35 (text) (PDF)
114-36	July 20, 2015	(No short title)	To amend the United States Cotton Futures Act to exclude certain cotton futures contracts from coverage under such Act	Pub. L. 114–36 (text) (PDF)
114-37	July 20, 2015	(No short title)	To designate the facility of the United States Postal Service located at 143rd Avenue, NW, in Chisholm, Minnesota, as the "James L. Oberstar Memorial Post Office Building"	Pub. L. 114–37 (text) (PDF)
114-38	July 28, 2015	Veterans Entrepreneurship Act of 2015	To amend the Small Business Act to increase access to capital for veteran entrepreneurs, to help create jobs, and for other purposes	Pub. L. 114–38 (text) (PDF)
114-39	July 30, 2015	Medicare Independence at Home Medical Practice Demonstration Improvement Act of 2015	To amend title XVIII of the Social Security Act to provide for an increase in the limit on the length of an agreement under the Medicare independence at home medical practice demonstration program	Pub. L. 114–39 (text) (PDF)
114-40	July 30, 2015	Steve Gleason Act of 2015	To amend title XVIII of the Social Security Act to provide Medicare beneficiary access to eye tracking accessories for speech generating devices and to remove the rental cap for durable medical equipment under the Medicare Program with respect to speech generating devices	Pub. L. 114–40 (text) (PDF)
114-41	July 31, 2015	Surface Transportation and Veterans Health Care Choice Improvement Act of 2015, with: VA Budget and Choice Improvement Act	To provide an extension of Federal-aid highway, highway safety, motor carrier safety, transit, and other programs funded out of the Highway Trust Fund, to provide resource flexibility to the Department of Veterans Affairs for health care services, and for other purposes	Pub. L. 114–41 (text) (PDF)
114-42	August 6, 2015	Notice of Observation Treatment and Implication for Care Eligibility Act	To amend title XVIII of the Social Security Act to require hospitals to provide certain notifications to individuals classified by such hospitals under observation status rather than admitted as inpatients of such hospitals	Pub. L. 114–42 (text) (PDF)
114-43	August 6, 2015	DHS IT Duplication Reduction Act of 2015	To reduce duplication of information technology at the Department of Homeland Security, and for other purposes	Pub. L. 114–43 (text) (PDF)
114-44	August 6, 2015	Need-Based Educational Aid Act of 2015	To improve and reauthorize provisions relating to the application of the antitrust laws to the award of need-based educational aid	Pub. L. 114–44 (text) (PDF)
114-45	August 7, 2015	Drinking Water Protection Act	To amend the Safe Drinking Water Act to provide for the assessment and management of the risk of algal toxins in drinking water, and for other purposes	Pub. L. 114–45 (text) (PDF)
114-46	August 7, 2015	Sawtooth National Recreation Area and Jerry Peak Wilderness Additions Act, with: Central Idaho Economic Development and Recreation Act	To establish certain wilderness areas in central Idaho and to authorize various land conveyances involving National Forest System land and Bureau of Land Management land in central Idaho, and for other purposes	Pub. L. 114–46 (text) (PDF)
114-47	August 7, 2015	Land Management Workforce Flexibility Act	To amend title 5, United States Code, to provide a pathway for temporary seasonal employees in Federal land management agencies to compete for vacant permanent positions under internal merit promotion procedures, and for other purposes	Pub. L. 114–47 (text) (PDF)
114-48	August 7, 2015	(No short title)	To designate the Federal building and United States courthouse located at 83 Meeting Street in Charleston, South Carolina, as the "J. Waties Waring Judicial Center"	Pub. L. 114–48 (text) (PDF)
114-49	August 7, 2015	(No short title)	To designate the "PFC Milton A. Lee Medal of Honor Memorial Highway" in the State of Texas	Pub. L. 114–49 (text) (PDF)
114-50	September 25, 2015	Gerardo Hernandez Airport Security Act of 2015	To improve intergovernmental planning for and communication during security incidents at domestic airports, and for other purposes	Pub. L. 114–50 (text) (PDF)
114-51	September 25, 2015	E-Warranty Act of 2015	To allow manufacturers to meet warranty and labeling requirements for consumer products by displaying the terms of warranties on Internet websites, and for other purposes	Pub. L. 114–51 (text) (PDF)
114-52	September 30, 2015	National Windstorm Impact Reduction Act Reauthorization of 2015	To reauthorize the National Windstorm Impact Reduction Program, and for other purposes.	Pub. L. 114–52 (text) (PDF)
114-53	September 30, 2015	TSA Office of Inspection Accountability Act of 2015 Continuing Appropriations Act, 2016	To require the Transportation Security Administration to conform to existing Federal law and regulations regarding criminal investigator positions, and for other purposes	Pub. L. 114–53 (text) (PDF)
114-54	September 30, 2015	Agriculture Reauthorizations Act of 2015	To amend the Agricultural Marketing Act of 1946 to extend the livestock mandatory price reporting requirements, and for other purposes	Pub. L. 114–54 (text) (PDF)
114-55	September 30, 2015	Airport and Airway Extension Act of 2015	To amend title 49, United States Code, to extend authorizations for the airport improvement program, to amend the Internal Revenue Code of 1986 to extend the funding and expenditure authority of the Airport and Airway Trust Fund, and for other purposes	Pub. L. 114–55 (text) (PDF)
114-56	September 30, 2015	(No short title)	To provide for the conveyance of certain property to the Yukon Kuskokwim Health Corporation located in Bethel, Alaska	Pub. L. 114–56 (text) (PDF)
114-57	September 30, 2015	New Mexico Navajo Water Settlement Technical Corrections Act	To make technical corrections to the Navajo water rights settlement in the State of New Mexico, and for other purposes	Pub. L. 114–57 (text) (PDF)
114-58	September 30, 2015	Department of Veterans Affairs Expiring Authorities Act of 2015	To amend title 38, United States Code, to extend certain expiring provisions of law administered by the Secretary of Veterans Affairs, and for other purposes	Pub. L. 114–58 (text) (PDF)
114-59	October 7, 2015	STEM Education Act of 2015	To define STEM education to include computer science, and to support existing STEM education programs at the National Science Foundation	Pub. L. 114–59 (text) (PDF)
114-60	October 7, 2015	Protecting Affordable Coverage for Employees Act	To amend title I of the Patient Protection and Affordable Care Act and title XXVII of the Public Health Service Act to revise the definition of small employer	Pub. L. 114–60 (text) (PDF)
114-61	October 7, 2015	(No short title)	To amend the Fair Minimum Wage Act of 2007 to reduce a scheduled increase in the minimum wage applicable to American Samoa	Pub. L. 114–61 (text) (PDF)
114-62	October 7, 2015	Gold Star Fathers Act of 2015	To amend chapter 21 of title 5, United States Code, to provide that fathers of certain permanently disabled or deceased veterans shall be included with mothers of such veterans as preference eligibles for treatment in the civil service	Pub. L. 114–62 (text) (PDF)
114-63	October 7, 2015	Ensuring Access to Clinical Trials Act of 2015	To permanently allow an exclusion under the Supplemental Security Income program and the Medicaid program for compensation provided to individuals who participate in clinical trials for rare diseases or conditions	Pub. L. 114–63 (text) (PDF)
114-64	October 7, 2015	(No short title)	To designate the United States courthouse located at 200 NW 4th Street in Oklahoma City, Oklahoma, as the William J. Holloway, Jr. United States Courthouse	Pub. L. 114–64 (text) (PDF)
114-65	October 7, 2015	Federal Vehicle Repair Cost Savings Act of 2015	To reduce the operation and maintenance costs associated with the Federal fleet by encouraging the use of remanufactured parts, and for other purposes	Pub. L. 114–65 (text) (PDF)
114-66	October 7, 2015	(No short title)	To designate the facility of the United States Postal Service located at 1 Walter Hammond Place in Waldwick, New Jersey, as the "Staff Sergeant Joseph D'Augustine Post Office Building"	Pub. L. 114–66 (text) (PDF)
114-67	October 7, 2015	(No short title)	To designate the Federal building located at 617 Walnut Street in Helena, Arkansas, as the "Jacob Trieber Federal Building, United States Post Office, and United States Court House"	Pub. L. 114–67 (text) (PDF)
114-68	October 16, 2015	Border Jobs for Veterans Act of 2015	To actively recruit members of the Armed Forces who are separating from military service to serve as Customs and Border Protection officers	Pub. L. 114–68 (text) (PDF)
114-69	October 16, 2015	Albuquerque Indian School Land Transfer Act	To require the Secretary of the Interior to take into trust 4 parcels of Federal land for the benefit of certain Indian Pueblos in the State of New Mexico	Pub. L. 114–69 (text) (PDF)
114-70	October 16, 2015	Adoptive Family Relief Act	To amend the section 221 of the Immigration and Nationality Act to provide relief for adoptive families from immigrant visa fees in certain situations	Pub. L. 114–70 (text) (PDF)
114-71	October 16, 2015	United States Commission on International Religious Freedom Reauthorization Act of 2015	To reauthorize the United States Commission on International Religious Freedom, and for other purposes	Pub. L. 114–71 (text) (PDF)
114-72	October 22, 2015	Quarterly Financial Report Reauthorization Act	To extend by 15 years the authority of the Secretary of Commerce to conduct the quarterly financial report program	Pub. L. 114–72 (text) (PDF)
114-73	October 29, 2015	Surface Transportation Extension Act of 2015, with: Positive Train Control Enforcement and Implementation Act of 2015	To provide an extension of Federal-aid highway, highway safety, motor carrier safety, transit, and other programs funded out of the Highway Trust Fund, and for other purposes	Pub. L. 114–73 (text) (PDF)
114-74	November 2, 2015	Bipartisan Budget Act of 2015, with: Federal Civil Penalties Inflation Adjustment Act Improvements Act of 2015, Social Security Benefit Protection and Opportunity Enhancement Act of 2015, Spectrum Pipeline Act of 2015	To amend the Internal Revenue Code of 1986 to provide for a right to an administrative appeal relating to adverse determinations of tax-exempt status of certain organizations	Pub. L. 114–74 (text) (PDF)
114-75	November 5, 2015	Wounded Warriors Federal Leave Act of 2015	To amend title 5, United States Code, to provide leave to any new Federal employee who is a veteran with a service-connected disability rated at 30 percent or more for purposes of undergoing medical treatment for such disability, and for other purposes	Pub. L. 114–75 (text) (PDF)
114-76	November 5, 2015	(No short title)	To designate the facility of the United States Postal Service located at 16105 Swingley Ridge Road in Chesterfield, Missouri, as the "Sgt. Zachary M. Fisher Post Office"	Pub. L. 114–76 (text) (PDF)
114-77	November 5, 2015	(No short title)	To designate the facility of the United States Postal Service located at 55 Grasso Plaza in St. Louis, Missouri, as the "Sgt. Amanda N. Pinson Post Office"	Pub. L. 114–77 (text) (PDF)
114-78	November 5, 2015	(No short title)	To designate the facility of the United States Postal Service located at 11662 Gravois Road in St. Louis, Missouri, as the "Lt. Daniel P. Riordan Post Office"	Pub. L. 114–78 (text) (PDF)
114-79	November 5, 2015	(No short title)	To designate the facility of the United States Postal Service located at 55 South Pioneer Boulevard in Springboro, Ohio, as the "Richard `Dick' Chenault Post Office Building"	Pub. L. 114–79 (text) (PDF)
114-80	November 5, 2015	DHS Social Media Improvement Act of 2015	To amend the Homeland Security Act of 2002 to authorize the Department of Homeland Security to establish a social media working group, and for other purposes	Pub. L. 114–80 (text) (PDF)
114-81	November 5, 2015	Illegal, Unreported, and Unregulated Fishing Enforcement Act of 2015, with: Antigua Convention Implementing Act of 2015, Port State Measures Agreement Act of 2015	To strengthen enforcement mechanisms to stop illegal, unreported, and unregulated fishing, to amend the Tuna Conventions Act of 1950 to implement the Antigua Convention, and for other purposes	Pub. L. 114–81 (text) (PDF)
114-82	November 5, 2015	(No short title)	To designate the facility of the United States Postal Service located at 90 Cornell Street in Kingston, New York, as the "Staff Sergeant Robert H. Dietz Post Office Building"	Pub. L. 114–82 (text) (PDF)
114-83	November 5, 2015	(No short title)	To designate the facility of the United States Postal Service located at 206 West Commercial Street in East Rochester, New York, as the "Officer Daryl R. Pierson Memorial Post Office Building"	Pub. L. 114–83 (text) (PDF)
114-84	November 5, 2015	(No short title)	To designate the facility of the United States Postal Service located at 4500 SE 28th Street, Del City, Oklahoma, as the James Robert Kalsu Post Office Building	Pub. L. 114–84 (text) (PDF)
114-85	November 5, 2015	(No short title)	To amend title XI of the Social Security Act to clarify waiver authority regarding programs of all-inclusive care for the elderly (PACE programs)	Pub. L. 114–85 (text) (PDF)
114-86	November 5, 2015	Librarian of Congress Succession Modernization Act of 2015	To establish a 10-year term for the service of the Librarian of Congress	Pub. L. 114–86 (text) (PDF)
114-87	November 20, 2015	Surface Transportation Extension Act of 2015, Part II	To provide an extension of Federal-aid highway, highway safety, motor carrier safety, transit, and other programs funded out of the Highway Trust Fund, and for other purposes	Pub. L. 114–87 (text) (PDF)
114-88	November 25, 2015	Recovery Improvements for Small Entities After Disaster Act of 2015, with: Superstorm Sandy Relief and Disaster Loan Program Improvement Act of 2015	To improve the disaster assistance programs of the Small Business Administration	Pub. L. 114–88 (text) (PDF)
114-89	November 25, 2015	Improving Regulatory Transparency for New Medical Therapies Act	To amend the Controlled Substances Act with respect to drug scheduling recommendations by the Secretary of Health and Human Services, and with respect to registration of manufacturers and distributors seeking to conduct clinical testing	Pub. L. 114–89 (text) (PDF)
114-90	November 25, 2015	U.S. Commercial Space Launch Competitiveness Act, with: Spurring Private Aerospace Competitiveness and Entrepreneurship Act of 2015, Space Resource Exploration and Utilization Act of 2015	To facilitate a pro-growth environment for the developing commercial space industry by encouraging private sector investment and creating more stable and predictable regulatory conditions, and for other purposes	Pub. L. 114–90 (text) (PDF)
114-91	November 25, 2015	Protecting Our Infants Act of 2015	To address problems related to prenatal opioid use	Pub. L. 114–91 (text) (PDF)
114-92	November 25, 2015	National Defense Authorization Act for Fiscal Year 2016, with: Military Construction Authorization Act for Fiscal Year 2016	To authorize appropriations for fiscal year 2016 for military activities of the Department of Defense, for military construction, and for defense activities of the Department of Energy, to prescribe military personnel strengths for such fiscal year, and for other purposes	Pub. L. 114–92 (text) (PDF)
114-93	November 25, 2015	Equity in Government Compensation Act of 2015	To suspend the current compensation packages for the chief executive officers of Fannie Mae and Freddie Mac, and for other purposes	Pub. L. 114–93 (text) (PDF)
114-94	December 4, 2015	Fixing America's Surface Transportation Act, with: Federal Public Transportation Act of 2015, Transportation for Tomorrow Act of 2015, Hazardous Materials Transportation Safety Improvement Act of 2015, Passenger Rail Reform and Investment Act of 2015, Track, Railroad, and Infrastructure Network Act, Railroad Infrastructure Financing Improvement Act, Raechel and Jacqueline Houck Safe Rental Car Act of 2015, Driver Privacy Act of 2015, Safety Through Informed Consumers Act of 2015, Tire Efficiency, Safety, and Registration Act of 2015, Motor Vehicle Safety Whistleblower Act, Export-Import Bank Reform and Reauthorization Act of 2015, State Licensing Efficiency Act of 2015, Helping Expand Lending Practices in Rural Communities Act of 2015	To authorize funds for Federal-aid highways, highway safety programs, and transit programs, and for other purposes	Pub. L. 114–94 (text) (PDF)
114-95	December 10, 2015	Every Student Succeeds Act	To reauthorize the Elementary and Secondary Education Act of 1965 to ensure that every child achieves	Pub. L. 114–95 (text) (PDF)
114-96	December 11, 2015	Further Continuing Appropriations Act, 2016	Further Continuing Appropriations Act, 2016	Pub. L. 114–96 (text) (PDF)
114-97	December 11, 2015	Improving Access to Emergency Psychiatric Care Act	To extend and expand the Medicaid emergency psychiatric demonstration project	Pub. L. 114–97 (text) (PDF)
114-98	December 11, 2015	Grassroots Rural and Small Community Water Systems Assistance Act	To amend the Safe Drinking Water Act to reauthorize technical assistance to small public water systems, and for other purposes	Pub. L. 114–98 (text) (PDF)
114-99	December 11, 2015	Breast Cancer Research Stamp Reauthorization Act of 2015	To amend title 39, United States Code, to extend the authority of the United States Postal Service to issue a semipostal to raise funds for breast cancer research, and for other purposes	Pub. L. 114–99 (text) (PDF)
114-100	December 16, 2015	(No short title)	Making further continuing appropriations for fiscal year 2016, and for other purposes	Pub. L. 114–100 (text) (PDF)
114-101	December 18, 2015	Billy Frank Jr. Tell Your Story Act	To redesignate the Nisqually National Wildlife Refuge, located in the State of Washington, as the Billy Frank Jr. Nisqually National Wildlife Refuge, to establish the Medicine Creek Treaty National Memorial within the wildlife refuge, and for other purposes	Pub. L. 114–101 (text) (PDF)
114-102	December 18, 2015	Hizballah International Financing Prevention Act of 2015	To prevent Hizballah and associated entities from gaining access to international financial and other institutions, and for other purposes	Pub. L. 114–102 (text) (PDF)
114-103	December 18, 2015	(No short title)	To designate the arboretum at the Hunter Holmes McGuire VA Medical Center in Richmond, Virginia, as the "Phyllis E. Galanti Arboretum"	Pub. L. 114–103 (text) (PDF)
114-104	December 18, 2015	Stem Cell Therapeutic and Research Reauthorization Act of 2015	To reauthorize the Stem Cell Therapeutic and Research Act of 2005, and for other purposes	Pub. L. 114–104 (text) (PDF)
114-105	December 18, 2015	Federal Perkins Loan Program Extension Act of 2015	To extend temporarily the Federal Perkins Loan program, and for other purposes	Pub. L. 114–105 (text) (PDF)
114-106	December 18, 2015	Securing Fairness in Regulatory Timing Act of 2015	To amend title XVIII of the Social Security Act to extend the annual comment period for payment rates under Medicare Advantage	Pub. L. 114–106 (text) (PDF)
114-107	December 18, 2015	National Guard and Reservist Debt Relief Extension Act of 2015	To exempt for an additional 4-year period, from the application of the means-test presumption of abuse under chapter 7, qualifying members of reserve components of the Armed Forces and members of the National Guard who, after September 11, 2001, are called to active duty or to perform a homeland defense activity for not less than 90 days	Pub. L. 114–107 (text) (PDF)
114-108	December 18, 2015	(No short title)	Appointing the day for the convening of the second session of the One Hundred Fourteenth Congress	Pub. L. 114–108 (text) (PDF)
114-109	December 18, 2015	Federal Improper Payments Coordination Act of 2015	To provide access to and use of information by Federal agencies in order to reduce improper payments, and for other purposes	Pub. L. 114–109 (text) (PDF)
114-110	December 18, 2015	Surface Transportation Board Reauthorization Act of 2015	To establish the Surface Transportation Board as an independent establishment, and for other purposes	Pub. L. 114–110 (text) (PDF)
114-111	December 18, 2015	Emergency Information Improvement Act of 2015	To amend the Robert T. Stafford Disaster Relief and Emergency Assistance Act to provide eligibility for broadcasting facilities to receive certain disaster assistance, and for other purposes	Pub. L. 114–111 (text) (PDF)
114-112	December 18, 2015	(No short title)	To provide for the extension of the enforcement instruction on supervision requirements for outpatient therapeutic services in critical access and small rural hospitals through 2015	Pub. L. 114–112 (text) (PDF)
114-113	December 18, 2015	Consolidated Appropriations Act, 2016, with: Agriculture, Rural Development, Food and Drug Administration, and Related Agencies Appropriations Act, 2016, Department of Commerce Appropriations Act, 2016, Department of Justice Appropriations Act, 2016, Science Appropriations Act, 2016, Commerce, Justice, Science, and Related Agencies Appropriations Act, 2016, Department of Defense Appropriations Act, 2016, Energy and Water Development and Related Agencies Appropriations Act, 2016, Department of the Treasury Appropriations Act, 2016, Executive Office of the President Appropriations Act, 2016, Judiciary Appropriations Act, 2016, District of Columbia Appropriations Act, 2016, D.C. Opportunity Scholarship Program School Certification Requirements Act, Financial Services and General Government Appropriations Act, 2016, Department of Homeland Security Appropriations Act, 2016, Department of the Interior, Environment, and Related Agencies Appropriations Act, 2016, Department of Labor Appropriations Act, 2016, Department of Health and Human Services Appropriations Act, 2016, Department of Education Appropriations Act, 2016, Departments of Labor, Health and Human Services, and Education, and Related Agencies Appropriations Act, 2016, Legislative Branch Appropriations Act, 2016, Military Construction, Veterans Affairs, and Related Agencies Appropriations Act, 2016, Department of State, Foreign Operations, and Related Programs Appropriations Act, 2016, Department of Transportation Appropriations Act, 2016, Department of Housing and Urban Development Appropriations Act, 2016, Transportation, Housing and Urban Development, and Related Agencies Appropriations Act, 2016, Intelligence Authorization Act for Fiscal Year 2016, Cybersecurity Act of 2015, Cybersecurity Information Sharing Act of 2015, National Cybersecurity Protection Advancement Act of 2015, Federal Cybersecurity Enhancement Act of 2015, Federal Cybersecurity Workforce Assessment Act of 2015, Visa Waiver Program Improvement and Terrorist Travel Prevention Act of 2015, James Zadroga 9/11 Health and Compensation Reauthorization Act, James Zadroga 9/11 Victim Compensation Fund Reauthorization Act, Justice for United States Victims of State Sponsored Terrorism Act, National Oceans and Coastal Security Act, Protecting Americans from Tax Hikes Act of 2015	Making appropriations for military construction, the Department of Veterans Affairs, and related agencies for the fiscal year ending September 30, 2016, and for other purposes	Pub. L. 114–113 (text) (PDF)
114-114	December 28, 2015	Microbead-Free Waters Act of 2015	To amend the Federal Food, Drug, and Cosmetic Act to prohibit the manufacture and introduction or delivery for introduction into interstate commerce of rinse-off cosmetics containing intentionally- added plastic microbeads	Pub. L. 114–114 (text) (PDF)
114-115	December 28, 2015	Patient Access and Medicare Protection Act	To amend titles XVIII and XIX of the Social Security Act to improve payments for complex rehabilitation technology and certain radiation therapy services, to ensure flexibility in applying the hardship exception for meaningful use for the 2015 EHR reporting period for 2017 payment adjustments, and for other purposes	Pub. L. 114–115 (text) (PDF)
114-116	January 28, 2016	Child Nicotine Poisoning Prevention Act of 2015	To require special packaging for liquid nicotine containers, and for other purposes	Pub. L. 114–116 (text) (PDF)
114-117	January 28, 2016	Grants Oversight and New Efficiency Act	To close out expired grants	Pub. L. 114–117 (text) (PDF)
114-118	January 28, 2016	District of Columbia Courts, Public Defender Service, and Court Services and Offender Supervision Agency Act of 2015	To revise certain authorities of the District of Columbia courts, the Court Services and Offender Supervision Agency for the District of Columbia, and the Public Defender Service for the District of Columbia, and for other purposes	Pub. L. 114–118 (text) (PDF)
114-119	February 8, 2016	International Megan's Law to Prevent Child Exploitation and Other Sexual Crimes Through Advanced Notification of Traveling Sex Offenders	To protect children and others from sexual abuse and exploitation, including sex trafficking and sex tourism, by providing advance notice of intended travel by registered sex offenders outside the United States to the government of the country of destination, requesting foreign governments to notify the United States when a known sex offender is seeking to enter the United States, and for other purposes	Pub. L. 114–119 (text) (PDF)
114-120	February 8, 2016	Coast Guard Authorization Act of 2015, with: Pribilof Island Transition Completion Act of 2015	To authorize appropriations for the Coast Guard for fiscal years 2016 and 2017, and for other purposes	Pub. L. 114–120 (text) (PDF)
114-121	February 8, 2016	Electrify Africa Act of 2015	To establish a comprehensive United States Government policy to encourage the efforts of countries in sub-Saharan Africa to develop an appropriate mix of power solutions, including renewable energy, for more broadly distributed electricity access in order to support poverty reduction, promote development outcomes, and drive economic growth, and for other purposes	Pub. L. 114–121 (text) (PDF)
114-122	February 18, 2016	North Korea Sanctions and Policy Enhancement Act of 2016	To improve the enforcement of sanctions against the Government of North Korea, and for other purposes	Pub. L. 114–122 (text) (PDF)
114-123	February 18, 2016	United States-Jordan Defense Cooperation Act of 2015	To improve defense cooperation between the United States and the Hashemite Kingdom of Jordan	Pub. L. 114–123 (text) (PDF)
114-124	February 18, 2016	Research Excellence and Advancements for Dyslexia Act	To require the President's annual budget request to Congress each year to include a line item for the Research in Disabilities Education program of the National Science Foundation and to require the National Science Foundation to conduct research on dyslexia	Pub. L. 114–124 (text) (PDF)
114-125	February 24, 2016	Trade Facilitation and Trade Enforcement Act of 2015, with: Enforce and Protect Act of 2015, Small Business Trade Enhancement Act of 2015 or State Trade Coordination Act, U.S. Customs and Border Protection Authorization Act, Preclearance Authorization Act of 2015	To reauthorize trade facilitation and trade enforcement functions and activities, and for other purposes	Pub. L. 114–125 (text) (PDF)
114-126	February 24, 2016	Judicial Redress Act of 2015	To extend Privacy Act remedies to citizens of certified states, and for other purposes	Pub. L. 114–126 (text) (PDF)
114-127	February 29, 2016	(No short title)	To allow the Miami Tribe of Oklahoma to lease or transfer certain lands	Pub. L. 114–127 (text) (PDF)
114-128	February 29, 2016	(No short title)	To revise the boundaries of certain John H. Chafee Coastal Barrier Resources System units in Florida	Pub. L. 114–128 (text) (PDF)
114-129	February 29, 2016	(No short title)	To provide for the conveyance of land of the Illiana Health Care System of the Department of Veterans Affairs in Danville, Illinois	Pub. L. 114–129 (text) (PDF)
114-130	February 29, 2016	(No short title)	To direct the Secretary of Veterans Affairs to convey to the Florida Department of Veterans Affairs all right, title, and interest of the United States to the property known as "The Community Living Center" at the Lake Baldwin Veterans Affairs Outpatient Clinic, Orlando, Florida	Pub. L. 114–130 (text) (PDF)
114-131	February 29, 2016	(No short title)	To extend the deadline for the submittal of the final report required by the Commission on Care	Pub. L. 114–131 (text) (PDF)
114-132	February 29, 2016	Directing Dollars to Disaster Relief Act of 2015	To direct the Administrator of the Federal Emergency Management Agency to develop an integrated plan to reduce administrative costs under the Robert T. Stafford Disaster Relief and Emergency Assistance Act, and for other purposes	Pub. L. 114–132 (text) (PDF)
114-133	March 9, 2016	Eric Williams Correctional Officer Protection Act of 2015	To amend title 18, United States Code, to authorize the Director of the Bureau of Prisons to issue oleoresin capsicum spray to officers and employees of the Bureau of Prisons	Pub. L. 114–133 (text) (PDF)
114-134	March 9, 2016	(No short title)	To designate the facility of the United States Postal Service located at 2082 Stringtown Road in Grove City, Ohio, as the "Specialist Joseph W. Riley Post Office Building"	Pub. L. 114–134 (text) (PDF)
114-135	March 18, 2016	(No short title)	To amend title 36, United States Code, to make certain improvements in the congressional charter of the Disabled American Veterans	Pub. L. 114–135 (text) (PDF)
114-136	March 18, 2016	Edward 'Ted' Kaufman and Michael Leavitt Presidential Transitions Improvements Act of 2015	To improve the process of presidential transition	Pub. L. 114–136 (text) (PDF)
114-137	March 18, 2016	Competitive Service Act of 2015	To allow additional appointing authorities to select individuals from competitive service certificates	Pub. L. 114–137 (text) (PDF)
114-138	March 18, 2016	(No short title)	To designate the facility of the United States Postal Service located at 99 West 2nd Street in Fond du Lac, Wisconsin, as the Lieutenant Colonel James "Maggie" Megellas Post Office	Pub. L. 114–138 (text) (PDF)
114-139	March 18, 2016	(No short title)	To direct the Secretary of State to develop a strategy to obtain observer status for Taiwan in the International Criminal Police Organization, and for other purposes	Pub. L. 114–139 (text) (PDF)
114-140	March 30, 2016	Evidence-Based Policymaking Commission Act of 2016	To establish the Commission on Evidence-Based Policymaking, and for other purposes	Pub. L. 114–140 (text) (PDF)
114-141	March 30, 2016	Airport and Airway Extension Act of 2016	To amend title 49, United States Code, to extend authorizations for the airport improvement program, to amend the Internal Revenue Code of 1986 to extend the funding and expenditure authority of the Airport and Airway Trust Fund, and for other purposes	Pub. L. 114–141 (text) (PDF)
114-142	March 31, 2016	Foreclosure Relief and Extension for Servicemembers Act of 2015	To extend temporarily the extended period of protection for members of uniformed services relating to mortgages, mortgage foreclosure, and eviction, and for other purposes	Pub. L. 114–142 (text) (PDF)
114-143	April 11, 2016	Integrated Public Alert and Warning System Modernization Act of 2015	To amend the Homeland Security Act of 2002 to direct the Administrator of the Federal Emergency Management Agency to modernize the integrated public alert and warning system of the United States, and for other purposes	Pub. L. 114–143 (text) (PDF)
114-144	April 19, 2016	Older Americans Act Reauthorization Act of 2016	To reauthorize the Older Americans Act of 1965, and for other purposes	Pub. L. 114–144 (text) (PDF)
114-145	April 19, 2016	Ensuring Patient Access and Effective Drug Enforcement Act of 2016	To improve enforcement efforts related to prescription drug diversion and abuse, and for other purposes	Pub. L. 114–145 (text) (PDF)
114-146	April 19, 2016	Adding Zika Virus to the FDA Priority Review Voucher Program Act	To expand the tropical disease product priority review voucher program to encourage treatments for Zika virus	Pub. L. 114–146 (text) (PDF)
114-147	April 29, 2016	National POW/MIA Remembrance Act of 2015	To direct the Architect of the Capitol to place in the United States Capitol a chair honoring American Prisoners of War/Missing in Action	Pub. L. 114–147 (text) (PDF)
114-148	April 29, 2016	Breast Cancer Awareness Commemorative Coin Act	To require the Secretary of the Treasury to mint coins in recognition of the fight against breast cancer	Pub. L. 114–148 (text) (PDF)
114-149	April 29, 2016	(No short title)	To rename the Armed Forces Reserve Center in Great Falls, Montana, the Captain John E. Moran and Captain William Wylie Galt Armed Forces Reserve Center	Pub. L. 114–149 (text) (PDF)
114-150	April 29, 2016	Department of Homeland Security Headquarters Consolidation Accountability Act of 2015	To direct the Secretary of Homeland Security to submit to Congress information on the Department of Homeland Security headquarters consolidation project in the National Capital Region, and for other purposes	Pub. L. 114–150 (text) (PDF)
114-151	May 9, 2016	Protect and Preserve International Cultural Property Act	To protect and preserve international cultural property at risk due to political instability, armed conflict, or natural or other disasters, and for other purposes	Pub. L. 114–151 (text) (PDF)
114-152	May 9, 2016	National Bison Legacy Act	To adopt the bison as the national mammal of the United States	Pub. L. 114–152 (text) (PDF)
114-153	May 11, 2016	Defend Trade Secrets Act of 2016	To amend chapter 90 of title 18, United States Code, to provide Federal jurisdiction for the theft of trade secrets, and for other purposes	Pub. L. 114–153 (text) (PDF)
114-154	May 16, 2016	Transnational Drug Trafficking Act of 2015	To provide the Department of Justice with additional tools to target extraterritorial drug trafficking activity, and for other purposes	Pub. L. 114–154 (text) (PDF)
114-155	May 16, 2016	Bulletproof Vest Partnership Grant Program Reauthorization Act of 2015	To amend title I of the Omnibus Crime Control and Safe Streets Act of 1968 to extend the authorization of the Bulletproof Vest Partnership Grant Program through fiscal year 2020, and for other purposes	Pub. L. 114–155 (text) (PDF)
114-156	May 16, 2016	Fallen Heroes Flag Act of 2016	To provide Capitol-flown flags to the immediate family of firefighters, law enforcement officers, members of rescue squads or ambulance crews, and public safety officers who are killed in the line of duty	Pub. L. 114–156 (text) (PDF)
114-157	May 20, 2016	(No short title)	To amend the Department of Energy Organization Act and the Local Public Works Capital Development and Investment Act of 1976 to modernize terms relating to minorities	Pub. L. 114–157 (text) (PDF)
114-158	May 20, 2016	(No short title)	To amend title 38, United States Code, to provide for the inurnment in Arlington National Cemetery of the cremated remains of certain persons whose service has been determined to be active service	Pub. L. 114–158 (text) (PDF)
114-159	May 20, 2016	American Manufacturing Competitiveness Act of 2016	To establish a process for the submission and consideration of petitions for temporary duty suspensions and reductions, and for other purposes	Pub. L. 114–159 (text) (PDF)
114-160	May 20, 2016	(No short title)	To designate the Federal building located at 99 New York Avenue, N.E., in the District of Columbia as the "Ariel Rios Federal Building"	Pub. L. 114–160 (text) (PDF)
114-161	May 20, 2016	(No short title)	To direct the Administrator of General Services, on behalf of the Archivist of the United States, to convey certain Federal property located in the State of Alaska to the Municipality of Anchorage, Alaska	Pub. L. 114–161 (text) (PDF)
114-162	May 20, 2016	(No short title)	To amend the Federal Water Pollution Control Act to reauthorize the National Estuary Program, and for other purposes	Pub. L. 114–162 (text) (PDF)
114-163	May 20, 2016	(No short title)	To provide for the authority for the successors and assigns of the Starr-Camargo Bridge Company to maintain and operate a toll bridge across the Rio Grande near Rio Grande City, Texas, and for other purposes	Pub. L. 114–163 (text) (PDF)
114-164	June 3, 2016	(No short title)	To name the Department of Veterans Affairs community-based outpatient clinic in Sevierville, Tennessee, the Dannie A. Carr Veterans Outpatient Clinic	Pub. L. 114–164 (text) (PDF)
114-165	June 3, 2016	Native American Children's Safety Act	To amend the Indian Child Protection and Family Violence Prevention Act to require background checks before foster care placements are ordered in tribal court proceedings, and for other purposes	Pub. L. 114–165 (text) (PDF)
114-166	June 13, 2016	(No short title)	To designate the facility of the United States Postal Service located at 1103 USPS Building 1103 in Camp Pendleton, California, as the "Camp Pendleton Medal of Honor Post Office"	Pub. L. 114–166 (text) (PDF)
114-167	June 13, 2016	(No short title)	To designate the facility of the United States Postal Service located at 523 East Railroad Street in Knox, Pennsylvania, as the "Specialist Ross A. McGinnis Memorial Post Office"	Pub. L. 114–167 (text) (PDF)
114-168	June 13, 2016	(No short title)	To designate the facility of the United States Postal Service located at 1048 West Robinhood Drive in Stockton, California, as the "W. Ronald Coale Memorial Post Office Building"	Pub. L. 114–168 (text) (PDF)
114-169	June 13, 2016	(No short title)	To designate the facility of the United States Postal Service located at 5351 Lapalco Boulevard in Marrero, Louisiana, as the "Lionel R. Collins, Sr. Post Office Building"	Pub. L. 114–169 (text) (PDF)
114-170	June 13, 2016	(No short title)	To designate the facility of the United States Postal Service located at 201 B Street in Perryville, Arkansas, as the "Harold George Bennett Post Office"	Pub. L. 114–170 (text) (PDF)
114-171	June 13, 2016	(No short title)	To designate the facility of the United States Postal Service located at 5919 Chef Menteur Highway in New Orleans, Louisiana, as the "Daryle Holloway Post Office Building"	Pub. L. 114–171 (text) (PDF)
114-172	June 13, 2016	(No short title)	To designate the facility of the United States Postal Service located at 4567 Rockbridge Road in Pine Lake, Georgia, as the "Francis Manuel Ortega Post Office"	Pub. L. 114–172 (text) (PDF)
114-173	June 13, 2016	(No short title)	To designate the facility of the United States Postal Service located at 7715 Post Road, North Kingstown, Rhode Island, as the "Melvoid J. Benson Post Office Building"	Pub. L. 114–173 (text) (PDF)
114-174	June 13, 2016	(No short title)	To designate the facility of the United States Postal Service located at 200 Town Run Lane in Winston-Salem, North Carolina, as the "Maya Angelou Memorial Post Office"	Pub. L. 114–174 (text) (PDF)
114-175	June 13, 2016	(No short title)	To designate the facility of the United States Postal Service located at 1265 Hurffville Road in Deptford Township, New Jersey, as the "First Lieutenant Salvatore S. Corma II Post Office Building"	Pub. L. 114–175 (text) (PDF)
114-176	June 13, 2016	(No short title)	To designate the facility of the United States Postal Service located at 220 East Oak Street, Glenwood City, Wisconsin, as the Second Lt. Ellen Ainsworth Memorial Post Office	Pub. L. 114–176 (text) (PDF)
114-177	June 13, 2016	(No short title)	To designate the facility of the United States Postal Service located at 615 6th Avenue SE in Cedar Rapids, Iowa as the "Sgt. 1st Class Terryl L. Pasker Post Office Building"	Pub. L. 114–177 (text) (PDF)
114-178	June 22, 2016	Indian Trust Asset Reform Act	To provide for Indian trust asset management reform, and for other purposes	Pub. L. 114–178 (text) (PDF)
114-179	June 22, 2016	(No short title)	To name the Department of Veterans Affairs community-based outpatient clinic in The Dalles, Oregon, as the "Loren R. Kaufman VA Clinic"	Pub. L. 114–179 (text) (PDF)
114-180	June 22, 2016	Federal Law Enforcement Self-Defense and Protection Act of 2015	To ensure Federal law enforcement officers remain able to ensure their own safety, and the safety of their families, during a covered furlough	Pub. L. 114–180 (text) (PDF)
114-181	June 22, 2016	(No short title)	To take certain Federal lands located in Lassen County, California, into trust for the benefit of the Susanville Indian Rancheria, and for other purposes	Pub. L. 114–181 (text) (PDF)
114-182	June 22, 2016	Frank R. Lautenberg Chemical Safety for the 21st Century Act, with: Rural Healthcare Connectivity Act of 2016	To modernize the Toxic Substances Control Act, and for other purposes	Pub. L. 114–182 (text) (PDF)
114-183	June 22, 2016	Protecting our Infrastructure of Pipelines and Enhancing Safety Act of 2016	To amend title 49, United States Code, to provide enhanced safety in pipeline transportation, and for other purposes	Pub. L. 114–183 (text) (PDF)
114-184	June 30, 2016	Recovering Missing Children Act	To amend the Internal Revenue Code of 1986 to permit the disclosure of certain tax return information for the purpose of missing or exploited children investigations	Pub. L. 114–184 (text) (PDF)
114-185	June 30, 2016	FOIA Improvement Act of 2016	To improve the Freedom of Information Act	Pub. L. 114–185 (text) (PDF)
114-186	June 30, 2016	Fraud Reduction and Data Analytics Act of 2015	To improve Federal agency financial and administrative controls and procedures to assess and mitigate fraud risks, and to improve Federal agencies' development and use of data analytics for the purpose of identifying, preventing, and responding to fraud, including improper payments	Pub. L. 114–186 (text) (PDF)
114-187	June 30, 2016	Puerto Rico Oversight, Management, and Economic Stability Act	To reauthorize and amend the National Sea Grant College Program Act, and for other purposes	Pub. L. 114–187 (text) (PDF)
114-188	June 30, 2016	Female Veteran Suicide Prevention Act	To direct the Secretary of Veterans Affairs to identify mental health care and suicide prevention programs and metrics that are effective in treating women veterans as part of the evaluation of such programs by the Secretary, and for other purposes	Pub. L. 114–188 (text) (PDF)
114-189	July 6, 2016	(No short title)	To provide funds to the Army Corps of Engineers to hire veterans and members of the Armed Forces to assist the Corps with curation and historic preservation activities, and for other purposes	
114-190	July 15, 2016	FAA Extension, Safety, and Security Act of 2016, with: Aviation Security Act of 2016	To amend title 49, United States Code, to extend authorizations for the airport improvement program, to amend the Internal Revenue Code of 1986 to extend the funding and expenditure authority of the Airport and Airway Trust Fund, and for other purposes	Pub. L. 114–190 (text) (PDF)
114-191	July 15, 2016	Foreign Aid Transparency and Accountability Act of 2016	To direct the President to establish guidelines for covered United States foreign assistance programs, and for other purposes	Pub. L. 114–191 (text) (PDF)
114-192	July 15, 2016	(No short title)	To designate the facility of the United States Postal Service located at 15 Rochester Street, Bergen, New York, as the Barry G. Miller Post Office	Pub. L. 114–192 (text) (PDF)
114-193	July 15, 2016	(No short title)	To designate the facility of the United States Postal Service located at 525 N Broadway in Aurora, Illinois, as the "Kenneth M. Christy Post Office Building"	Pub. L. 114–193 (text) (PDF)
114-194	July 15, 2016	Venezuela Defense of Human Rights and Civil Society Extension Act of 2016	To extend the termination of sanctions with respect to Venezuela under the Venezuela Defense of Human Rights and Civil Society Act of 2014	Pub. L. 114–194 (text) (PDF)
114-195	July 20, 2016	Global Food Security Act of 2016	To authorize a comprehensive strategic approach for United States foreign assistance to developing countries to reduce global poverty and hunger, achieve food and nutrition security, promote inclusive, sustainable, agricultural-led economic growth, improve nutritional outcomes, especially for women and children, build resilience among vulnerable populations, and for other purposes	Pub. L. 114–195 (text) (PDF)
114-196	July 22, 2016	United States Semiquincentennial Commission Act of 2016	To establish the United States Semiquincentennial Commission, and for other purposes	Pub. L. 114–196 (text) (PDF)
114-197	July 22, 2016	Veterans' Compensation COLA Act of 2016	To increase, effective as of December 1, 2016, the rates of compensation for veterans with service-connected disabilities and the rates of dependency and indemnity compensation for the survivors of certain disabled veterans, and for other purposes	Pub. L. 114–197 (text) (PDF)
114-198	July 22, 2016	Comprehensive Addiction and Recovery Act of 2016, with: Jason Simcakoski Memorial and Promise Act	To authorize the Attorney General and Secretary of Health and Human Services to award grants to address the prescription opioid abuse and heroin use crisis, and for other purposes	Pub. L. 114–198 (text) (PDF)
114-199	July 22, 2016	Protecting Our Lives by Initiating COPS Expansion Act of 2016	To amend the Omnibus Crime Control and Safe Streets Act of 1968 to authorize COPS grantees to use grant funds for active shooter training, and for other purposes	Pub. L. 114–199 (text) (PDF)
114-200	July 29, 2016	(No short title)	To designate the facility of the United States Postal Service located at 7802 37th Avenue in Jackson Heights, New York, as the "Jeanne and Jules Manford Post Office Building"	Pub. L. 114–200 (text) (PDF)
114-201	July 29, 2016	Housing Opportunity Through Modernization Act of 2016	To provide housing opportunities in the United States through modernization of various housing programs, and for other purposes	Pub. L. 114–201 (text) (PDF)
114-202	July 29, 2016	(No short title)	To designate the facility of the United States Postal Service located at 620 Central Avenue Suite 1A in Hot Springs National Park, Arkansas, as the "Chief Petty Officer Adam Brown United States Post Office"	Pub. L. 114–202 (text) (PDF)
114-203	July 29, 2016	(No short title)	To designate the facility of the United States Postal Service located at 4122 Madison Street, Elfers, Florida, as the "Private First Class Felton Roger Fussell Memorial Post Office"	Pub. L. 114–203 (text) (PDF)
114-204	July 29, 2016	(No short title)	To designate the facility of the United States Postal Service located at 522 North Central Avenue in Phoenix, Arizona, as the "Ed Pastor Post Office"	Pub. L. 114–204 (text) (PDF)
114-205	July 29, 2016	(No short title)	To designate the facility of the United States Postal Service located at 110 East Powerhouse Road in Collegeville, Minnesota, as the "Eugene J. McCarthy Post Office"	Pub. L. 114–205 (text) (PDF)
114-206	July 29, 2016	(No short title)	To designate the facility of the United States Postal Service located at 6691 Church Street in Riverdale, Georgia, as the "Major Gregory E. Barney Post Office Building"	Pub. L. 114–206 (text) (PDF)
114-207	July 29, 2016	(No short title)	To designate the facility of the United States Postal Service located at 61 South Baldwin Avenue in Sierra Madre, California, as the "Louis Van Iersel Post Office"	Pub. L. 114–207 (text) (PDF)
114-208	July 29, 2016	(No short title)	To designate the facility of the United States Postal Service located at 1301 Alabama Avenue in Selma, Alabama as the "Amelia Boynton Robinson Post Office Building"	Pub. L. 114–208 (text) (PDF)
114-209	July 29, 2016	(No short title)	To designate the facility of the United States Postal Service located at 3130 Grants Lake Boulevard in Sugar Land, Texas, as the "LCpl Garrett W. Gamble, USMC Post Office Building"	Pub. L. 114–209 (text) (PDF)
114-210	July 29, 2016	Making Electronic Government Accountable By Yielding Tangible Efficiencies Act of 2016	To require the Director of the Office of Management and Budget to issue a directive on the management of software licenses, and for other purposes	Pub. L. 114–210 (text) (PDF)
114-211	July 29, 2016	(No short title)	To designate the facility of the United States Postal Service located at 229 West Main Cross Street, in Findlay, Ohio, as the "Michael Garver Oxley Memorial Post Office Building"	Pub. L. 114–211 (text) (PDF)
114-212	July 29, 2016	(No short title)	To designate the facility of the United States Postal Service located at 5720 South 142nd Street in Omaha, Nebraska, as the "Petty Officer 1st Class Caleb A. Nelson Post Office Building"	Pub. L. 114–212 (text) (PDF)
114-213	July 29, 2016	(No short title)	To designate the facility of the United States Postal Service located at 3957 2nd Avenue in Laurel Hill, Florida, as the "Sergeant First Class William 'Kelly' Lacey Post Office"	Pub. L. 114–213 (text) (PDF)
114-214	July 29, 2016	(No short title)	To designate the facility of the United States Postal Service located at 10721 E Jefferson Ave in Detroit, Michigan, as the "Mary E. McCoy Post Office Building"	Pub. L. 114–214 (text) (PDF)
114-215	July 29, 2016	John F. Kennedy Centennial Commission Act	To establish the John F. Kennedy Centennial Commission	Pub. L. 114–215 (text) (PDF)
114-216	July 29, 2016	(No short title)	To reauthorize and amend the National Sea Grant College Program Act, and for other purposes	Pub. L. 114–216 (text) (PDF)
114-217	July 29, 2016	Library of Congress Sound Recording and Film Preservation Programs Reauthorization Act of 2016	To reauthorize the sound recording and film preservation programs of the Library of Congress, and for other purposes	Pub. L. 114–217 (text) (PDF)
114-218	July 29, 2016	Department of Veterans Affairs Dental Insurance Reauthorization Act of 2016	To amend title 38, United States Code, to provide a dental insurance plan to veterans and survivors and dependents of veterans	Pub. L. 114–218 (text) (PDF)
114-219	July 29, 2016	(No short title)	To authorize the National Library Service for the Blind and Physically Handicapped to provide playback equipment in all formats	Pub. L. 114–219 (text) (PDF)
114-220	September 23, 2016	(No short title)	To designate the Department of Veterans Affairs community-based outpatient clinic in Laughlin, Nevada, as the "Master Chief Petty Officer Jesse Dean VA Clinic"	Pub. L. 114–220 (text) (PDF)
114-221	September 23, 2016	Native American Tourism and Improving Visitor Experience Act	To enhance and integrate Native American tourism, empower Native American communities, increase coordination and collaboration between Federal tourism assets, and expand heritage and cultural tourism opportunities in the United States	Pub. L. 114–221 (text) (PDF)
114-222	September 28, 2016	Justice Against Sponsors of Terrorism Act	To deter terrorism, provide justice for victims, and for other purposes	Pub. L. 114–222 (text) (PDF)
114-223	September 29, 2016	Continuing Appropriations and Military Construction, Veterans Affairs, and Related Agencies Appropriations Act, 2017, and Zika Response and Preparedness Act, with: Military Construction, Veterans Affairs, and Related Agencies Appropriations Act, 2017, and; Zika Response and Preparedness Appropriations Act, 2016, Continuing Appropriations Act, 2017	Making continuing appropriations for fiscal year 2017, and for other purposes	Pub. L. 114–223 (text) (PDF)
114-224	September 29, 2016	Virgin Islands of the United States Centennial Commission Act	To establish the Virgin Islands of the United States Centennial Commission	Pub. L. 114–224 (text) (PDF)
114-225	September 29, 2016	(No short title)	To designate the United States Customs and Border Protection Port of Entry located at 1400 Lower Island Road in Tornillo, Texas, as the "Marcelino Serna Port of Entry"	Pub. L. 114–225 (text) (PDF)
114-226	September 29, 2016	West Los Angeles Leasing Act of 2016	To authorize the Secretary of Veterans Affairs to enter into certain leases at the Department of Veterans Affairs West Los Angeles Campus in Los Angeles, California, to make certain improvements to the enhanced-use lease authority of the Department, and for other purposes	Pub. L. 114–226 (text) (PDF)
114-227	September 29, 2016	(No short title)	To amend title 36, United States Code, to authorize the American Battle Monuments Commission to acquire, operate, and maintain the Lafayette Escadrille Memorial in Marnes-la-Coquette, France, and for other purposes	Pub. L. 114–227 (text) (PDF)
114-228	September 29, 2016	Department of Veterans Affairs Expiring Authorities Act of 2016	To amend title 38, United States Code, to extend certain expiring provisions of law administered by the Secretary of Veterans Affairs, and for other purposes	Pub. L. 114–228 (text) (PDF)
114-229	September 30, 2016	Advancing Hope Act of 2016	To extend the pediatric priority review voucher program	Pub. L. 114–229 (text) (PDF)
114-230	October 7, 2016	Korean War Veterans Memorial Wall of Remembrance Act	To authorize a Wall of Remembrance as part of the Korean War Veterans Memorial and to allow certain private contributions to fund that Wall of Remembrance	Pub. L. 114–230 (text) (PDF)
114-231	October 7, 2016	Eliminate, Neutralize, and Disrupt Wildlife Trafficking Act of 2016	To support global anti-poaching efforts, strengthen the capacity of partner countries to counter wildlife trafficking, designate major wildlife trafficking countries, and for other purposes	Pub. L. 114–231 (text) (PDF)
114-232	October 7, 2016	Nevada Native Nations Land Act	To require the Secretary of the Interior to take land into trust for certain Indian tribes, and for other purposes	Pub. L. 114–232 (text) (PDF)
114-233	October 7, 2016	(No short title)	To amend the Gullah/Geechee Cultural Heritage Act to extend the authorization for the Gullah/Geechee Cultural Heritage Corridor Commission	Pub. L. 114–233 (text) (PDF)
114-234	October 7, 2016	(No short title)	To designate the building utilized as a United States courthouse located at 150 Reade Circle in Greenville, North Carolina, as the "Randy D. Doub United States Courthouse"	Pub. L. 114–234 (text) (PDF)
114-235	October 7, 2016	Bathrooms Accessible in Every Situation Act	To amend title 40, United States Code, to require restrooms in public buildings to be equipped with baby changing facilities	Pub. L. 114–235 (text) (PDF)
114-236	October 7, 2016	Survivors' Bill of Rights Act of 2016	To establish certain rights for sexual assault survivors, and for other purposes	Pub. L. 114–236 (text) (PDF)
114-237	October 7, 2016	Clarification of Treatment of Electronic Sales of Livestock Act of 2016	To amend the Packers and Stockyards Act, 1921, to clarify the duties relating to services furnished in connection with the buying or selling of livestock in commerce through online, video, or other electronic methods, and for other purposes	Pub. L. 114–237 (text) (PDF)
114-238	October 7, 2016	(No short title)	To amend title 49, United States Code, with respect to certain grant assurances, and for other purposes	Pub. L. 114–238 (text) (PDF)
114-239	October 7, 2016	United States Appreciation for Olympians and Paralympians Act of 2016	To amend the Internal Revenue Code of 1986 to exclude from gross income any prizes or awards won in competition in the Olympic Games or the Paralympic Games	Pub. L. 114–239 (text) (PDF)
114-240	October 7, 2016	Veterans Day Moment of Silence Act	To amend title 36, United States Code, to encourage the nationwide observance of two minutes of silence each Veterans Day	Pub. L. 114–240 (text) (PDF)
114-241	October 7, 2016	Treatment of Certain Payments in Eugenics Compensation Act	To exclude payments from State eugenics compensation programs from consideration in determining eligibility for, or the amount of, Federal public benefits	Pub. L. 114–241 (text) (PDF)
114-242	October 7, 2016	Federal Aviation Administration Veteran Transition Improvement Act of 2016	To include disabled veteran leave in the personnel management system of the Federal Aviation Administration	Pub. L. 114–242 (text) (PDF)
114-243	October 7, 2016	(No short title)	To designate the community-based outpatient clinic of the Department of Veterans Affairs in Pueblo, Colorado, as the "PFC James Dunn VA Clinic"	Pub. L. 114–243 (text) (PDF)
114-244	October 14, 2016	Alyce Spotted Bear and Walter Soboleff Commission on Native Children Act	To establish the Alyce Spotted Bear and Walter Soboleff Commission on Native Children, and for other purposes	Pub. L. 114–244 (text) (PDF)
114-245	November 28, 2016	National Forest System Trails Stewardship Act	To direct the Secretary of Agriculture to publish in the Federal Register a strategy to significantly increase the role of volunteers and partners in National Forest System trail maintenance, and for other purposes	Pub. L. 114–245 (text) (PDF)
114-246	November 28, 2016	Gold Star Families Voices Act	To amend the Veterans' Oral History Project Act to allow the collection of video and audio recordings of biographical histories by immediate family members of members of the Armed Forces who died as a result of their service during a period of war	Pub. L. 114–246 (text) (PDF)
114-247	November 28, 2016	No Veterans Crisis Line Call Should Go Unanswered Act	To direct the Secretary of Veterans Affairs to improve the Veterans Crisis Line	Pub. L. 114–247 (text) (PDF)
114-248	November 28, 2016	(No short title)	To amend title 49, United States Code, to include consideration of certain impacts on commercial space launch and reentry activities in a navigable airspace analysis, and for other purposes	Pub. L. 114–248 (text) (PDF)
114-249	December 8, 2016	Outdoor Recreation Jobs and Economic Impact Act of 2016	To require the Secretary of Commerce to conduct an assessment and analysis of the outdoor recreation economy of the United States, and for other purposes	Pub. L. 114–249 (text) (PDF)
114-250	December 8, 2016	(No short title)	To amend title 5, United States Code, to expand law enforcement availability pay to employees of U.S. Customs and Border Protection's Air and Marine Operations	Pub. L. 114–250 (text) (PDF)
114-251	December 8, 2016	(No short title)	To amend title 5, United States Code, to provide for an annuity supplement for certain air traffic controllers	Pub. L. 114–251 (text) (PDF)
114-252	December 8, 2016	(No short title)	To designate the Federal building and United States courthouse located at 511 East San Antonio Avenue in El Paso, Texas, as the "R.E. Thomason Federal Building and United States Courthouse"	Pub. L. 114–252 (text) (PDF)
114-253	December 8, 2016	(No short title)	To designate the Federal building and United States courthouse located at 300 Fannin Street in Shreveport, Louisiana, as the "Tom Stagg United States Court House"	Pub. L. 114–253 (text) (PDF)
114-254	December 10, 2016	Further Continuing and Security Assistance Appropriations Act, 2017, with: SOAR Funding Availability Act, Continued Health Benefits for Miners Act, Further Continuing Appropriations Act, 2017, and; Security Assistance Appropriations Act, 2017	Making appropriations for energy and water development and related agencies for the fiscal year ending September 30, 2016, and for other purposes	Pub. L. 114–254 (text) (PDF)
114-255	December 13, 2016	21st Century Cures Act, with: Helping Families in Mental Health Crisis Reform Act of 2016, and; Increasing Choice, Access, and Quality in Health Care for Americans Act	To accelerate the discovery, development, and delivery of 21st century cures, and for other purposes	Pub. L. 114–255 (text) (PDF)
114-256	December 14, 2016	Veterans Mobility Safety Act of 2016	To amend title 38, United States Code, to make certain improvements in the provision of automobiles and adaptive equipment by the Department of Veterans Affairs	Pub. L. 114–256 (text) (PDF)
114-257	December 14, 2016	District of Columbia Judicial Financial Transparency Act	To update the financial disclosure requirements for judges of the District of Columbia courts and to make other improvements to the District of Columbia courts	Pub. L. 114–257 (text) (PDF)
114-258	December 14, 2016	Consumer Review Fairness Act of 2016	To prohibit the use of certain clauses in form contracts that restrict the ability of a consumer to communicate regarding the goods or services offered in interstate commerce that were the subject of the contract, and for other purposes	Pub. L. 114–258 (text) (PDF)
114-259	December 14, 2016	(No short title)	To name the Department of Veterans Affairs temporary lodging facility in Indianapolis, Indiana, as the "Dr. Otis Bowen Veteran House"	Pub. L. 114–259 (text) (PDF)
114-260	December 14, 2016	GAO Civilian Task and Delivery Order Protest Authority Act of 2016	To strike the sunset on certain provisions relating to the authorized protest of a task or delivery order under section 4106 of title 41, United States Code	Pub. L. 114–260 (text) (PDF)
114-261	December 14, 2016	(No short title)	To enhance whistleblower protection for contractor and grantee employees	Pub. L. 114–261 (text) (PDF)
114-262	December 14, 2016	(No short title)	To provide for the addition of certain real property to the reservation of the Siletz Tribe in the State of Oregon	Pub. L. 114–262 (text) (PDF)
114-263	December 14, 2016	(No short title)	To amend the Grand Ronde Reservation Act to make technical corrections, and for other purposes	Pub. L. 114–263 (text) (PDF)
114-264	December 14, 2016	Program Management Improvement Accountability Act	To amend title 31, United States Code, to establish entities tasked with improving program and project management in certain Federal agencies, and for other purposes	Pub. L. 114–264 (text) (PDF)
114-265	December 14, 2016	Filipino Veterans of World War II Congressional Gold Medal Act of 2015	To award a Congressional Gold Medal, collectively, to the Filipino veterans of World War II, in recognition of the dedicated service of the veterans during World War II	Pub. L. 114–265 (text) (PDF)
114-266	December 14, 2016	(No short title)	To require a regional strategy to address the threat posed by Boko Haram	Pub. L. 114–266 (text) (PDF)
114-267	December 14, 2016	Northern Border Security Review Act	To require the Secretary of Homeland Security to conduct a Northern Border threat analysis, and for other purposes	Pub. L. 114–267 (text) (PDF)
114-268	December 14, 2016	First Responder Anthrax Preparedness Act	To direct the Secretary of Homeland Security to make anthrax vaccines available to emergency response providers, and for other purposes	Pub. L. 114–268 (text) (PDF)
114-269	December 14, 2016	Office of Strategic Services Congressional Gold Medal Act	To award the Congressional Gold Medal, collectively, to the members of the Office of Strategic Services (OSS) in recognition of their superior service and major contributions during World War II	Pub. L. 114–269 (text) (PDF)
114-270	December 14, 2016	Expanding Capacity for Health Outcomes Act	To require studies and reports examining the use of, and opportunities to use, technology-enabled collaborative learning and capacity building models to improve programs of the Department of Health and Human Services, and for other purposes	Pub. L. 114–270 (text) (PDF)
114-271	December 14, 2016	(No short title)	To ensure funding for the National Human Trafficking Hotline, and for other purposes	Pub. L. 114–271 (text) (PDF)
114-272	December 14, 2016	(No short title)	To redesignate the Olympic Wilderness as the Daniel J. Evans Wilderness	Pub. L. 114–272 (text) (PDF)
114-273	December 14, 2016	Charles Duncan Buried with Honor Act of 2016	To amend title 38, United States Code, to authorize the Secretary of Veterans Affairs to furnish caskets and urns for burial in cemeteries of States and tribal organizations of veterans without next of kin or sufficient resources to provide for caskets or urns, and for other purposes	Pub. L. 114–273 (text) (PDF)
114-274	December 14, 2016	Better Online Tickets Sales Act	To prohibit the circumvention of control measures used by Internet ticket sellers to ensure equitable consumer access to tickets for any given event, and for other purposes	Pub. L. 114–274 (text) (PDF)
114-275	December 14, 2016	Prescribed Burn Approval Act of 2016	To require limitations on prescribed burns	Pub. L. 114–275 (text) (PDF)
114-276	December 14, 2016	(No short title)	To designate the Traverse City VA Community-Based Outpatient Clinic of the Department of Veterans Affairs in Traverse City, Michigan, as the "Colonel Demas T. Craw VA Clinic"	Pub. L. 114–276 (text) (PDF)
114-277	December 15, 2016	Iran Sanctions Extension Act	To reauthorize the Iran Sanctions Act of 1996	Pub. L. 114–277 (text) (PDF)
114-278	December 16, 2016	(No short title)	To require the Secretary of Homeland Security to prepare a comprehensive security assessment of the transportation security card program, and for other purposes	Pub. L. 114–278 (text) (PDF)
114-279	December 16, 2016	Cross-Border Trade Enhancement Act of 2016	To provide for alternative financing arrangements for the provision of certain services and the construction and maintenance of infrastructure at land border ports of entry, and for other purposes	Pub. L. 114–279 (text) (PDF)
114-280	December 16, 2016	(No short title)	Designate the Department of Veterans Affairs community-based outpatient clinic in Newark, Ohio, as the Daniel L. Kinnard VA Clinic	Pub. L. 114–280 (text) (PDF)
114-281	December 16, 2016	Frank R. Wolf International Religious Freedom Act	To amend the International Religious Freedom Act of 1998 to improve the ability of the United States to advance religious freedom globally through enhanced diplomacy, training, counterterrorism, and foreign assistance efforts, and through stronger and more flexible political responses to religious freedom violations and violent extremism worldwide, and for other purposes	Pub. L. 114–281 (text) (PDF)
114-282	December 16, 2016	Apollo 11 50th Anniversary Commemorative Coin Act	To require the Secretary of the Treasury to mint commemorative coins in recognition of the 50th anniversary of the first manned landing on the Moon	Pub. L. 114–282 (text) (PDF)
114-283	December 16, 2016	(No short title)	Designate the facility of the United States Postal Service located at 1221 State Street, Suite 12, Santa Barbara, California, as the "Special Warfare Operator Master Chief Petty Officer (SEAL) Louis 'Lou' J. Langlais Post Office Building"	Pub. L. 114–283 (text) (PDF)
114-284	December 16, 2016	SEC Small Business Advocate Act of 2016	To amend the Securities Exchange Act of 1934 to establish an Office of the Advocate for Small Business Capital Formation and a Small Business Capital Formation Advisory Committee, and for other purposes	Pub. L. 114–284 (text) (PDF)
114-285	December 16, 2016	Federal Law Enforcement Training Centers Reform and Improvement Act of 2015	To improve homeland security, including domestic preparedness and response to terrorism, by reforming Federal Law Enforcement Training Centers to provide training to first responders, and for other purposes	Pub. L. 114–285 (text) (PDF)
114-286	December 16, 2016	Faster Care for Veterans Act of 2016	To direct the Secretary of Veterans Affairs to carry out a pilot program establishing a patient self-scheduling appointment system, and for other purposes	Pub. L. 114–286 (text) (PDF)
114-287	December 16, 2016	Federal Assets Sale and Transfer Act of 2016	To decrease the deficit by consolidating and selling Federal buildings and other civilian real property, and for other purposes	Pub. L. 114–287 (text) (PDF)
114-288	December 16, 2016	(No short title)	To designate the Federal building and United States courthouse located at 121 Spring Street SE in Gainesville, Georgia, as the "Sidney Oslin Smith, Jr. Federal Building and United States Courthouse"	Pub. L. 114–288 (text) (PDF)
114-289	December 16, 2016	National Park Service Centennial Act, with: National Park Foundation Endowment Act, and; National Historic Preservation Amendments Act	To prepare the National Park Service for its Centennial in 2016 and for a second century of promoting and protecting the natural, historic, and cultural resources of our National Parks for the enjoyment of present and future generations, and for other purposes	Pub. L. 114–289 (text) (PDF)
114-290	December 16, 2016	(No short title)	To designate the facility of the United States Postal Service located at 23323 Shelby Road in Shelby, Indiana, as the "Richard Allen Cable Post Office"	Pub. L. 114–290 (text) (PDF)
114-291	December 16, 2016	United States-Caribbean Strategic Engagement Act of 2016	To increase engagement with the governments of the Caribbean region, the Caribbean diaspora community in the United States, and the private sector and civil society in both the United States and the Caribbean, and for other purposes	Pub. L. 114–291 (text) (PDF)
114-292	December 16, 2016	Combat-Injured Veterans Tax Fairness Act of 2016	To restore amounts improperly withheld for tax purposes from severance payments to individuals who retired or separated from service in the Armed Forces for combat-related injuries, and for other purposes	Pub. L. 114–292 (text) (PDF)
114-293	December 16, 2016	Bottles and Breastfeeding Equipment Screening Act	To direct the Administrator of the Transportation Security Administration to notify air carriers and security screening personnel of the Transportation Security Administration of such Administration's guidelines regarding permitting baby formula, breast milk, purified deionized water, and juice on airplanes, and for other purposes	Pub. L. 114–293 (text) (PDF)
114-294	December 16, 2016	Communities Helping Invest through Property and Improvements Needed for Veterans Act of 2016	To establish a pilot program on partnership agreements to construct new facilities for the Department of Veterans Affairs	Pub. L. 114–294 (text) (PDF)
114-295	December 16, 2016	(No short title)	To designate the facility of the United States Postal Service located at 3031 Veterans Road West in Staten Island, New York, as the "Leonard Montalto Post Office Building"	Pub. L. 114–295 (text) (PDF)
114-296	December 16, 2016	(No short title)	To designate the facility of the United States Postal Service located at 401 McElroy Drive in Oxford, Mississippi, as the "Army First Lieutenant Donald C. Carwile Post Office Building"	Pub. L. 114–296 (text) (PDF)
114-297	December 16, 2016	(No short title)	To designate the facility of the United States Postal Service located at 14231 TX-150 in Coldspring, Texas, as the "E. Marie Youngblood Post Office"	Pub. L. 114–297 (text) (PDF)
114-298	December 16, 2016	(No short title)	To designate the facility of the United States Postal Service located at 810 N US Highway 83 in Zapata, Texas, as the "Zapata Veterans Post Office"	Pub. L. 114–298 (text) (PDF)
114-299	December 16, 2016	(No short title)	To designate the facility of the United States Postal Service located at 2886 Sandy Plains Road in Marietta, Georgia, as the "Marine Lance Corporal Squire 'Skip' Wells Post Office Building"	Pub. L. 114–299 (text) (PDF)
114-300	December 16, 2016	(No short title)	To designate the facility of the United States Postal Service located at 6300 N. Northwest Highway in Chicago, Illinois, as the "Officer Joseph P. Cali Post Office Building"	Pub. L. 114–300 (text) (PDF)
114-301	December 16, 2016	GAO Mandates Revision Act of 2016	To eliminate or modify certain mandates of the Government Accountability Office	Pub. L. 114–301 (text) (PDF)
114-302	December 16, 2016	Federal Bureau of Investigation Whistleblower Protection Enhancement Act of 2016	To provide adequate protections for whistleblowers at the Federal Bureau of Investigation	Pub. L. 114–302 (text) (PDF)
114-303	December 16, 2016	(No short title)	To designate the facility of the United States Postal Service located at 1101 Davis Street in Evanston, Illinois, as the "Abner J. Mikva Post Office Building"	Pub. L. 114–303 (text) (PDF)
114-304	December 16, 2016	United States-Israel Advanced Research Partnership Act of 2016	To amend the Homeland Security Act of 2002 and the United States-Israel Strategic Partnership Act of 2014 to promote cooperative homeland security research and antiterrorism programs relating to cybersecurity, and for other purposes	Pub. L. 114–304 (text) (PDF)
114-305	December 16, 2016	(No short title)	To designate the facility of the United States Postal Service located at 1 Chalan Kanoa VLG in Saipan, Northern Mariana Islands, as the "Segundo T. Sablan and CNMI Fallen Military Heroes Post Office Building"	Pub. L. 114–305 (text) (PDF)
114-306	December 16, 2016	(No short title)	To designate the facility of the United States Postal Service located at 830 Kuhn Drive in Chula Vista, California, as the "Jonathan 'J.D.' De Guzman Post Office Building"	Pub. L. 114–306 (text) (PDF)
114-307	December 16, 2016	(No short title)	To allow the Administrator of the Federal Aviation Administration to Enter into reimbursable agreements for certain airport projects	Pub. L. 114–307 (text) (PDF)
114-308	December 16, 2016	Holocaust Expropriated Art Recovery Act of 2016	To provide the victims of Holocaust-era persecution and their heirs a fair opportunity to recover works of art confiscated or misappropriated by the Nazis	Pub. L. 114–308 (text) (PDF)
114-309	December 16, 2016	(No short title)	To designate the facility of the United States Postal Service located at 560 East Pleasant Valley Road, Port Hueneme, California, as the U.S. Naval Construction Battalion "Seabees" Fallen Heroes Post Office Building	Pub. L. 114–309 (text) (PDF)
114-310	December 16, 2016	(No short title)	To designate the facility of the United States Postal Service located at 2024 Jerome Avenue, in Bronx, New York, as the "Dr. Roscoe C. Brown, Jr. Post Office Building"	Pub. L. 114–310 (text) (PDF)
114-311	December 16, 2016	Overtime Pay for Protective Services Act of 2016	To provide an increase in premium pay for protective services during 2016, and for other purposes	Pub. L. 114–311 (text) (PDF)
114-312	December 16, 2016	(No short title)	To designate the facility of the United States Postal Service located at 501 North Main Street in Florence, Arizona, as the "Adolfo 'Harpo' Celaya Post Office"	Pub. L. 114–312 (text) (PDF)
114-313	December 16, 2016	(No short title)	To name the Department of Veterans Affairs health care system in Long Beach, California, the "Tibor Rubin VA Medical Center"	Pub. L. 114–313 (text) (PDF)
114-314	December 16, 2016	(No short title)	To revise the boundaries of certain John H. Chafee Coastal Barrier Resources System units in New Jersey	Pub. L. 114–314 (text) (PDF)
114-315	December 16, 2016	Jeff Miller and Richard Blumenthal Veterans Health Care and Benefits Improvement Act of 2016	To amend title 38, United States Code, to make certain improvements in the laws administered by the Secretary of Veterans Affairs, and for other purposes	Pub. L. 114–315 (text) (PDF)
114-316	December 16, 2016	Promoting Travel, Commerce, and National Security Act of 2016	To ensure United States jurisdiction over offenses committed by United States personnel stationed in Canada in furtherance of border security initiatives	Pub. L. 114–316 (text) (PDF)
114-317	December 16, 2016	Inspector General Empowerment Act of 2016	To amend the Inspector General Act of 1978 to strengthen the independence of the Inspectors General, and for other purposes	Pub. L. 114–317 (text) (PDF)
114-318	December 16, 2016	Federal Property Management Reform Act of 2016	To improve the Government-wide management of Federal property	Pub. L. 114–318 (text) (PDF)
114-319	December 16, 2016	Foreign Cultural Exchange Jurisdictional Immunity Clarification Act	To amend chapter 97 of title 28, United States Code, to clarify the exception to foreign sovereign immunity set forth in section 1605(a)(3) of such title	Pub. L. 114–319 (text) (PDF)
114-320	December 16, 2016	(No short title)	To provide for the approval of the Agreement for Cooperation Between the Government of the United States of America and the Government of the Kingdom of Norway Concerning Peaceful Uses of Nuclear Energy	Pub. L. 114–320 (text) (PDF)
114-321	December 16, 2016	RESPONSE Act of 2016	To establish the Railroad Emergency Services Preparedness, Operational Needs, and Safety Evaluation (RESPONSE) Subcommittee under the Federal Emergency Management Agency's National Advisory Council to provide recommendations on emergency responder training and resources relating to hazardous materials incidents involving railroads, and for other purposes	Pub. L. 114–321 (text) (PDF)
114-322	December 16, 2016	Water Infrastructure Improvements for the Nation Act, with: Water Resources Development Act of 2016, Water and Waste Act of 2016, Pechanga Band of Luiseno Mission Indians Water Rights Settlement Act, and; Blackfeet Water Rights Settlement Act	To provide for improvements to the rivers and harbors of the United States, to provide for the conservation and development of water and related resources, and for other purposes	Pub. L. 114–322 (text) (PDF)
114-323	December 16, 2016	Department of State Authorities Act, Fiscal Year 2017	To authorize the Department of State for fiscal year 2016, and for other purposes	Pub. L. 114–323 (text) (PDF)
114-324	December 16, 2016	Justice for All Reauthorization Act of 2016, with: Effective Administration of Criminal Justice Act of 2016	To protect crime victims' rights, to eliminate the substantial backlog of DNA and other forensic evidence samples to improve and expand the forensic science testing capacity of Federal, State, and local crime laboratories, to increase research and development of new testing technologies, to develop new training programs regarding the collection and use of forensic evidence, to provide post-conviction testing of DNA evidence to exonerate the innocent, to support accreditation efforts of forensic science laboratories and medical examiner offices, to address training and equipment needs, to improve the performance of counsel in State capital cases, and for other purposes	Pub. L. 114–324 (text) (PDF)
114-325	December 16, 2016	Emmett Till Unsolved Civil Rights Crimes Reauthorization Act of 2016	To reauthorize the Emmett Till Unsolved Civil Rights Crime Act of 2007	Pub. L. 114–325 (text) (PDF)
114-326	December 16, 2016	National Urban Search and Rescue Response System Act of 2016	To authorize the National Urban Search and Rescue Response System	Pub. L. 114–326 (text) (PDF)
114-327	December 16, 2016	Ensuring Access to Pacific Fisheries Act, with: Northwest Atlantic Fisheries Convention Amendments Act	To implement the Convention on the Conservation and Management of High Seas Fisheries Resources in the North Pacific Ocean, to implement the Convention on the Conservation and Management of High Seas Fishery Resources in the South Pacific Ocean, and for other purposes	Pub. L. 114–327 (text) (PDF)
114-328	December 23, 2016	National Defense Authorization Act for Fiscal Year 2017, with: Administrative Leave Act of 2016, Global Magnitsky Human Rights Accountability Act, Guam World War II Loyalty Recognition Act, Military Construction Authorization Act for Fiscal Year 2017, Pribilof Islands Transition Completion Amendments Act of 2016, and; Military Justice Act of 2016	To authorize appropriations for fiscal year 2017 for military activities of the Department of Defense, for military construction, and for defense activities of the Department of Energy, to prescribe military personnel strengths for such fiscal year, and for other purposes	Pub. L. 114–328 (text) (PDF)
114-329	January 6, 2017	American Innovation and Competitiveness Act, with: Networking and Information Technology Research and Development Modernization Act of 2016, Research and Development Efficiency Act, International Science and Technology Cooperation Act of 2016, Science Prize Competition Act, Crowdsourcing and Citizen Science Act, Manufacturing Extension Partnership Improvement Act, and; United States Chief Technology Officer Act	To invest in innovation through research and development, and to improve the competitiveness of the United States	Pub. L. 114–329 (text) (PDF)

== Private laws ==
No private laws were enacted this Congress.

== Treaties ==
No treaties were enacted this Congress.

== See also ==
- List of bills in the 114th United States Congress
- List of bills in the 115th United States Congress
- List of United States presidential vetoes § Barack Obama
- List of United States federal legislation
- List of Acts of the 113th United States Congress
- List of Acts of the 115th United States Congress
