= Commercial use of space =

Economic activities related to space

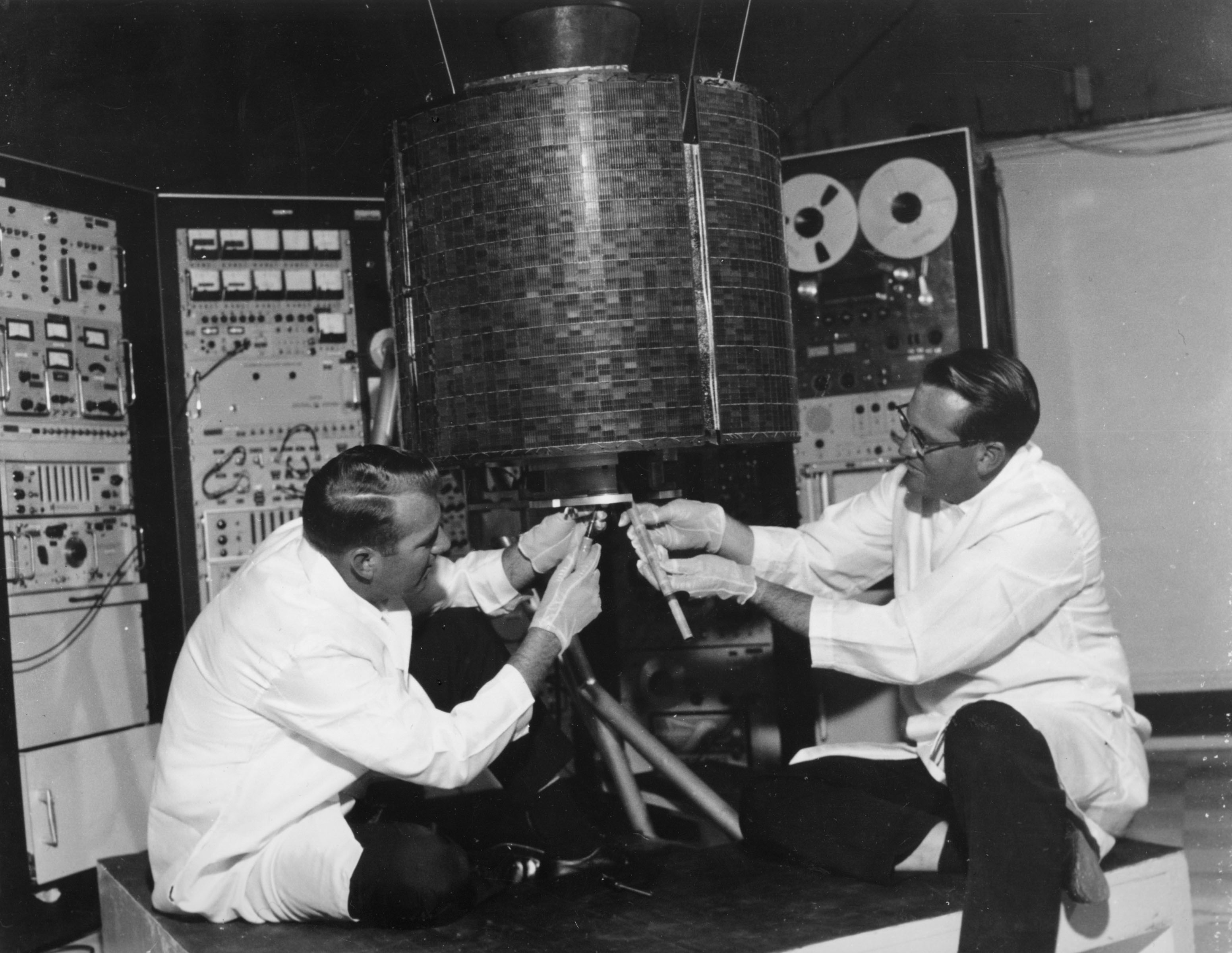
Intelsat I (1965), the world's first commercial communications satellite, was used among others to relay the Our World multi-national broadcast (1967), the first multi-satellite relayed television broadcast.

Space economy refers to the set of activities, industries, technologies, services, and resources that generate economic value through the space exploration, understanding, management, and exploitation of outer space.

Commercial satellite use began in 1962 with Telstar 1, transmitting TV signals across the Atlantic Ocean. Syncom 3 expanded possibilities in 1964, broadcasting the Olympics. NASA's TIROS satellites advanced meteorological research, while Intelsat I in 1965 showed commercial viability. Later, France's Arianespace and USA's Iridium Communications furthered satellite services. By 2004, global investment in all space sectors was estimated to be US$50.8 billion. As of 2010, 31% of all space launches were commercial. By the year 2035, the space economy is projected to have grown to $1.8 trillion.

The commercial spaceflight sector primarily generates revenue by launching satellites into Earth's orbit, facilitated by providers deploying satellites into Low Earth Orbit and Geostationary Earth Orbit. The Federal Aviation Administration (FAA) licenses six U.S. spaceports and oversees commercial rocket launches, with global capacity expanding from sites in Russia, France, and China. Investment in reusable launch vehicles by companies like SpaceX and Blue Origin is driving innovation in this sector. In 2022, 74 FAA-licensed commercial space operations were conducted, and this number is expected to double in the near future.

Commercial satellite manufacturing encompasses non-military, civilian, governmental, and non-profit satellite production along with ground equipment manufacturing, supporting satellite operations, and transponder leasing providing satellite access. Satellite subscription services offer access to a variety of television channels (such as DirecTV and Dish network), radio stations (like SiriusXM), and other media content through satellite transmission. Satellite imagery provides detailed views of Earth, sold by imaging companies to governments and businesses like Apple Maps. Satellite telecommunications enable Internet services globally. Satellite navigation systems use signals from satellites for precise positioning and timing. Space tourism ventures (led by SpaceX, Virgin Galactic and Blue Origin) envision recreational human space travel. Commercial space resource recovery involves extracting materials from asteroids and other celestial bodies for use in space or on Earth.

Space commerce regulation has historically faced challenges regarding property rights in space, but legislation like the U.S. Commercial Space Launch Competitiveness Act aims to clarify ownership and encourage commercial space exploration.

== History ==
The first commercial use of satellites may have been the Telstar 1 satellite, launched in 1962, which was the first privately sponsored space launch, funded by AT&T and Bell Telephone Laboratories. Telstar 1 was capable of relaying television signals across the Atlantic Ocean, and was the first satellite to transmit live television, telephone, fax, and other data signals. Two years later, the Hughes Aircraft Company developed the Syncom 3 satellite, a geosynchronous communications satellite, leased to the Department of Defense. Commercial possibilities of satellites were further realized when the Syncom 3, orbiting near the International Date Line, was used to telecast the 1964 Olympic Games from Tokyo to the United States.

Between 1960 and 1966, the U.S. National Aeronautics and Space Administration (NASA) launched a series of early weather satellites known as Television Infrared Observation Satellites (TIROS). These satellites greatly advanced meteorology worldwide, as satellite imagery was used for better forecasting, for both public and commercial interests.

On April 6, 1965, the Hughes Aircraft Company placed the Intelsat I communications satellite in geosynchronous orbit over the Atlantic Ocean. Intelsat I was built for the Communications Satellite Corporation (COMSAT), and demonstrated that satellite-based communication was commercially feasible. Intelsat I allowed for near-instantaneous contact between Europe and North America by handling television, telephone and fax transmissions. Two years later, the Soviet Union launched the Orbita satellite, which provided television signals across Russia, and started the first national satellite television network. Similarly, the 1972 Anik A satellite, launched by Telesat Canada, allowed the Canadian Broadcasting Corporation to reach northern Canada for the first time.

In 1980, Europe's Arianespace became the world's first commercial launch service provider.

Beginning in 1997, Iridium Communications began launching a series of satellites known as the Iridium satellite constellation, which provided the first satellites for direct satellite telephone service.

== Spaceflight ==
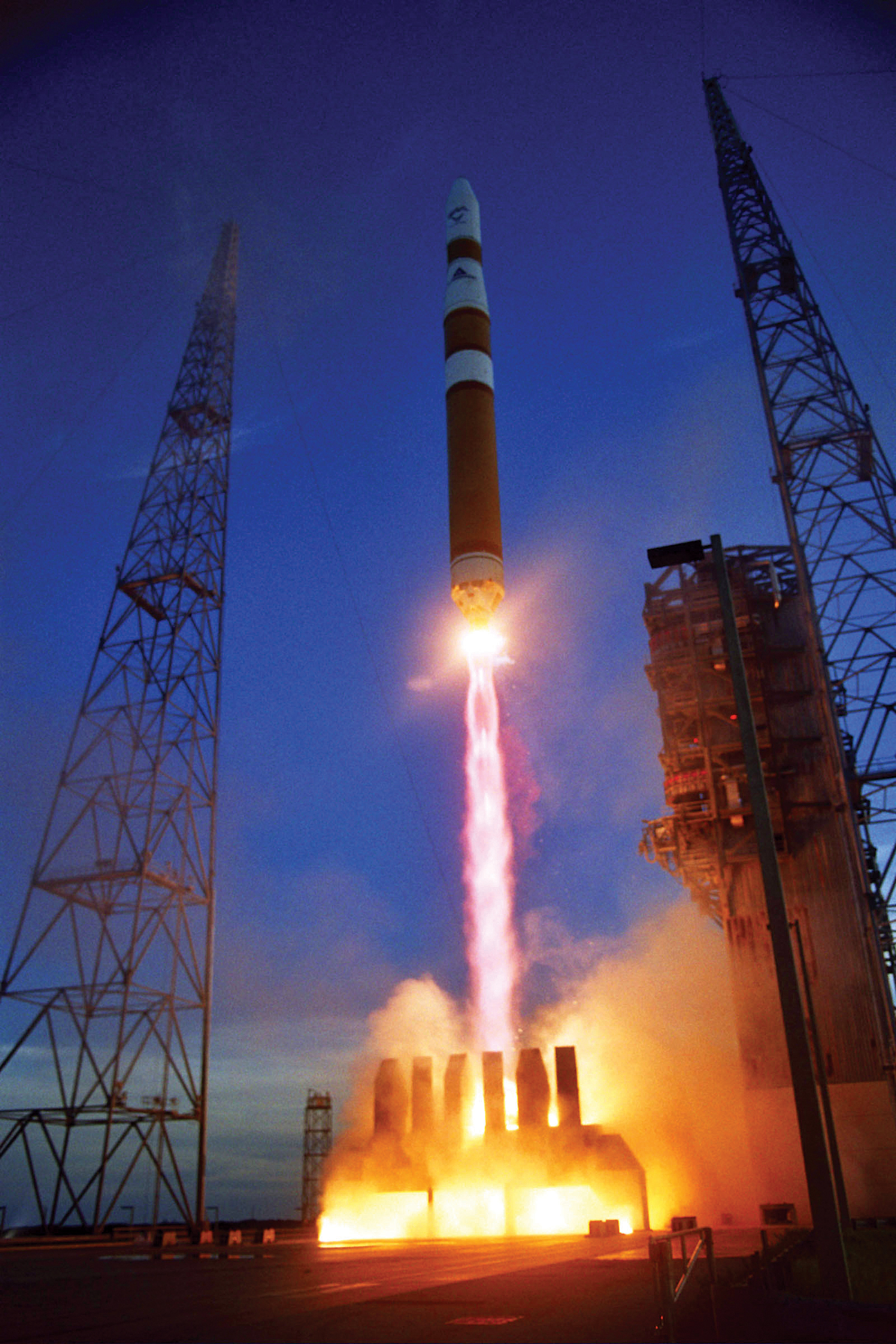
Delta IV Medium launch carrying DSCS III-B6

The commercial spaceflight industry derives the bulk of its revenue from the launching of satellites into the Earth's orbit. Commercial launch providers typically place private and government satellites into low Earth orbit (LEO) and geosynchronous Earth orbit (GEO).

The Federal Aviation Administration (FAA) has licensed six commercial spaceports in the United States: Wallops Flight Facility, Kodiak Launch Complex, Spaceport Florida, Kennedy Space Center, Cape Canaveral Space Force Station, and the Vandenberg Air Force Base. Launch sites within Russia, France, and China have added to the global commercial launch capacity. The Delta IV, Atlas V, and Falcon family of launch vehicles are made available for commercial ventures for the United States, while Russia promotes eight families of vehicles.

Between 1996 and 2002, 245 launches were made for commercial ventures while government (non-classified) launches only totaled 167 for the same period. Commercial space flight has spurred investment into the development of an efficient reusable launch vehicle (RLV) which can place larger payloads into orbit. Several companies such as SpaceX and Blue Origin are currently developing new RLV designs.

In the United States, the Office of Commercial Space Transportation (generally referred to as FAA/AST or simply AST) is the branch of the Federal Aviation Administration (FAA) that approves any commercial rocket launch operations—that is, any launches that are not classified as model, amateur, or "by and for the government." In fiscal year 2022, there were 74 FAA-licensed commercial space operations, which includes both launches and reentries. In 2023, the FAA predicted that commercial launches it licenses could more than double in the next several years.

== Satellites and equipment ==
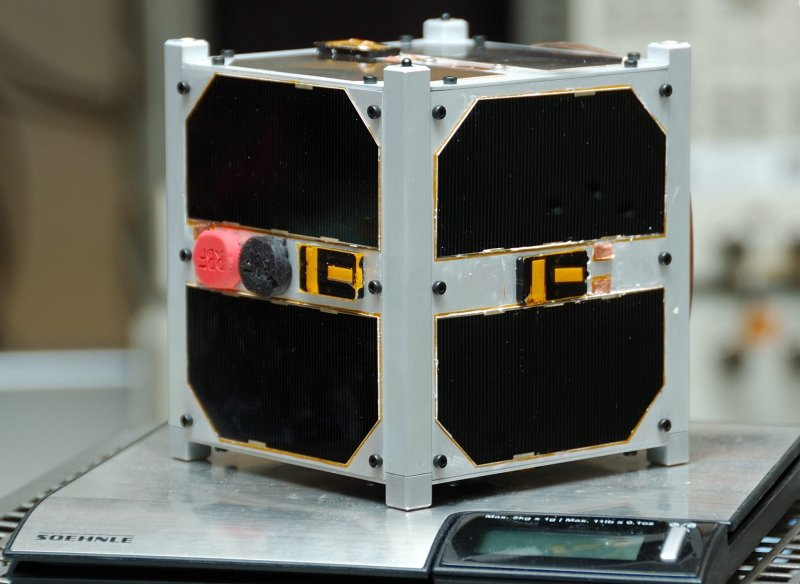
ESTCube-1, a low-cost CubeSat for education

=== Satellite manufacturing ===
Commercial satellite manufacturing is defined by the United States government as satellites manufactured for civilian, government, or non-profit use. Not included are satellites constructed for military use, nor for activities associated with any human space flight program. Between the years of 1996 and 2002, satellite manufacturing within the United States experienced an annual growth of 11%. The rest of the world experienced higher growth levels of around 13%.

=== Ground equipment manufacturing ===
Operating satellites communicate via receivers and transmitters on Earth. The manufacturing of satellite ground station communication terminals (including VSATs), mobile satellite telephones, and home television receivers are a part of the ground equipment manufacturing sector. This sector grew through the latter half of the 1990s as it manufactured equipment for the satellite services sector. Between 1996 and 2002, this industry saw a 14% annual increase.

=== Satellite imagery ===
Satellite imagery (also Earth observation imagery or spaceborne photography) are images of Earth or other planets collected by imaging satellites operated by governments and businesses around the world. Satellite imaging companies sell images by licensing them to governments and businesses such as Apple Maps and Google Maps.

=== Satellite telecommunications ===
In 1994, DirecTV debuted direct broadcast satellite by introducing a signal receiving dish 18 inches in diameter. In 1996, Astro started in Malaysia with the launch of the MEASAT satellite. In November 1999, the Satellite Home Viewer Improvement Act became law, and local stations were then made available in satellite channel packages, fueling the industry's growth in the years that followed. By the end of 2000, DTH subscriptions totaled over 67 million.

Satellite radio was pioneered by XM Satellite Radio and Sirius Satellite Radio. XM's first satellite was launched on March 18, 2001 and its second on May 8, 2001. Its first broadcast occurred on September 25, 2001, nearly four months before Sirius. Sirius launched the initial phase of its service in four cities on February 14, 2002, expanding to the rest of the contiguous United States on July 1, 2002. The two companies spent over $3 billion combined to develop satellite radio technology, build and launch the satellites, and for various other business expenses.

Satellite internet is also an emerging market, as they can be used to transmit and receive Internet services from space to any place in the planet Earth. This enables its use for markets such as cruise ships, long-haul buses, flights and rural areas. Starlink is a notable example of such a service offered by SpaceX.

==== Transponder leasing ====
Businesses that operate satellites often lease or sell access to their satellites to data relay and telecommunication firms. This service is often referred to as transponder leasing. Between 1996 and 2002, this industry experienced a 15% annual growth. The United States accounts for about 32% of the world's transponder market.

=== Satellite navigation ===
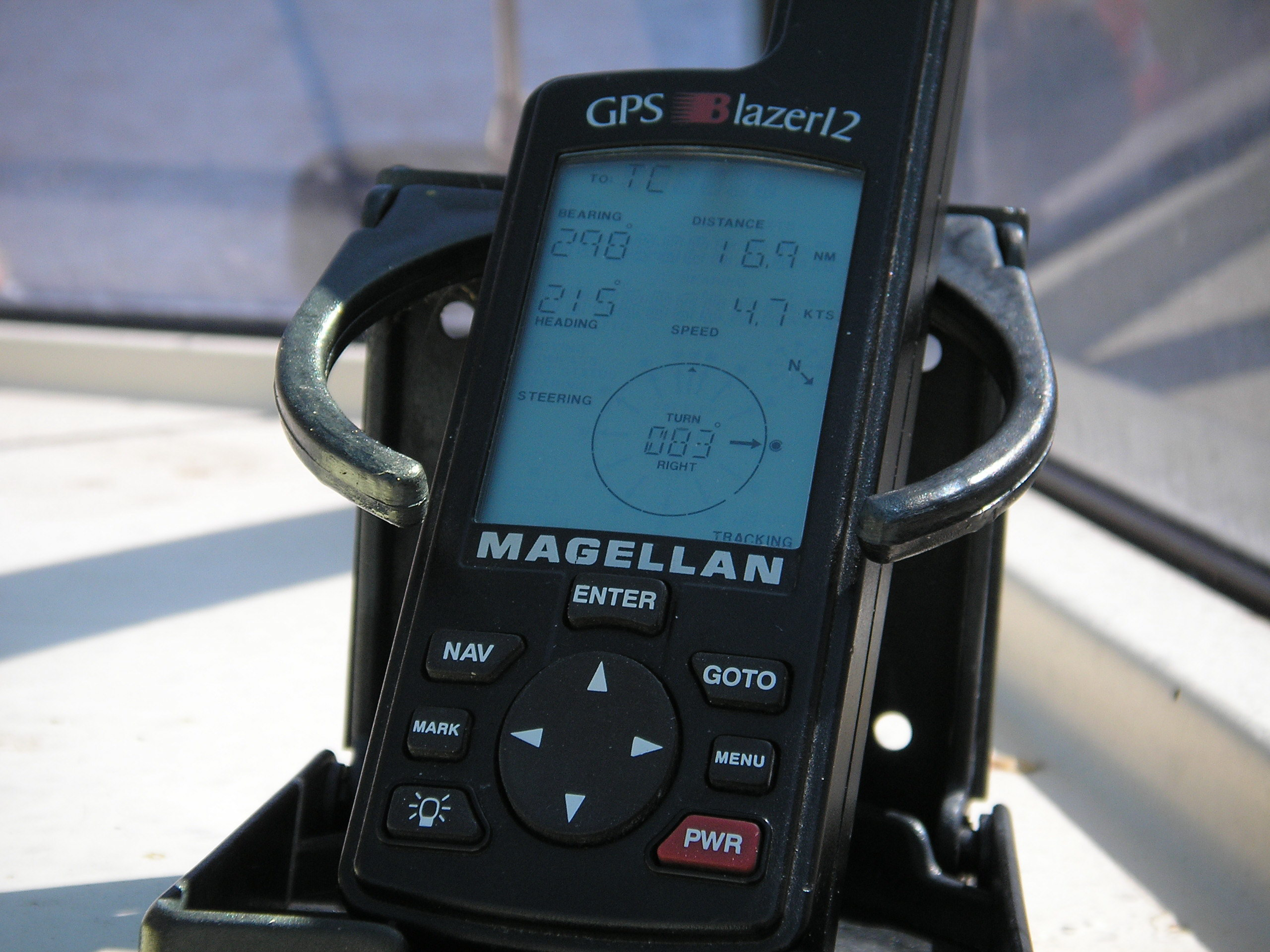
Magellan GPS receiver in a marine application

A satellite navigation or satnav system is a system that uses satellites to provide autonomous geo-spatial positioning. It allows small electronic receivers to determine their location (longitude, latitude, and altitude/elevation) to high precision (within a few centimeters to metres) using time signals transmitted along a line of sight by radio from satellites. The system can be used for providing position, navigation or for tracking the position of something fitted with a receiver (satellite tracking). The signals also allow the electronic receiver to calculate the current local time to high precision, which allows time synchronization. These uses are collectively known as Positioning, Navigation and Timing (PNT). Satnav systems operate independently of any telephonic or internet reception, though these technologies can enhance the usefulness of the positioning information generated.

== Space tourism ==
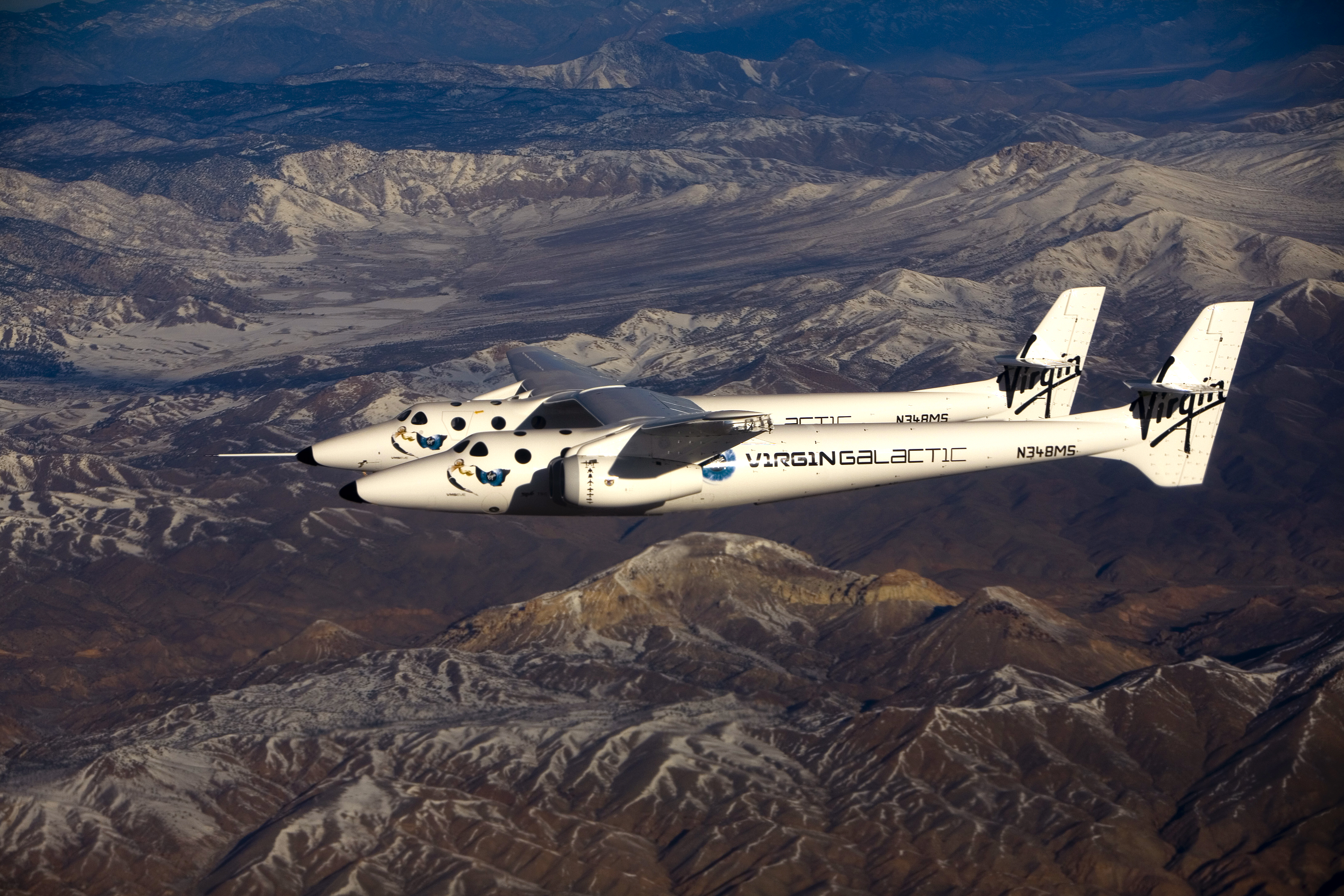
Virgin Galactic VMS Eve

Space tourism is human space travel for recreational purposes. There are several different types of space tourism, including orbital, suborbital and lunar space tourism. Work also continues towards developing suborbital space tourism vehicles. This is being done by aerospace companies like Blue Origin and Virgin Galactic.

== Commercial recovery of space resources ==
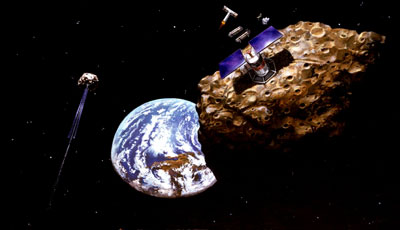
Artist's concept of asteroid mining

Commercial recovery of space resources is the exploitation of raw materials from asteroids, comets and other space objects, including near-Earth objects. Minerals and volatiles could be mined then used in space for in-situ utilization (e.g., construction materials and rocket propellant) or taken back to Earth. These include gold, iridium, silver, osmium, palladium, platinum, rhenium, rhodium, ruthenium and tungsten for transport back to Earth; iron, cobalt, manganese, molybdenum, nickel, aluminium, and titanium for construction; water and oxygen to sustain astronauts; as well as hydrogen, ammonia, and oxygen for use as rocket propellant.

There are several commercial enterprises working in this field, including ispace Inc. and Moon Express.

The first in-space transaction of resources is contracted by NASA to four companies to sell NASA collected lunar regolith on the Moon.

== Regulation ==
Beyond the many technological factors that could make space commercialization more widespread, it has been suggested that the lack of private property, the difficulty or inability of individuals in establishing property rights in space, has been an impediment to the development of space for both human habitation and commercial development.

Since the advent of space technology in the latter half of the twentieth century, the ownership of property in space has been murky, with strong arguments both for and against. In particular, the making of national territorial claims in outer space and on celestial bodies has been specifically proscribed by the Outer Space Treaty, which had been, as of 2012, ratified by all spacefaring nations.

On November 25, 2015, President Obama signed the U.S. Commercial Space Launch Competitiveness Act (H.R. 2262) into law. The law recognizes the right of U.S. citizens to own space resources they obtain and encourages the commercial exploration and utilization of resources from asteroids. According to the law under 51 U.S.C. § 51303:

A United States citizen engaged in commercial recovery of an asteroid resource or a space resource under this chapter shall be entitled to any asteroid resource or space resource obtained, including to possess, own, transport, use, and sell the asteroid resource or space resource obtained in accordance with applicable law, including the international obligations of the United States

== See also ==
- Space launch market competition
- Commercial astronaut
- Private spaceflight
- Satellite Internet access
- Space industry
- Space manufacturing
- Space-based industry
- Space pollution
- Space tourism
