= Space Resource Exploration and Utilization Act of 2015 =

Unsuccessful US Congressional bill

The Space Resource Exploration and Utilization Act of 2015 (H.R. 1508) was a bill (which never became law) introduced in the 114th Congress of the U.S. on March 19, 2015, by Rep. Bill Posey, Republican of Florida. It is identical to the Senate bill by the same name (S. 976). The bill would have expanded Presidential power regarding space resources, and regulated US-based space exploration companies. It expired at the end of the Congressional session without a vote in the full House or Senate. However, an Act with the same name was passed as part of the U.S. Commercial Space Launch Competitiveness Act of 2015 (see Sections 401 to 403 of that Act). See: Commercial Space Launch Competitiveness Act of 2015

The proposed bill (which was not passed) would have allowed the President to "facilitate the commercial exploration and utilization of space resources to meet national needs", and "promote the right of U.S. commercial entities to explore outer space and utilize space resources, in accordance with such obligations, free from harmful interference, and to transfer or sell such resources". It also would have allowed the President to make recommendations to Congress regarding exploration and utilization of space resources, and declared property rights for entities that obtain "asteroid resources". The bill also stated that a US commercial space company cannot cause harmful interference or "bring a civil action in a U.S. district court for any action by another entity subject to U.S. jurisdiction causing harmful interference to its operations with respect to an asteroid resource utilization activity in outer space".

== Legislative action ==
The bill was referred to the House Committee on Science, Space, and Technology. The committee produced a report on the bill, following its consideration and a mark-up session. It was then placed on the Union Calendar, (Calendar No. 111), by the House, but died when the Congressional session ended. However, an Act with the same name was passed as part of the U.S. Commercial Space Launch Competitiveness Act of 2015 (see Sections 401 to 403 of that Act). See: Commercial Space Launch Competitiveness Act of 2015

== Cosponsors ==
Cosponsors of H.R. 1508
Cosponsor	Date Cosponsored
Rep. Derek Kilmer [D-WA-6]	03/19/2015
Rep. John Katko [R-NY-24]	03/23/2015
Rep. Jim Bridenstine [R-OK-1]	03/23/2015
Rep. John L. Mica [R-FL-7]	03/23/2015
Rep. Brian Babin [R-TX-36]	03/23/2015
Rep. Bradley Byrne [R-AL-1]	03/23/2015
Rep. Mo Brooks [R-AL-5]	04/14/2015
Rep. Chris Collins [R-NY-27]	05/18/2015
