= National Defense Authorization Act for Fiscal Year 2016 =

United States federal law

- Long title: An act to authorize appropriations for fiscal year 2016 for military activities of the Department of Defense, for military construction, and for defense activities of the Department of Energy, to prescribe military personnel strengths for such fiscal year, and for other purposes.
- Enacted by: the 114th United States Congress

Citations
- Public law: Pub. L. 114–92 (text) (PDF)
- Statutes at Large: 129 Stat. 726 through 129 Stat. 1309

Legislative history
- Introduced in the Senate as S. 1356 by Sen. Ron Johnson (R, WI) on May 14, 2015; Passed the Senate on May 14, 2015; Passed the House on November 5, 2015 (Yeas: 370; Nays: 58) with amendment; Senate agreed to House amendment on November 10, 2015 (Yeas: 91; Nays: 3); Signed into law by President Barack Obama on November 25, 2015

The National Defense Authorization Act for Fiscal Year 2016 (S. 1356; NDAA 2016, Pub.L. 114-92) is a United States federal law which authorized funding and set policies for the U.S. Department of Defense (DoD) and Department of Energy (DoE) national security programs for fiscal year 2016, including authorizing appropriations for procurement, research and development, and operations, establishing military personnel strengths, and introducing a new blended retirement system for service members (effective 2018). The bill provided approximately $604.6 billion in total authorizations, including significant funds for Overseas Contingency Operations (OCO).

== History ==
In a statement from June 02, 2015, the United States Senate wrote that the federal government strongly objects to provisions in the bill and that it looks forward to working with congress to address these and other concerns. On September 30, 2015, President Barack Obama threatened to veto the NDAA 2016. The primary reason for the veto threat by the Obama administration was that the bill H.R. 1735 bypassed the Budget Control Act of 2011 spending caps by allocating nearly $90 billion to the Overseas Contingency Operations account, designating routine spending as emergency war expenses exempted from the caps. On October 22, 2015, Obama vetoed the bill.

Afterwards, an updated version passed the United States House of Representatives and the United States Senate, being signed by the President on November 25, 2015.

== See also ==
- List of bills in the 114th United States Congress
- National Defense Authorization Act
