= Coast Guard Authorization Act of 2015 =

- Other short titles: Pribilof Island Transition Completion Act of 2015
- Long title: An Act to authorize appropriations for the Coast Guard for fiscal years 2016 and 2017, and for other purposes.
- Enacted by: the 114th United States Congress

Citations
- Public law: Pub. L. 114–120 (text) (PDF)

Codification
- Titles amended: Titles 14 and 46

Legislative history
- Introduced in the House as H.R. 4188 by Duncan D. Hunter (R–CA) on December 8, 2015; Committee consideration by United States House Committee on Transportation and Infrastructure, United States House Transportation Subcommittee on Coast Guard and Maritime Transportation; Signed into law by President Barack Obama on February 8, 2016

The Coast Guard Authorization Act of 2015 is an act of the United States that governs the activities of the United States Coast Guard (USCG) and the Federal Maritime Commission (FMC). The act also authorizes appropriations totaling about $17.5 billion, primarily for ongoing USCG operations over the 2016–2017 period.

The act was introduced during the 114th United States Congress as H.R. 4188, passed on February 1, 2016, and was signed into law as Pub. L. 114–120 (text) (PDF) on February 8, 2016. Other related bills include House bill H.R. 1987 and Senate bill S. 1611.

== Background ==
The United States Coast Guard (USCG) is a branch of the United States Armed Forces and one of the country's seven uniformed services. The Coast Guard is a maritime, military, multi-mission service unique among the U.S. military branches for having a maritime law enforcement mission (with jurisdiction in both domestic and international waters) and a federal regulatory agency mission as part of its mission set.

An authorization bill is a type of legislation used in the United States to authorize the activities of the various agencies and programs that are part of the federal government of the United States. Authorizing such programs is one of the powers of the United States Congress. Authorizations give those things the legal power to operate and exist.

== Provisions of the act ==
A summary of provisions of the Act is available on the Congress.gov website and include the following:

- Authorizes annual appropriations of $17.5 billion primarily for Coast Guard activities for both fiscal years 2016 and 2017.
- Requires the Coast Guard to submit to congress a manpower requirements plan every four years.
- Makes funds available for the design and construction of an icebreaker that is capable of buoy tending to enhance icebreaking capacity on the Great Lakes, and for preacquisition activities for a new polar icebreaker.
- Sets end-of-year strength at 43,000 active duty members for FY 2016 and 2017, unchanged from FY 2015.
- Elevates the office of the vice commandant of the Coast Guard from the rank of vice admiral to admiral.
- Allows for the appointment of five vice admirals, up from four.
- Requires the implementation of a standard for tracking operational days at sea for Coast Guard cutters.
- Requires the establishment an education program, for members and employees of the Coast Guard, that offers a master's degree in maritime operations.
- Requires the use of a multi-rater assessment (to include peers and subordinates) for Flag officers and SES, and an assessment of feasibility for all other members.
- Requires a process to account for the number of safety zones established for permitted marine events and an account of Coast Guard resources to enforce these safety zones.

== Congressional Budget Office report ==
This summary is based largely on the summary provided by the Congressional Budget Office for the related bill H.R. 1987, as ordered reported by the House Committee on Transportation and Infrastructure on April 30, 2015. This is a public domain source.

This act authorizes appropriations totaling $17.5 billion, primarily for ongoing operations of the Coast Guard and FMC over the 2016-2017 period. The act amends laws that govern the activities of Coast Guard, FMC, and the Maritime Administration (MARAD) within the Department of Transportation. Assuming appropriation of the specified amounts, CBO estimates that implementing the legislation would cost $16.6 billion over the 2016-2020 period.

This act imposes private-sector mandates, as defined in the Unfunded Mandates Reform Act (UMRA), on sponsors of marine events and manufacturers of small boats. Based on information from USCG and industry experts, CBO estimates that the cost of the mandates would fall below the annual threshold in UMRA for private-sector mandates ($154 million in 2015, adjusted for inflation).

== Procedural history ==
The Coast Guard Authorization Act of 2015 was introduced into the United States House of Representatives on December 8, 2015, by Rep. Duncan Hunter (R, CA-50). It was referred to the United States House Committee on Transportation and Infrastructure and the United States House Transportation Subcommittee on Coast Guard and Maritime Transportation. It passed the House by voice vote on December 10, 2015, and the passed the Senate with an amendment by voice vote on December 18, 2015. The House agreed to the Senate amendment by voice vote on February 1, 2016. The act was signed into law by President Obama on February 8, 2016.

Prior to this, another related bill, H.R. 1987 had passed the House by voice vote on May 18, 2015.

== Debate and discussion ==
Rep. Duncan D. Hunter (R-CA) said the following in support of the bill: "The bill makes several reforms to Coast Guard authorities, as well as laws governing shipping and navigation. Specifically, the bill supports Coast Guard servicemembers, improves Coast Guard mission effectiveness, enhances oversight of the Coast Guard programs, encourages job growth in the maritime sector by cutting regulatory burdens on job creators, strengthens maritime drug enforcement laws, and increases coordination with partner nations, further strengthening port security. It does all this in a way that allows this to be brought under suspension in a bipartisan way."

Rep. John Garamendi (D-CA) was also in support of the bill, and stated the following: "It is clear that we are at the advent of Arctic operations for the Coast Guard, and it is vital that the service has the icebreaking capabilities it will need to operate safely and effectively in this very unforgiving maritime environment. The bill will advance the completion of the materiel assessment of the Polar Sea to determine, finally, if this heavy icebreaker can be returned to service. Additionally, this legislation authorized funding to allow the Coast Guard to maintain progress in developing requirements and preliminary design for a new heavy icebreaker."

"I am also pleased that this legislation includes language that will continue to preserve the remaining LORAN–C infrastructure until such time as the administration makes a final decision on whether or not to build out an enhanced LORAN or eLORAN infrastructure to provide a reliable, land-based, low-frequency backup navigation timing signal to back up GPS, the Global Positioning System."

== See also ==
- List of acts of the 114th United States Congress
