= Motor Vehicle Safety Whistleblower Act =

The Motor Vehicle Safety Whistleblower Act was passed by Congress in December 2015 as part of the Fixing America's Surface Transportation Act to provide an incentive to bring to light safety-related problems. The program allows industry insiders to report on violations of federal vehicle-safety laws and receive 10% to 30% of monetary sanctions over $1 million that the government imposes based on that information.

== Overview ==
Republican Senator John Thune of South Dakota and Democratic Senator Bill Nelson of Florida cosponsored the Motor Vehicle Safety Whistleblower Act in response to several high-profile auto safety scandals. The whistleblower program was designed to protect the public by providing an incentive for insiders working at auto manufacturers, vehicle part suppliers or dealerships to assist the U.S. Department of Transportation (DOT) and National Highway Traffic Safety Administration (NHTSA) by bringing to the Government's attention information about violations of vehicle-safety laws that are likely to cause unreasonable risk of death or serious physical injury. Whistleblowers are eligible for rewards under the Act if the information they bring forward contributes to the Government's success in an enforcement or related legal action. Awards are based on the value of a whistleblower's information and the extent of assistance provided.

The program works in concert with existing federal law to protect whistleblowers from unlawful employer retaliation. It also allows whistleblowers to keep their identities confidential when reporting violations. A whistleblower does not have to be a U.S. citizen or resident to qualify for an award, and violations he or she reports on don't have to occur in the U.S. so long as some of the vehicles, or parts, at issue are distributed in the U.S. market.

== Examples of safety violations for which whistleblowers can receive an award ==
The program applies broadly to safety-related vehicle and vehicle-equipment defects, including failures to notify the government of such defects. Examples of previous safety-related violations for which a whistleblower could have received an award under the program if he or she brought it to light include: Takata's airbag ruptures, GM's ignition switch defects, Toyota's "sticky" pedals that caused unintended acceleration, and the Early Warning Reporting (EWR) failures that affected Fiat, Chrysler, Honda, Ferrari, Triumph, and Forest River.
