= Section 831(b) =

United States tax law

Internal Revenue Code (I.R.C.) Section 831(b) is a U.S. tax law that provides specific tax benefits to certain small insurance companies, often referred to as "micro-captives". Established to encourage the formation of small insurance companies, it offers an alternative risk-management solution that can supplement or even replace traditional insurance coverage.

A micro-captive insurance company, as it pertains to Section 831(b), is a captive insurance company – an insurance company entirely owned and operated by the insured – that has elected to pay taxes only on its investment income. In other words, the micro-captive's underwriting income – the difference between earned premiums and incurred losses – is exempt from federal income tax. As of 2026, to qualify for 831(b) status, the insurance company's written premium income must not exceed $2.85 million in a given year, a threshold that is indexed for inflation.

== History ==
=== Liability Crisis ===
The liability insurance crisis of the 1980s was a watershed moment in the U.S. insurance industry, marked by a sharp rise in the cost of liability insurance and the widespread unavailability of certain types of coverage. The crisis affected numerous sectors, from construction and daycare centers, to municipal governments and non-profit organizations.

Beginning in the mid-1980s, this period was driven by a rapid rise in both liability claim frequency and severity. Insurers, confronted with escalating costs and risk exposures, responded by substantially increasing premiums. In some cases, insurers stopped offering certain types of liability coverage entirely.

The crisis led to substantial reforms, including the passage of the Tax Reform Act of 1986 which introduced Section 831(b). At the state level, many states implemented tort reform measures aimed at limiting liability and damages. These reforms, coupled with the introduction of Section 831(b), provided some relief and led to the growth of the captive insurance industry.

=== 1986 Tax Reform Act ===
The Tax Reform Act of 1986 is regarded as one of the most significant pieces of tax legislation in the history of the United States. President Ronald Reagan signed the Act into law with the goal of simplifying the tax code and expanding the tax base while also ending a variety of tax shelters and preferences. This was a significant step that helped to bring more fairness to the tax code. Notably, under this legislation the top marginal individual income tax rate was reduced from 50% to 28%, the lowest it had been since 1916.

A key aspect of this Act was the introduction of Section 831(b), which specifically pertained to the taxation of certain small insurance companies, also known as "micro-captives". Prior to the Act, insurance companies were taxed on their income in a very similar manner as other corporations. However, Section 831(b) changed this by allowing small insurance companies with annual premiums of $1.2 million or less (a figure that has since been adjusted for inflation) to opt for an alternative tax calculation.

The introduction of Section 831(b) in the Tax Reform Act of 1986 has had far-reaching impacts on the insurance industry, leading to a rise in the formation of micro-captive insurance companies and providing a tax-advantaged strategy for businesses to manage a broad array of risks.

=== 2015 PATH Act ===
The Protecting Americans from Tax Hikes Act of 2015, commonly known as the PATH Act, was a significant piece of tax legislation in the United States. The act was designed to provide tax relief for families and businesses, and it made several tax provisions permanent.

One of the changes implemented by the PATH Act was an amendment to Section 831(b) of the Internal Revenue Code. This amendment, which took effect in 2017, was aimed at enhancing and modernizing the micro-captive insurance industry.

The PATH Act increased the annual premium limit for qualifying small insurance companies from $1.2 million to $2.2 million, adjusting for inflation. This increase in the cap allowed small insurance companies to write more business and still qualify for the benefits provided under Section 831(b), therefore providing more flexibility and adaptability for businesses leveraging captive insurance structures.

In addition to the premium limit increase, the PATH Act introduced diversification requirements to Section 831(b) to prevent abuses of micro-captives for estate planning purposes. These new rules, often referred to as the "ownership test" and the "risk distribution test," ensure that the ownership of a captive insurance company does not disproportionately benefit any single party and that risk is adequately distributed.

Overall the PATH Act has had a significant impact on the 831(b) tax code, modernizing it to better suit the evolving needs of small businesses and bolster the integrity of micro-captive arrangements. These changes have further incentivized the use of micro-captives as a strategic risk management tool while also introducing safeguards to prevent misuse.

== IRS Scrutiny ==
=== Dirty Dozen ===
The Internal Revenue Service (IRS) publishes an annual "Dirty Dozen" list to alert taxpayers to common scams and schemes that could lead to tax fraud or other illegal activities. This list, typically released during tax season, identifies a variety of common scams, such as phishing, false tax returns, and tax preparer fraud.

The Dirty Dozen list also frequently includes more complex tax structures that the IRS believes are being abused. One such structure that has repeatedly made the list in recent years is the micro-captive insurance company operating under Section 831(b) of the Internal Revenue Code.

Micro-captives are included on this list because the IRS has identified some cases where they have been used for purposes other than genuine risk management. Some businesses have allegedly used them to attempt to circumvent tax laws and shelter income. In these cases, the IRS alleges that the insurance contracts don't represent a valid risk transfer and that the premiums charged are unreasonably high compared to the risk insured, making the arrangement seem more like a disguised way to distribute profits rather than a legitimate insurance setup.

It's important to note that the inclusion of micro-captives on the Dirty Dozen list does not mean that all micro-captives are illegitimate. Many businesses use micro-captives in compliance with the law as a valuable tool for risk management. However, the IRS scrutiny highlights the need for proper setup and operation of these entities, including meeting risk distribution and risk transfer criteria, and setting premiums through a formal underwriting process.

Any business considering forming a micro-captive, or any that currently operates one, should work with knowledgeable professionals to ensure compliance with the law. If the IRS determines that a micro-captive is not operating in compliance with the rules of Section 831(b), the tax benefits could be denied, and substantial penalties could be imposed.

=== Notice 2016–66 ===
IRS Notice 2016–66, issued in November 2016, designated certain micro-captive transactions as "Transactions of Interest," signaling increased scrutiny of these arrangements by the Internal Revenue Service (IRS). The notice was in response to the perceived misuse of micro-captive insurance companies to avoid tax obligations.

In general a Transaction of Interest is a type of reportable transaction that the IRS believes has the potential for tax avoidance or evasion, but for which it lacks enough information to specifically label as a tax avoidance transaction.

With Notice 2016–66, the IRS was particularly interested in micro-captive insurance companies that made an election under Section 831(b) to be taxed only on investment income and where the liabilities for insured losses and claim administration expenses were less than 70% of the earned premiums, or where the captive made certain ceding payments to other entities.

The immediate impact of this notice on the micro-captive industry was significant:

Increased Reporting Requirements
The parties involved in these micro-captive transactions are required to disclose their participation to the IRS. Material advisors, such as those who provide tax advice or assistance in relation to these transactions, are also required to keep lists of clients involved in these transactions.

Potential Penalties
Failure to disclose these transactions could result in significant penalties. For businesses, the penalty could be up to 75% of the decrease in tax as a result of the transaction, with a minimum penalty of $5,000 for individuals and $10,000 for entities.

Increased Scrutiny
Notice 2016–66 indicated that the IRS would be closely examining these transactions. This increased the likelihood of audits for businesses involved in micro-captive transactions and could result in challenges to the claimed tax benefits.

Re-evaluation of Micro-captive Strategies
As a result of the notice, many businesses re-evaluated their micro-captive strategies to ensure compliance with IRS requirements and the proper operation of their insurance companies.

Despite the increased scrutiny and reporting requirements, micro-captives continue to be used as effective risk management tools for many businesses. However, the notice underscores the importance of operating these entities in a manner consistent with insurance industry standards and in compliance with the tax code.

=== CIC Services suit ===
In response to IRS Notice 2016–66, CIC Services, LLC, a firm that assists with the formation and management of captive insurance companies, filed a lawsuit against the IRS and the United States Department of the Treasury seeking to prohibit enforcement of the notice. The company argued that the notice imposed significant reporting requirements and potential penalties without providing an opportunity for public comment and review.

Initially the U.S. District Court and the Sixth Circuit Court of Appeals ruled against CIC Services, citing the Anti-Injunction Act, which generally prohibits lawsuits to restrain the assessment or collection of taxes.

But CIC Services appealed the decision to the Supreme Court of the United States. In May 2021, in the case CIC Services, LLC v. Internal Revenue Service, the Supreme court ruled in favor of CIC Services in a 9–0 decision, determining that the Anti-Injunction Act did not bar the company's suit.

The Supreme Court's decision did not immediately nullify Notice 2016–66 but allowed CIC Services to proceed with its case against the IRS on the grounds that the IRS had violated the Administrative Procedure Act by not providing a notice and comment period before issuing Notice 2016–66.

Following the Supreme Court's ruling, the case was remanded back to the district court. In December 2021 the U.S. District Court for the Eastern District of Tennessee ruled in favor of CIC Services, finding that the IRS had indeed violated the Administrative Procedure Act in issuing Notice 2016–66 without a notice and comment period. The court therefore vacated Notice 2016–66.

=== Soft Letter Warnings ===
An IRS soft letter is a type of communication used by the Internal Revenue Service to inform taxpayers about changes in tax law, suggest changes to their tax reporting, provide information on their reported tax items, or identify areas where it sees potential non-compliance. Unlike a formal audit letter, a soft letter is not a binding legal demand, but rather an advisory or informational notice.

Soft letters can also serve as an indirect audit tool. They may not assert tax liability, but they signal to the recipient that the IRS is closely watching the issue at hand and might take more serious steps, such as an audit, if the perceived non-compliance continues.

In the spring of 2020 the IRS sent soft letters to numerous taxpayers who participate in micro-captive insurance transactions, specifically those operating under Section 831(b) of the Internal Revenue Code. These letters (specifically Letter 6336) were sent to taxpayers suspected of participating in captive insurance arrangements that the IRS views as potentially abusive.

The soft letters urged taxpayers involved in these transactions to reassess their position with the micro-captive insurance structure, especially in light of adverse court decisions against certain micro-captive arrangements, and to consult independent tax advisors. The IRS letter suggested taxpayers consider whether it was appropriate to continue claiming tax benefits associated with the captive insurance arrangement and recommended that taxpayers may want to amend prior year tax returns if their position was inconsistent with recent court decisions.

The timing of the IRS soft letter (Letter 6336) in the Spring of 2020 coincided with the onset of the COVID-19 pandemic, which created an extremely challenging environment for businesses, including those involved with 831(b) micro-captives. Many of these businesses were dealing with a surge in claims related to the pandemic and disruptions to their operations, all while grappling with the implications of the IRS's scrutiny.

=== Standard settlement offer ===
In early 2021 the Internal Revenue Service (IRS) issued a settlement offer for taxpayers under audit who participated in micro-captive insurance transactions, specifically those operating under Section 831(b) of the Internal Revenue Code. This came after the IRS's success in several U.S. Tax Court cases challenging these types of transactions.

This standard settlement offer represented the IRS's latest approach to resolving ongoing audits of micro-captive insurance transactions. The terms of the offer reflected the IRS's view that a significant number of these transactions had not complied with federal tax laws. It aimed to expedite resolution and limit further administrative and legal costs for both the IRS and taxpayers.

=== Proposed regulations ===
On April 10, 2023 the U.S. Treasury Department announced new proposed rules on micro-captive insurance. Under the draft rules, certain micro-captive transactions have been identified as listed transactions or transactions of interest under the relevant disclosure rules.

The new micro-captive insurance rules were published as a response to the agency's loss in the case of CIC Services, LLC v. IRS. In this case, the U.S. District Court for the Eastern District of Tennessee threw out the previously published IRS Notice 2016–66. The court found that the IRS had failed to comply with the Administrative Procedure Act when publishing the notice.

=== Final Regulations (2025) ===
On January 14, 2025, the Internal Revenue Service and United States Department of the Treasury published final regulations (T.D. 10029) on micro-captive insurance arrangements, establishing a revised framework for identifying and reporting potentially abusive micro-captive transactions. The regulations classify certain arrangements as either “listed transactions” (mandatory disclosure as abusive tax shelters) or “transactions of interest” (potentially abusive, subject to reporting requirements).

In response to public comments — including references to prior Tax Court decisions involving micro-captive arrangements — the IRS revised the loss ratio thresholds from those proposed in earlier rulemaking. Under the final regulations, a micro-captive may be classified as a listed transaction if the loss ratio falls below 30%, and as a transaction of interest if the loss ratio falls below 60%.

One day prior to the final regulations, on January 13, 2025, the IRS issued Revenue Procedure 2025-13, providing a process for certain captives to revoke their Section 831(b) election. The procedure outlines eligibility and administrative steps for revocation and the tax treatment of affected entities following such revocation.

=== Loper Bright and Chevron Deference (2024) ===
In June 2024, the Supreme Court of the United States issued its decision in Loper Bright Enterprises v. Raimondo, 144 S. Ct. 2244 (2024), overruling the longstanding Chevron doctrine. Under Chevron, courts had deferred to a federal agency’s reasonable interpretation of ambiguous statutes; the Court held that such deference is not required under the Administrative Procedure Act.

This ruling has implications for judicial review of federal agency rulemaking, including regulations issued by the Internal Revenue Service, as courts must independently interpret statutory provisions rather than defer to agency interpretations.

=== SRA 831(b) Admin v. IRS (2025) ===
In 2025, SRA 831(b) Admin, along with Drake Insurance Co. and Drake Plastics Ltd. Co., filed a federal lawsuit challenging the IRS’s January 2025 final regulations on micro-captive insurance. The complaint alleges that the regulations are arbitrary and capricious and exceed the agency’s statutory authority.

As of 2026, the case remains pending, and its outcome may affect the implementation and enforcement of the January 2025 regulations, particularly in light of changes to judicial review standards following Loper Bright.

== Notable court cases ==
The following cases represent significant judicial decisions addressing the legitimacy of micro-captive insurance arrangements under Section 831(b). Courts have consistently evaluated these arrangements against three core criteria: (1) genuine risk transfer, (2) adequate risk distribution, and (3) operation in the commonly accepted sense of an insurance company.

=== Drake Plastics Ltd. Co. & SRA 831(b) Admin v. Internal Revenue Service (2026) ===
On April 15, 2026, a federal district court judge in Texas vacated portions of an Internal Revenue Service rule governing micro-captive insurance arrangements, including the “listed transaction” designation applicable to certain arrangements. The court held that the IRS had not adequately supported its determination that such arrangements should be presumptively treated as abusive transactions under applicable administrative law standards. The vacatur was set to take effect on May 1, 2026.

=== Avrahami v. Commissioner (2017) ===
In Avrahami v. Commissioner, the United States Tax Court ruled in favor of the IRS in one of the first cases addressing Section 831(b) micro-captive insurance arrangements. The court found that the captive arrangement lacked the characteristics of insurance for federal tax purposes, citing issues including non-arm’s-length premium setting, lack of risk distribution, and deficiencies in the reinsurance structure.

=== Reserve Mechanical Corp. v. Commissioner (2018; aff’d 2022) ===
In Reserve Mechanical Corp. v. Commissioner, the Tax Court ruled against the taxpayer, finding that the captive insurer did not achieve sufficient risk distribution and that its reinsurance arrangements lacked economic substance. The court also found that the arrangement did not constitute insurance in the commonly accepted sense.

The decision was affirmed by the United States Court of Appeals for the Tenth Circuit in 2022.

=== Syzygy Insurance Co. v. Commissioner (2019) ===
In Syzygy Insurance Co. v. Commissioner, the Tax Court held that the captive insurer did not operate as a bona fide insurance company and that its arrangements did not constitute insurance for federal tax purposes. The court identified deficiencies in underwriting, claims handling, and premium determination.

=== Puglisi Egg Farms of Delaware, LLC v. Commissioner (2021) ===
In Puglisi Egg Farms of Delaware, LLC v. Commissioner, the IRS conceded its case prior to trial, withdrawing proposed adjustments and penalties related to a micro-captive insurance arrangement. The case has been cited in discussions of micro-captive insurance due to the IRS’s decision not to pursue the matter further.

=== Keating v. Commissioner (2024) ===
In Keating v. Commissioner, T.C. Memo 2024-2, the Tax Court ruled against the taxpayer, concluding that the captive insurer did not operate as a bona fide insurance company and disallowing associated deductions.

=== Swift v. Commissioner (2024; aff’d 2025) ===
In Swift v. Commissioner, T.C. Memo 2024-13, the Tax Court held that the captive arrangement failed to achieve risk distribution and did not qualify as insurance. The decision was affirmed by the United States Court of Appeals for the Fifth Circuit in 2025.

=== Patel v. Commissioner (2024) ===
In Patel v. Commissioner, the Tax Court ruled against the taxpayers, finding that the captive insurance arrangements lacked sufficient risk distribution and did not function as insurance for federal tax purposes.

=== Royalty Management Insurance Co. v. Commissioner (2024) ===
In Royalty Management Insurance Co. v. Commissioner, the Tax Court concluded that the captive insurer did not operate as a bona fide insurance company and disallowed deductions related to the arrangement.

=== CMF Insurance Co. v. Commissioner (2025) ===
In CMF Insurance Co. v. Commissioner, the Tax Court evaluated the structure and operations of a micro-captive insurance arrangement and addressed issues including risk distribution, premium determination, and operational practices. The decision has been cited in ongoing analysis of micro-captive insurance litigation and regulatory standards.
