= Commerce, Justice, Science, and Related Agencies Appropriations Act, 2016 =

The Commerce, Justice, Science, and Related Agencies Appropriations Act, 2016 is the appropriations bill for the Department of Commerce, Department of Justice, NASA, the National Science Foundation, the Office of Science and Technology Policy, and several independent agencies for the fiscal year 2016.

== Legislative history ==
The bill was introduced in the House as H.R. 2578, which passed the House on June 3, 2015. On June 16, the Senate Committee on Appropriations reported the bill to the full Senate with amendments. It later became Division B of the Consolidated Appropriations Act, 2016, H.R. 2029, which was signed into law by President Barack Obama on December 18, 2015.

== Line items ==
Line item	Enacted amount
Department of Commerce
International Trade Administration	$493,000,000
Bureau of Industry and Security	$112,500,000
Economic Development Administration: economic development assistance programs	$222,000,000
Economic Development Administration: salaries and expenses	$39,000,000
Minority Business Development Agency	$32,000,000
Economic and Statistical Analysis	$109,000,000
Bureau of the Census: current surveys and programs	$270,000,000
Bureau of the Census: periodic censuses and programs	$1,100,000,000
National Telecommunications and Information Administration	$39,500,000
United States Patent and Trademark Office	$3,272,000,000
National Institute of Standards and Technology: scientific and technical research and services	$690,000,000
National Institute of Standards and Technology: industrial technology services	$155,000,000
National Institute of Standards and Technology: construction of research facilities	$119,000,000
National Oceanic and Atmospheric Administration: operations, research, and facilities	$3,305,813,000
National Oceanic and Atmospheric Administration: procurement, acquisition and construction	$2,400,416,000
National Oceanic and Atmospheric Administration: pacific coastal salmon recovery	$65,000,000
National Oceanic and Atmospheric Administration: fishermen's contingency fund	$350,000
Departmental Management: salaries and expenses	$58,000,000
Departmental Management: renovation and modernization	$19,062,000
Departmental Management: office of inspector general	$32,000,000
Department of Justice
General Administration: salaries and expenses	$111,500,000
General Administration: justice information sharing technology	$31,000,000
General Administration: administrative review and appeals	$426,791,000
General Administration: office of inspector general	$93,709,000
United States Parole Commission	$13,308,000
Legal Activities: general legal activities	$893,000,000
Legal Activities: antitrust division	$164,977,000
Legal Activities: United States attorneys	$2,000,000,000
Legal Activities: United States trustee system fund	$225,908,000
Legal Activities: foreign claims settlement commission	$2,374,000
Legal Activities: fees and expenses of witnesses	$270,000,000
Legal Activities: community relations service	$14,446,000
Legal Activities: assets forfeiture fund	$20,514,000
United States Marshals Service: salaries and expenses	$1,230,581,000
United States Marshals Service: construction	$15,000,000
United States Marshals Service: federal prisoner detention	$1,454,414,000
National Security Division	$95,000,000
Interagency Law Enforcement	$512,000,000
Federal Bureau of Investigation: salaries and expenses	$8,489,786,000
Federal Bureau of Investigation: construction	$308,982,000
Drug Enforcement Administration	$2,080,000,000
Bureau of Alcohol, Tobacco, Firearms and Explosives	$1,240,000,000
Federal Prison System: salaries and expenses	$6,948,500,000
Federal Prison System: buildings and facilities	$530,000,000,
Office on Violence Against Women	$480,000,000
Office of Justice Programs: research, evaluation and statistics	$116,000,000
Office of Justice Programs: juvenile justice programs	$270,160,000
Community Oriented Policing Services	$212,000,000
Science
Office of Science and Technology Policy	$5,555,000
National Aeronautics and Space Administration: science	$5,589,400,000
National Aeronautics and Space Administration: aeronautics	$640,000,000
National Aeronautics and Space Administration: space technology	$686,500,000
National Aeronautics and Space Administration: exploration	$4,030,000,000
National Aeronautics and Space Administration: space operations	$5,029,200,000
National Aeronautics and Space Administration: education	$115,000,000
National Aeronautics and Space Administration: safety, security and mission services	$2,768,600,000
National Aeronautics and Space Administration: construction and environmental compliance and restoration	$388,900,000
National Aeronautics and Space Administration: office of inspector general	$37,400,000
National Science Foundation: research and related activities	$6,033,645,000
National Science Foundation: major research equipment and facilities	$200,310,000
National Science Foundation: education and human resources	$880,000,000
National Science Foundation: agency operations and award management	$330,000,000
National Science Foundation: office of the national science board	$4,370,000
National Science Foundation: office of inspector general	$15,160,000
Related Agencies
Commission on Civil Rights	$9,200,000
Equal Employment Opportunity Commission	$364,500,000
International Trade Commission	$88,500,000
Legal Services Corporation	$385,000,000
Marine Mammal Commission	$3,431,000
Office of the United States Trade Representative	$54,500,000
State Justice Institute	$5,121,000
