= Commercial Space Launch Competitiveness Act of 2015 =

Allows US industries to exploit space resources

U.S. Commercial Space Launch Act of 2015
- Other short titles: Space Resource Exploration and Utilization Act of 2015, Spurring Private Aerospace Competitiveness and Entrepreneurship Act of 2015
- Long title: To facilitate a pro-growth environment for the developing commercial space industry by encouraging private sector investment and creating more stable and predictable regulatory conditions, and for other purposes
- Nicknames: SPACE Act of 2015
- Enacted by: the 114th United States Congress
- Effective: 25 November 2015; 9 years ago

Citations
- Public law: Pub. L. 114–90 (text) (PDF)

Legislative history
- Introduced in the House as H.R. 2262 by Kevin McCarthy (R-CA) on May 12, 2015; Committee consideration by House Science, Space, and Technology, Senate Commerce, Science, and Transportation; Passed the House on May 21, 2015 (284–133); Passed the Senate on November 11, 2015 (unanimous consent) with amendment; House agreed to Senate amendment on November 16, 2015 (voice vote); Signed into law by President Barack Obama on November 25, 2015

The Commercial Space Launch Competitiveness Act, sometimes referred to as the Spurring Private Aerospace Competitiveness and Entrepreneurship (SPACE) Act of 2015, is an update of the United States Government of its commercial space use, legislated in 2015. The update to US law explicitly allows US citizens and industries to "engage in the commercial exploration and exploitation of space resources" including water and minerals. The right does not extend to extraterrestrial life, so anything that is alive may not be exploited commercially.

== Overview ==
The law was passed on May 21, 2015 to allow US industries to "engage in the commercial exploration and exploitation of space resources", but it asserts that "the United States does not [by this Act] assert sovereignty, or sovereign or exclusive rights or jurisdiction over, or the ownership of, any celestial body." Some scholars argue that the United States recognizing ownership of space resources is an act of sovereignty, and that the act violates the Outer Space Treaty. This has created a controversy on claims and on mining rights for profit. The SPACE Act includes the extension of indemnification of US launch providers for extraordinary catastrophic third-party losses of a failed launch through 2025, while the previous indemnification law was scheduled to expire in 2016. The Act also extends, through 2023, the "learning period" restrictions which limit the ability of the Federal Aviation Administration (FAA) to enact regulations regarding the safety of spaceflight participants. Indemnification for extraordinary third-party losses has, as of 2015, been a component of US space law for over 25 years, and during this time, "has never been invoked in any commercial launch mishap."

Businessweek has summarized one effect of the legislation as "American citizens could keep anything they brought back from space."

== Legislative history ==
Part of the origin of the law lies in the proposed Asteroids Act (H. R. 5063) introduced by Representatives Bill Posey (R-FL) and Derek Kilmer (D-WA) in July 2014. That act was supported by lobbying efforts by Planetary Resources, a Washington-based company that hopes to commercially mine asteroids. Additional lobbying by Deep Space Industries and Bigelow Resources, two other companies with commercial interests in space, helped the proposed Asteroids Act along, which was later rolled into the SPACE Act.

The House of Representatives passed the legislation in May 2015 and the Senate subsequently passed similar legislation. The legislation was reconciled between the House of Representatives and the Senate, then moved to the executive branch for signing or vetoing before 20 November 2015. President Obama signed the legislation into law on 25 November 2015.

== See also ==
- Guano Islands Act
- Moon Treaty
- Outer Space Treaty
- Space law
- Timeline of private spaceflight
