= National Park Foundation =

Official charity of the U.S. National Park Service

- Founded: December 18, 1967
- Founder: NPF was established by an act of Congress
- Type: 501(c)(3)
- Location: Washington, D.C.
- Region served: U.S. national parks
- Key people: Jeff Reinbold (President and CEO)
- Website: nationalparks.org

The National Park Foundation (NPF) is the official charity of the National Park Service (NPS) and its national park sites. The NPF was chartered by Congress in 1967 with a charge to "further the conservation of natural, scenic, historic, scientific, educational, inspirational, or recreational resources for future generations of Americans." The NPF raises private funds for the benefit of, or in connection with, the activities and services of the National Park Service.

== History ==
Although the federal government had already created protected landscapes and national parks, the National Park Service was not created by Congress until 1916. Following the formal establishment of national parks by Congress, there was not a clear system for private citizens to directly support the parks, whether it be through financial contributions or land donation. In 1967, Congress addressed this by passing public law 90-209, which established the National Park Foundation as the official charity of the National Park Service.

=== Projects ===
In December 2016, the National Park Foundation, in conjunction with the National Park Service, announced their plans for a revitalization of Fort Wayne in Detroit, Michigan. The foundation was awarded a $265,000 grant from the Kresge Foundation, which went towards hiring consultants to work with city officials on planning the redevelopment of the site. In 2021, the city of Detroit announced that it had reached a deal with the NPS to allow redevelopment of the site.

NPF launched the "Find Your Park/Encuenta Tu Parque" movement in March 2015. The movement is part of a larger effort to increase accessibility and visitorship among people of color, people experiencing poverty, LGBTQ people, and other underrepresented groups. In August 2018, L.L.Bean donated $3 million to the National Park Foundation to support the foundation's movement to raise awareness about the importance of the 400 national parks across the United States.

In 2016, NPF and Grand Teton National Park Foundation raised $23 million in private funds, matched by $23 million from the Land and Water Conservation Fund, to purchase a 640-acre tract of land within Grand Teton National Park from the State of Wyoming. The land, known as Antelope Flats, is primarily sagebrush steppe. The state authorized the sale of the land in the spring of 2016 through the end of the year. NPF, Grand Teton National Park Foundation, and the Land and Water Conservation Fund worked together to secure the $46 million in funding before the deadline.

Roxanne Quimby, founder of Burt's Bees, along with her family, donated more than 87,000 acres (136 mi^{2}) of woodlands in northern Maine, which became Katahdin Woods and Waters National Monument. The gift was facilitated through the National Park Foundation as part of the Centennial Campaign for America's National Parks. President Obama designated the land as a national monument on August 24, 2016.

Through its Flight 93 National Memorial Capital Campaign, the National Park Foundation raised more than $40 million in private support from more than 110,000 individuals, foundations and corporations. Funds were used to design and construct the Tower of Voices and establish the land as a national park, including reforestation of the landscape. Additional construction through 2015 included a visitor center complex consisting of a permanent artifact exhibition, learning center, flight path, and memorial walls. The construction was completed in 2018.

==== Dr. Martin Luther King, Jr. properties ====
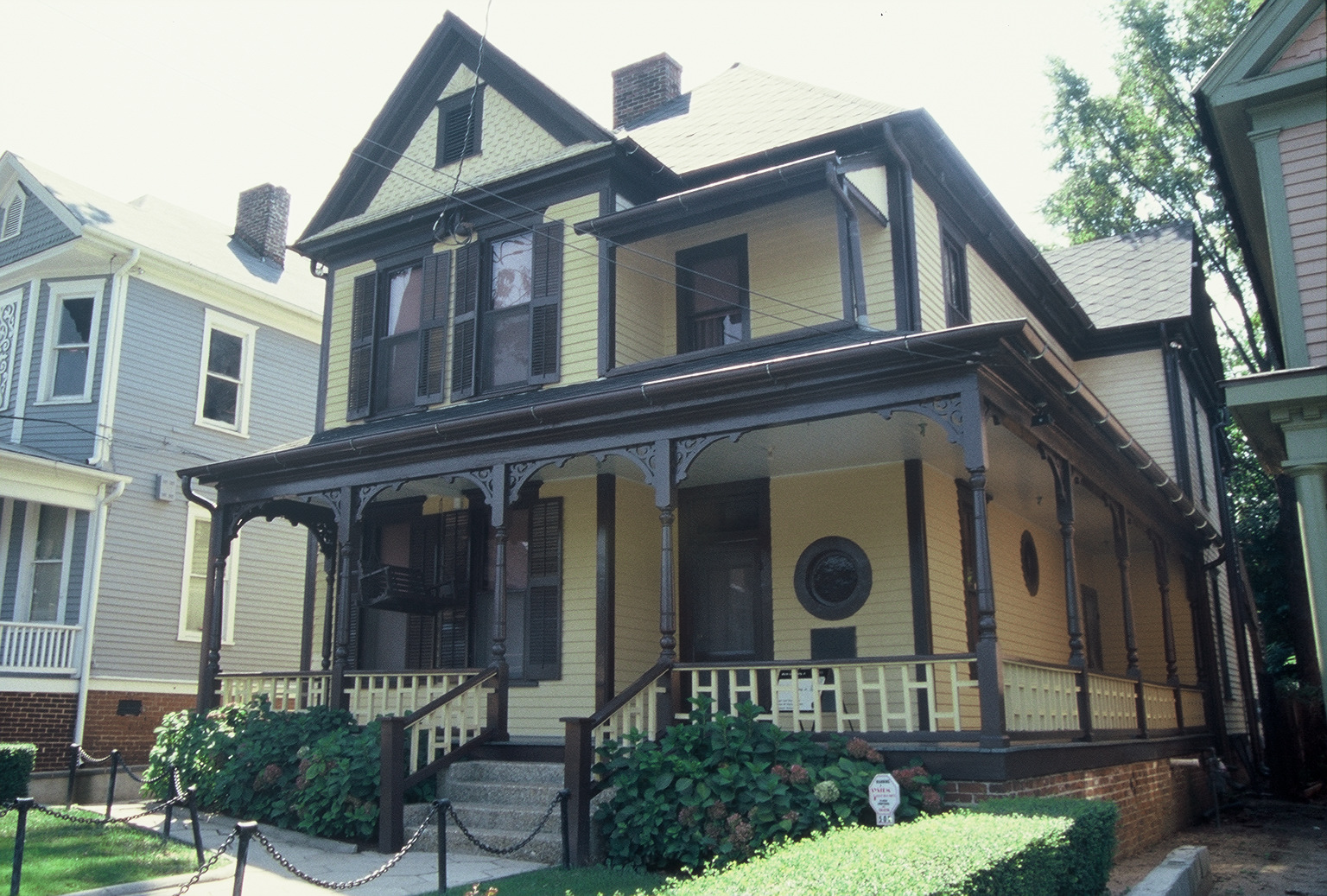
Dr. Martin Luther King Jr.'s birthplace in Atlanta, Georgia

The National Park Foundation has several ongoing projects that lend to its history of preserving park lands, natural sites, and historical sites in America. Since late 2018, the NPF has had a growing involvement with maintaining the legacy of Martin Luther King Jr. and establishing a connection with his family. In December 2018, the NPF purchased the home where Martin Luther King Jr. was born in 1929. The home had been declared a National Historic Site by Congress in 1980, and in 1982, the National Park Service began offering tours of the home, which is located at 501 Auburn Avenue NE in Atlanta, Georgia. The home was built in 1895 and purchased by King's maternal grandfather in 1905 for $3,500. The home was sold to the NPF for an undisclosed amount. The NPF purchased another property once owned by King and Coretta Scott King at 234 Sunset Avenue in Atlanta's Vine City neighborhood. The last home that King lived at with his family, it was sold to the foundation in January 2019. King had moved there in 1965, and his children grew up there. The property was purchased from the estate of King's widow for $400,000 and transferred to the National Park Service. The house will undergo repairs and restoration before it is opened to the public.

== Grants and programs ==
The NPF works in partnership with companies and organizations that wish to support the parks by delegating donations through one of foundation's programs and creating grants that honor the company's mission or values and benefit the parks and visitors. Additional donations that are not assigned to one of the programs help fund media and promotions, communication with partners, and park maintenance. The NPF has received support from partners such as: L.L. Bean, Union Pacific Railroad, Disney, and Subaru.

In 2016, the NPF conducted a fundraising campaign titled "The Centennial Campaign for America’s National Parks," which raised more than $500 million in support of national parks and programs. In 2024, the Lilly Endowment donated $100 million to the National Park Foundation to support more than 400 national park sites.

Past and present NPF programs have included:

=== The African American Experience Fund ===
Established in 2001, the African American Experience Fund (AAEF) helps preserve African American history and culture, and the stories of the individuals and the national park sites they care for under the AAEF. The fund works to reach a broader audience through public engagement with the parks. AAEF supports and highlights sites including the Tuskegee Airmen National Historic Site and Tuskegee Institute National Historic Site, Martin Luther King, Jr. National Historic Site, and the New Orleans Jazz National Historical Park. In total, more than 30 national parks and monuments are designated as African American Heritage Sites.

=== Best Idea Program ===
The America's Best Ideas Program was launched by the National Park Foundation following the airing of the documentary by Ken Burns, The National Parks: America’s Best Idea in 2009. The program aimed to provide underprivileged youth with opportunities to engage with National Parks through opportunities like internships. The program also created programs and activities in parks to educate visitors on park history and impact. Grants from the program included summer camps for children with developmental disorders, trips for Native American children to engage with their tribal history, and internships for homeless high school students. This program has since ended.

=== The Ticket to Ride Program ===
The Ticket to Ride Program was created in 2011 by the National Park Foundation in order to provide students and youth with transportation to the national parks as a result of field trips being a financial burden for many schools and youth groups. In 2013, the NPF partnered with the Disney Worldwide Conservation Fund to provide grants through the Ticket to Ride Program. Kennesaw Mountain National Battlefield Park was able to provide 400 students in Douglas Country, Georgia with transportation to the park where they participated in programs centered around American Civil War history. In 2014, the NPF awarded Biscayne National Park a grant through the Ticket to Ride Program that allowed for 1,500 students at Title I schools transportation to the park. Biscayne was able to use the funding to create educational programs that focused on the park's wildlife for the students to participate in. Overall, 65 parks were provided with transportation funding that same year. This program has ended.

=== The Latino Heritage Fund ===
The Latino Heritage Fund, established in 2011, and known as the American Latino Heritage Fund until 2015, was started by the NPF to preserve Latino heritage and culture at national park sites and engage Latino communities. As of 2013, only 10% of park visitors were Latino. The Latino Heritage Fund works to increase attendance through educating and involving youth with sites and events that focus on Latino history. The NPF has also organized the funding and supported the National Park Service's establishment of more sites and monuments that celebrate individuals like Cesar Chavez in an effort to highlight Latino history within America.

=== Open Outdoors for Kids ===
The NPF's Open Outdoors for Kids program began in 2011 and aims to provide park access specifically to youth. With NPF workers based in different U.S. cities, Open Outdoors for Kids also works to increase community awareness of the importance of outdoor activity for kids. In the fall of 2017, the NPF provided the Northwest Youth Corps and Idaho Conservation Corps with a $290,000 grant so that members could have access to eight National Parks and fund further education on the parks' preservation and conservation. Teachers and youth leaders have the ability to book trips and organize funding through the grants made available by NPF. These grants are sometimes known as "field trip grants" because they are used by schools to provide young students the opportunity to not only see, but also engage with a national park. In March 2020, The National Park Foundation announced that it has engaged more than a million students in educational programs with national parks across the country since it established the program.

=== Service Corps ===
Between 2018 and 2021, NPF provided more than $11 million to support more than 130 service corps crews. The crews provide on-the-job training and complete projects in national parks ranging from trail maintenance and habitat restoration to trash and litter removal. The effort helps address deferred maintenance in national parks. Additionally, NPF works with the Corps Network to increase crews that are inclusive of women, as well as LGBTQ and BIPOC people.

=== Women in Parks ===
The Women In Parks program raises funds for national parks and park programs that highlight stories of women who made history. Projects include the production of online oral histories of the women of the Northern Arapaho tribe and their indigenous history at the Cache la Poudre River National Heritage Area; an exhibit dedicated to the wife of Martin Luther King Jr., Coretta Scott King, at the Martin Luther King, Jr. National Historical Park; and preservation of the National Woman's Party historic headquarters in Washington, D.C. To mark the 100th anniversary of the 19th Amendment, the NPF distributed $460,000 in grants to parks where significant events in women's history in the United States occurred.

== Related legislation ==
=== National Park Service 100th Anniversary Commemorative Coin Act ===
On February 13, 2013, Rep. Erik Paulsen introduced into the United States House of Representatives the National Park Service 100th Anniversary Commemorative Coin Act (H.R. 627; 113th Congress), a bill that would direct the Secretary of the Treasury to mint and issue gold, silver, and half-dollar clad coins in commemoration of the 100th anniversary of the establishment of the National Park Service (NPS). The coins would all have a surcharge attached, the money from which would be given to the National Park Foundation. Paulsen argued that "even during tough economic times, it's important to find new, cost-effective ways to preserve these treasures for future generations to learn from and enjoy." President and CEO of the National Park Foundation Neil Mulholland said that "the commemorative coins would be a special way for individuals to mark this significant milestone while simultaneously providing incredible support to these cherished places." The bill passed in the House in April 2014 and was referred to the United States Senate. Similar legislation (S. 1158) was also introduced into the United States Senate. A version of the bill was incorporated into the Carl Levin and Howard P. "Buck" McKeon National Defense Authorization Act for Fiscal Year 2015, which President Barack Obama signed into law on December 14, 2014.

=== National Park Service Centennial Act ===
On March 3, 2016, Rep. Rob Bishop (R-UT) introduced the National Park Service Centennial Act (H.R. 4680), which was signed into law by President Barack Obama on December 16, 2016 (P.L. 114–289). Among other items, the bill codified the National Park Centennial Challenge Fund to finance construction, maintenance, and education programs and projects with matching private dollars. In addition, the bill established the Second Century Endowment for the National Park Service, which utilizes funds from sales of Federal Recreational Lands Passes, as well as private dollars, to fund an endowment held by the National Park Foundation. Further, the legislation updated the charter of the National Park Foundation, added a General Chairman to the National Association of Tribal Historic Preservation Officers, provided for technical corrections to existing NPS laws, created the ability of the Department of the Interior to award and administer commercial use contracts under a new visitor experience improvement authority, and extended the Historic Preservation Fund through fiscal year 2023. The updates to the National Park Foundation charter included authorization of funding of up to $5 million per year, requiring a 1:1 private match, through fiscal year 2023. Additionally, the bill authorized up to $5 million per year, through fiscal year 2023.

=== Great American Outdoors Act ===
In 2020, the United States Congress passed the Great American Outdoors Act, a piece of legislation which will provide $9.5 billion in funding over five years to address the backlog of needed maintenance across the national parks. In an opinion piece published by Fox News, NPF's president and CEO Will Shafroth wrote that the bill would help free up private funds to focus on improving accessibility to parks and visitor experience, as well as habitat, wildlife and cultural preservation.

== Effects of government shutdowns on funding and operations of U.S. national parks ==
The 2019 U.S. government shutdown lasted from December 22, 2018, to January 25, 2019, and impacted several areas of the government, which included the National Park Service—and by extension, nonprofits like the National Park Foundation. News outlets reported on damage inflicted on parks because Park Service staff were unable to work during the shutdown, as the parks remained open without staff to attend to them. Services that were suspended included trash clean-up and road maintenance. On January 7, 2019, National Park Foundation president Will Shafroth announced the launch of a fundraising drive as a proactive measure, so that the NPS would be able to commence restoration efforts as soon as the parks reopened.

== See also ==
- National Parks Conservation Association
