= Swanson Industries =

American oil industry manufacturing company

- Type: Privately-held
- Industry: Fluid power, mining, steel, construction, remanufacturing, engineering, hydraulic
- Founded: 1964
- Headquarters: Morgantown, West Virginia, United States
- Key people: Paul Swanson, Steve Sangalli
- Products: hydraulic pumps, chrome plating, friction welding, laser welding, longwall mine shield refurbishment, cylinder manufacturing, cylinder repair, industrial supplies, motors and valves
- Number of employees: 500
- Website: www.swansonindustries.com

Swanson Industries, Inc. is an American company that manufactures, remanufactures and repairs hydraulic cylinders for the mining and industrial industries. It is also a producer of hydraulic, drilling and mining products and mechanical parts. It was officially incorporated in 1999 and is headquartered in Morgantown, WV.

Other manufacturing sites are located in Pennsylvania, Utah, Kentucky, Montana, Chile and China.

== Background ==
=== History ===
Founded in 1964 as Swanson Plating Company, and later known as CWS Company, it was not until under new ownership in 1999 that the company was renamed to Swanson Industries, Inc. The new ownership felt the name change was necessary after merging with companies Morgantown Machine & Hydraulics, Laser Processing Company and Morgantown Technical Services (MTS). MTS, for example, provides rebuild services for longwall shield in the coal industry. Swanson Industries has entered the industry of hydraulic, machining and plating services.

In 2006, Swanson Industries, Inc. added hydraulic cylinder manufacturing to its services, going from repair of hydraulic cylinders used in deep mining to remanufacture to manufacturing. AEA Investors would be added as an equity partner in 2012, backing Swanson Industries and helping to expand their facilities. In 2024, Turnspire Capital Partners acquired Swanson Industries.
