= Vincent Mai =

American businessman

- Born: Eastern Cape, South Africa
- Occupation: businessman
- Known for: Founder and CEO of The Cranmere Group

Vincent Mai (/ˈmeɪ/ mAY) is an American businessman and philanthropist. He was born, and grew up, in South Africa. He is the founder, chairman and CEO of The Cranmere Group, an investment holding company. The Cranmere Group focuses on investing in businesses to develop and hold for the long term. Formerly he was the CEO and chairman of AEA Investors, one of the oldest private equity firms in the United States.

== Early life ==
Mai was born to French parents in the Cradock farming area of the Eastern Cape, South Africa. He attended Grey High School in Port Elizabeth. He studied accounting at the University of Cape Town, where he played first team rugby.

He is a qualified Chartered Accountant.

== Career ==
Mai moved to London from South Africa in 1965 to join S.G. Warburg & Company, the former Merchant Bank founded by Sir Siegmund Warburg, where he became an executive director. Mai stated that Warburg had a considerable influence on him.

Mai left London for New York in 1976 to become a partner at Lehman Brothers. Having worked with a number of European and U.S. businesses on their strategic and capital-raising needs, Mai became head of Lehman Brother’s international investment banking business and co-head of all its investment banking activities.

In 1989, after 14 years with Lehman Brothers, Mai became CEO of AEA Investors, a firm founded in 1968 to make investments on behalf of S.G. Warburg & Co., as well as the Rockefeller, Mellon, and Harriman families, and over 50 leading businesspeople who led or had led some of the largest public companies in the US as CEOs.

Mai later became chairman of AEA in 1998. Mai took a hands-on approach to his tenure and had a leading role in their investment decisions. He was tasked with strengthening operations in AEA's portfolio companies, and actively working with management teams to bolster growth. In 2011, during Mai's 20-year tenure as Chairman/CEO, AEA was named among the ‘Top 10 Consistent Performing Buyout Fund Managers’ out of over 5,000 firms worldwide, by research firm Preqin. During his tenure, Mai served on the boards of several AEA portfolio companies and chaired the AEA Mezzanine Fund and the AEA Small Business Fund.

Mai has served as chairman of the board of directors of Burt's Bees, and has been a director of the Council on Foreign Relations, of which he remains a member.

During his career, Mai is cited critiquing the traditional view of private equity strategy. His perspective has suggested that businesses and investors would be better served in a permanent capital structure, allowing management teams and shareholders to adopt a long-term operational strategy. This way, the financial interests of the Cranemere management team would be transparent and completely aligned with the management teams of the Operating Companies and Cranemere’s shareholders. He founded Cranemere as the vehicle and structure for this purpose.

=== Cranemere Group ===
The Cranemere Group is a privately owned investment holding company, founded by Mai in 2014. From Cranemere’s inception, Mai was founder, Chairman and CEO. In 2017, Jeff Zients joined Cranemere as CEO, however, in 2020, he was appointed by President Biden to serve as Counselor to the President and Coordinator of the COVID-19 response as part of the COVID-19 Advisory Board. In December, 2023 Kamil Salame was appointed CEO to replace Zients, although Mai remains Founder and Chairman.

Cranemere includes shareholders such as Sovereign Wealth Funds, family offices, and institutions. A majority of Cranemere’s management team and directors are also shareholders. Shareholders have governance rights to maintain alignment between management and investors. The company has partnered with nine platform companies: NorthStar Anesthesia, Outpatient Imaging Affiliates, ES Group - Extraordinary Surfaces, Velocity Vehicle Group, Crossroads Equipment Lease and Finance, System Pavers, Exemplis Corp., Extant Healthcare, and Arietis Health.

The Cranemere team, under Mai’s leadership, works in partnership with the management teams of these companies to invest behind a long-term strategy to accelerate growth. Cranemere was founded on the principle of inclusive stakeholder capitalism and long-term investment, with the integration of sustainability and social impact into Cranemere’s business activities.

== Philanthropy and honours ==
Mai was chairman of the board of Sesame Workshop, producers of Sesame Street, the children’s educational television programme, for 13 years. He stepped down from the board of Sesame Workshop in 2019, and has served as chairman of the Sesame Global Advisory Board since then. He serves on the boards of the International Center for Transitional Justice and the Juilliard School, and is a former trustee of the Carnegie Corporation of New York.

Mai is on the Global Partners Council of the Institute for New Economic Thinking, and formerly chaired the board of the Aaron Diamond AIDS Research Center.

In 2009, Mai was honoured at the National Leadership Awards, a dinner co-sponsored by the Merage Foundation for the American Dream and the Woodrow Wilson International Center for Scholars. The awards recognise the outstanding achievements of US immigrants.

In December 2012, Mai was honoured at the Robert F. Kennedy Center for Justice and Human Rights' Ripple of Hope Awards Dinner.

=== Grey High School Bursary Scheme ===
Mai launched a school bursary scheme at his old high school for worthy recipients from less- privileged backgrounds to receive a high quality education. Springboks Rugby World Cup-winning captain Siya Kolisi was the 75th beneficiary of the bursary scheme, which allowed him to attend Grey High School in Port Elizabeth. Kolisi said, “Without the opportunity, there is no way I’d be where I am today”, in reference to being the recipient of the bursary.

=== Plains of Camdeboo Private Nature Reserve ===
Mai and his family purchased farmland in the Camdeboo plains, in the Karoo region of South Africa, as an environmental restoration project. The project was founded in 2009, and is managed by the Wilderness Foundation Africa, which carries out the restoration work. This includes removing non-native invasive plants, reseeding the land with native and non-invasive plants, prevention of soil erosion, and re-introducing indigenous game.

== Family ==
Vincent and his wife, Anne, have three children; James, Rebecca and Timothy; and six grandchildren.

Vincent's son, James Mai is a founder of Cornwall Capital.
