= Cornwall Capital =

Private investment corporation in New York City

- Type: Private company
- Industry: Investment
- Founded: 2003; 23 years ago
- Founder: Jamie Mai
- Headquarters: New York, New York, United States
- Area served: Global
- Key people: Ben Hockett, Partner; JC de Swaan, Partner
- Website: cornwallcapital.com

Cornwall Capital is a New York City-based private financial investment corporation. It is best known as one of the few investors to foresee and profit from the subprime mortgage crisis of 2007, as described in the book The Big Short by Michael Lewis.

Cornwall seeks highly asymmetric investments, in which the potential profit greatly exceeds potential loss. Its strategies including benefiting from market inefficiencies to thematic fundamental trades. From 2003 to 2012, the firm produced an average annual compounded net return of 40 percent (52 percent gross).

== History ==
The firm was founded in 2003 by Jamie Mai as a family office to diversify the capital of his father, Vincent Mai, who ran the private equity firm AEA Investors, one of the oldest leveraged buyout firms in the United States.

Jamie Mai became president and chief investment officer. Charlie Ledley, a former private equity colleague, joined the firm shortly thereafter. In 2005, Ben Hockett joined as head trader, bringing extensive knowledge of capital markets, derivatives, and fixed income trading.

Cornwall Capital was one of a few investors who saw and shorted the subprime mortgage crisis market before its 2007 collapse. Author Michael Lewis wrote in his 2010 book The Big Short that they were one out of perhaps 20 investors in the world who did so. This particular trade generated 80 times the initial investment. Ledley, Mai, and Hockett were featured in the film adaptation of The Big Short, fictionalized with the names Charlie Geller, Jamie Shipley, and Ben Rickert, and played by John Magaro, Finn Wittrock and Brad Pitt.

Ledley left Cornwall in 2009 to join a large Boston-based hedge fund.

Hockett has remained at the firm as the head trader and chief risk officer. Other senior members include partners JC de Swaan and Ian Haft.

In May 2011, Mai began opening the fund to a few like-minded investors with whom he could share ideas.

In 2012, Mai's investment strategy was described in Jack D. Schwager's book Hedge Fund Market Wizards, which purported to examine the world's greatest hedge fund experts and their strategies.

In 2013, Cornwall Capital was reported to have become the largest shareholder of chemicals manufacturer American Pacific Corporation, a NASDAQ-listed U.S. company, with close to 15% of the outstanding stock. American Pacific Corporation agreed to nominate Haft for election to its board of directors in order to resolve a potential proxy contest. American Pacific Corporation was sold to H.I.G. Capital in January 2014.

In 2022, Cornwall Capital acquired Uniden.
