= Lee McCabe =

Lee McCabe (born 1974) is a British business executive who is the founder of Claymore Partners.

Previously, he served as the head of travel at Facebook from 2012 to 2016.

== Early life and education ==
McCabe was born in December 1974 in Stockton-on-Tees, United Kingdom. He received an M.A. in media production from Sheffield Hallam University and an MBA from Warwick Business School at the University of Warwick.

== Career ==
McCabe began his career in the late 1990s at Warner Music Group in London. In the early 2000s, he joined eBay in the United Kingdom. Between 2006 and 2007, he served as managing director for ChannelAdvisor in Australia and New Zealand before holding a marketing management role at Telstra.

In 2007, McCabe joined Expedia Group. By 2011, he was appointed Vice President of the Partner Services Group, overseeing market management in the Asia-Pacific and North America regions.

In late 2012, Facebook (now Meta Platforms) appointed McCabe as its first Global Head of Travel. In that role, he worked on travel-related commercial strategy and partnerships. In 2014, he was credited as a co-author of the industry report Travel Goes Mobile.

In 2016, McCabe left Facebook to join Alibaba Group as vice president and General Manager for North America. He managed partnerships between the e-commerce company and United States retailers until 2019.

In October 2019, McCabe joined AEA Investors as an operating partner. He also served on the board of directors for Window Nation. In January 2025, McCabe founded Claymore Partners, a platform for private equity portfolio companies.

He is also the author of the book The Trick is Not Minding That it Hurts, currently awaiting publication.
