= Shafroth =

Shafroth may refer to:

- John F. Shafroth (1854–1922), American lawyer and politician who served as a U.S. congressman, U.S. senator, and governor of Colorado
- John F. Shafroth Jr. (1887–1967), United States Navy admiral
- Will Shafroth (b. 1957), American conservationist and outdoor recreation enthusiast

== See also ==
- Jones–Shafroth Act
