= National Park Service 100th Anniversary Commemorative Coin Act =

Unincorporated act to celebrate US coins

- Long title: To provide for the issuance of coins to commemorate the 100th anniversary of the establishment of the National Park Service, and for other purposes.
- Announced in: the 113th United States Congress
- Sponsored by: Rep. Erik Paulsen (R, MN-3)
- Number of co-sponsors: 3

Codification
- Acts affected: National Park Service Organic Act of 1916
- U.S.C. sections affected: 31 U.S.C. § 5134, 31 U.S.C. § 5112, 31 U.S.C. § 5103, 31 U.S.C. § 5136
- Agencies affected: United States Commission of Fine Arts, Citizens Coinage Advisory Committee, National Park Service, United States Congress, United States Department of the Navy, United States Department of the Treasury, United States Department of the Interior

Legislative history
- Introduced in the House as H.R. 627 by Rep. Erik Paulsen (R, MN-3) on February 13, 2013; Committee consideration by United States House Committee on Financial Services; Passed the House on April 29, 2014 (Roll Call Vote 183: 403-13)

The National Park Service 100th Anniversary Commemorative Coin Act (H.R. 627) was a bill that would have directed the Secretary of the Treasury to mint and issue gold, silver, and half-dollar clad coins in commemoration of the 100th anniversary of the establishment of the National Park Service (NPS) in 2016. The coins would have had a surcharge attached, the money from which was given to the National Park Foundation.

The bill passed in the United States House of Representatives during the 113th United States Congress, but no further action was taken. A version of the bill was incorporated into the Carl Levin and Howard P. "Buck" McKeon National Defense Authorization Act for Fiscal Year 2015, signed on December 14, 2014 as Pub. L. 113–291 (text) (PDF).

== Background ==
National Park Service logo

The National Park Service (NPS) is an agency of the United States federal government that manages all U.S. national parks, many American national monuments, and other conservation and historical properties with various title designations. It was created on August 25, 1916, by Congress through the National Park Service Organic Act. It was created "to conserve the scenery and the natural and historic objects and wildlife therein, and to provide for the enjoyment of the same in such manner and by such means as will leave them unimpaired for the enjoyment of future generations."

In 2014, there were more than 20,000 employees of the NPS who oversaw 405 units, of which 59 were designated national parks. National parks must be established by an act of the United States Congress. The first national park, Yellowstone, was signed into law by President Ulysses S. Grant in 1872, followed by Mackinac National Park in 1875 (decommissioned in 1895), and then Sequoia and Yosemite in 1890. Criteria for the selection of National Parks include natural beauty, unique geological features, unusual ecosystems, and recreational opportunities (though these criteria are not always considered together). National Monuments, on the other hand, are frequently chosen for their historical or archaeological significance.

== Provisions of the bill ==
This summary is based largely on the summary provided by the Congressional Research Service, a public domain source.

The National Park Service 100th Anniversary Commemorative Coin Act would have directed the Secretary of the Treasury to mint and issue gold, silver, and half-dollar clad coins in commemoration of the 100th anniversary of the establishment of the National Park Service (NPS).

The bill would have authorized the issuance of coins under this Act only for a one-year period, beginning on January 1, 2016.

The bill would have required all sales of coins minted under this Act to include a surcharge of $35 per gold coin, $10 per silver coin, and $5 per half-dollar clad coin.

The bill would also have required all of the surcharges received from the sale of such coins to be paid to the National Park Foundation for projects and programs to help preserve and protect resources under the stewardship of the NPS and to promote public enjoyment and appreciation of those resources.

The bill would have prohibited the surcharges paid to the Foundation from being used for land acquisition.

== Procedural history ==
The National Park Service 100th Anniversary Commemorative Coin Act was introduced into the United States House of Representatives on February 13, 2013 by Rep. Erik Paulsen (R, MN-3). The bill was referred to the United States House Committee on Financial Services. On April 29, 2014, the House voted in Roll Call Vote 183 in a vote of 403-13. Similar legislation (S. 1158) was introduced into the United States Senate.

Both H.R. 627 and S. 1158 failed to be passed into law by 2016, but Public Law 113–291 contained legislation similar to both acts, allowing the coins to be produced anyway.

== Debate and discussion ==
Rep. Paulsen, who introduced the bill, argued that "even during tough economic times, it's important to find new, cost-effective ways to preserve these treasures for future generations to learn from and enjoy." Paulsen called the National Parks "some of our most treasured natural resources."

President and CEO of the National Park Foundation Neil Mulholland said that "the commemorative coins would be a special ways for individuals to mark this significant milestone while simultaneously providing incredible support to these cherished places."

== See also ==
- List of bills in the 113th United States Congress
- List of national parks of the United States
