= Uniden =

Japanese company in the wireless communication industry

Uniden Holdings Corporation
- Native name: ユニデンホールディングス株式会社
- Romanized name: Yuniden Hôrudingusu
- Type: Private
- Industry: Wireless communications
- Founded: February 7, 1966; 60 years ago
- Founder: Hidero Fujimoto
- Successor: Kengo Nate (President and CEO) (as of 1 January 2023)
- Headquarters: Chūō-ku, Tokyo, Japan
- Area served: Australia; Canada; China; Japan; New Zealand; South Korea; United States; Vietnam
- Products: Electronic radio communication devices
- Revenue: US$135,537,000 (2017–2018)
- Number of employees: 763 (2025)
- Parent: Cornwall Capital
- Subsidiaries: Attowave Co., Ltd. (since 2021)
- Website: uniden.com (North America); uniden.com.au (Australia); unidenholdings.jp/en (Japan) (in English); unidenholdings.jp (Japan)

Uniden Holdings Corporation (ユニデンホールディングス株式会社, Yuniden Hôrudingusu) is a Japanese company in the wireless communication industry.

== History ==
Uniden was established in 1966 by its founder Hidero Fujimoto as "Uni Electronics Corp". Uniden became a well-known brand in the 1970s by manufacturing and marketing millions of citizens band radios (CB), under the Uniden brand as well as for other companies such as Midland and Realistic, which rebranded the equipment under their own labels. Uniden also marketed CB radios in the United Kingdom under the Uniden and Uniace brands during the early 1980s.

During the 1980s, Uniden grew to become the world's largest manufacturer of cordless telephones in addition to television satellite equipment, mobile radios, advanced marine electronics and radio scanners (the latter under the BearCat brand). In Europe, it became successful in the telecommunications market with its introduction of 900 MHz cordless telephones.

As Uniden continued to grow and extend its international operations, Uniden Australia and Uniden New Zealand were established in 1989.

Uniden's revenue has plummeted since smartphones and VoIP solutions became mainstream. In 2007, Uniden had revenue of ¥77.7 billion. Three years later in 2010, Uniden reported revenue of ¥35.5 billion.

In 2017, Uniden began the R-Series, Uniden's first digital radar detectors, with the introduction of the R1 and R3. Uniden then continued with the introduction of the R7, R8, and R4.

In 2023, Uniden launched the R9, their first custom-install radar detector and laser jammer system.

In late 2024, Uniden released an updated version of many of their R-Series models with the introduction of the R4w, R8w, and R9w, bringing Wi-Fi support to their detectors. Wi-Fi enables over-the-air firmware updates and updates to the on-device GPS database via the official R/Tach app.

=== Acquisition of Attowave (2021) ===
On 24 September 2021, Uniden acquired Attowave Co., Ltd., a Seoul-based South Korean developer and manufacturer of radar-detector technology established in 1998, for approximately ¥2.12 billion (₩22.9 billion). Attowave’s patented horn-antenna and RF-circuit designs are now integrated into Uniden’s R-series radar detectors (e.g., R4 and R8).. The deal also marked Uniden’s first major hardware-technology acquisition and expanded its R&D footprint into South Korea. Notably, Uniden's radar detectors are now manufactured in South Korea.

== Operation ==
As of 2018, core products included cordless telephones, radar detectors, radio scanners, CB radios, and security/surveillance products. According to the company’s support site, Uniden no longer produces cordless telephones as of 2023. At one point Uniden produced more than two million wireless products every month and purportedly manufactured one cordless phone every 3.2 seconds—a statistic still cited on Uniden Australia's website.

Uniden operates globally, but its main commercial activities are situated in the United States and Japan. Manufacturing sites have been located in China, South Korea, and Vietnam. In 2008, Uniden began moving production from China to Vietnam to take advantage of lower wages.

Uniden was purchased by Cornwall Capital, a private equity firm based in New York, in August 2022.

Uniden was delisted from the Tokyo Stock Exchange on 29 November 2022.

== Gallery ==
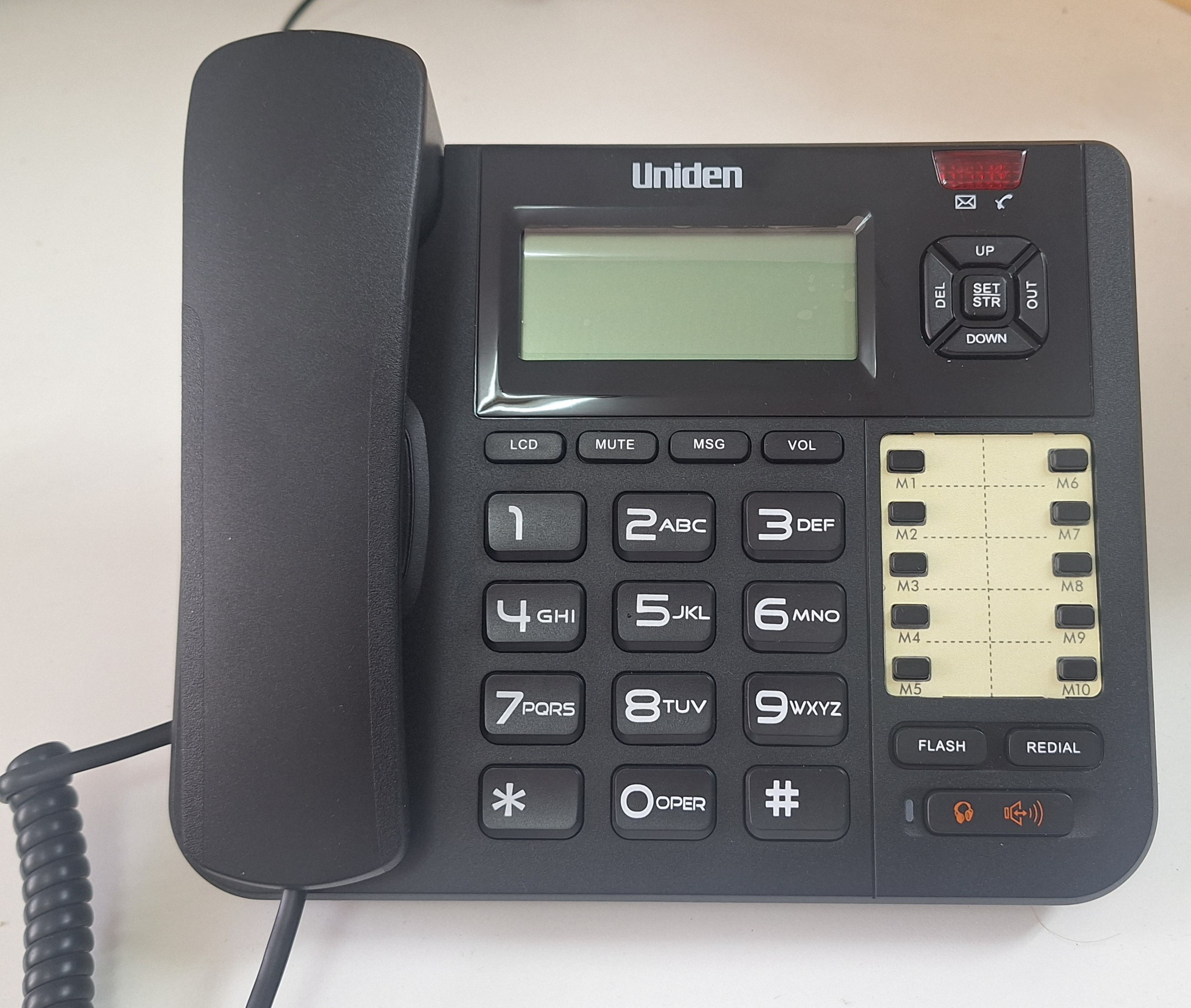
Landline telephone model AS-8401

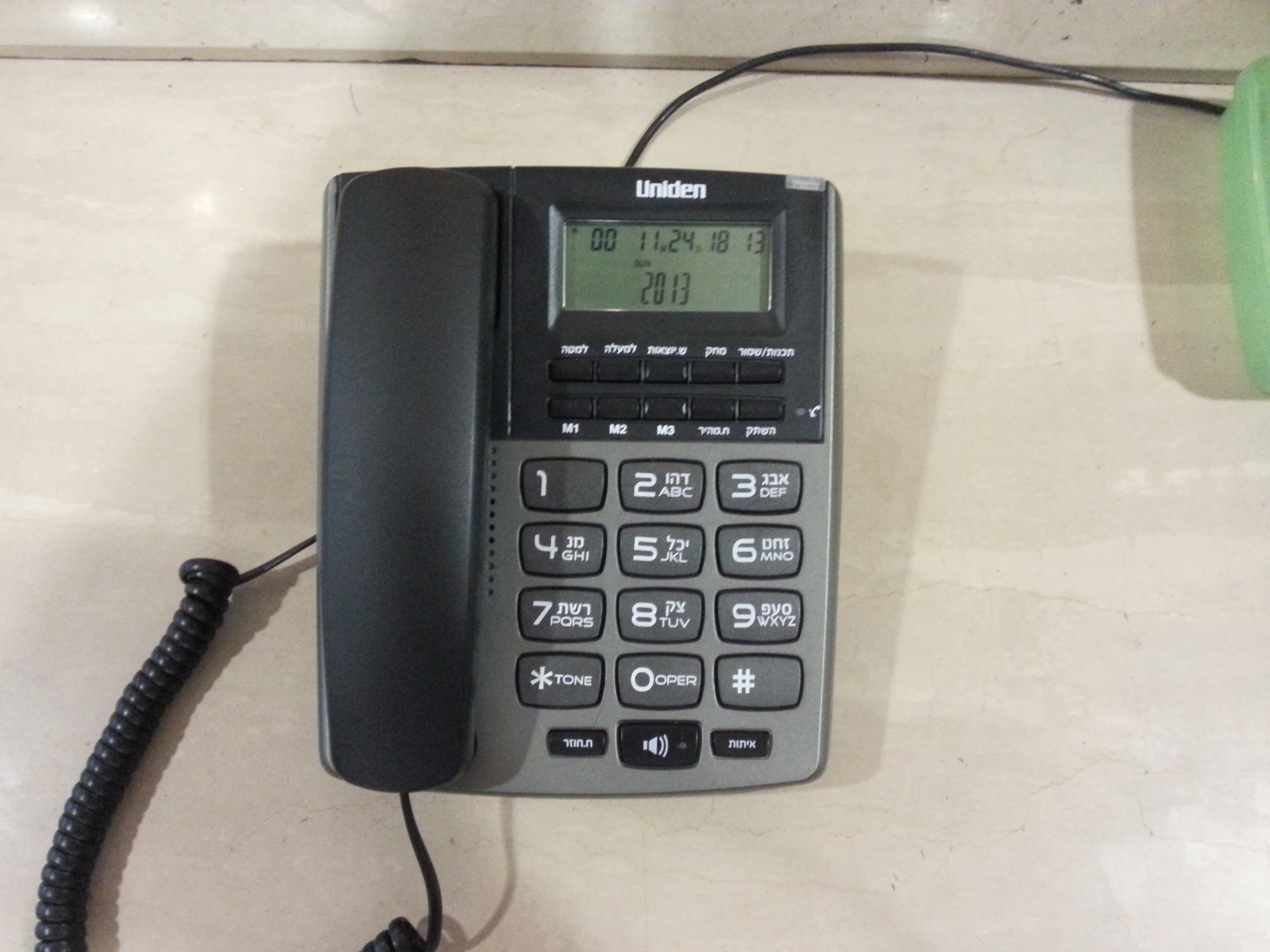
Landline telephone model AS-7402 manufactured in 2013

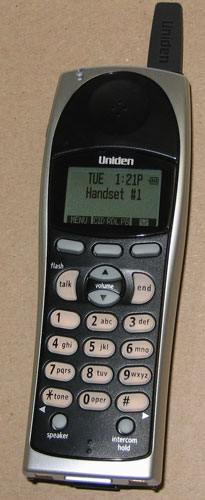
Uniden telephone handset

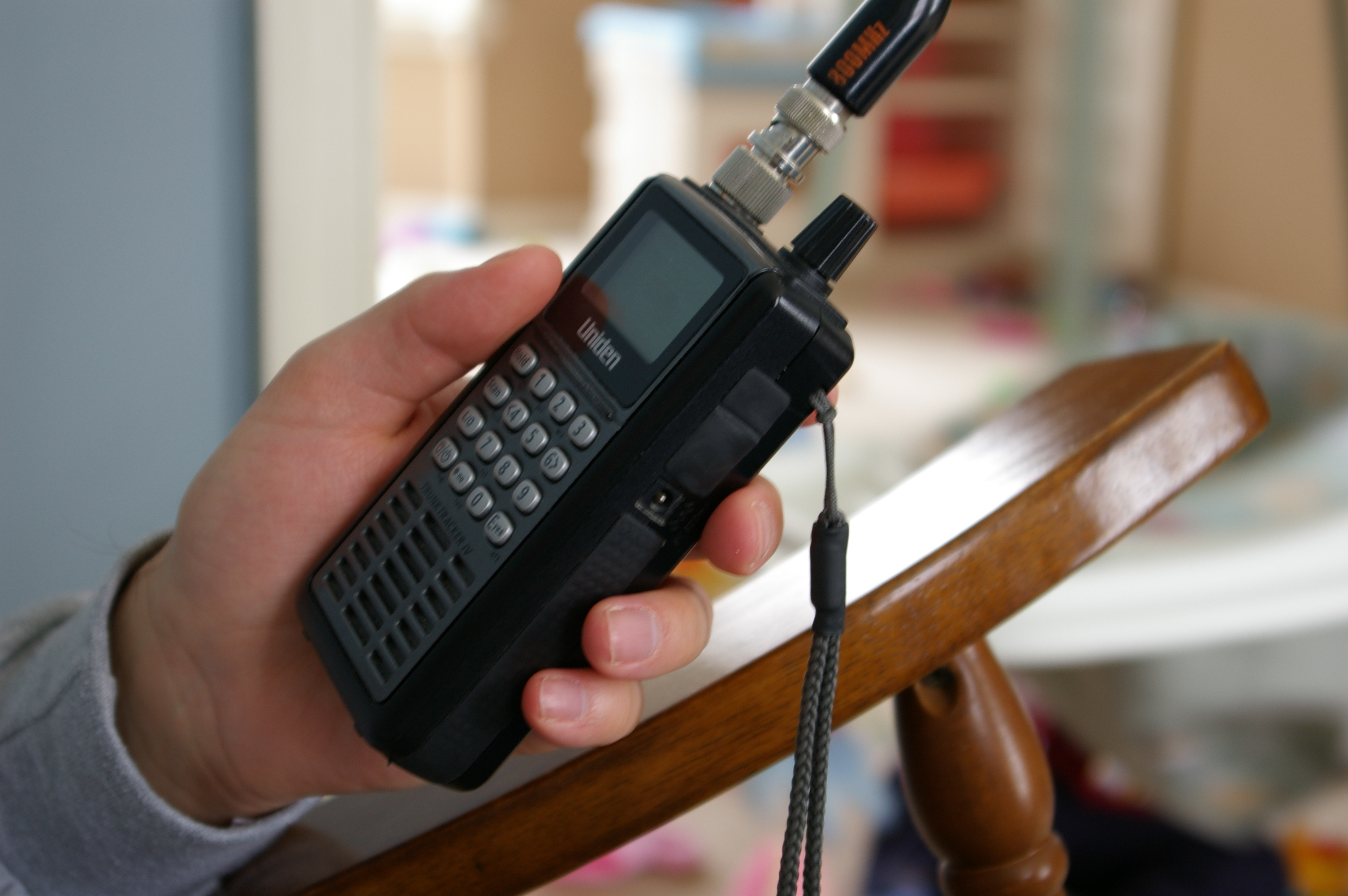
Uniden BCD396T handheld radio scanner

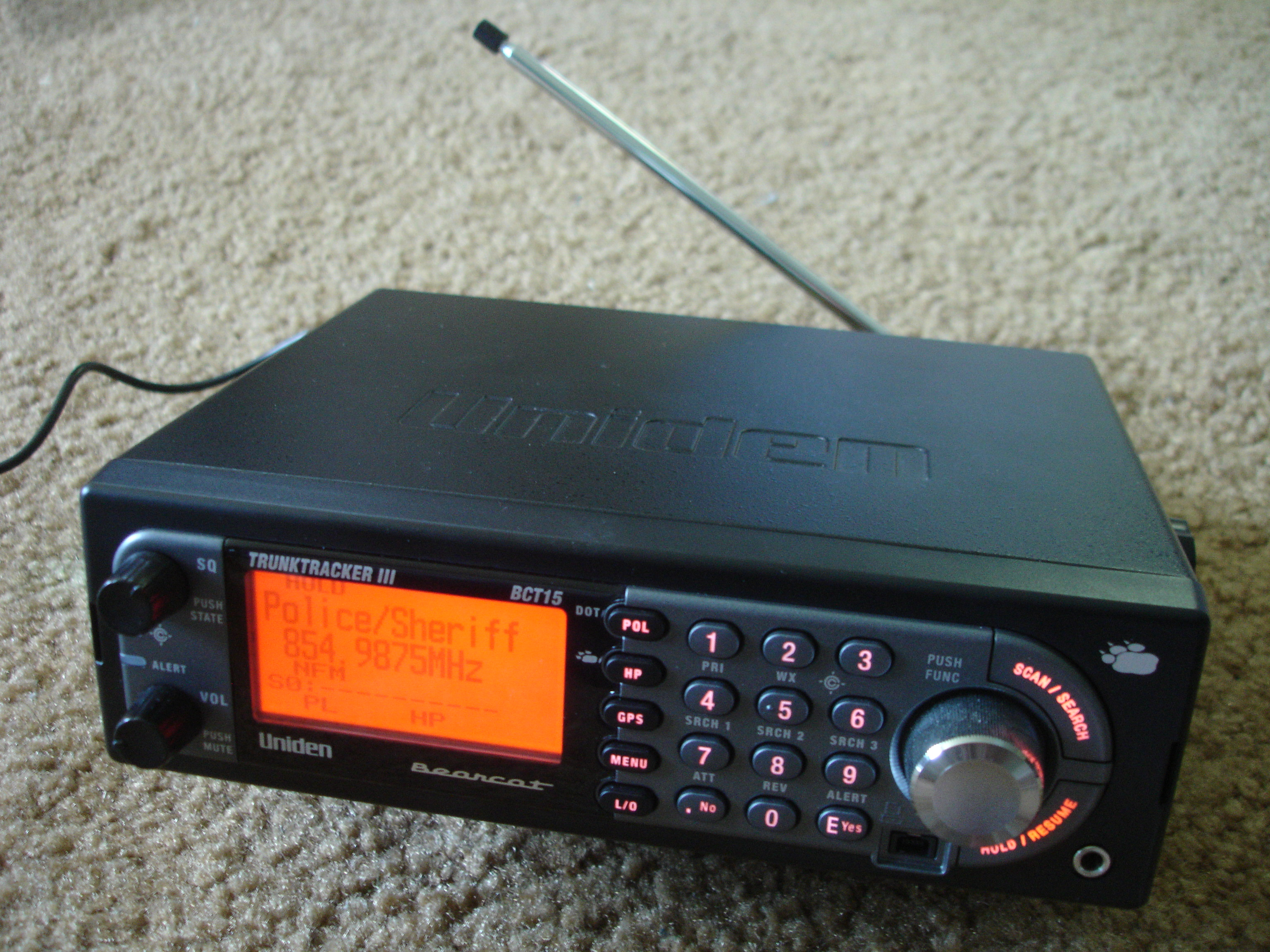
Uniden BCT-15 mobile/base radio scanner

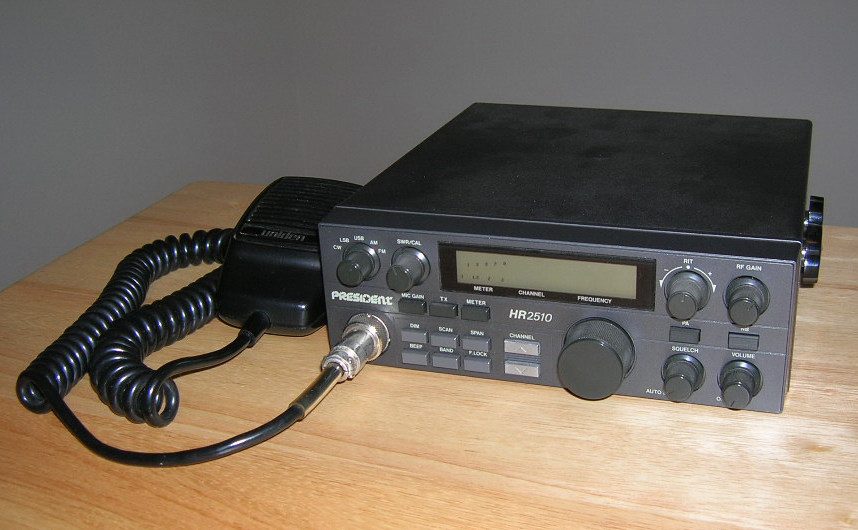
Uniden President HR2510A, a mobile 10-meter band radio

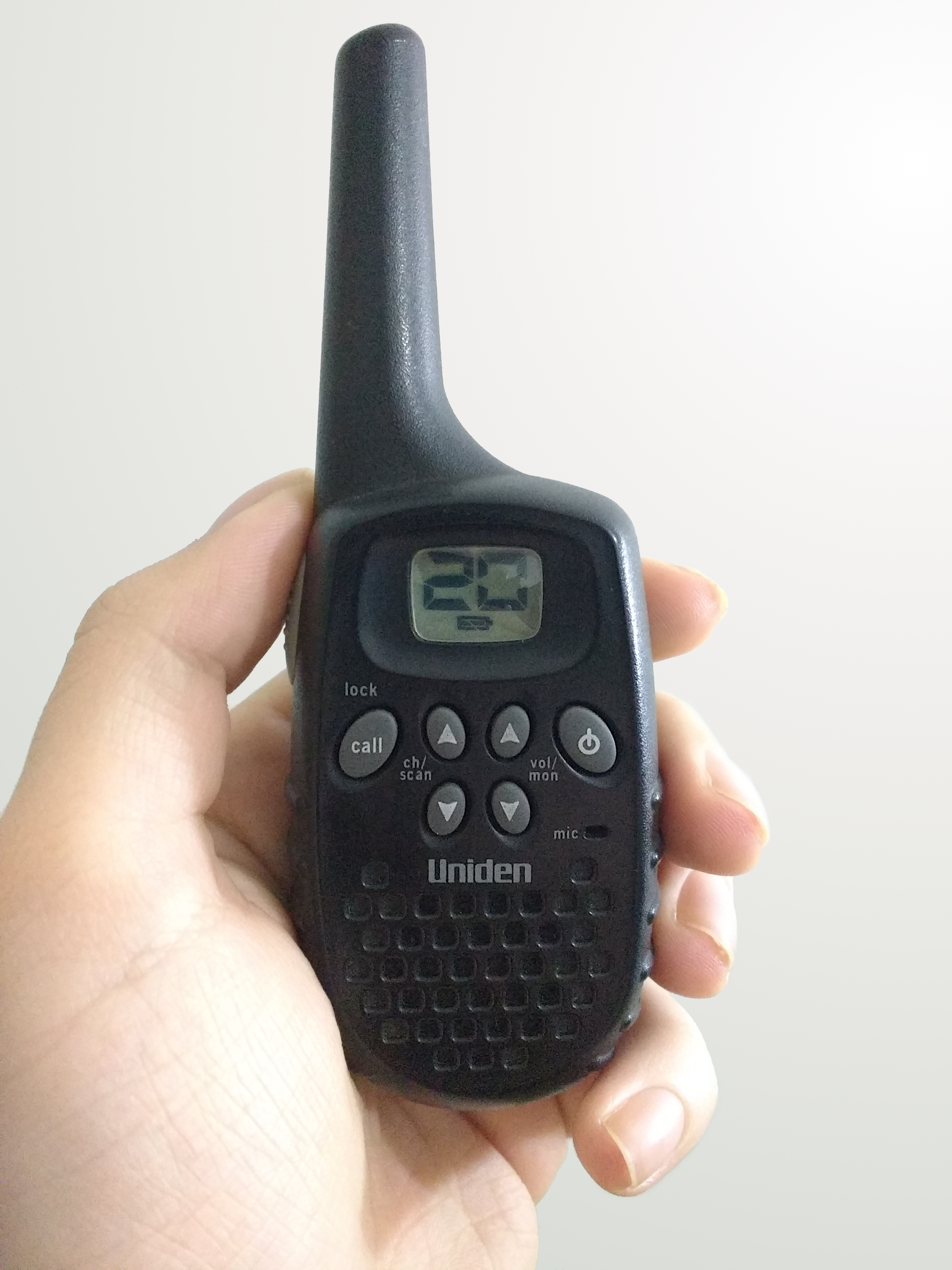
Uniden walkie-talkie model GMR1035-2

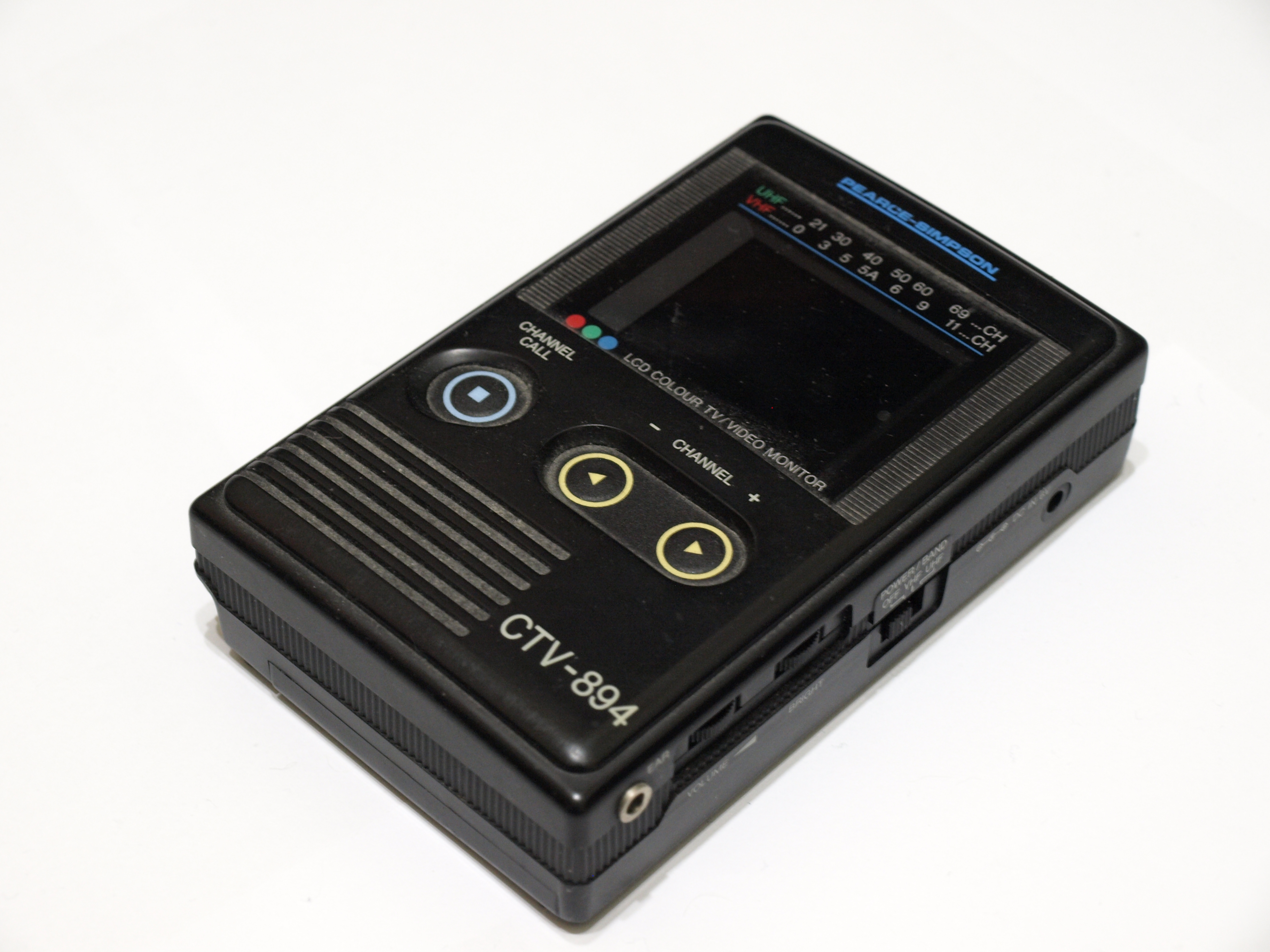
Pearce-Simpson CTV-894 handheld television

== In popular culture ==
- In the 1992 movie Universal Soldier, a Uniden Bearcat BC-560XLT scanner is seen in the cabin of the Mobile Lab Unit truck and is used by Andrew Scott/GR13 (Dolph Lundgren) to track down Luc Deveraux/GR44 (Jean-Claude Van Damme) in the road chase scene.
