= Stop Exploitation Through Trafficking Act of 2013 =

- Long title: To stop exploitation through trafficking.
- Announced in: the 113th United States Congress
- Sponsored by: Rep. Erik Paulsen (R, MN-3)
- Number of co-sponsors: 1

Codification
- Acts affected: Victims of Trafficking and Violence Protection Act of 2000, Sex Offender Registration and Notification Act, Omnibus Crime Control and Safe Streets Act of 1968, Victims Trafficking and Violence Protection Act of 2000, Workforce Investment Act of 1998
- U.S.C. sections affected: 42 U.S.C. § 3755, 22 U.S.C. § 7103, 22 U.S.C. § 7102, 18 U.S.C. § 1591, 18 U.S.C. § 1589, and others.
- Agencies affected: United States Department of Justice, United States Department of Labor, United States Department of State, Bureau of Indian Affairs, Federal Bureau of Investigation, Department of Health and Human Services, Department of Homeland Security

Legislative history
- Introduced in the House as H.R. 3610 by Rep. Erik Paulsen (R, MN-3) on November 21, 2013; Committee consideration by United States House Committee on the Judiciary, United States House Committee on Education and the Workforce, United States House Judiciary Subcommittee on Crime, Terrorism, Homeland Security and Investigations

The Stop Exploitation Through Trafficking Act of 2013 (H.R. 3610) (SETT) is a bill that would require each state, within three years, to have in effect legislation that: (1) treats a minor who has engaged or attempted to engage in a commercial sex act as a victim of a severe form of trafficking in persons, (2) discourages the charging or prosecution of such an individual for a prostitution or sex trafficking offense, and (3) encourages the diversion of such individual to child protection services.

The bill was introduced into the United States House of Representatives during the 113th United States Congress.

== Background ==
Human trafficking is the modern form of slavery, with illegal smuggling and trading of people, for forced labour or sexual exploitation. Trafficking is officially defined as the recruitment, transportation, transfer, harboring, or receipt of persons by means of coercion, abduction, fraud, deception, or abuse of power of a position of vulnerability for the purpose of exploitation. Human trafficking is not synonymous with forced migration or smuggling. In the U.S., human trafficking tends to occur around international travel-hubs with large immigrant populations, notably California and Texas. The U.S. Justice Department estimates that 17,500 people are trafficked into the country every year, but the true figure could be higher, because of the large numbers of undocumented immigrants. The United States Department of State has also estimated that between 14,000-17,5000 people annually are trafficked for sex, labor, or other types of exploitation into the United States. Those being trafficked include young children, teenagers, men and women and can be domestic citizens or foreign nationals.

The Stop Exploitation Through Trafficking Act of 2013 was based on a Minnesota state law called the Safe Harbor for Sexually Exploited Youth Act. The law "changed Minnesota's approach to meeting the needs of trafficked children by recognizing that prostituted children are victims of trafficking, not criminal perpetrators."

== Provisions of the bill ==
This summary is based largely on the summary provided by the Congressional Research Service, a public domain source.

The Stop Exploitation Through Trafficking Act of 2013 would require each state, within three years, to have in effect legislation that: (1) treats a minor who has engaged or attempted to engage in a commercial sex act as a victim of a severe form of trafficking in persons, (2) discourages the charging or prosecution of such an individual for a prostitution or sex trafficking offense, and (3) encourages the diversion of such individual to child protection services. Authorizes the Attorney General to withhold specified Edward Byrne Memorial Justice Assistance Grant Program funds from a state that fails to comply with such requirement.

The bill would increase the amount a victim of peonage, slavery, or trafficking in persons may recover in a civil action against the perpetrator to treble damages. Directs the Attorney General to establish a process to collect and analyze data relating to the issuance and enforcement of mandatory restitution orders with respect to such offenses.

The bill would amend the Victims of Trafficking and Violence Protection Act of 2000 (VTVPA) to require the United States Secretary of Health and Human Services (HHS) to make grants annually for a national communication system to assist victims of severe forms of trafficking in persons in communicating with service providers.

The bill would amend the Workforce Investment Act of 1998 to include victims of a severe form of trafficking in persons among those eligible for the Job Corps.

The bill would direct the Attorney General to implement and maintain a National Strategy for Combating Human Trafficking that includes: (1) integrated federal, state, local, and tribal efforts to investigate and prosecute human trafficking cases; (2) case coordination within the Department of Justice (DOJ); and (3) interagency coordination regarding the prevention, investigation, and apprehension of individuals targeting and exploiting adults and children for human trafficking.

The bill would amend the VTVPA to require the Attorney General's annual report on agency activities under such Act to including information on: (1) data relating to the issuance and enforcement of mandatory restitution orders with respect to peonage, slavery, and trafficking in persons; and (2) the number of sex and labor trafficking investigations that were opened by the Federal Bureau of Investigation (FBI), the United States Department of Homeland Security (DHS), the United States Department of Labor, or the Human Smuggling and Trafficking Center or that were reported to the United States attorneys, the Human Trafficking Prosecution Unit in DOJ's Civil Rights Division, and the Child Exploitation and Obscenity Section in DOJ's Criminal Division.

The bill would amend the Sex Offender Registration and Notification Act to modify the definition of "tier III sex offender" to include a sex offender whose offense is: (1) punishable by imprisonment for more than one year, and (2) comparable to or more severe than sex trafficking committed against a minor or an attempt or conspiracy to commit such offense against a minor.

== Congressional Budget Office report ==
This summary is based largely on the summary provided by the Congressional Budget Office, as ordered reported by the House Committee on the Judiciary on April 30, 2014. This is a public domain source.

H.R. 3610 would make several changes to laws related to human trafficking:

- Section 2 would allow the United States Attorney General to apply preferential treatment when making some public safety grants to states that have adopted certain laws related to trafficking victims, but would not change the funding level for those grants.
- Section 3 would require the Interagency Task Force to Monitor and Combat Trafficking to expand its reporting on certain trafficking-related crimes. The Congressional Budget Office (CBO) expects the provision would have little effect on the workload of the task force.
- Section 4 would require the United States Department of Health and Human Services (HHS) to provide funding for a national hotline for trafficking victims. Under current law, HHS already provides a multiyear grant that partially funds the National Human Trafficking Resource Center.
- Section 5 would make trafficking victims eligible to participate in the Job Corps if they meet the age and income requirements, but would not change total funding for the Job Corps program.

The CBO estimates that enacting the legislation would have no significant effect on discretionary spending and would not affect direct spending or revenues; therefore, pay-as-you-go procedures do not apply.

H.R. 3610 contains no intergovernmental or private-sector mandates as defined in the Unfunded Mandates Reform Act and would impose no costs on state, local, or tribal governments.

== Procedural history ==
The Stop Exploitation Through Trafficking Act of 2013 was introduced into the United States House of Representatives on November 21, 2013 by Rep. Erik Paulsen (R, MN-3). It was referred to the United States House Committee on the Judiciary, the United States House Committee on Education and the Workforce, and the United States House Judiciary Subcommittee on Crime, Terrorism, Homeland Security and Investigations. On May 13, 2014, the bill was reported (amended) by the Committee on the Judiciary alongside House Report 113-447 part 1. It was scheduled to be voted on in the House on May 20, 2014 under a suspension of the rules.

== Debate and discussion ==
According to the group Advocates for Human Rights, the legislation was needed because "trafficked children under age 18 continue to be adjudicated as 'delinquents' for engaging in prostitution, too often subjecting them to detention rather than providing services to help them recover from trafficking."

Shared Hope International also supported the legislation, offering a form letter on their website that citizens could send to their members of Congress. The letter argues that the bill would help victims gain compensation and enable them to participate in the Job Corps training program, as well as improving laws to ensure that children are treated as victims and not criminals.

The Seattle Times editorial board wrote an editorial in favor of the bill, calling on Congress to "strengthen U.S. laws to stop human trafficking."

== See also ==
- List of bills in the 113th United States Congress
- Human trafficking in the United States
