= Parkman, Maine =

Town in Maine, United States

- Town
- Location in Piscataquis County and the state of Maine
- Coordinates: 45°7′33″N 69°26′10″W
- Country: United States
- State: Maine
- County: Piscataquis
- Incorporated: January 29, 1822

Area
  - Total: 46.05 sq mi (119.27 km^{2})
  - Land: 45.23 sq mi (117.15 km^{2})
  - Water: 0.82 sq mi (2.12 km^{2})
- Elevation: 735 ft (224 m)

Population (2020)
  - Total: 747
  - Density: 17/sq mi (6.4/km^{2})
- Time zone: UTC-5 (Eastern (EST))
  - Summer (DST): UTC-4 (EDT)
- ZIP code: 04443
- Area code: 207
- FIPS code: 23-56765
- GNIS feature ID: 0579055
- Website: www.parkmanmaine.com

Parkman is a town in Piscataquis County, Maine, United States. The population was 747 at the 2020 census.

== History ==
First known as Plantation Number Five, Sixth Range, it was purchased by Samuel Parkman, a Boston Brahmin. In 1822, it was incorporated as a town and named for its proprietor. It was inherited by the proprietor's son, George Parkman, who visited it annually. Much of the town has excellent soil for farming. In 1837, the wheat crop was 6,018 bushels. In 1859, it was noted for making butter and cheese. By 1886, Parkman had several sawmills and a gristmill.

== Geography ==
According to the United States Census Bureau, the town has a total area of 46.05 square miles (119.27 km^{2}), of which 45.23 square miles (117.15 km^{2}) is land and 0.82 square miles (2.12 km^{2}) is water. Parkman is drained by a branch of the Piscataquis River. The principal bodies of water are Bennett and Harlow ponds.

== Demographics ==
Historical population
Census	Pop.	Note	%±
1820	255		—
1830	802		214.5%
1840	1,205		50.2%
1850	1,243		3.2%
1860	1,166		−6.2%
1870	1,105		−5.2%
1880	1,005		−9.0%
1890	813		−19.1%
1900	718		−11.7%
1910	646		−10.0%
1920	565		−12.5%
1930	538		−4.8%
1940	581		8.0%
1950	590		1.5%
1960	530		−10.2%
1970	457		−13.8%
1980	621		35.9%
1990	790		27.2%
2000	811		2.7%
2010	843		3.9%
2020	747		−11.4%
U.S. Decennial Census

=== 2010 census ===
As of the census of 2010, there were 843 people, 353 households, and 241 families residing in the town. The population density was 18.6 inhabitants per square mile (7.2/km^{2}). There were 538 housing units at an average density of 11.9 per square mile (4.6/km^{2}). The racial makeup of the town was 97.7% White, 0.1% African American, 0.5% Native American, 0.1% Asian, 0.5% from other races, and 1.1% from two or more races. Hispanic or Latino people of any race were 2.6% of the population.

There were 353 households, of which 28.0% had children under the age of 18 living with them, 58.1% were married couples living together, 5.9% had a female householder with no husband present, 4.2% had a male householder with no wife present, and 31.7% were non-families. 24.4% of all households were made up of individuals, and 7.9% had someone living alone who was 65 years of age or older. The average household size was 2.39 and the average family size was 2.83.

The median age in the town was 45.2 years. 21.5% of residents were under the age of 18; 6.7% were between the ages of 18 and 24; 21.6% were from 25 to 44; 35.2% were from 45 to 64; and 14.9% were 65 years of age or older. The gender makeup of the town was 52.2% male and 47.8% female.

=== 2000 census ===
As of the census of 2000, there were 811 people, 311 households, and 222 families residing in the town. The population density was 17.8 people per square mile (6.9/km^{2}). There were 498 housing units at an average density of 10.9 per square mile (4.2/km^{2}). The racial makeup of the town was 98.03% White, 0.86% African American, 0.12% Native American, 0.12% Asian, and 0.86% from two or more races. Hispanic or Latino people of any race were 0.49% of the population.

There were 311 households, out of which 35.7% had children under the age of 18 living with them, 61.4% were married couples living together, 6.4% had a female householder with no husband present, and 28.3% were non-families. 21.5% of all households were made up of individuals, and 9.0% had someone living alone who was 65 years of age or older. The average household size was 2.61 and the average family size was 3.03.

In the town, the population was spread out, with 27.6% under the age of 18, 4.9% from 18 to 24, 30.5% from 25 to 44, 25.9% from 45 to 64, and 11.1% who were 65 years of age or older. The median age was 38 years. For every 100 females, there were 109.0 males. For every 100 females age 18 and over, there were 106.7 males.

The median income for a household in the town was $28,355, and the median income for a family was $32,000. Males had a median income of $26,207 versus $20,313 for females. The per capita income for the town was $11,965. About 8.5% of families and 15.4% of the population were below the poverty line, including 11.8% of those under age 18 and 21.8% of those age 65 or over.

== Notable people ==
- William E. Brewster, banker, merchant, and politician
- Chet Chadbourne, baseball player
- Charles Alton Ellis, professor, mathematician, and structural engineer of the Golden Gate Bridge
- Victor A. McKusick, geneticist, original author of Mendelian Inheritance in Man database
- Vincent L. McKusick, chief justice of the Maine Supreme Judicial Court
- Burt Shavitz, beekeeper and photographer, co-founder of Burt's Bees
- George R. Shaw, Boston architect
