= Katahdin Woods and Waters National Monument =

Protected area in Maine, US

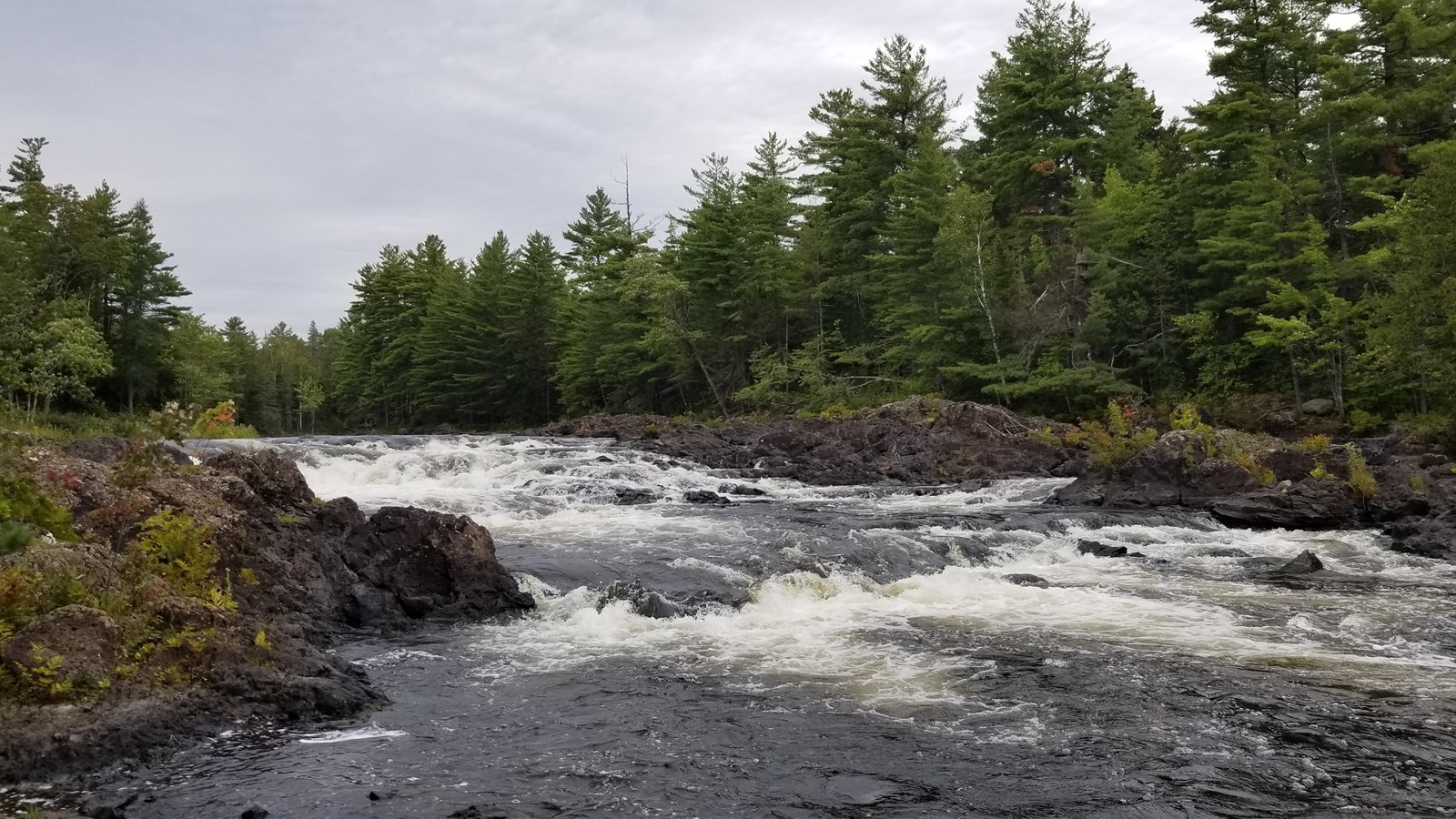
- Pond Pitch along the East Branch of the Penobscot River

- Location within Maine Location within the United States
- Interactive map of Katahdin Woods and Waters National Monument
- Location: North Central Maine, United States
- Nearest city: Bangor
- Coordinates: 45.970362°N 68.619336°W
- Area: 87,563 acres (35,435 ha)
- Established: Monument: August 24, 2016
- Visitors: 33,835 (in 2025)
- Governing body: National Park Service
- Website: www.nps.gov/kaww/

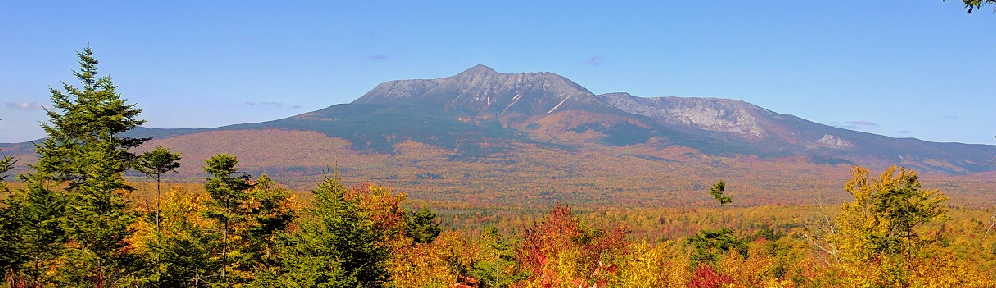
Mount Katahdin, photographed from the park

Katahdin Woods and Waters National Monument is a U.S. national monument spanning 87,563 acres (137 sq mi; 35,435 ha) of mountains and forestland in northern Penobscot County, Maine, including a section of the East Branch Penobscot River. The monument is located on the eastern border of Maine's Baxter State Park. Native animals include moose, bobcats, bald eagles, salmon, and Canada lynx.

== History of the monument ==
Roxanne Quimby, a co-founder of US company Burt's Bees, and her foundation, Elliotsville Plantation, Inc., began purchasing land near Baxter State Park in 2001 before formally announcing their plans in 2011 that the land would one day become part of a national park. Following opposition by state and federal politicians to the creation of a national park, Quimby changed her focus to a national monument, which could be created with a proclamation by the president under the Antiquities Act. On August 23, 2016, Elliotsville Plantation and the Quimby Family Foundation donated the land (valued at $60 million), plus $20 million to fund initial operations and a commitment of $20 million in future support, to the federal government. On August 24, 2016, the eve of the National Park Service centennial, President Barack Obama proclaimed 87,563 acres (137 sq mi; 35,435 ha) of land as the Katahdin Woods and Waters National Monument.

In December 2020, the Park Service received funding to purchase an additional 3,000–4,000 acres (4.7–6.3 sq mi; 1,200–1,600 ha) of land.

A visitor center called the Tekαkαpimək Contact Station was inaugurated in August 2024 with a design inspired by Wabanaki culture and history.

== History of the land ==
For more than 11,000 years, the Penobscot Nation inhabited the area. The first recorded European exploration of the region occurred in 1793 with a survey commissioned by the Commonwealth of Massachusetts, of which Maine was still a part. In 1820, Major Joseph Treat, guided by John Neptune of the Penobscot Tribe, produced the first detailed maps of the region. In the 19th century, the area was extensively logged. In the 1830s, the farms of William Hunt and Hiram Dacey on the eastern side of the Penobscot East Branch provided lodging to loggers, explorers, scientists, and others who wanted to explore the Katahdin region or climb its mountains. The Dacey Farm later became the Lunksoos Camps. At present, it is the site of the Lunksoos Boat Launch. In 1849, Elizabeth Oakes Smith stayed at the Hunt farm when she climbed Katahdin. Henry David Thoreau visited the area multiple times. In 1857, Penobscot guide Joe Polis took Thoreau past Dacey Farm and made a brief stop at Hunt Farm. In 1872, Theodore Roosevelt first visited the area with guide William Wingate Sewall and stayed at the William Sewall House. Roosevelt followed the route across the East Branch and up the Wassataquoik. He returned multiple times. Maine Governor Percival Baxter, who later designated the lands to the immediate west of the national monument to become Baxter State Park, visited the area many times.

== Reactions ==
Many people opposed the monument, with some concerned about federal intrusion into the lands of Northern Maine. One of the most vocal opponents to the creation of the national monument was Paul LePage, who became the state's Governor in January 2011. He called the monument "unilateral action against the will of the people, this time the citizens of rural Maine!" Local polling showed that a majority of local residents and businesses supported the monument's creation as a driver of economic opportunity in a region with decreasing industry.

Before the designation, U.S. Senators from Maine, Angus King and Susan Collins, wrote a letter to President Obama outlining “serious reservations” about the proposal. Their opinions evolved into great support in years since.

It was suggested that President Donald Trump could act to reverse the creation of the monument, a move local opponents wanted him to consider. Trump was critical of the monument's creation during 2016 campaign appearances in Maine. Supporters of the monument called the potential abolition a "destructive step". United States Secretary of the Interior, Ryan Zinke, did not recommend to President Trump in a December 2017 report for the monument to be shrunk or its creation reversed, instead advising that the monument's management and development plans be slightly changed. Trump did not make any changes to the monument.

Many local business owners have since praised the order. A 2021 National Park Service report showed that visitors to Katahdin Woods and Waters National Monument in 2020 spent $2.7 million in communities near the park, with a cumulative local economic benefit of $3.3 million.

In 2022, Senator King introduced a bill cosponsored by Senator Collins to expand the National Monument.

Local concerns faded over as visitation increased and fears of eminent domain were unfounded.

== Geology ==
The bedrock of Katahdin Woods and Waters spans over 150 million years of the Paleozoic era, revealing well-intact exposures of Paleozoic rock strata with visible fossils. In the lands west of the Penobscot River's East Branch, volcanic rock from the Devonian period, mostly Katahdin granite and some Traveler rhyolite, is prevalent. The oldest rock in the monument, a light greenish-gray quartzite and slate from the early Cambrian period, which is 500 million years old, can be observed along the riverbank of East Branch at Grand Pitch (a river rapid). This rock is part of the Weeksboro-Lunksoos Lake anticline, a wide upward fold of rocks, evidence of mountain-building tectonics common to that part of the state.

== See also ==
- List of national monuments of the United States
