= Protecting Volunteer Firefighters and Emergency Responders Act =

United States law

- Long title: To amend the Internal Revenue Code of 1986 to ensure that emergency services volunteers are not taken into account as employees under the shared responsibility requirements contained in the Patient Protection and Affordable Care Act.
- Nicknames: The Senate's Unemployment Insurance bill
- Announced in: the 113th United States Congress
- Sponsored by: Rep. Lou Barletta (R, PA-11)
- Number of co-sponsors: 36

Codification
- Acts affected: Internal Revenue Code of 1986

Legislative history
- Introduced in the House as H.R. 3979 by Rep. Lou Barletta (R, PA-11) on January 31, 2014; Committee consideration by United States House Committee on Ways and Means; Passed the House on March 11, 2014 (Roll Call Vote 116: 410-0)

The Protecting Volunteer Firefighters and Emergency Responders Act (H.R. 33, Pub. L. 114–3 (text) (PDF)) is a bill that amends the Internal Revenue Code to exclude volunteer hours of volunteer firefighters and emergency medical personnel from counting towards the calculation of the number of a firm’s full-time employees for purposes of certain provisions of the Affordable Care Act. This would mean that there is no requirement that volunteer emergency responders be offered health care by the organization they volunteer with.

The bill was proposed in the 113th United States Congress as H.R. 3979, and passed, but the text of the bill was modified, ultimately turning the bill into a defense authorization. In the United States Senate, Majority Leader Harry Reid chose to use the bill as a legislative vehicle to pass an extension of federal long-term unemployment insurance benefits. When the bill reached the senate, Reid added substantial provisions on unemployment, renaming the bill the Emergency Unemployment Compensation Extension Act of 2014. The bill passed the Senate with the new unemployment language. The bill was passed into law as Carl Levin and Howard P. "Buck" McKeon National Defense Authorization Act for Fiscal Year 2015. (Pub. L. 113–291 (text) (PDF))

The language of the original bill was passed in the 114th congress.

== Background ==
The employer mandate is a penalty that will be incurred by employers with more than 50 employees that do not offer health insurance to their full-time workers. This provision was included as a disincentive for employers considering dropping their current insurance plans once the insurance exchanges began operating as an alternative source of insurance. Proponents of the reform law wanted to address the parts of the healthcare system they believed to not be working well, while causing minimal disruption to those happy with the coverage they have.

== Provisions of the bill ==
=== The Protecting Volunteer Firefighters and Emergency Responders Act ===
The Protecting Volunteer Firefighters and Emergency Responders Act would amend the Internal Revenue Code to provide that a bona fide volunteer providing firefighting and prevention services, emergency medical services, or ambulance services to a state or local government or a tax-exempt organization shall not be counted in determining the number of full-time employees of an employer for purposes of the employer mandate to provide health care coverage under the Patient Protection and Affordable Care Act.

=== Unemployment insurance ===
H.R. 3979, as amended by the Senate, would extend the federal unemployment insurance program for another five months. One of the provisions, planned by Senators Jack Reed (D-RI) and Dean Heller (R-NV), would provide the people whose unemployment benefits ended on December 28, 2013 with retroactive benefits. This would affect more than 2 million people.

== Congressional Budget Office report ==
This summary is based largely on the summary provided by the Congressional Budget Office, as ordered reported by the House Committee on Ways and Means on February 4, 2014. This is a public domain source.

H.R. 3979 would amend the Internal Revenue Code to exclude volunteer hours of volunteer firefighters and emergency medical personnel from counting towards the calculation of the number of a firm’s full-time employees for purposes of certain provisions of the Affordable Care Act. Those provisions require certain employers with 50 or more full-time equivalent employees to either offer health care coverage of a certain standard or be subject to penalties.

The Congressional Budget Office (CBO) and the staff of the Joint Committee on Taxation (JCT) estimate that H.R. 3979 would have no significant budgetary effect because the U.S. Treasury Department has issued final regulations that, by CBO’s and JCT’s assessment, provide the same treatment for those groups as H.R. 3979. Enacting H.R. 3979 would not affect direct spending or revenues; therefore, pay-as-you-go procedures do not apply.

JCT has determined that the bill contains no intergovernmental or private-sector mandates as defined in the Unfunded Mandates Reform Act.

== Procedural history ==
The Protecting Volunteer Firefighters and Emergency Responders Act was introduced into the United States House of Representatives on January 31, 2014 by Rep. Lou Barletta (R, PA-11). It was referred to the United States House Committee on Ways and Means. On February 4, 2014, the bill was ordered reported (amended) alongside House Report 113-360. On March 7, 2014, House Majority Leader Eric Cantor announced that H.R. 3979 would be considered under a suspension of the rules on March 11, 2014. At the time, the bill had 106 co-sponsors, 15 of which were Democrats. The House passed the bill in Roll Call Vote 116 410-0 on March 11, 2014.

In the United States Senate, Senate Majority Leader Harry Reid decided to use the bill as a legislative vehicle for passing another extension of federal unemployment for people who have been unemployed a long time. The new bill still contains the original material about volunteer responders, but now focuses on extending unemployment insurance. Reid used the volunteer responders bill as a vehicle "as a way to more easily send the UI extension bill back to the House."

== Debate and discussion ==
=== The Protecting Volunteer Firefighters and Emergency Responders Act ===
Rep. Barletta, who sponsored the bill, argued that it is necessary because the Internal Revenue Service had initially said that it would be requiring organizations to provide these volunteers with insurance, something that would be prohibitively expensive for some of them. The Department of the Treasury, which the IRS is part of, announced on January 10 that these volunteers would not be required to be provided with insurance, but supporters still wanted to make that "crystal clear in statute" instead of relying on a mere rule.

The bill had the supporter of the National Volunteer Fire Council, which said it "appreciates the bi-partisan support that we've received on this issue."

=== Unemployment insurance ===
The House was considered unlikely to take up the Senate's revised bill, since Speaker of the House John Boehner (R-OH) said the House would not be considering the bill since it lacked any measures to improve job creation.

Senator Reid argued that the bill should be passed because "unemployment benefits stimulate the economy quicker and faster than any other thing."

== See also ==
- List of bills in the 113th United States Congress
- Health insurance mandate
- Unemployment in the United States
- Unemployment benefits
