= Charles Alton Ellis =

American engineer (1876–1949)

- Born: 1876; Parkman, Maine
- Died: August 22, 1949 (aged 72–73); Evanston, Illinois
- Occupation: structural engineer
- Known for: Designing the Golden Gate Bridge structure

Charles Alton Ellis (1876–1949) was a professor, structural engineer and mathematician who was chiefly responsible for the structural design of the Golden Gate Bridge. Because of a dispute with Joseph Strauss, he was not recognized for his work when the bridge opened in 1937. His contributions were ultimately recognized at the bridge with a plaque installed in 2012.

== Early life and education ==
Ellis was born in Parkman, Maine in 1876.

He earned a degree in mathematics from Wesleyan University (where he was a member of Delta Kappa Epsilon fraternity). In 1922, he received his graduate certificate in engineering (C.E.) from the University of Illinois.

== Career ==
Ellis took a post at the American Bridge Company, where he worked on the stresses of subway tunnels crossing the Hudson River. Ellis completed coursework to extend his knowledge of structural engineering at the University of Illinois.

In 1922 he was expert enough to author a benchmark textbook in the field, Essentials in the Theory of Framed Structures.

Ellis began working on the Golden Gate Bridge in 1922, the same year he gained his engineering certificate from University of Illinois. He remained with the project until December 1931. He then opened a consultancy practice in Chicago, working as an advisor to the Public Works Administration.

During his career, he was a professor at the University of Michigan, the University of Illinois, and Purdue University. His papers are held at the Purdue University library.

== Golden Gate Bridge structural design ==
Ellis was responsible for the structural design of the bridge, working from the overall design by Strauss.

A dispute over the time it was taking to complete the design led Strauss to accuse Ellis of wasting time and money and to dismiss him from the project. The copy of the engineering drawings for the Golden Gate Bridge on file at the Library of Congress is signed by Ellis but the plaque placed on the bridge in 1937 did not give him any credit.

In 2012, Ellis was officially given recognition for his part in the designing process of the Golden Gate Bridge when a plaque was installed on the south tower to acknowledge his contributions.

== Bibliography ==
- Daniels, Maria (April 16, 2004). "People & Events: Charles Alton Ellis (1876–1949)". American Experience website. Public Broadcasting Service. Archived from the original on March 27, 2009.
- Longsworth, Laura, and Ben Loeterman (producers); Loeterman, Ben (writer, director); Rutenbeck, James (editor) (2004). "Golden Gate Bridge". American Experience. Public Broadcasting Service. Archived from the original on July 11, 2011. yes.
- Morris, Sammie (October 4, 2004). "A Guide to the Charles A. Ellis Papers" (PDF). Purdue University Libraries Archives and Special Collections. West Lafayette Indiana: Purdue University. pp. 4–5.
- van der Zee, John (2000). The Gate: The True Story of the Design and Construction of the Golden Gate Bridge. Backinprint.com. ISBN 978-0-595-09429-5.
