= Burt Shavitz =

American beekeeper

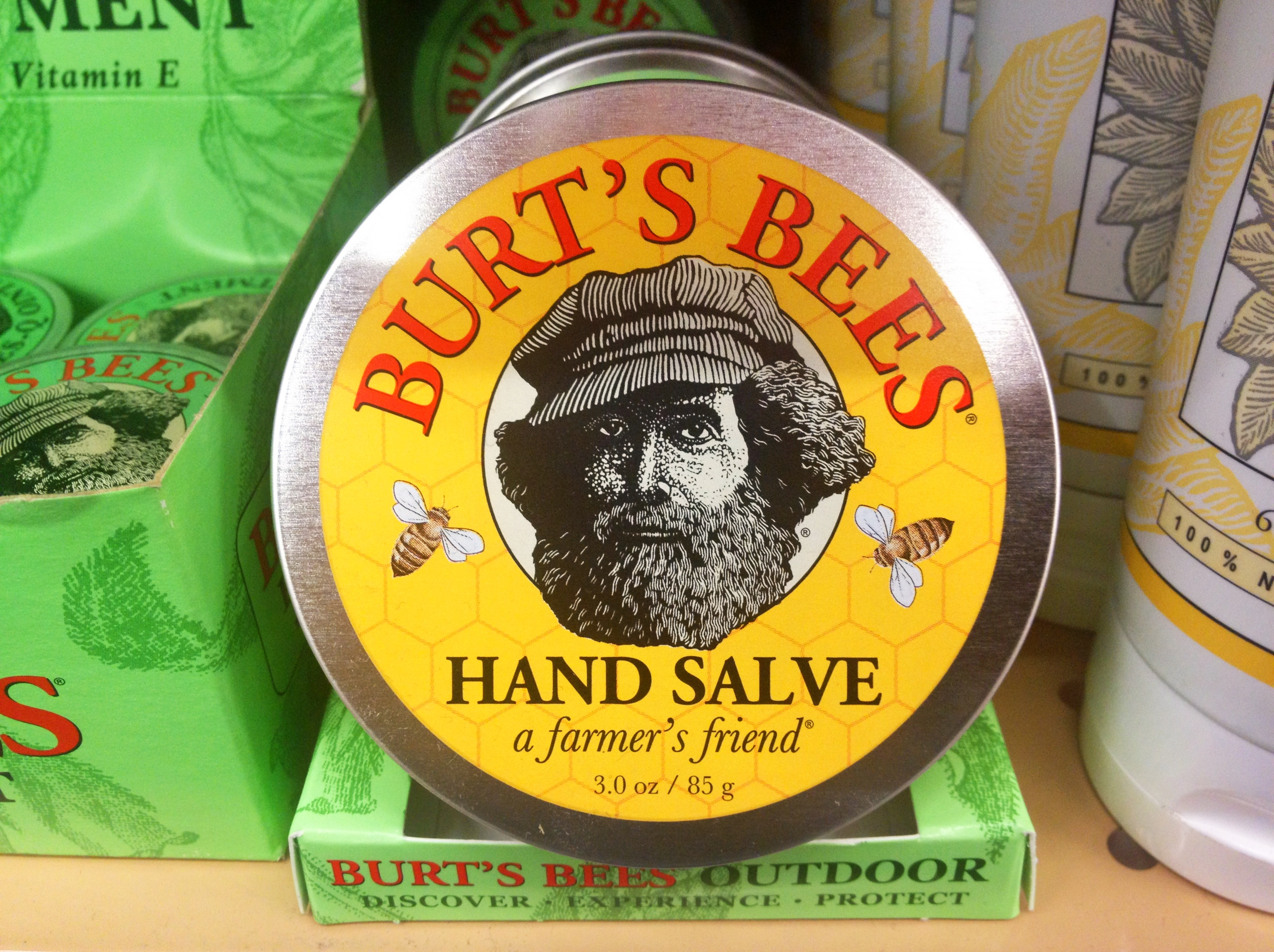
- Drawing of Shavitz on Burt's Bees product
- Born: Ingram Berg Shavitz; May 15, 1935; New York City, U.S.
- Died: July 5, 2015 (aged 80); Bangor, Maine, U.S.
- Occupations: Beekeeper, businessman, photographer
- Known for: Burt's Bees

Ingram “Burt” Berg Shavitz (May 15, 1935 – July 5, 2015) was an American beekeeper and businessman notable for founding the Burt's Bees personal care products company with businesswoman Roxanne Quimby. Shavitz's likeness is featured on the Burt's Bees products.

== Early life ==
Burt Shavitz was born Ingram Shavitz to a Jewish family in Manhattan. He was raised in Great Neck, New York, and changed his name in 1953 when he finished high school. He spent time in the Army, and later while living in Manhattan he took photographs, including those of African American Muslim rallies and Bowery drug-dealers, that appeared in Time and Life magazines.

== Business career ==
Shavitz started as a hobby apiarist in New Paltz, NY, eventually settled in Maine, where he discovered beekeeping as a source of income and met Roxanne Quimby, who would sell his wax candles at local fairs. An increase in sales and production led to them launching Burt's Bees in the 1980s. As the partnership and business grew, operations were set up in North Carolina in 1994. Soon thereafter, the partnership between Shavitz and Quimby waned, leading to Quimby buying out Shavitz's stake in the company. In 2007, Clorox purchased Burt's Bees for more than $900 million. Shavitz was a self-described hippie, an avid outdoorsman who had little regard for material wealth but placed value on land and free open spaces for wildlife.

== Documentary ==
A documentary film, Burt's Buzz, was released in 2014. The film discussed the life of Shavitz, his history with Burt's Bees, and his later activities as a beekeeper and businessman.

== Death ==
Shavitz died on July 5, 2015, at the age of 80 in Bangor, Maine, from respiratory problems. He resided in Parkman, Maine.
