= Erik Paulsen =

American politician (born 1965)

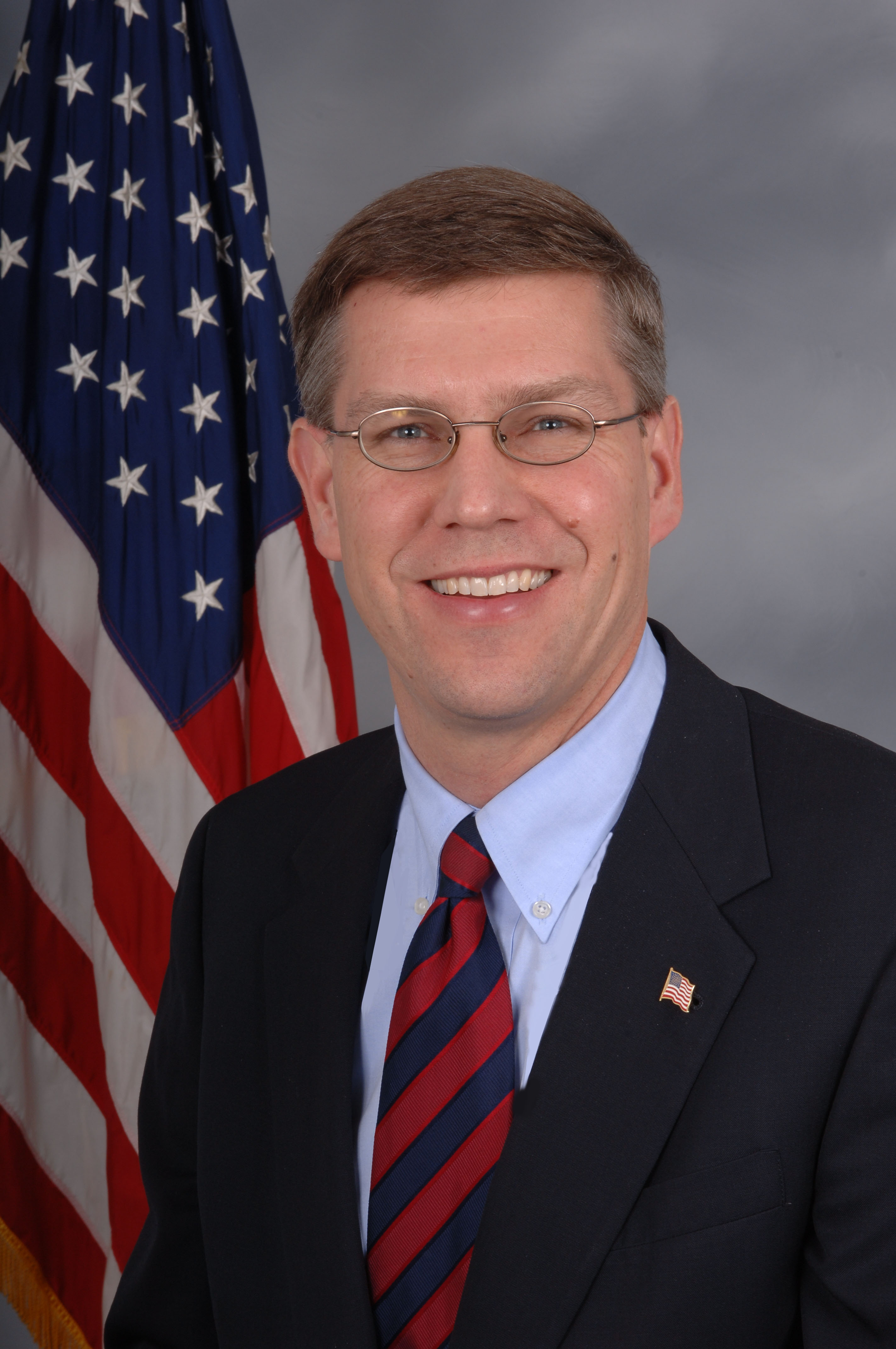
- Official portrait, 2008

Chair of the Joint Economic Committee
- In office January 11, 2018 – January 3, 2019
- Preceded by: Pat Tiberi
- Succeeded by: Mike Lee

Member of the U.S. House of Representatives from Minnesota's 3rd district
- In office January 3, 2009 – January 3, 2019
- Preceded by: Jim Ramstad
- Succeeded by: Dean Phillips

Majority Leader of the Minnesota House of Representatives
- In office January 3, 2003 – January 3, 2007
- Preceded by: Tim Pawlenty
- Succeeded by: Tony Sertich

Member of the Minnesota House of Representatives from the 42B district
- In office January 3, 1995 – January 3, 2009
- Preceded by: Sidney Pauly
- Succeeded by: Jenifer Loon

Personal details
- Born: Erik Philip Paulsen; May 14, 1965 (age 61) Bakersfield, California, U.S.
- Party: Republican
- Spouse: Kelly Paulsen (m. 1993)
- Children: 4
- Education: St. Olaf College (BA)

Erik Philip Paulsen (born May 14, 1965) is an American businessman and politician who represented Minnesota's 3rd congressional district in the United States House of Representatives from 2009 to 2019. A member of the Republican Party, he served in the Minnesota House of Representatives from 1995 to 2009 and as majority leader from 2003 to 2007.

In 1994, Paulsen was elected to the Minnesota House of Representatives from District 42B, which covered part of suburban Eden Prairie, Minnesota. He was reelected six times and, in addition, he was elected by his fellow house Republicans to serve as majority leader from 2003 until 2007. He won the 2008 election to the U.S. House of Representatives in Minnesota’s 3rd congressional district, which covers the western suburbs of the Twin Cities, and succeeded retiring Republican incumbent Jim Ramstad. Paulsen represented the district in Congress for five terms. He easily won reelection four times, but was defeated in his 2018 reelection bid by Democrat Dean Phillips. From 2018 until 2019, he served as chair of the Joint Economic Committee.

== Early life, education, and career ==
Born in Bakersfield, California, Paulsen graduated from Chaska High School in Minnesota in 1983. He attended St. Olaf College, and received a Bachelor of Arts in mathematics in 1987. After college, Paulsen worked as an intern for Republican Senator Rudy Boschwitz from 1989 until Boschwitz was defeated by Democratic challenger Paul Wellstone in 1990. Paulsen then took a staff position with Republican Representative Jim Ramstad in Washington, D.C. He worked on Ramstad's local congressional campaign in 1992 before seeking election to the Minnesota House of Representatives in 1994. He succeeded Sidney Pauly.

From 2007 to 2009 Paulsen worked as a part-time business analyst for Target Corporation while a member of the Minnesota House of Representatives.

== Minnesota House of Representatives ==
Paulsen was elected as member of the Republican Party. Before entering politics he was a businessman. He served on the Commerce and Labor, Rules and Legislative Administration, Taxes, and Ways and Means committees.

== U.S. House of Representatives ==
=== Elections ===
2008

Minnesota's 3rd Congressional district election, 2008
Party	Candidate	Votes	%
Republican	Erik Paulsen	178,932	48.48
Democratic (DFL)	Ashwin Madia	150,787	40.85
Independence	David Dillon	38,970	10.56
Write-In	Others	415	0.11
Total votes		369,104	100.00
Republican hold			

2010

Minnesota's 3rd Congressional district election, 2010
Party	Candidate	Votes	%
Republican	Erik Paulsen (Incumbent)	161,177	58.81
Democratic (DFL)	Jim Meffert	100,240	36.57
Independence	Jon Olseon	12,508	4.56
Write-In	Others	167	0.06
Total votes		274,092	100.00
Republican hold			

2012

Minnesota's 3rd congressional district election, 2012
Party	Candidate	Votes	%
Republican	Erik Paulsen (incumbent)	222,335	58.1
Democratic (DFL)	Brian Barnes	159,937	41.8
n/a	Write-ins	433	0.1
Total votes		382,705	100.0
Republican hold			

2014

Minnesota's 3rd Congressional district election, 2014
Party	Candidate	Votes	%
Republican	Erik Paulsen (incumbent)	167,515	62.14
Democratic (DFL)	Sharon Sund	101,846	37.78
Write-in	Others	224	0.08
Majority		65,669	24.36%
Total votes		269,585	100
Republican hold			

2016

Minnesota's 3rd Congressional district election, 2016
Party	Candidate	Votes	%
Republican	Erik Paulsen (incumbent)	223,077	56.70
Democratic (DFL)	Terri Bonoff	169,243	43.01
	Write-in	1,144	0.29
Total votes		393,464	100
Republican hold			

2018

Minnesota's 3rd congressional district election, 2018
Party	Candidate	Votes	%
Democratic (DFL)	Dean Phillips	202,402	55.61
Republican	Erik Paulsen (incumbent)	160,838	44.19
Democratic (DFL) gain from Republican			

=== Committee assignments ===
- The Bicameral Joint Economic Committee
- The House Committee on Ways and Means
  - Subcommittee on Health
  - Subcommittee on Trade

=== Town halls ===
In 2017 a group of constituents sought signatures on a petition asking Paulsen to hold public town hall meetings. His campaign primarily held townhalls over the phone with campaign aides screening questions, in addition to business tours and private meetings. Paulsen was invited to attend a "With or Without Him" town hall meeting but declined.

On May 30, 2018, Paulsen held three in-person town hall meetings in the 3rd district. During the events he distanced himself from Donald Trump and congressional leaders.

== Political positions ==
Paulsen was a member of the Republican Main Street Partnership, the Republican Study Committee, the Congressional Arts Caucus, the United States Congressional International Conservation Caucus and the Climate Solutions Caucus.

Paulsen opposed the Lilly Ledbetter Fair Pay Act of 2009. He voted against the James Zadroga 9/11 Health and Compensation Act. Paulsen introduced the Text a Tip Act to the House in 2010. The bill would have allowed users to send tips about crimes to a third party, removing all identifying information about the source before the police received the message. The bill died in committee and was not adopted.

In 2010 Paulsen cosponsored a draft of the Small Business Assistance and Relief Act intended to provide increased lending and aid for small businesses and ease their financial burden.

Paulsen supported the special investigation into Russian interference in the 2016 election and Trump's dismissal of James Comey. In February 2017 Paulsen voted against requesting Trump's tax returns from the Treasury Department.

FiveThirtyEight found that Paulsen voted with Trump 98% of the time, and was the third-most partisan Republican in the House when compared to his district's voting patterns.

=== Economy ===
Paulsen helped to author the Republican tax reform of 2017, the Tax Cuts and Jobs Act.

Paulsen supported continuing the Bush-era tax cuts and global free trade agreements. He voted for the fiscal 2012 federal budget plan that provided for substantial overhaul of Medicare, including replacement of the traditional program with a premium support payment for private health insurance coverage for Americans under age 55.

Paulsen voted against the American Recovery and Reinvestment Act and Dodd-Frank.

=== Health care ===
In 2009 Paulsen expressed opposition to a public health insurance option and instead supported a Republican alternative plan. At an April 7, 2010, Republican rally in Minneapolis, Paulsen described the Affordable Care Act as a "government takeover of health care," a claim that Minnesota Public Radio said "isn't correct."

Paulsen voted to repeal the Affordable Care Act. In January 2017 he voted for the budget reconciliation provision to begin the process of ACA repeal.

On May 4, 2017, Paulsen voted to repeal the Patient Protection and Affordable Care Act (Obamacare) and for the American Health Care Act.

In February 2018 Paulsen sponsored legislation to repeal caps on Medicare outpatient services such as physical therapy.

Paulsen introduced legislation to combat opioid abuse by educating seniors about non-opioid alternative pain treatments and ways to safely dispose of addictive painkillers.

=== Immigration ===
Paulsen was a longtime proponent of immigration reform and supported granting temporary legal status to those who were brought to the U.S. illegally as children, saying he supported "ensuring that young people who came to the United States through no fault of their own and have done nothing wrong are able to be valuable contributors to our country."

In May 2018, Paulsen joined House Democrats in signing a "discharge petition" to force the House to vote on a series of immigration bills, including one that would provide permanent legal status to those who came to the country illegally as children.

Paulsen did not support building a wall along the U.S. border with Mexico, citing its projected multi-billion-dollar cost.

=== Environment ===
Paulsen had a lifetime rating of 16% from the League of Conservation Voters. He called for an end to Minnesota's ban on building nuclear power plants, saying that "trying to meet our energy needs without using nuclear energy is a little bit like trying to row a boat with one oar." Along with 95% of Republicans and 17% of Democrats, he voted against the American Clean Energy and Security Act, which would have imposed a cap-and-trade system.

Paulsen voted against allowing copper-sulfide mining in the Boundary Waters Canoe Area.

=== LGBT rights ===
In 2010, Paulsen voted against a bill repealing the U.S. military's "don't ask, don't tell" policy. In 2017, he voted for an amendment that would have defunded transition-related healthcare for transgender soldiers in the military.

=== Guns ===
From 2007 through 2018 Paulsen received $21,150 in campaign contributions from the NRA Political Victory Fund (NRA), which gave him an "A" rating. As of June 2016, he had voted 13 times against bringing gun-safety bills to the House floor.

In February 2018, Paulsen said that he would support a ban on bump stocks, strengthened background checks, a lifting of the ban on federal research for gun violence, and gun violence restraining orders.

In May 2018, Paulsen co-sponsored the Jake Laird Act, which provides grants to encourage states to adopt gun-violence restraining-order laws. Gun-violence restraining orders enable local law enforcement to seize and retain firearms from people who are determined to be an imminent danger to themselves or others.

In December 2017, Paulsen voted for the Concealed Carry Reciprocity Act of 2017, which allows people with a concealed carry permit in one state to legally travel with hidden guns to any other state.

=== Legislation ===
On February 13, 2013, Paulsen introduced the National Park Service 100th Anniversary Commemorative Coin Act (H.R. 627; 113th Congress), a bill that would direct the Secretary of the Treasury to mint and issue gold, silver, and half-dollar clad coins in commemoration of the 100th anniversary of the establishment of the National Park Service (NPS). The coins would all have a surcharge attached, the money from which would be given to the National Park Foundation.

Paulsen strongly supported a bill that would make it easier for nonbank financial institutions such as money service businesses to provide remittance payments internationally. He argued that the bill would make it easier for American immigrants "supporting their extended families overseas" to help their relatives, while still "providing the necessary safeguards to ensure their money reaches its intended destination."

On November 21, 2013, Paulsen introduced the Stop Exploitation Through Trafficking Act of 2013 (H.R. 3610; 113th Congress), a bill that would require each state, within three years, to have in effect legislation that: (1) treats a minor who has engaged or attempted to engage in a commercial sex act as a victim of a severe form of trafficking in persons, (2) discourages the charging or prosecution of such an individual for a prostitution or sex trafficking offense, and (3) encourages the diversion of such individual to child protection services. The bill was scheduled to be voted on in the House on May 20, 2014, under a suspension of the rules.

With Democratic U.S. Senator Amy Klobuchar, Paulsen led an effort to repeal an excise tax on medical devices imposed by the Patient Protection and Affordable Care Act. The bill passed the House one vote shy of a veto-proof majority. A two-year suspension of the tax was included in a 2015 year-end funding bill.

Also in 2015 Paulsen authored a bill to provide tax incentives to encourage food donations and wrote a provision of the National Defense Authorization Act that requires the Department of Defense to return all military working dogs to the United States after completing their service. The American Humane Association strongly advocated passage of this provision.

== Personal life ==
During college at St. Olaf, Paulsen met his wife Kelly. As of 2014, the Paulsens have four daughters and lived in Eden Prairie. He is Lutheran. Paulsen serves as a board member of the Eden Prairie A Brighter Day Foundation, Habitat for Global Learning, Habitat for Technology and the Southdale YMCA. He is a member of the American Council of Young Political Leaders and the Eden Prairie Chamber of Commerce, and volunteers for Learning Exchange.

Paulsen has participated in the inaugural two-year class of the Aspen Rodel Fellowship in Public Leadership, the German Marshall Memorial Fellowship, the Young Leaders Forum of the National Committee on U.S.–China Relations, and the American Council of Young Political Leaders. He has been granted an Aspen Institute Rodel Fellowship in Public Leadership, and a Marshall Memorial Fellowship from the German Marshall Fund of the United States.

== See also ==
- List of United States representatives from Minnesota
- Minnesota's congressional delegations

Minnesota House of Representatives
Preceded by Tim Pawlenty	Majority Leader of the Minnesota House of Representatives; 2003–2007	Succeeded by Tony Sertich
U.S. House of Representatives
Preceded by Jim Ramstad	Member of the U.S. House of Representatives from Minnesota's 3rd congressional district 2009–2019	Succeeded by Dean Phillips
Preceded by Pat Tiberi	Chair of the Joint Economic Committee; 2018–2019	Succeeded by Mike Lee
Party political offices
Preceded by Charlie Dent; Jo Ann Emerson	Chair of the Tuesday Group; 2013–2015; Served alongside: Charlie Dent, Adam Kinzinger	Succeeded by Bob Dold
U.S. order of precedence (ceremonial)
Preceded by Gerry Sikorski as Former U.S. Representative	Order of precedence of the United States as Former U.S. Representative	Succeeded by Denny Smith as Former U.S. Representative
