= William E. Brewster =

American banker, merchant, and politician (1858–1945)

William Edmund Brewster (September 1, 1858 – December 7, 1945) was an American banker, merchant, and politician from Maine. A bank president and longtime owner of a grocery store, Brewster also served three terms in the Maine House of Representatives. He was the father of United States Senator Ralph Owen Brewster

Born in Parkman, Maine, Brewster was a descendant of English official William Brewster, who traveled to Plymouth Colony aboard the Mayflower in 1620. His older brother, Elmer (1854 – 1905), was also a businessman and served in the Maine House (1903 – 1904). He had two sons; Ralph Owen Brewster served two years as Governor (1924 – 1928), three terms in the U.S. House of Representatives (1935 – 1941) and two terms in the U.S. Senate (1941 – 1952).

In business, he was the president of Dexter Savings Bank and First National Bank as well as a trustee of Eastern Trust and Banking Company of Bangor. He also ran a grocery store in Dexter for 50 years. A Republican from Dexter, Brewster served on the Dexter School Board for four years prior to running for the Maine House of Representatives. He was elected to three non-consecutive two-year terms in the Maine House (1918, 1922, and 1926). During his second term, his son, Ralph Owen Brewster, served in the Maine Senate. During his third and final term, the younger Brewster served his second of two terms as Maine's governor.

Brewster died on December 7, 1945, at Plummer Memorial Hospital in Dexter, Maine after a brief illness. William Brewster met members of the Truman Committee, on which his son served, while they stayed in Dexter, Maine. Upon his death in December 1945, President Harry Truman sent a telegram to then Senator Brewster offering his condolences.
