= Beezin' =

Application of lip balm to eyelids

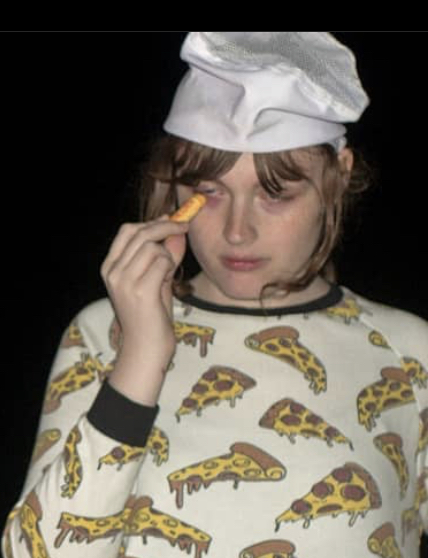
A teenager partaking in Beezin'

Beezin' is the practice of applying Burt's Bees brand lip balm, often menthol or peppermint flavored, to one's eyelids. This practice, besides causing a stinging in the eyes, is purported to induce or heighten the sensation of being drunk or high, or create a state or perceived state of enhanced alertness. Some commentators have claimed that the practice is not widespread as claimed or is entirely made up, an example of a moral panic.

== Dangers ==
Peppermint oil in the product is an eye irritant, with the potential to develop into an inflammatory response requiring treatment. Beezin' can also cause dermatitis in skin areas around the eyes. It has been suggested that Beezin' can also cause pinkeye as well as being a gateway to riskier behaviors.
