= Roxanne Quimby =

American businesswoman

- Born: July 11, 1950 (age 76); Cambridge, Massachusetts, U.S.
- Education: San Francisco Art Institute (BFA)
- Occupations: Business executive; company founder; landowner; conservationist
- Known for: Burt's Bees

Roxanne Quimby (born July 11, 1950) is an American businesswoman notable for founding the North Carolina–based Burt's Bees personal-care products company with the eponymous beekeeper Burt Shavitz.

== Early life and education ==
Quimby was born in Cambridge, Massachusetts, and raised in nearby Lexington, a daughter of an engineer and salesman father and a homemaker mother. Although her family was business-oriented, she initially took a different path, attending San Francisco Art Institute, where she was influenced by the "back to the land" homesteading ideas of Helen and Scott Nearing.

== Career ==
In 1975, she and her boyfriend, George St. Clair, moved to Maine, bought a tract of land near Guilford, built a cabin and outhouse, and lived a rustic lifestyle. In 1978, the couple had twins; a little later, Roxanne left the family to move into another cabin. Eventually she met Burt Shavitz, and in 1984 began selling candles made of his beeswax at local fairs. After achieving a $20,000 profit the first year, the business grew steadily; in 1991 it introduced its best received product, a lip balm. In the 1990s, Quimby threatened to sue Shavitz over personal issues; this ultimately led to Quimby forcing him out of the company by acquiring his shares for $170,000. In 2007 Quimby sold the company to Clorox for more than $900 million.

After turning Burt's Bees over to outside investors, she used her new fortune to deepen her long running conservation advocacy. The most visible action was the purchase of over 120,000 acres of Maine forest, which she then placed off limits to hunters, loggers, and other users. She has since arranged a donation of 70,000 acres of her land towards a new National park located in Maine. An additional donation of 30,000 acres would be managed like a state park and would allow activities such as hunting and snowmobiling. This plan was originally controversial to some Mainers, including then Maine Governor Paul LePage and Maine senators Angus King and Susan Collins. Public opinion became positive after a series of listening sessions and meetings demonstrated positive intentions and the economic opportunities a new national monument would bring. Quimby transferred 87,000 acres of her land to the U.S. Department of the Interior on August 23, 2016, valued at $60 million, along with $20 million in cash to fund operations. This transfer was a prelude to the establishment of a national monument. The Katahdin Woods and Waters National Monument was established on August 24, 2016, the day prior to the 100th anniversary of the National Park Service.

In September 2016, "Quimby . . . added a new parcel to her real estate portfolio on the Schoodic Peninsula – the 113-acre Ocean Wood Campground.... Quimby said she plans to reopen the property and its prime oceanfront camp sites once minor repairs are made". Quimby stated, "I'm pleased to now own this property, which I have admired for many years. It is our intention to restore the existing infrastructure and reopen the campground as soon as minor repairs and improvements can be made. It's our hope that Ocean Wood Campground will once again take its place among the many lovely landscapes and recreational opportunities of the Schoodic Peninsula".

As of 2016, she is a resident of Portland, Maine, where she is a prominent philanthropist and leads a number of charitable organizations in the area. In 2019, she joined the faculty of Unity College in Unity, Maine.

In the 2020s, the Quimby Family Foundation has been donating about $1.5 million per year, mostly to outdoors-related causes in Maine.
