= National Defense Authorization Act for Fiscal Year 2015 =

2015 defense spending bill

Carl Levin and Howard P. "Buck" McKeon National Defense Authorization Act for Fiscal Year 2015
- Long title: To authorize appropriations for fiscal year 2015 for military activities of the Department of Defense, for military construction, and for defense activities of the Department of Energy, to prescribe military personnel strengths for such fiscal year, and for other purposes.
- Nicknames: NDAA 2015
- Announced in: the 113th United States Congress
- Sponsored by: Rep. Buck McKeon (R-CA)

Citations
- Public law: Pub. L. 113–291 (text) (PDF)

Codification
- Authorizations of appropriations: $600 billion for fiscal year 2015

Legislative history
- Introduced in the House as H.R. 4435 by Rep. Buck McKeon (R-CA) on April 9, 2014; Committee consideration by House Ways and Means; Passed the House on March 11, 2014 (410-0, Roll call vote 116, via Clerk.House.gov); Passed the Senate on April 7, 2014 (59-38, Roll call vote 101, via Senate.gov) with amendment; House agreed to Senate amendment on December 4, 2014 (300-119, Roll call vote 551, via Clerk.House.gov) with further amendment; Senate agreed to House amendment on December 12, 2014 (89-11, Roll call vote 325, via Senate.gov); Signed into law by President Barack Obama on December 19, 2014

The Carl Levin and Howard P. "Buck" McKeon National Defense Authorization Act for Fiscal Year 2015 (proposed as H.R. 4435, passed as H.R. 3979, Pub. L. 113–291 (text) (PDF)) was a National Defense Authorization Act. According to the House Armed Services Committee, which oversaw the legislation, the bill would be "the comprehensive legislation to authorize the budget authority of the Department of Defense and the national security programs of the Department of Energy." The total appropriations that are authorized amount to approximately $600 billion for fiscal year 2015.

The bill was introduced into the United States House of Representatives during the 113th United States Congress and signed into law on December 19, 2014.

== Background ==
The National Defense Authorization Act (NDAA) is a United States federal law specifying the budget and expenditures of the United States Department of Defense. Each year's act also includes other provisions "that affect military personnel, retirees, and their family members." The U.S. Congress oversees the defense budget primarily through two yearly bills: the National Defense Authorization Act and defense appropriations bills. The authorization bill determines the agencies responsible for defense, establishes funding levels, and sets the policies under which money will be spent.

This bill was named in honor of Howard P. "Buck" McKeon, because he left his post as chairman of the House Armed Services Committee at the end of the year - along with Carl Levin, the chair of the Senate Armed Services Committee, whom retired at the same time.

== Provisions of the bill ==
- The House proposes to keep the Air Force's fleet of A-10 attack aircraft, which cost $635 million.
- The legislation banned any additional base closures, despite the Pentagon wanting to.
- The bill set the Pentagon's budget level at $495.8 billion.
- The bill included an overseas contingency operations budget of $79.4 billion.
- An additional $17.9 billion was authorized for defense programs in the Department of Energy.

It incorporated the National Park Service 100th Anniversary Commemorative Coin Act.

It established Blackstone River Valley National Historical Park, Harriet Tubman Underground Railroad National Historical Park, Harriet Tubman National Historical Park, Manhattan Project National Historical Park, and Valles Caldera National Preserve and authorized the National Desert Storm and Desert Shield Memorial and Coltsville National Historical Park which as of December 2020 has not yet been established.

== Clarification to the Bill ==
Original versions of the bill would exempt the Department of Defense from having to adhere to the energy efficiency rules in the Energy Independence and Security Act of 2007. This portion of the bill was removed prior to the NDAA2015 being passed.

== Congressional Budget Office report ==
This summary is based largely on the summary provided by the Congressional Budget Office, as ordered reported by the House Committee on Armed Services on May 8, 2014. This is a public domain source.

The Congressional Budget Office (CBO) has completed a preliminary estimate of the direct spending effects of H.R. 4435, the Howard P. "Buck" McKeon National Defense Authorization Act for Fiscal Year 2015, as ordered reported by the House Committee on Armed Services on May 8, 2014. CBO's complete cost estimate for H.R. 4435, including discretionary costs, will be provided shortly.

Based on legislative language for H.R. 4435, which was provided to CBO on May 9, 2014, CBO estimates that enacting this bill would decrease net direct spending by $1 million in 2015, but increase such spending by $1 million over the 2015-2024 period (see attached table). Because the bill would affect direct spending, pay-as-you-go procedures apply.

A provision to authorize special immigrant visas for certain Afghan allies would increase direct spending by $70 million over that 10-year period. Those costs would be offset by a provision that would increase, by $70 million, receipts from sales of material from the National Defense Stockpile. The bill also would require the United States Secretary of Defense to award the Purple Heart to certain service members who were killed or wounded in attacks in the United States that were motivated or inspired by foreign terrorist organizations. Enacting that provision would increase military retirement payments to some of those awardees by a total of about $1 million over the 2015-2024 period.

== Procedural history ==
The Howard P. "Buck" McKeon National Defense Authorization Act for Fiscal Year 2015 was introduced into the United States House of Representatives on April 9, 2014, by Rep. Buck McKeon (R-CA). It was referred to the United States House Committee on Armed Services, the United States House Armed Services Subcommittee on Military Personnel, the United States House Armed Services Subcommittee on Readiness, the United States House Armed Services Subcommittee on Tactical Air and Land Forces, the United States House Armed Services Subcommittee on Intelligence, Emerging Threats and Capabilities, the United States House Armed Services Subcommittee on Seapower and Projection Forces, and the United States House Armed Services Subcommittee on Strategic Forces. On May 8, 2014, the House Armed Services Committee ordered the bill reported (amended) by a vote of 61–0. The Committee spent 12 hours debating the bill and voting on hundreds of different amendments before voting to pass it. House Report 113-446 about the bill was released on May 13, 2014.

== Debate and discussion ==
The House was expected to debate military sexual assault, closing military bases, and immigration in the process of debating this bill.

Officials in the Defense Department "have repeatedly said that base closures are needed in order to reduce excess infrastructure, but members of Congress are resistant to the idea due to fears that bases in their districts could be closed."

A proposal in Section 3003, titled "Southeast Arizona Land Exchange", is opposed by many Native Americans, including the 57 member tribes of The Affiliated Tribes of Northwest Indians, and by the Great Plains Tribal Chairmen's Association. This proposal would permit a subsidiary of the Rio Tinto mining conglomerate, Resolution Copper, to acquire 2,400 acres of the Tonto National Forest, including Oak Flat which is considered sacred for the San Carlos Apache Tribe, for purposes of copper mining.

== Passage ==
The Bill was signed into law on December 19, 2014.

The bill that was passed began as an unrelated provision, the Protecting Volunteer Firefighters and Emergency Responders Act. This original bill was replaced by the defense bill.

== Never Contract with the Enemy Act ==
Sections 841 to 843 of the Act, known at the Never Contract with the Enemy Act, require the United States Secretary of Defense to establish programs in each of its global military commands to ensure that contracting, grant awarding and formation of cooperative agreements do not facilitate the payment of funds (or the provision of goods and services in kind) to persons or entities which are "actively opposing United States or coalition forces involved in a contingency operation in which members of the Armed Forces are actively involved in hostilities".

The Act has extended to a global context similar provisions which related only to combat operations in Iraq and Afghanistan.

== See also ==
- List of bills in the 113th United States Congress
