= Will Shafroth =

American conservationist (born 1957)

- Born: June 3, 1957 (age 69)
- Education: Bachelor of Arts in Political Science and Environmental Studies, University of California, Santa Barbara Master of Public Administration, Harvard Kennedy School

Will Shafroth (born June 3, 1957) is an American conservationist and outdoor recreation enthusiast whose professional career has been in preservation and protection of public lands. Since July 2015, Shafroth has served as president and CEO of the National Park Foundation.

Shafroth has been a board member for The Water Institute of the Gulf since 2013. He previously served as a board member of the Land Trust Alliance, the Resources Legacy Fund, the National Fish and Wildlife Foundation and as commissioner of the Marin County Planning Commission.

== Early life ==
Shafroth is a fourth-generation Coloradan, born in Denver and raised in Arapahoe County. His great-grandfather, John F. Shafroth, was a former member of the US House, US Senate, and the Governor of Colorado, and best remembered as the author of the Antiquities Act. He was also an author of the Jones Shafroth Act, which gave Puerto Ricans US citizenship.

In 1980, Shafroth received a Bachelor of Arts degree in Political Science and Environmental Studies from the University of California at Santa Barbara, followed by a Master of Public Administration from Harvard Kennedy School in 1991.

== Career ==
Shafroth served as Western Regional Director of the American Farmland Trust from 1982 to 1990. There he worked with private landowners to conserve their land, establish local land conservation organizations, advance statewide farmland conservation policies, and increase public awareness of the need to conserve high-quality farmland.

He also served as Assistant Secretary for Land and Coastal Resources under Governor Pete Wilson from 1991 to 1994. His responsibilities included developing statewide wetlands, rivers, and farmland conservation plans, serving on the CA Coastal Commission and State Coastal Conservancy boards, and representing the state in the establishment of the 5400 square mile Monterey Bay National Marine Sanctuary.

Shafroth was hired as the first executive director of Great Outdoors Colorado (GOCO), an organization that funds conservation, recreation, and education projects and programs. During his seven years at GOCO, more than $260 million was invested throughout the state.

In 2000, Shafroth launched the Colorado Conservation Trust (CCT), a statewide community foundation focused on land conservation in Colorado. During his seven-year tenure, CCT raised more than $18 million and leveraged another $30 million in conservation investments.

At the request of Secretary of the Interior Ken Salazar, Shafroth served as principal deputy assistant secretary for Fish and Wildlife and Parks at the Department of the Interior from February 2009 until June 2011. This role advanced the work of the National Park Service and the U.S. Fish and Wildlife Service. Shafroth helped to reopen the crown of the Statue of Liberty which had been closed since 9/11 and to establish new national park units and national wildlife refuges, including Fort Monroe—the first spot to receive Africans on British-occupied land in the present-day United States.

As the Counselor to the Secretary for America's Great Outdoors Initiative, Shafroth led the Department of the Interior's work on President Obama's initiative focused on conservation, recreation and reconnecting people to the outdoors. Shafroth designed and led a nationwide public engagement exercise involving local and state officials, nonprofits and private sector interests in all 50 states. Secretary Salazar also assigned Shafroth to oversee the department's work on Hurricane Sandy recovery.

After leaving the public sector in 2013, Shafroth launched Red Sheep Consulting – a consulting firm focused on supporting nonprofit leaders and conservation groups – Shafroth joined the National Park Foundation in July 2015 in his present role as president and CEO.

Shafroth's insights have been featured in print, and online publications, including his Newsweek op-ed on the National Park Foundation's work with veterans and his WBUR co-authored op-ed about how much the American public values national parks. Broadcast placements include Spectrum News NY1 and SiriusXM Urban View.

== Politics ==
In 2008, Will Shafroth ran as a Democratic primary candidate to replace Mark Udall in Colorado's 2nd congressional district. Shafroth won the endorsement of both major newspapers in the area and many local and state leaders. He was defeated by Jared Polis.

== Personal life ==
Shafroth lives in Washington, D.C. and is the father of three adult children, including fashion designer Lily Forbes. His career has been committed to public service, particularly the conservation of land, water, and wildlife. Shafroth enjoys playing tennis, biking, hiking, fishing, and canoeing.
