= Burt's Bees =

American personal care product and subsidiary of Clorox

- Type: Subsidiary
- Founded: 1984; 42 years ago, in Dover-Foxcroft, Maine, U.S.
- Founders: Burt Shavitz; Roxanne Quimby
- Headquarters: Durham, North Carolina, U.S.
- Area served: United States; United Kingdom; Ireland; Canada; Australia; Germany; Hong Kong; Taiwan; New Zealand
- Key people: Mariah Eckhardt (VP & General Manager)
- Products: Natural personal care products
- Revenue: US$250 million (2006)
- Number of employees: 420 (2005)
- Parent: Clorox (2007–present)
- Website: burtsbees.com

Burt's Bees is an American multinational company that makes products for health, beauty, and personal care. Founded in Maine in 1984, Burt's Bees started as a small business selling hand-crafted beeswax candles. It expanded in the 1990s, selling soaps, lip balms, perfumes, and other products as an "Earth-friendly, Natural Personal Care Company".

In 2007, Burt's Bees was acquired by Clorox. Its products are distributed globally.

== History ==
=== 1984–1989: Founding ===
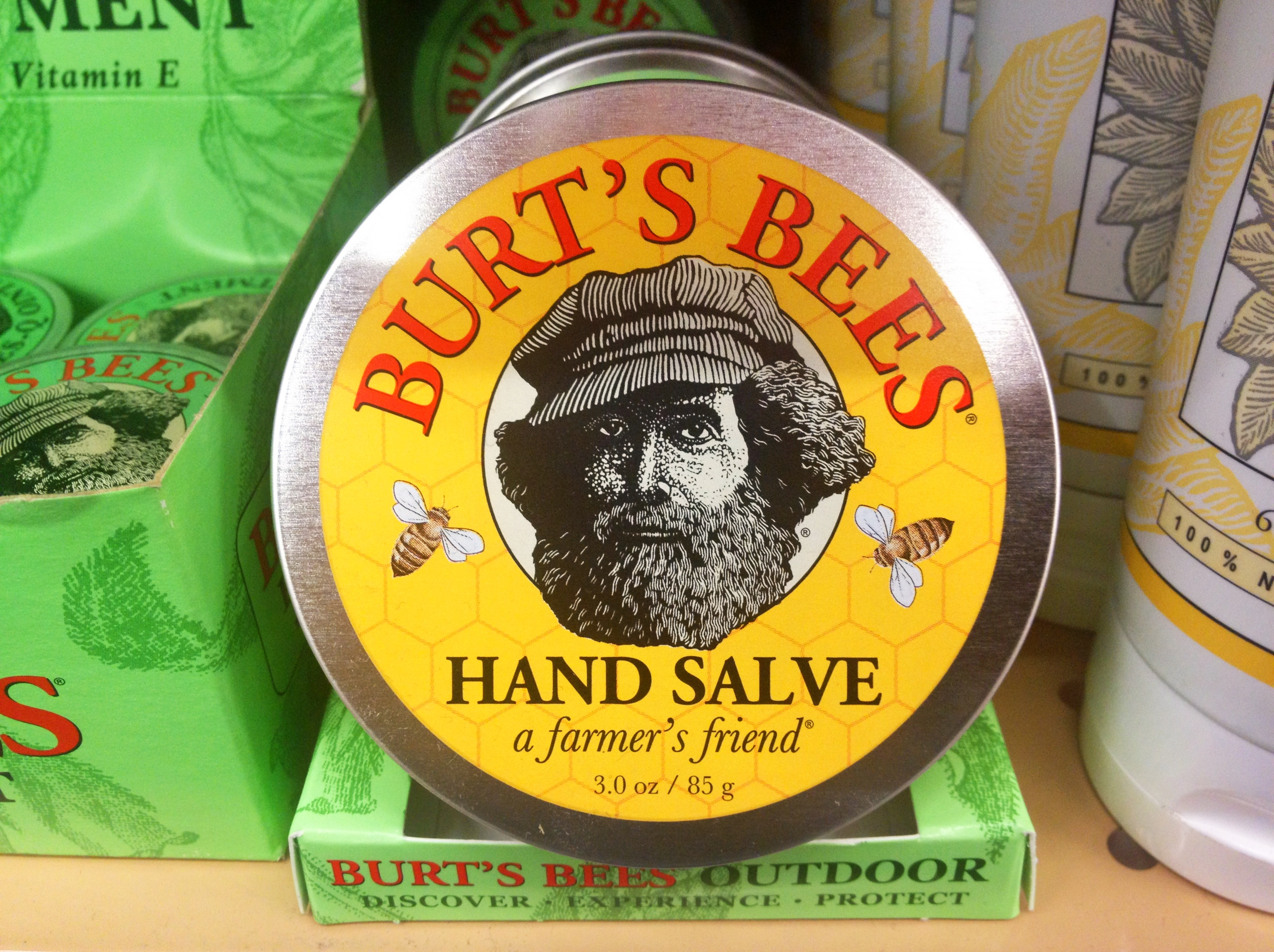
Burt's Bees Hand Salve, Sep 2012

Originating in Maine in the 1980s, the business began when co-founder Roxanne Quimby started making candles from Burt Shavitz's leftover beeswax. The first headquarters was an abandoned one-room schoolhouse rented from a friend for $150 a year. This eventually led to the bottling and selling of honey by the two co-founders, and Quimby's focus on maintaining high quality helped to grow the business from an initial $200 at the Dover-Foxcroft Junior High School craft fair to $20,000 in sales by the end of its first year.

The practice of bottling honey slowly diminished as the company evolved as a corporation. The company eventually began selling other products that used honey and beeswax, including furniture polish and edible spreads, before moving more fully into personal care products.

Burt's Bees increased production in 1989, after a New York City boutique, Zona, ordered hundreds of their beeswax candles. The company hired 40 additional employees and started manufacturing products in an abandoned bowling alley. During this time, Quimby read one of Burt Shavitz's 19th-century books about bee-keeping that included recipes for personal care products, prompting Burt's Bees to shift into the personal care products industry.

=== 1990s: Incorporation and diversification ===
Burt's Bees incorporated in 1991 with a product line that included candles, natural soaps, perfumes, and, eventually, lip balm, which became their best-selling product.

In 1994, the business moved to North Carolina. Soon after, Quimby forced Shavitz out of the company's operations after learning he was having an affair with an employee. Burt's Bees changed its focus to exclusively personal care products. In 1995, the company moved its manufacturing operations into a 18,000-square-foot (1,700 m^{2}) former garment factory in Creedmoor, North Carolina. Although Burt's Bees continued to focus on the "homemade" product theme, automated machines, such as a former cafeteria mixer from Duke University, were introduced to increase production. Chapel Hill was the site of the first Burt's Bees retail store, which offered 50 natural personal care products, and distribution had also reached the Japanese market.

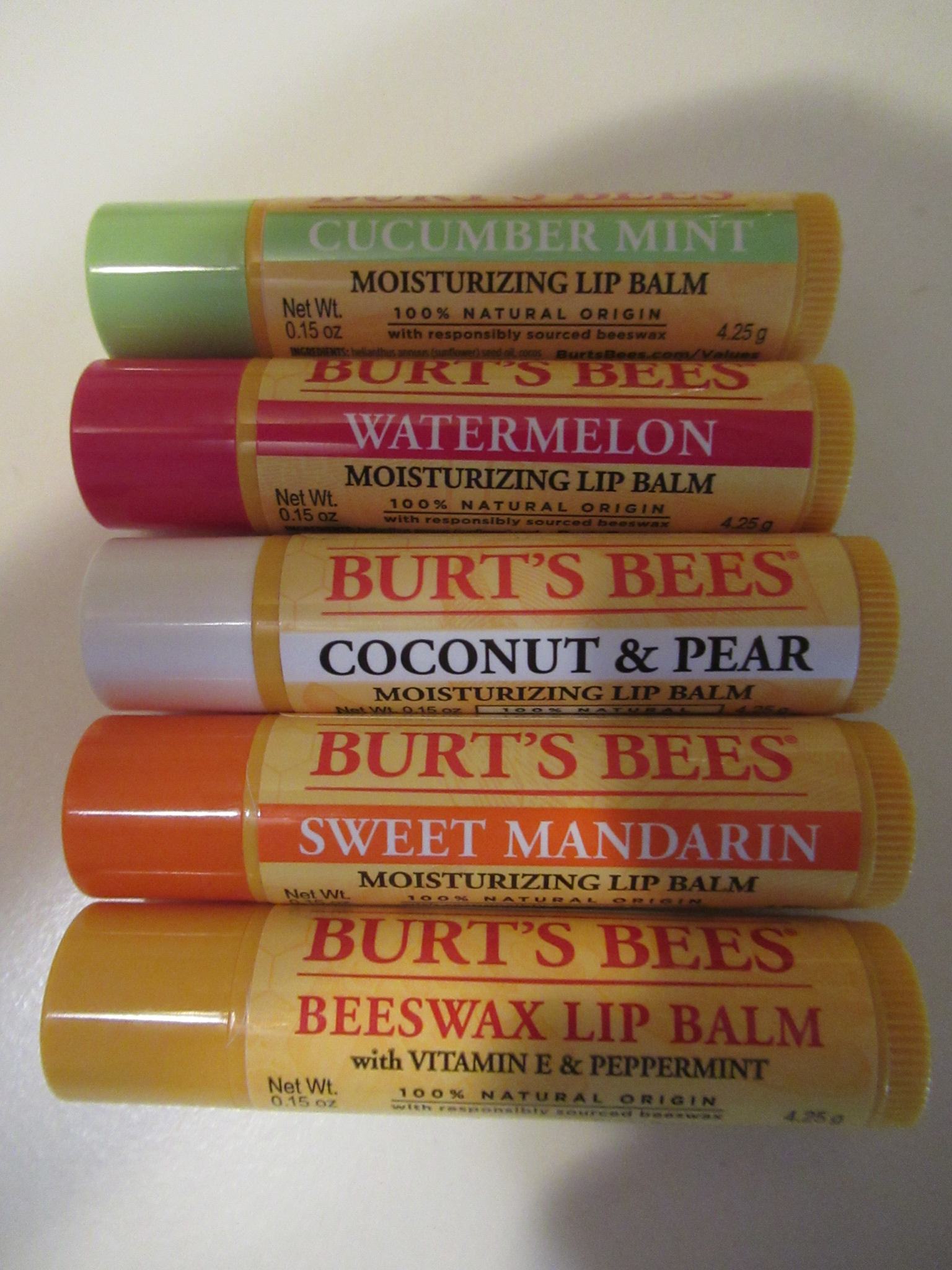
Burts Bees Lip Balm. Top to down: Cucumber Mint, Watermelon, Coconut & Pear, Sweet Mandarin, Original.

In 1998, Burt's Bees was offering over 100 natural personal care products in 4,000 locations with sales in excess of $8 million. Distribution had reached national retailers, such as Whole Foods Market, and restaurant chains, such as Cracker Barrel. New product offerings branched into travel-sized skin care and hair care products. In 1999, with increasing demand and an increase in product offerings, including sugar and milk-based body lotions and bath products; Burt's Bees relocated to Durham among the many other enterprises located in the Research Triangle area of North Carolina. An eCommerce website was launched, increasing distribution to a much larger, nationwide scale.

In 1999, Quimby bought out Shavitz's one-third stake in the company, in exchange for a house in Maine, valued at approximately $130,000.

=== 2000–2006: New products and AEA ===
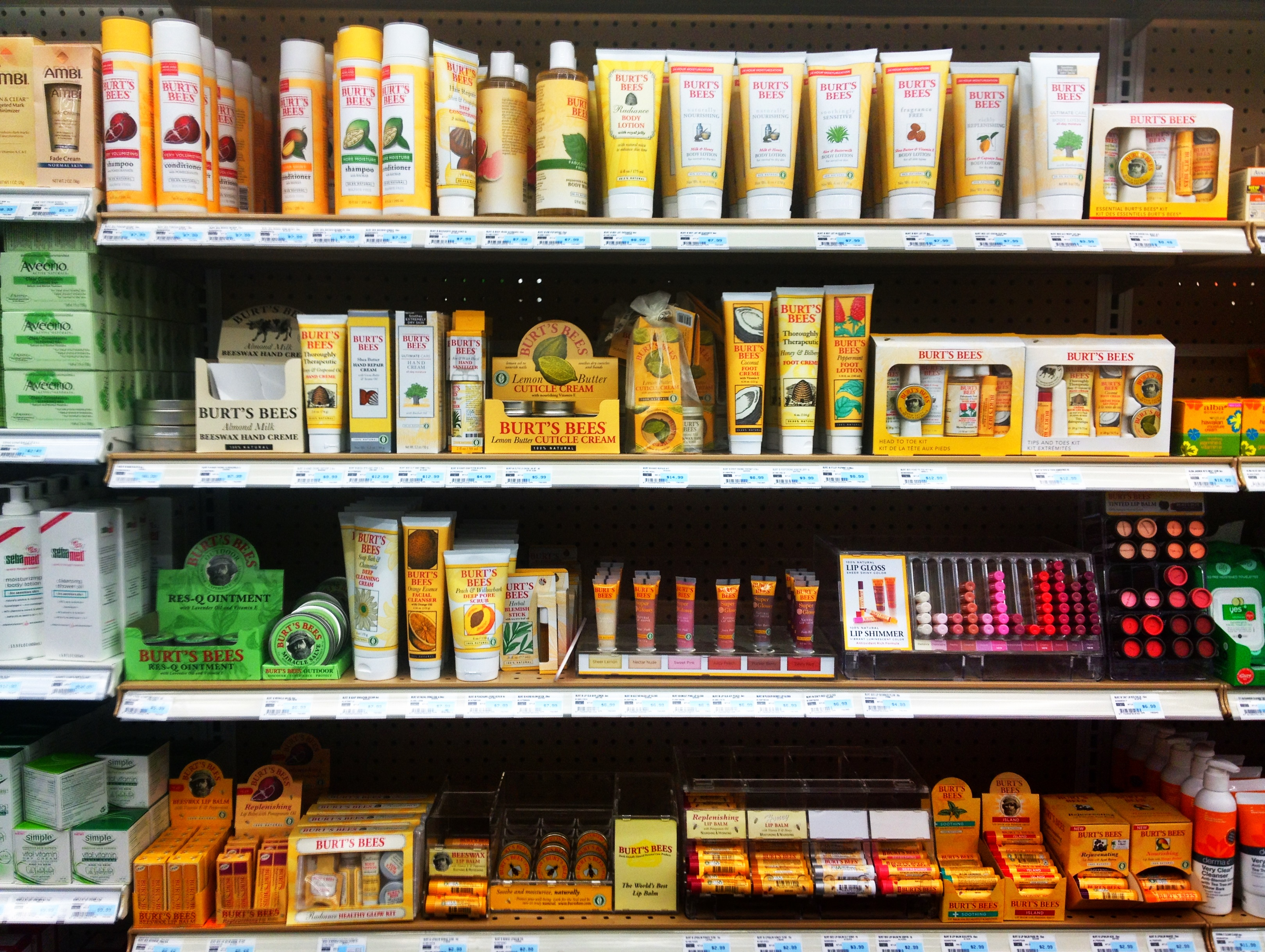
Burt's Bees Products, Sep 2012

During 2002 and 2003, Burt's Bees launched its first toothpaste, first shampoo, and its successful Baby Bee product line of infant personal care products. Co-founder Quimby also used company-earned profits to preserve 185,000 acres (750 km^{2}) of forest land in Maine, marking the beginning of a relationship with The Nature Conservancy, an international organization engaged in environmental protection and conservation.

In 2004, private equity firm AEA Investors purchased 80% of Burt's Bees for US$173,000,000, with co-founder Quimby retaining a 20% share, and a seat on the company board. Upon seeking compensation from Quimby, after the deal, Shavitz was paid $4 million.

=== 2007–present: Clorox acquisition ===
As of 2007, the company manufactured over 197 products, which are distributed globally. In late 2007, Clorox acquired Burt's Bees for a reported sum of $925 million USD. The company subsequently released a statement to its customers.

In February 2011, Burt's Bees CEO (2006–2011) John Replogle left to become CEO and president of Seventh Generation Inc. In 2011, Nick Vlahos, a 15-year veteran of The Clorox Company, was named vice president and general manager of Burt's Bees, effective April 2011. In 2017, Vlahos left Clorox and was named CEO of the Honest Company. By February 2014, the Clorox Company had increased "advertising and sales promotion spending for Burt's Bees, particularly for its lip care lines". At the time, "Burt's Bees sales [were] outpacing volume due to price increases".

Co-founder Shavitz died in July 2015 at the age of 80 and was buried in Bangor, Maine. In his final years, he had lived on a 37-acre (15 ha) plot of land in Parkman, Maine.

In 2017, Burt's Bees introduced a full cosmetics line, including products such as foundation, mascara, eye shadow, and blush.

As of March 2018, Burt's Bees lip balm had reached such a level of popularity that some reports claimed one tube of the lip balm was purchased every second.

In 2022, Burt's Bees announced a multi-year partnership with rePurpose Global to finance a critical recycling infrastructure that prevents plastic waste from flowing into the ocean.

In January 2024, the company announced a partnership with Hidden Valley Ranch to introduce limited-edition flavors including regular ranch, buffalo sauce, crunchy celery, and fresh carrot. The products came in response to an April Fool's social media post.

=== Documentary film ===
In August 2014, a documentary film, Burt's Buzz, by Jody Shapiro, which details the history between the company co-founders, was released.

== See also ==
- Beezin', a trend in which people apply Burt’s Bees lip balm to the eyelids
