= AEA Investors =

U.S. investment firm

AEA Investors LP
- Company type: Private
- Industry: Private equity
- Founded: 1968; 58 years ago
- Headquarters: 520 Madison Avenue; New York City, New York, United States
- Key people: John Garcia (CEO and chairman)
- Services: Leveraged buyout; Growth capital; Mezzanine capital
- AUM: US$19 billion (2023)
- Website: www.aeainvestors.com

AEA Investors LP is an American middle market private equity firm. The firm focuses on leveraged buyout, growth capital, and mezzanine capital investments in manufacturing, service, distribution, specialty chemicals, consumer product, and business services companies in the middle market. The firm makes investments primarily in the US and Europe, and periodically invests in Asia as well.

AEA was founded in 1968 to make investments on behalf of S.G. Warburg & Co. as well as the Rockefeller, Mellon, and Harriman families. AEA was formally founded as American European Associates.

AEA is headquartered in New York City with offices in Stamford, Connecticut, London, Munich, and Shanghai. From 1998 until 2011, the firm was chaired by Vincent Mai. John Garcia is the current CEO and Chairman.

== Fund raising ==
Since 1983, the firm has raised more than $15 billion of capital from high-net-worth individuals and institutional investors across its private equity and debt funds.

Middle Market Private Equity:

- $500 million - AEA Fund I
- $1.0 billion - AEA Fund II
- 2003 - $1.2 billion - AEA Fund III Investment Program
- 2006 - $1.5 billion - AEA Fund IV Investment Program
- 2012 - $2.4 billion - AEA Fund V Investment Program
- 2016 - $3.2 billion - AEA Fund VI Investment Program
- 2019 - $4.8 billion - AEA Fund VII Investment Prog

Small Business Private Equity:

- 2004 - $286 million - AEA Small Business Fund I
- 2009 - $350 million - AEA Small Business Fund II
- 2016 - $443 million - AEA Small Business Fund III
- 2019 - $877 million - AEA Small Business Fund IV

Mezzanine Debt:

- 2005 - $600 million (includes leverage) - AEA Mezzanine Fund I
- 2008 - $420 million - AEA Mezzanine Fund II
- 2013 - $575 million - AEA Mezzanine Fund III

Middle Market Debt:

- 2007 - $320 million (includes leverage) - AEA Middle Market Debt Fund I
- 2011 - $410 million (includes leverage) - AEA Middle Market Debt Fund II
- 2012 - $220 million (includes leverage) - AEA Middle Market Debt Fund IIP

== Investments ==
- Evoqua Water Technologies LLC
- Acosta Inc.
- Hospitalists Management Group, LLC
- NCGA holdings
- Behavioral Interventions Inc.
- Suncoast Roofing Supply
- Houghton International
- Unifrax Corporation
- Pregis
- CPG International
- Henry Corporation
- Convenience Food Systems
- Singer Equities
- Burt's Bees (sold to Clorox in 2007)
- Brand Networks
- Pro Mach Group, Inc.
- Dayton Parts, LLC.
- 24 Hour Fitness
- Jack's
- Veseris
- Scan Global Logistics
- Melissa & Doug

== See also ==
- List of private equity firms
