= 114th United States Congress =

2015–2017 U.S. legislative term

←	113th	115th	→
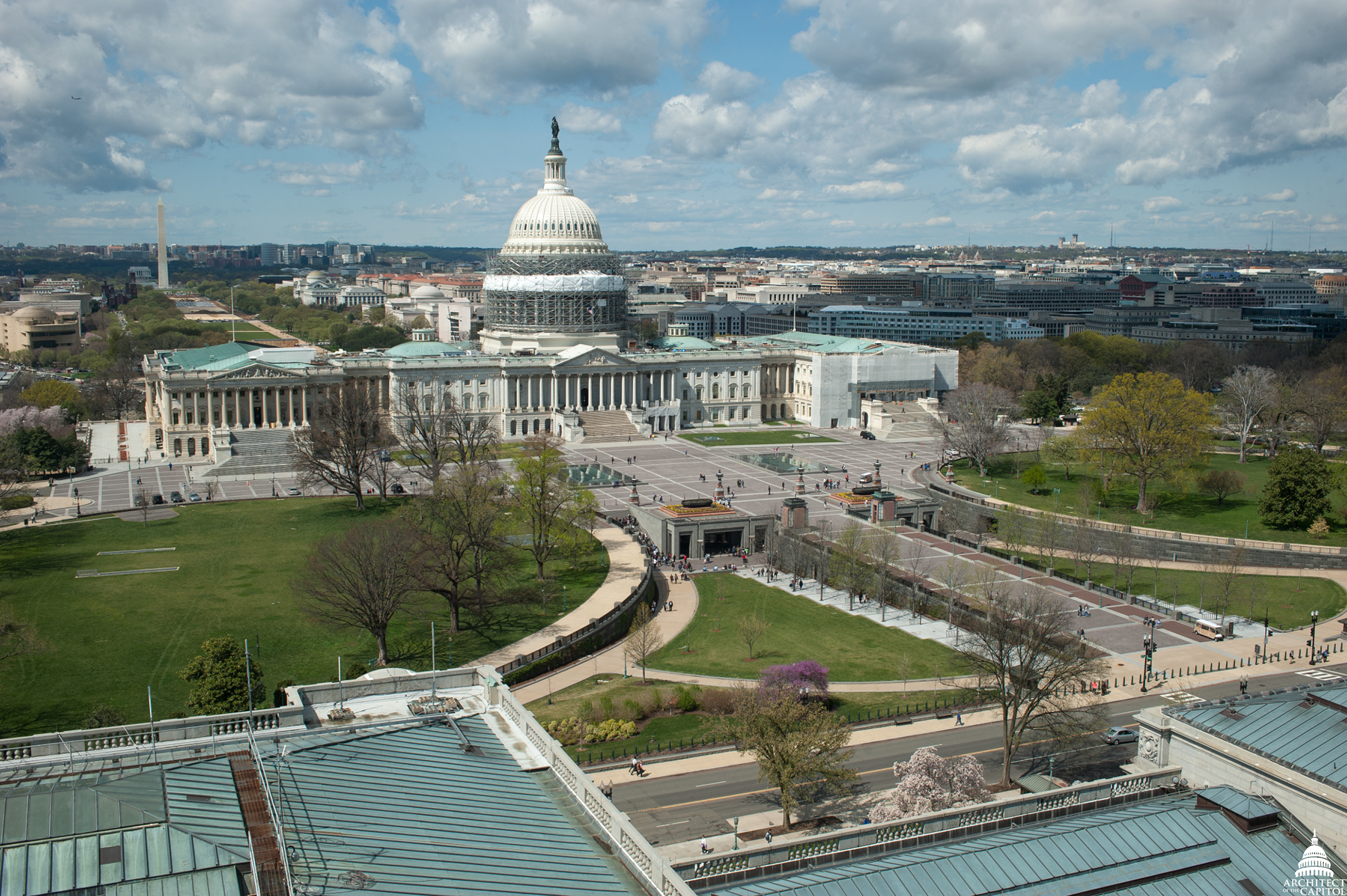
- United States Capitol (2016)

Overview
- Legislative body: United States Congress
- Jurisdiction: United States
- Term: January 3, 2015 – January 3, 2017

Senate
- Members: 100
- President: Joe Biden (D)
- President pro tempore: Orrin Hatch (R)
- Party control: Republican

House of Representatives
- Members: 435 representatives 6 non-voting delegates
- Speaker: John Boehner (R) (until October 29, 2015); Paul Ryan (R) (from October 29, 2015)
- Party control: Republican

Sessions
- 1st: January 6, 2015 – December 18, 2015
- 2nd: January 4, 2016 – January 3, 2017

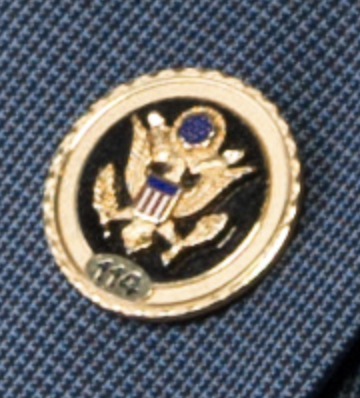
House of Representatives member pin for the 114th U.S. Congress

The 114th United States Congress was a meeting of the legislative branch of the United States of America federal government, composed of the United States Senate and the United States House of Representatives. It met in Washington, D.C., from January 3, 2015, to January 3, 2017, during the final two years of Barack Obama's presidency. The seats in the House were apportioned based on the 2010 United States census.

The 2014 elections gave the Republicans control of the Senate and the House for the first time since the 109th Congress. With 248 seats in the House of Representatives and 54 seats in the Senate, this Congress began with the largest Republican majority since the 71st Congress of 1929–1931. Prior to 2027, this had been the most recent Congress in which the Senate was controlled by the opposing party of the president for its entire session.

== Major events ==
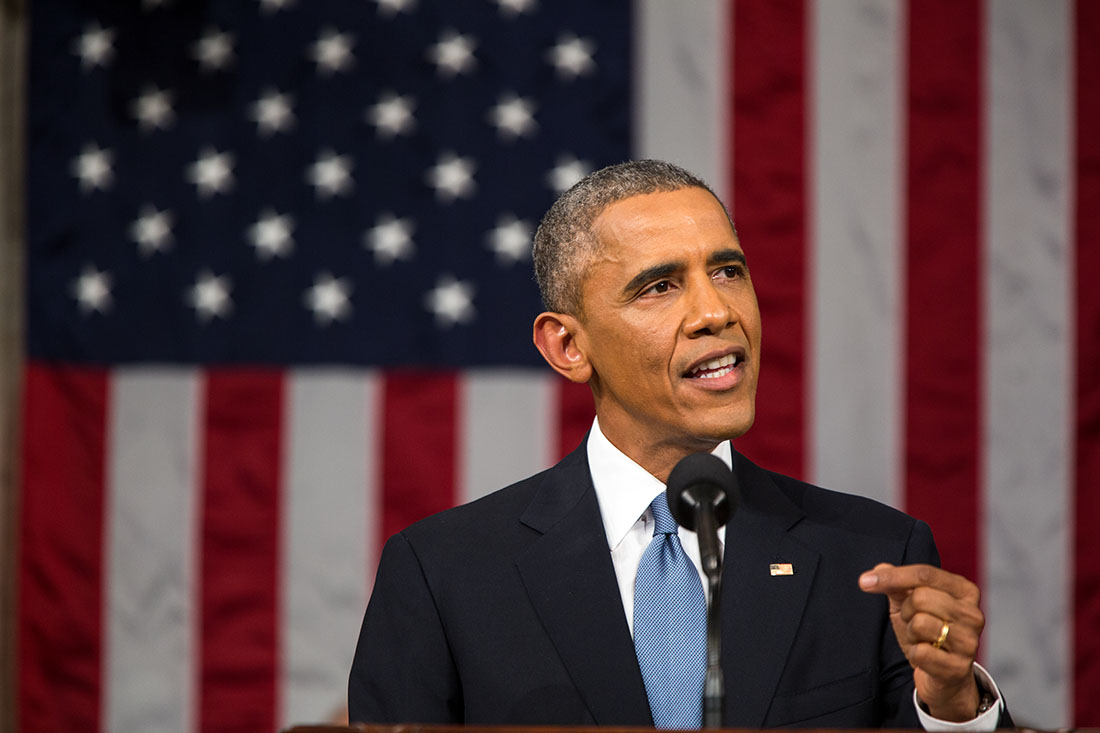
President Barack Obama gave the State of the Union Address on January 20, 2015

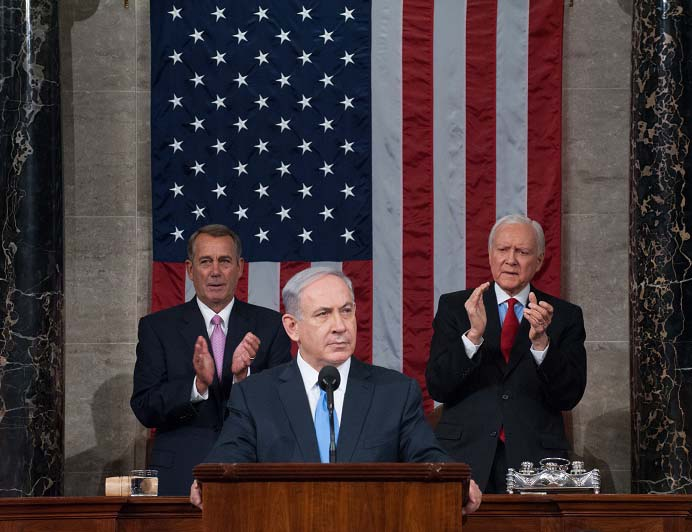
Prime Minister of Israel Benjamin Netanyahu addressed Congress on March 3, 2015

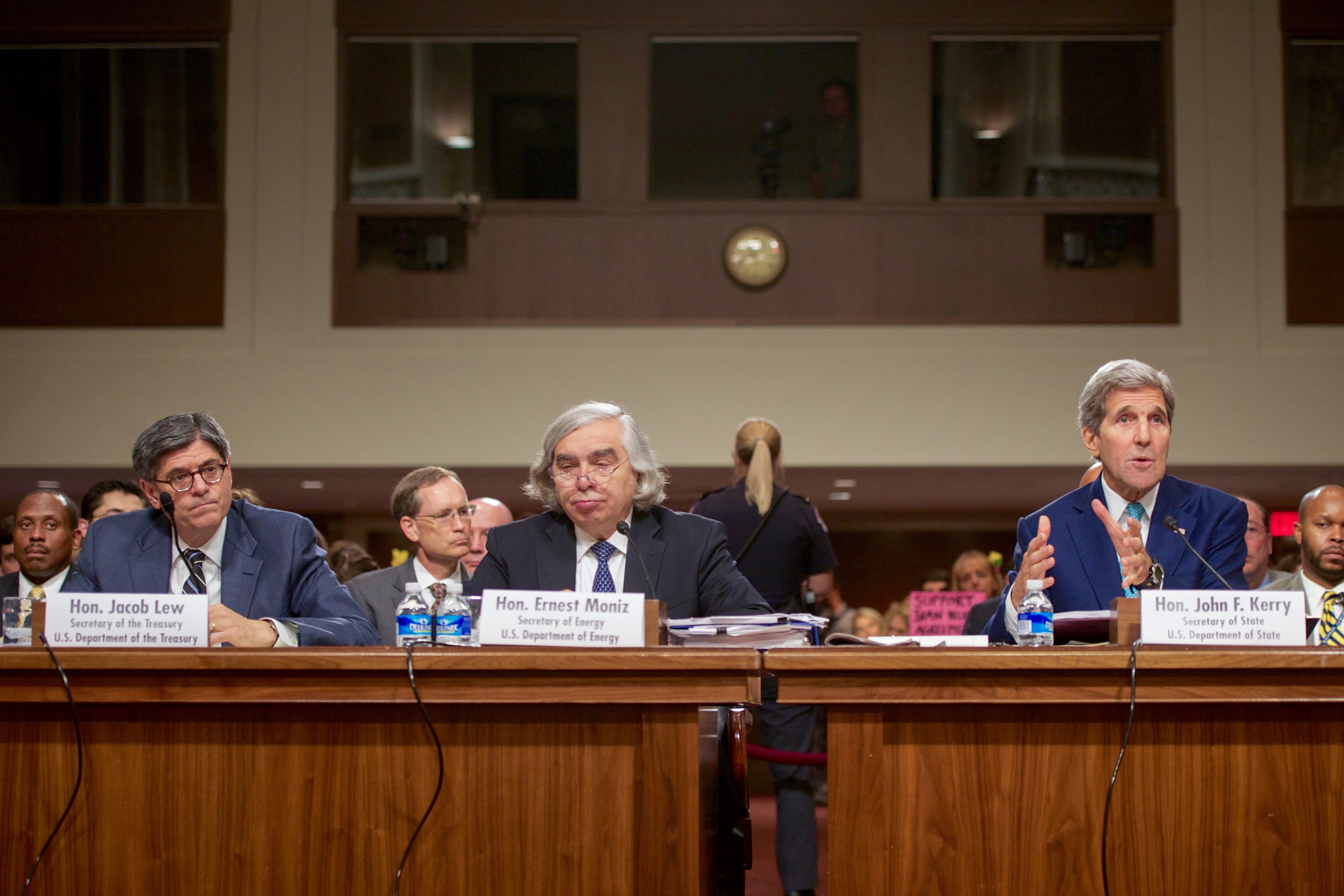
Secretary of State John Kerry, Secretary of Energy Ernest Moniz, and Secretary of the Treasury Jack Lew defended the Joint Comprehensive Plan of Action at a hearing of the Senate Foreign Relations Committee on July 23, 2015

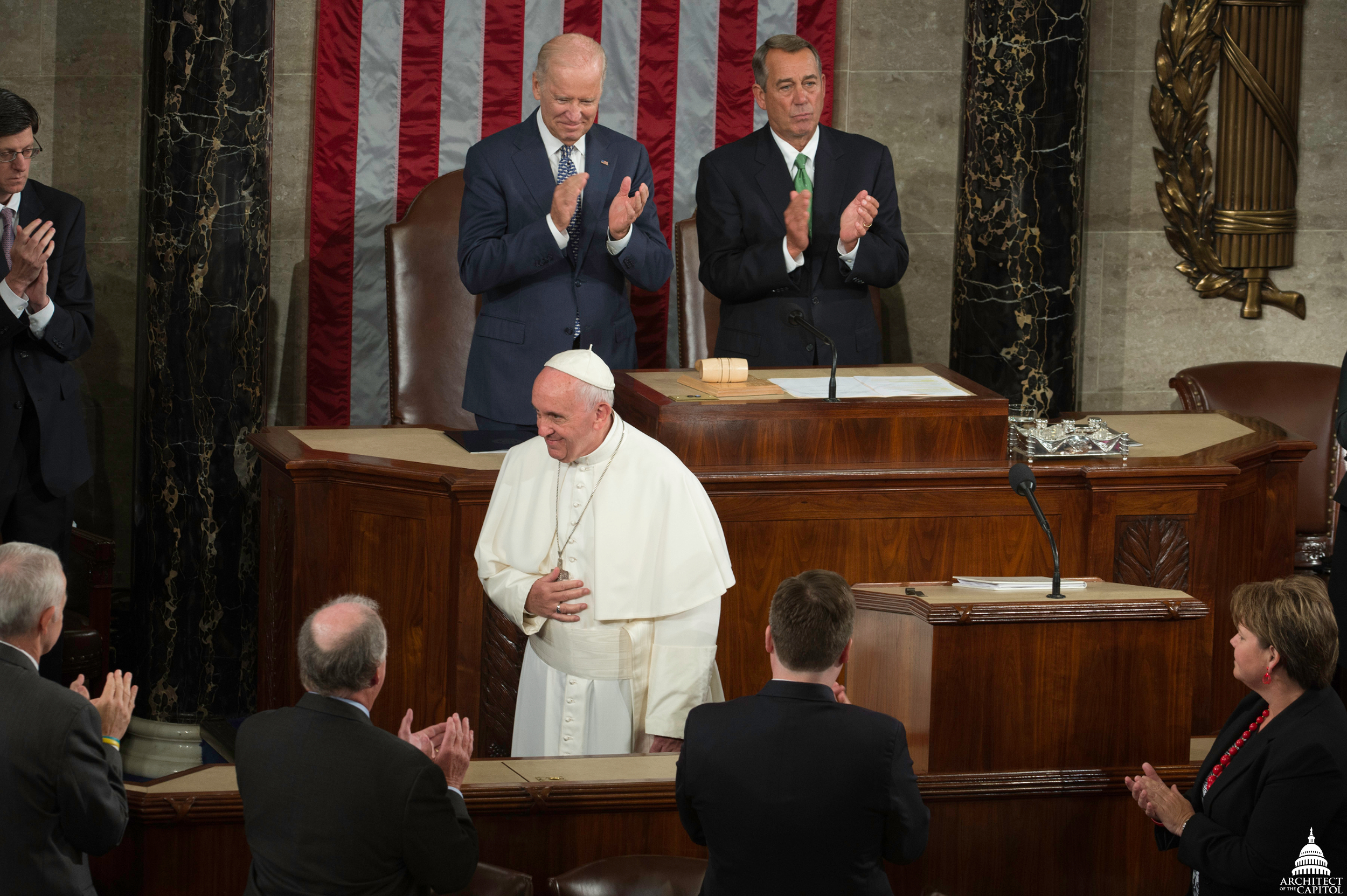
Pope Francis addressed Congress September 24, 2015.

- January 6, 2015: Incumbent Speaker of the House John Boehner was re-elected even though several members of his own party once again chose not to vote for him. He received 216 votes, a majority of the votes cast, but two votes shy of a majority of the full membership.
- January 20, 2015: 2015 State of the Union Address
- March 3, 2015: Prime Minister of Israel Benjamin Netanyahu addressed a joint session of Congress regarding sanctions against Iran. Speaker John Boehner had invited Netanyahu without consulting President Obama.
- March 9, 2015: U.S. Senator Tom Cotton wrote and sent a letter to the leadership of the Islamic Republic of Iran, signed by 47 of the Senate's 54 Republicans, attempting to cast doubt on the Obama administration's authority to engage in nuclear-proliferation negotiations with Iran.
- March 25, 2015: President of Afghanistan Ashraf Ghani addressed a joint session of Congress.
- April 29, 2015: Prime Minister of Japan Shinzō Abe addressed a joint session of Congress, becoming the first Japanese leader to do so.
- September 24, 2015: Pope Francis addressed a joint session of Congress, becoming the first Pope to do so.
- September 25, 2015: John Boehner announced that he would resign from Congress at the end of October 2015. Subsequently, Majority Leader Kevin McCarthy, the presumptive favorite to succeed John Boehner as Speaker of the House, unexpectedly withdrew his candidacy for the office.
- October 29, 2015: Paul Ryan was elected to succeed John Boehner as Speaker of the House receiving 236 votes (of 432 votes cast), becoming the youngest Speaker since James G. Blaine in 1869.
- January 12, 2016: 2016 State of the Union Address
- June 8, 2016: Indian Prime Minister Narendra Modi addressed a joint session of Congress.
- June 10, 2016: The murder of Christina Grimmie occurs in Orlando, which prompts debates on Universal background checks.
- June 22–23, 2016: In the wake of the Orlando nightclub shooting, Congress debated gun control reform. The U.S. House recessed for the July 4 holiday during a sit-in protest held by Democrats that halted business in the chamber for more than 24 hours.
- November 8, 2016: Donald Trump and Mike Pence elected as president and vice-president in presidential elections, while the Republicans retain majority at both Senate and House of Representatives.

== Major legislation ==
=== Enacted ===
- January 12, 2015: Terrorism Risk Insurance Program Reauthorization Act of 2015, Pub. L. 114–1 (text) (PDF)
- February 27, 2015: Protecting Volunteer Firefighters and Emergency Responders Act, Pub.L. 114-3
- March 4, 2015: Department of Homeland Security Appropriations Act, 2015, Pub.L. 114-4
- April 16, 2015: Medicare Access and CHIP Reauthorization Act of 2015, Pub. L. 114–10 (text) (PDF)
- May 22, 2015: Iran Nuclear Agreement Review Act of 2015, Pub. L. 114–17 (text) (PDF)
- May 29, 2015: Justice for Victims of Trafficking Act of 2015, Pub. L. 114–22 (text) (PDF)
- June 2, 2015: USA FREEDOM Act: Uniting and Strengthening America by Fulfilling Rights and Ensuring Effective Discipline Over Monitoring Act of 2015, Pub. L. 114–23 (text) (PDF)
- June 29, 2015: Trade Preferences Extension Act of 2015, Pub. L. 114–27 (text) (PDF)
- July 6, 2015: Department of Homeland Security Interoperable Communications Act, Pub. L. 114–29 (text) (PDF)
- September 25, 2015: Gerardo Hernandez Airport Security Act of 2015, Pub.L. 114-50
- September 30, 2015: National Winstorm Impact Reduction Act Reauthorization of 2015, Pub.L. 114-52
- November 2, 2015: Bipartisan Budget Act of 2015, Pub. L. 114–74 (text) (PDF)
- November 5, 2015: Librarian of Congress Succession Modernization Act of 2015, Pub. L. 114–86 (text) (PDF)
- November 25, 2015: SPACE Act of 2015, Pub. L. 114–90 (text) (PDF)
- November 25, 2015: National Defense Authorization Act for Fiscal Year 2016, Pub.L. 114-92
- December 4, 2015: Fixing America's Surface Transportation (FAST) Act, Pub. L. 114–94 (text) (PDF)
- December 10, 2015: Every Student Succeeds Act, Pub. L. 114–95 (text) (PDF)
- December 18, 2015: Consolidated Appropriations Act, 2016 (including the Visa Waiver Program Improvement and Terrorist Travel Prevention Act of 2015), Pub. L. 114–113 (text) (PDF)
- December 28, 2015: Microbead-Free Waters Act of 2015, Pub. L. 114–114 (text) (PDF)
- January 28, 2016: Grants Oversight and New Efficiency (GONE) Act, Pub.L. 114-117
- February 8, 2016: International Megan's Law to Prevent Sexual Exploitation and Other Crimes Through Advanced Notification of Traveling Sex Offenders, Pub.L. 114-119
- February 8, 2016: Coast Guard Authorization Act of 2015, Pub. L. 114–120 (text) (PDF)
- February 24, 2016: Internet Tax Freedom Act contained in Trade Facilitation and Trade Enforcement Act of 2015, Pub. L. 114–125 (text) (PDF)
- May 9, 2016: Protect and Preserve International Cultural Property Act, Pub.L. 114-151
- June 28, 2016: Frank R. Lautenberg Chemical Safety for the 21st Century Act, Pub. L. 114-182
- June 30, 2016: Puerto Rico Oversight, Management, and Economic Stability Act (PROMESA), Pub.L. 114-187
- July 20, 2016: Global Food Security Act of 2016, Pub. L. 114–195 (text) (PDF)
- July 29, 2016: Making Electronic Government Accountable By Yielding Tangible Efficiences (MEGABYTE) Act of 2016, Pub.L. 114-210
- September 28, 2016: Justice Against Sponsors of Terrorism Act, Pub. L. 114–222 (text) (PDF)
- September 29, 2016: Continuing Appropriations and Military Construction, Veterans Affairs, and Related Agencies Appropriations Act, 2017, and Zika Response and Preparedness Act, Pub.L. 114-223
- October 7, 2016: Sexual Assault Survivors' Rights Act, Pub. L. 114–236 (text) (PDF)
- December 10, 2016: Further Continuing and Security Assistance Appropriations Act, 2017, Pub.L. 114-254
- December 13, 2016: 21st Century Cures Act, Pub. L. 114–255 (text) (PDF)
- December 14, 2016: First Responder Anthrax Preparedness Act, Pub.L. 114-268
- December 14, 2016: Better Online Ticket Sales (BOTS) Act, Pub.L. 114-274
- December 16, 2016: Frank R. Wolf International Religious Freedom Act, Pub. L. 114-281
- December 16, 2016: United States-Israel Advanced Research Partnership Act of 2016, Pub.L. 114-304
- December 16, 2016: Holocaust Expropriated Art Recovery (HEAR) Act of 2016, Pub.L. 114-308
- December 16, 2016: Foreign Cultural Exchange Jurisdictional Immunity Clarification Act, Pub.L. 114-319
- December 23, 2016: National Defense Authorization Act for Fiscal Year 2017, Pub.L. 114-328
- January 6, 2017: American Innovation and Competitiveness Act, Pub.L. 114-329

=== Vetoed ===
- February 24, 2015: Keystone XL Pipeline Approval Act (S. 1)
- March 31, 2015: A joint resolution providing for congressional disapproval under chapter 8 of title 5, United States Code, of the rule submitted by the National Labor Relations Board relating to representation case procedures. (S.J.Res. 8)
- October 22, 2015: National Defense Authorization Act for Fiscal Year 2016 (H.R. 1735)
- December 19, 2015: A joint resolution providing for congressional disapproval under chapter 8 of title 5, United States Code, of a rule submitted by the Environmental Protection Agency relating to "Standards of Performance for Greenhouse Gas Emissions from New, Modified, and Reconstructed Stationary Sources: Electric Utility Generating Units" (S.J.Res. 23)
- December 19, 2015: A joint resolution providing for congressional disapproval under chapter 8 of title 5, United States Code, of a rule submitted by the Environmental Protection Agency relating to "Carbon Pollution Emission Guidelines for Existing Stationary Sources: Electric Utility Generating Units" (S.J.Res. 24)
- January 8, 2016: The Restoring Americans' Healthcare Freedom Reconciliation Act of 2015 (H.R. 3762)
- January 19, 2016: A joint resolution providing for congressional disapproval under chapter 8 of title 5, United States Code, of the rule submitted by the Corps of Engineers and the Environmental Protection Agency relating to the definition of "waters of the United States" under the Federal Water Pollution Control Act (S.J.Res. 22)
- June 8, 2016: A joint resolution disapproving the rule submitted by the Department of Labor relating to the definition of the term "Fiduciary" (H.J.Res. 88)
- July 22, 2016: Presidential Allowance Modernization Act of 2016 (H.R. 1777)
- September 23, 2016: Justice Against Sponsors of Terrorism Act (S. 2040) (Passed over Veto)

== Party summary ==
Resignations and new members are discussed in the "Changes in membership" section, below.

=== Senate ===
Final Senate membership 44 Democrats 54 Republicans 2 Independents, caucusing with Democrats

Affiliation	Party (Shading indicates majority caucus)			Total	Vacant
Affiliation	Democratic	Independent (caucusing with Democrats)	Republican	Total	Vacant
End of previous Congress	53	2	45	100	0
Begin (January 3, 2015)	44	2	54	100	0
Final voting share	46.0%		54.0%		
Beginning of the next Congress	46	2	52	100	0

=== House of Representatives ===
Final House membership 187 Democrats 246 Republicans 2 Vacant

	Party (Shading indicates majority caucus)			Total	Vacant
	Democratic	Independent	Republican	Total	Vacant
End of previous Congress	201	0	234	435	0
Begin (January 3, 2015)	188	0	247	435	0
January 5, 2015 (Note: In New York's 11th district: Michael Grimm (R) resigned January 5, 2015, and Dan Donovan (R) was elected May 5, 2015.)	188	0	246	434	1
February 6, 2015 (Note: In Mississippi's 1st district: Alan Nunnelee (R) died February 6, 2015, and Trent Kelly (R) was elected June 2, 2015.)	188	0	245	433	2
March 31, 2015 (Note: In Illinois's 18th district: Aaron Schock (R) resigned March 31, 2015, and Darin Lahood (R) was elected September 10, 2015.)	188	0	244	432	3
May 5, 2015	188	0	245	433	2
June 2, 2015	188	0	246	434	1
September 10, 2015	188	0	247	435	0
October 31, 2015 (Note: In Ohio's 8th district: John Boehner (R) resigned October 31, 2015, and Warren Davidson (R-) was elected June 7, 2016.)	188	0	246	434	1
June 7, 2016	188	0	247	435	0
June 23, 2016 (Note: In Pennsylvania's 2nd district: Chaka Fattah (D) resigned June 23, 2016, and Dwight Evans (D) was elected November 8, 2016.)	187	0	247	434	1
July 20, 2016 (Note: In Hawaii's 1st district: Mark Takai (D) died July 20, 2016, and Colleen Hanabusa (D) was elected November 8, 2016.)	186	0	247	433	2
September 6, 2016 (Note: In Kentucky's 1st district: Ed Whitfield (R) resigned September 6, 2016, and James Comer (R) was elected November 8, 2016.)	186	0	246	432	3
November 8, 2016	188	0	247	435	0
December 4, 2016 (Note: In California's 44th district: Janice Hahn (D) resigned December 4, 2016.)	187	0	247	434	1
December 31, 2016 (Note: In Michigan's 10th district: Candice Miller (R) resigned December 31, 2016.)	187	0	246	433	2
Final voting share	43.2%	0.0%	56.8%		
Non-voting members	4	1	1	6	0
Beginning of the next Congress	194	0	241	435	0

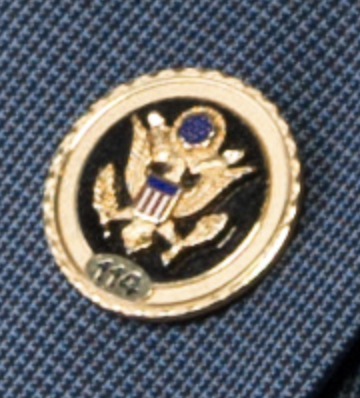
114th U.S. Congress House of Representatives Member Pin

== Leadership ==
Section contents: Senate: Majority (R), Minority (D) • House: Majority (R), Minority (D)

=== Senate ===
Senate President

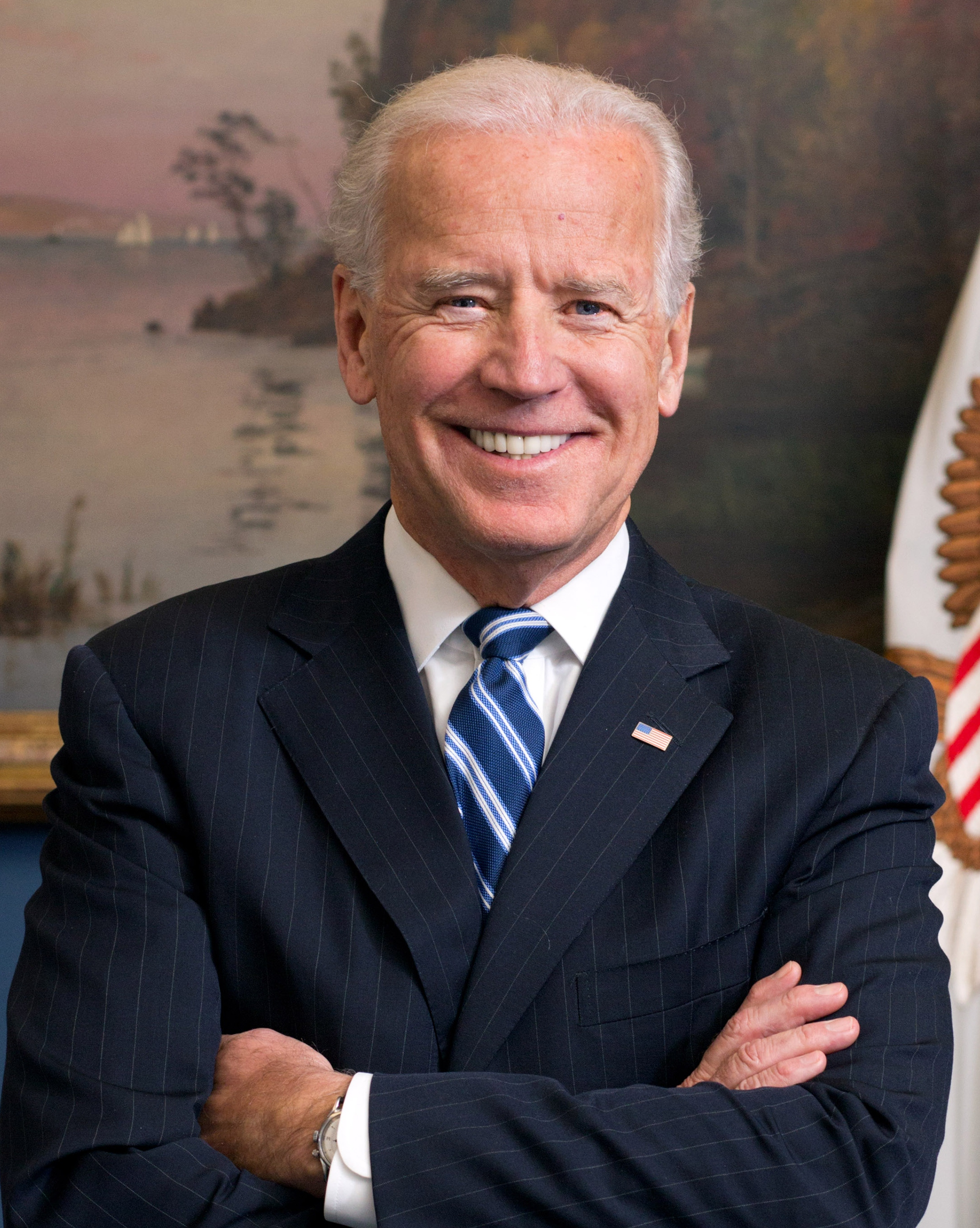
Joe Biden (D)

Senate President pro tempore

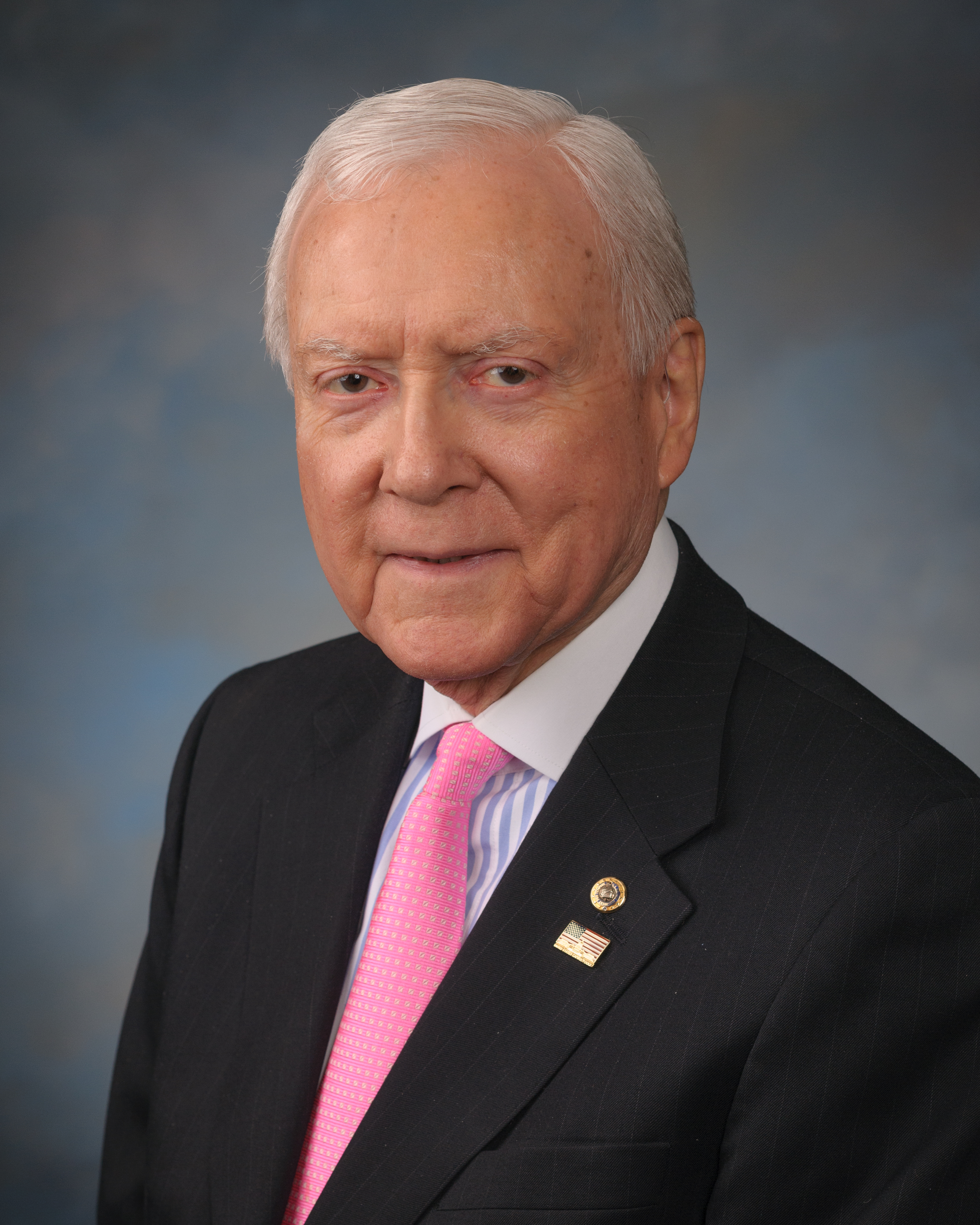
Orrin Hatch (R)

- President: Joe Biden (D)
- President pro tempore: Orrin Hatch (R)

==== Majority (Republican) leadership ====
- Majority Leader: Mitch McConnell
- Assistant Majority Leader (Majority Whip): John Cornyn
- Chief Deputy Whip: Mike Crapo
- Deputy Whips: [data missing]
- Republican Conference Chairman: John Thune
- Republican Conference Vice Chairman: Roy Blunt
- Senatorial Committee Chairman: Roger Wicker
- Policy Committee Chairman: John Barrasso

==== Minority (Democratic) leadership ====
- Minority Leader: Harry Reid
- Assistant Minority Leader (Minority Whip): Dick Durbin
- Chief Deputy Whip: Barbara Boxer
- Deputy Whips: [data missing]
- Democratic Caucus Chairman: Harry Reid
- Democratic Caucus Vice Chair and Policy Committee Chairman: Chuck Schumer
- Democratic Caucus Secretary: Patty Murray
- Senatorial Campaign Committee Chairman: Jon Tester
- Policy Committee Vice Chairwoman: Debbie Stabenow
- Policy Committee Strategic Policy Adviser: Elizabeth Warren
- Policy Committee Policy Development Adviser: Mark Warner
- Steering and Outreach Committee Chairwoman: Amy Klobuchar
- Steering and Outreach Committee Vice Chairwoman: Jeanne Shaheen

=== House of Representatives ===
House Speaker

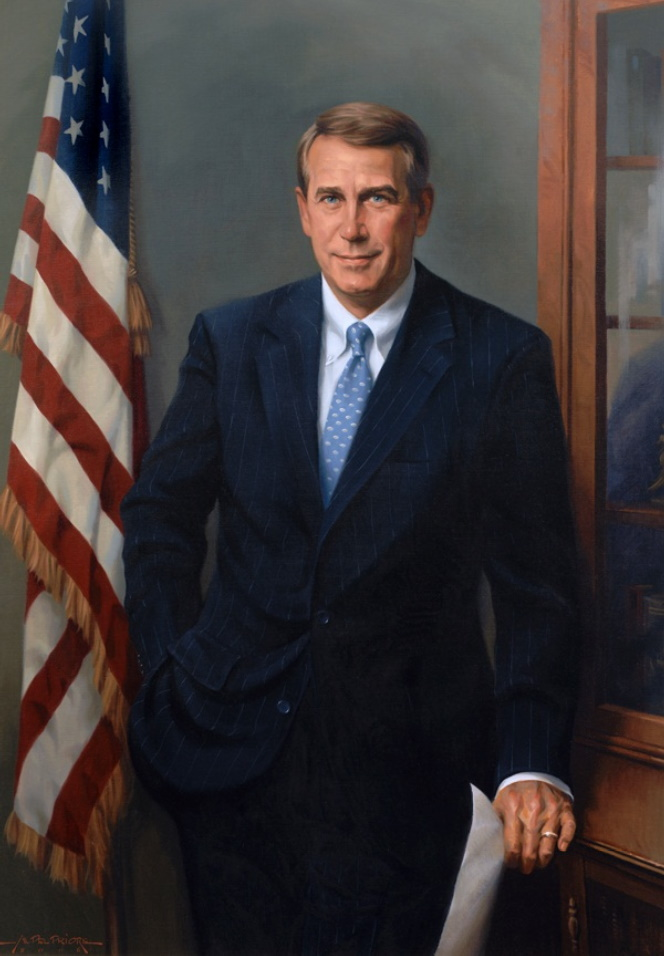
John Boehner (R), until October 29, 2015

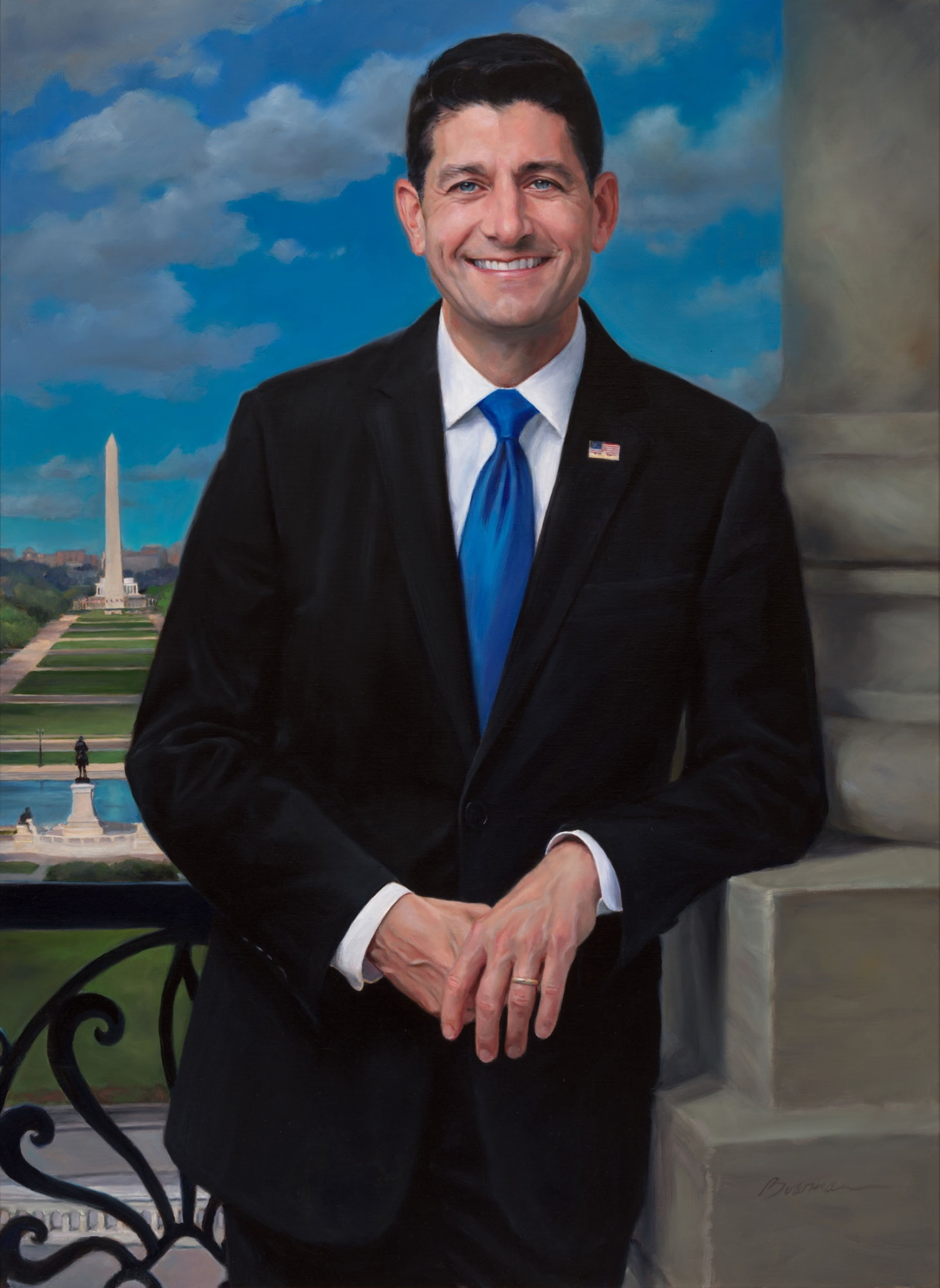
Paul Ryan (R), from October 29, 2015

- Speaker: John Boehner (R), until October 29, 2015
  - Paul Ryan (R), from October 29, 2015

==== Majority (Republican) leadership ====
- Majority Leader: Kevin McCarthy
- Majority Whip: Steve Scalise
- Majority Chief Deputy Whip: Patrick McHenry
- Senior Deputy Whips: Kristi Noem, Dennis Ross, Aaron Schock (until March 31, 2015), Steve Stivers, Ann Wagner
- Republican Conference Chairwoman: Cathy McMorris Rodgers
- Republican Conference Vice-Chairwoman: Lynn Jenkins
- Republican Conference Secretary: Virginia Foxx
- Republican Campaign Committee Chairman: Greg Walden
- Policy Committee Chairman: Luke Messer
- Republican Campaign Committee Deputy Chairman: Lynn Westmoreland

==== Minority (Democratic) leadership ====
- Minority Leader: Nancy Pelosi
- Minority Whip: Steny Hoyer
- Assistant Democratic Leader: Jim Clyburn
- Senior Chief Deputy Minority Whip: John Lewis
- Chief Deputy Minority Whips: G. K. Butterfield, Diana DeGette, Keith Ellison, Jan Schakowsky, Kyrsten Sinema, Debbie Wasserman Schultz, Peter Welch
- Democratic Caucus Chairman: Xavier Becerra
- Democratic Caucus Vice-Chairman: Joe Crowley
- Democratic Campaign Committee Chairman: Ben Ray Luján
- Steering and Policy Committee Co-Chairs: Rosa DeLauro (Steering) and Donna Edwards (Policy)
- Organization, Study, and Review Chairwoman: Karen Bass
- Policy and Communications Chairman: Steve Israel

== Members ==
=== Senate ===
Senators are listed by state and then by Senate classes, In this Congress, Class 3 meant their term ended with this Congress, requiring re-election in 2016; Class 1 meant their term began in the last Congress, requiring re-election in 2018; and Class 2 meant their term began in this Congress, requiring re-election in 2020.

==== Alabama ====
▌2. Jeff Sessions (R)
▌3. Richard Shelby (R)

==== Alaska ====
▌2. Dan Sullivan (R)
▌3. Lisa Murkowski (R)

==== Arizona ====
▌1. Jeff Flake (R)
▌3. John McCain (R)

==== Arkansas ====
▌2. Tom Cotton (R)
▌3. John Boozman (R)

==== California ====
▌1. Dianne Feinstein (D)
▌3. Barbara Boxer (D)

==== Colorado ====
▌2. Cory Gardner (R)
▌3. Michael Bennet (D)

==== Connecticut ====
▌1. Chris Murphy (D)
▌3. Richard Blumenthal (D)

==== Delaware ====
▌1. Tom Carper (D)
▌2. Chris Coons (D)

==== Florida ====
▌1. Bill Nelson (D)
▌3. Marco Rubio (R)

==== Georgia ====
▌2. David Perdue (R)
▌3. Johnny Isakson (R)

==== Hawaii ====
▌1. Mazie Hirono (D)
▌3. Brian Schatz (D)

==== Idaho ====
▌2. Jim Risch (R)
▌3. Mike Crapo (R)

==== Illinois ====
▌2. Dick Durbin (D)
▌3. Mark Kirk (R)

==== Indiana ====
▌1. Joe Donnelly (D)
▌3. Dan Coats (R)

==== Iowa ====
▌2. Joni Ernst (R)
▌3. Chuck Grassley (R)

==== Kansas ====
▌2. Pat Roberts (R)
▌3. Jerry Moran (R)

==== Kentucky ====
▌2. Mitch McConnell (R)
▌3. Rand Paul (R)

==== Louisiana ====
▌2. Bill Cassidy (R)
▌3. David Vitter (R)

==== Maine ====
▌1. Angus King (I) (Note: Senators King (ME) and Sanders (VT) had no political affiliation but caucused with the Democratic Party.)
▌2. Susan Collins (R)

==== Maryland ====
▌1. Ben Cardin (D)
▌3. Barbara Mikulski (D)

==== Massachusetts ====
▌1. Elizabeth Warren (D)
▌2. Ed Markey (D)

==== Michigan ====
▌1. Debbie Stabenow (D)
▌2. Gary Peters (D)

==== Minnesota ====
▌1. Amy Klobuchar (DFL) (Note: The Minnesota Democratic–Farmer–Labor Party (DFL) and the North Dakota Democratic-Nonpartisan League Party (D-NPL) are the Minnesota and North Dakota affiliates of the U.S. Democratic Party and are counted as Democrats.)
▌2. Al Franken (DFL)

==== Mississippi ====
▌1. Roger Wicker (R)
▌2. Thad Cochran (R)

==== Missouri ====
▌1. Claire McCaskill (D)
▌3. Roy Blunt (R)

==== Montana ====
▌1. Jon Tester (D)
▌2. Steve Daines (R)

==== Nebraska ====
▌1. Deb Fischer (R)
▌2. Ben Sasse (R)

==== Nevada ====
▌1. Dean Heller (R)
▌3. Harry Reid (D)

==== New Hampshire ====
▌2. Jeanne Shaheen (D)
▌3. Kelly Ayotte (R)

==== New Jersey ====
▌1. Bob Menendez (D)
▌2. Cory Booker (D)

==== New Mexico ====
▌1. Martin Heinrich (D)
▌2. Tom Udall (D)

==== New York ====
▌1. Kirsten Gillibrand (D)
▌3. Chuck Schumer (D)

==== North Carolina ====
▌2. Thom Tillis (R)
▌3. Richard Burr (R)

==== North Dakota ====
▌1. Heidi Heitkamp (D-NPL)
▌3. John Hoeven (R)

==== Ohio ====
▌1. Sherrod Brown (D)
▌3. Rob Portman (R)

==== Oklahoma ====
▌2. Jim Inhofe (R)
▌3. James Lankford (R)

==== Oregon ====
▌2. Jeff Merkley (D)
▌3. Ron Wyden (D)

==== Pennsylvania ====
▌1. Bob Casey Jr. (D)
▌3. Pat Toomey (R)

==== Rhode Island ====
▌1. Sheldon Whitehouse (D)
▌2. Jack Reed (D)

==== South Carolina ====
▌2. Lindsey Graham (R)
▌3. Tim Scott (R)

==== South Dakota ====
▌2. Mike Rounds (R)
▌3. John Thune (R)

==== Tennessee ====
▌1. Bob Corker (R)
▌2. Lamar Alexander (R)

==== Texas ====
▌1. Ted Cruz (R)
▌2. John Cornyn (R)

==== Utah ====
▌1. Orrin Hatch (R)
▌3. Mike Lee (R)

==== Vermont ====
▌1. Bernie Sanders (I)
▌3. Patrick Leahy (D)

==== Virginia ====
▌1. Tim Kaine (D)
▌2. Mark Warner (D)

==== Washington ====
▌1. Maria Cantwell (D)
▌3. Patty Murray (D)

==== West Virginia ====
▌1. Joe Manchin (D)
▌2. Shelley Moore Capito (R)

==== Wisconsin ====
▌1. Tammy Baldwin (D)
▌3. Ron Johnson (R)

==== Wyoming ====
▌1. John Barrasso (R)
▌2. Mike Enzi (R)

Party membership of the Senate, by state 2 Democrats 2 Republicans 1 Democrat and 1 Republican 1 Independent and 1 Democrat 1 Independent and 1 Republican

Senate majority leadership

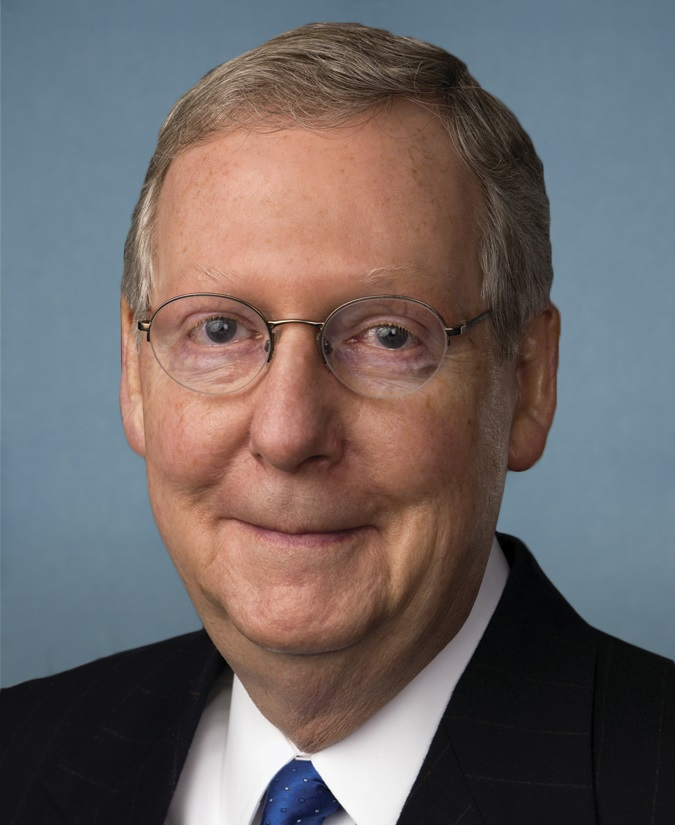
Republican leader
Mitch McConnell

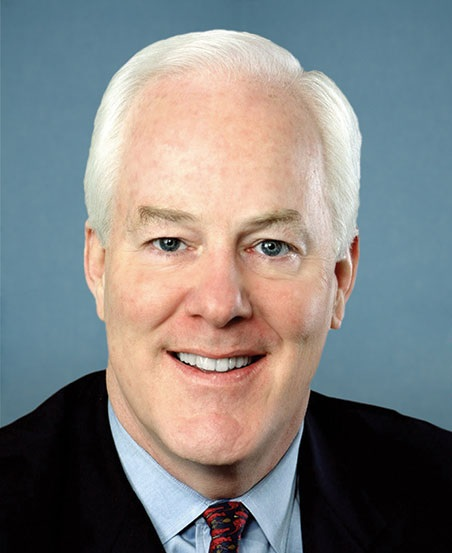
Republican whip
John Cornyn

Senate minority leadership

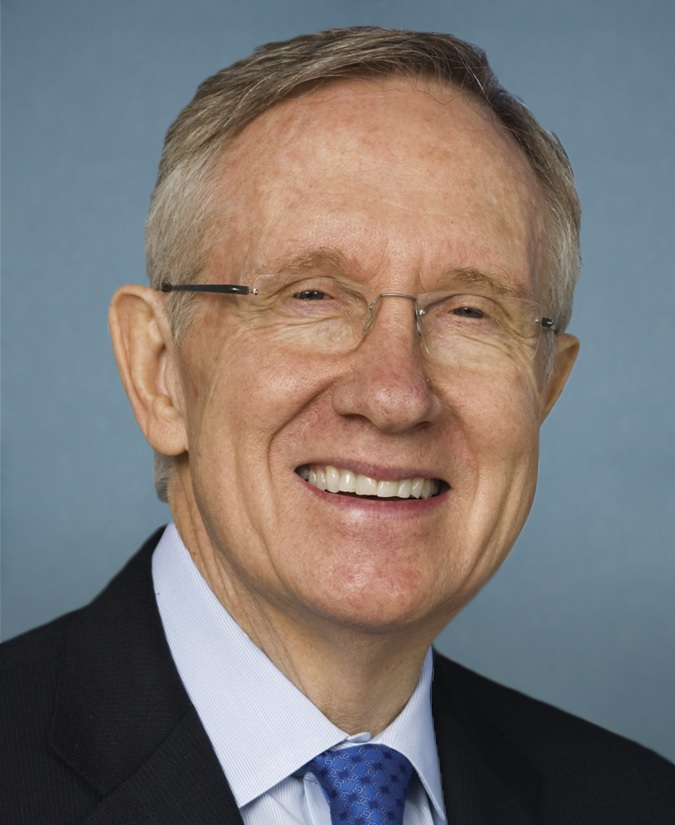
Democratic leader
Harry Reid

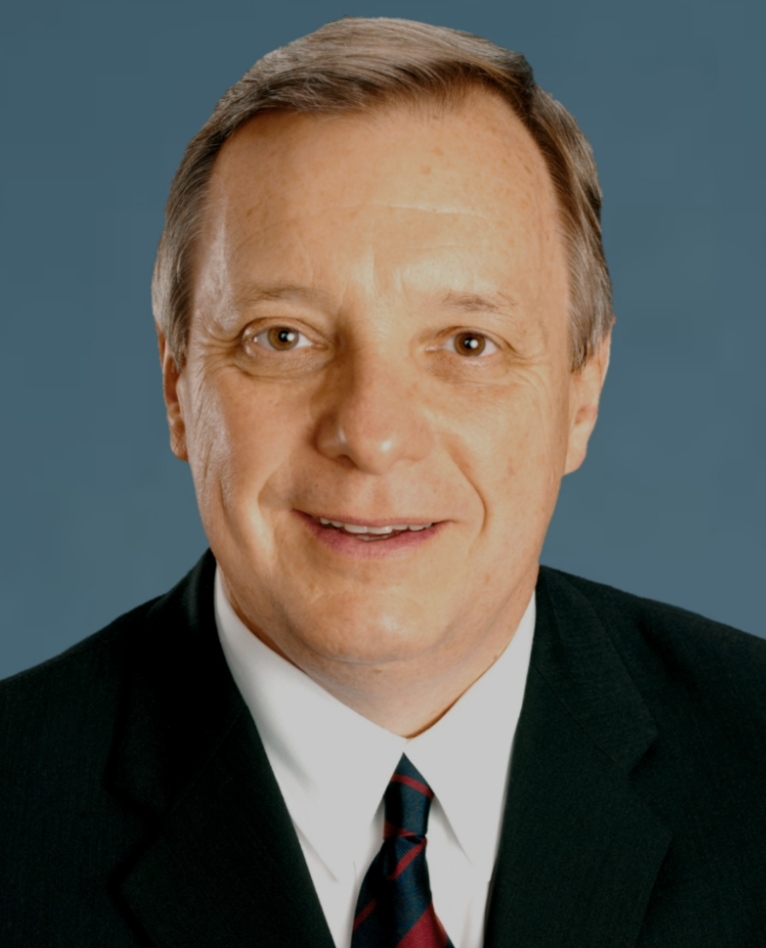
Democratic whip
Dick Durbin

=== House of Representatives ===
==== Alabama ====
▌1. Bradley Byrne (R)
▌2. Martha Roby (R)
▌3. Mike Rogers (R)
▌4. Robert Aderholt (R)
▌5. Mo Brooks (R)
▌6. Gary Palmer (R)
▌7. Terri Sewell (D)

==== Alaska ====
▌At-large. Don Young (R)

==== Arizona ====
▌1. Ann Kirkpatrick (D)
▌2. Martha McSally (R)
▌3. Raúl Grijalva (D)
▌4. Paul Gosar (R)
▌5. Matt Salmon (R)
▌6. David Schweikert (R)
▌7. Ruben Gallego (D)
▌8. Trent Franks (R)
▌9. Kyrsten Sinema (D)

==== Arkansas ====
▌1. Rick Crawford (R)
▌2. French Hill (R)
▌3. Steve Womack (R)
▌4. Bruce Westerman (R)

==== California ====
▌1. Doug LaMalfa (R)
▌2. Jared Huffman (D)
▌3. John Garamendi (D)
▌4. Tom McClintock (R)
▌5. Mike Thompson (D)
▌6. Doris Matsui (D)
▌7. Ami Bera (D)
▌8. Paul Cook (R)
▌9. Jerry McNerney (D)
▌10. Jeff Denham (R)
▌11. Mark DeSaulnier (D)
▌12. Nancy Pelosi (D)
▌13. Barbara Lee (D)
▌14. Jackie Speier (D)
▌15. Eric Swalwell (D)
▌16. Jim Costa (D)
▌17. Mike Honda (D)
▌18. Anna Eshoo (D)
▌19. Zoe Lofgren (D)
▌20. Sam Farr (D)
▌21. David Valadao (R)
▌22. Devin Nunes (R)
▌23. Kevin McCarthy (R)
▌24. Lois Capps (D)
▌25. Steve Knight (R)
▌26. Julia Brownley (D)
▌27. Judy Chu (D)
▌28. Adam Schiff (D)
▌29. Tony Cardenas (D)
▌30. Brad Sherman (D)
▌31. Pete Aguilar (D)
▌32. Grace Napolitano (D)
▌33. Ted Lieu (D)
▌34. Xavier Becerra (D)
▌35. Norma Torres (D)
▌36. Raul Ruiz (D)
▌37. Karen Bass (D)
▌38. Linda Sánchez (D)
▌39. Ed Royce (R)
▌40. Lucille Roybal-Allard (D)
▌41. Mark Takano (D)
▌42. Ken Calvert (R)
▌43. Maxine Waters (D)
▌44. Janice Hahn (D), until December 4, 2016

Vacant

▌45. Mimi Walters (R)
▌46. Loretta Sanchez (D)
▌47. Alan Lowenthal (D)
▌48. Dana Rohrabacher (R)
▌49. Darrell Issa (R)
▌50. Duncan D. Hunter (R)
▌51. Juan Vargas (D)
▌52. Scott Peters (D)
▌53. Susan Davis (D)

==== Colorado ====
▌1. Diana DeGette (D)
▌2. Jared Polis (D)
▌3. Scott Tipton (R)
▌4. Ken Buck (R)
▌5. Doug Lamborn (R)
▌6. Mike Coffman (R)
▌7. Ed Perlmutter (D)

==== Connecticut ====
▌1. John Larson (D)
▌2. Joe Courtney (D)
▌3. Rosa DeLauro (D)
▌4. Jim Himes (D)
▌5. Elizabeth Esty (D)

==== Delaware ====
▌At-large. John Carney (D)

==== Florida ====
▌1. Jeff Miller (R)
▌2. Gwen Graham (D)
▌3. Ted Yoho (R)
▌4. Ander Crenshaw (R)
▌5. Corrine Brown (D)
▌6. Ron DeSantis (R)
▌7. John Mica (R)
▌8. Bill Posey (R)
▌9. Alan Grayson (D)
▌10. Daniel Webster (R)
▌11. Rich Nugent (R)
▌12. Gus Bilirakis (R)
▌13. David Jolly (R)
▌14. Kathy Castor (D)
▌15. Dennis Ross (R)
▌16. Vern Buchanan (R)
▌17. Tom Rooney (R)
▌18. Patrick Murphy (D)
▌19. Curt Clawson (R)
▌20. Alcee Hastings (D)
▌21. Ted Deutch (D)
▌22. Lois Frankel (D)
▌23. Debbie Wasserman Schultz (D)
▌24. Frederica Wilson (D)
▌25. Mario Díaz-Balart (R)
▌26. Carlos Curbelo (R)
▌27. Ileana Ros-Lehtinen (R)

==== Georgia ====
▌1. Buddy Carter (R)
▌2. Sanford Bishop (D)
▌3. Lynn Westmoreland (R)
▌4. Hank Johnson (D)
▌5. John Lewis (D)
▌6. Tom Price (R)
▌7. Rob Woodall (R)
▌8. Austin Scott (R)
▌9. Doug Collins (R)
▌10. Jody Hice (R)
▌11. Barry Loudermilk (R)
▌12. Rick Allen (R)
▌13. David Scott (D)
▌14. Tom Graves (R)

==== Hawaii ====
▌1. Mark Takai (D), until July 20, 2016

▌Colleen Hanabusa (D), from November 8, 2016

▌2. Tulsi Gabbard (D)

==== Idaho ====
▌1. Raul Labrador (R)
▌2. Mike Simpson (R)

==== Illinois ====
▌1. Bobby Rush (D)
▌2. Robin Kelly (D)
▌3. Dan Lipinski (D)
▌4. Luis Gutiérrez (D)
▌5. Mike Quigley (D)
▌6. Peter Roskam (R)
▌7. Danny Davis (D)
▌8. Tammy Duckworth (D)
▌9. Jan Schakowsky (D)
▌10. Bob Dold (R)
▌11. Bill Foster (D)
▌12. Mike Bost (R)
▌13. Rodney Davis (R)
▌14. Randy Hultgren (R)
▌15. John Shimkus (R)
▌16. Adam Kinzinger (R)
▌17. Cheri Bustos (D)
▌18. Aaron Schock (R), until March 31, 2015

▌Darin LaHood (R), from September 10, 2015

==== Indiana ====
▌1. Pete Visclosky (D)
▌2. Jackie Walorski (R)
▌3. Marlin Stutzman (R)
▌4. Todd Rokita (R)
▌5. Susan Brooks (R)
▌6. Luke Messer (R)
▌7. André Carson (D)
▌8. Larry Bucshon (R)
▌9. Todd Young (R)

==== Iowa ====
▌1. Rod Blum (R)
▌2. David Loebsack (D)
▌3. David Young (R)
▌4. Steve King (R)

==== Kansas ====
▌1. Tim Huelskamp (R)
▌2. Lynn Jenkins (R)
▌3. Kevin Yoder (R)
▌4. Mike Pompeo (R)

==== Kentucky ====
▌1. Ed Whitfield (R), until September 6, 2016

▌James Comer (R), from November 8, 2016

▌2. Brett Guthrie (R)
▌3. John Yarmuth (D)
▌4. Thomas Massie (R)
▌5. Hal Rogers (R)
▌6. Andy Barr (R)

==== Louisiana ====
▌1. Steve Scalise (R)
▌2. Cedric Richmond (D)
▌3. Charles Boustany (R)
▌4. John Fleming (R)
▌5. Ralph Abraham (R)
▌6. Garret Graves (R)

==== Maine ====
▌1. Chellie Pingree (D)
▌2. Bruce Poliquin (R)

==== Maryland ====
▌1. Andy Harris (R)
▌2. Dutch Ruppersberger (D)
▌3. John Sarbanes (D)
▌4. Donna Edwards (D)
▌5. Steny Hoyer (D)
▌6. John Delaney (D)
▌7. Elijah Cummings (D)
▌8. Chris Van Hollen (D)

==== Massachusetts ====
▌1. Richard Neal (D)
▌2. Jim McGovern (D)
▌3. Niki Tsongas (D)
▌4. Joe Kennedy (D)
▌5. Katherine Clark (D)
▌6. Seth Moulton (D)
▌7. Mike Capuano (D)
▌8. Stephen Lynch (D)
▌9. Bill Keating (D)

==== Michigan ====
▌1. Dan Benishek (R)
▌2. Bill Huizenga (R)
▌3. Justin Amash (R)
▌4. John Moolenaar (R)
▌5. Dan Kildee (D)
▌6. Fred Upton (R)
▌7. Tim Walberg (R)
▌8. Mike Bishop (R)
▌9. Sander Levin (D)
▌10. Candice Miller (R), until December 31, 2016

Vacant

▌11. Dave Trott (R)
▌12. Debbie Dingell (D)
▌13. John Conyers (D)
▌14. Brenda Lawrence (D)

==== Minnesota ====
▌1. Tim Walz (DFL)
▌2. John Kline (R)
▌3. Erik Paulsen (R)
▌4. Betty McCollum (DFL)
▌5. Keith Ellison (DFL)
▌6. Tom Emmer (R)
▌7. Collin Peterson (DFL)
▌8. Rick Nolan (DFL)

==== Mississippi ====
▌1. Alan Nunnelee (R), until February 6, 2015

▌Trent Kelly (R), from June 2, 2015

▌2. Bennie Thompson (D)
▌3. Gregg Harper (R)
▌4. Steven Palazzo (R)

==== Missouri ====
▌1. Lacy Clay (D)
▌2. Ann Wagner (R)
▌3. Blaine Luetkemeyer (R)
▌4. Vicky Hartzler (R)
▌5. Emanuel Cleaver (D)
▌6. Sam Graves (R)
▌7. Billy Long (R)
▌8. Jason Smith (R)

==== Montana ====
▌At-large. Ryan Zinke (R)

==== Nebraska ====
▌1. Jeff Fortenberry (R)
▌2. Brad Ashford (D)
▌3. Adrian Smith (R)

==== Nevada ====
▌1. Dina Titus (D)
▌2. Mark Amodei (R)
▌3. Joe Heck (R)
▌4. Cresent Hardy (R)

==== New Hampshire ====
▌1. Frank Guinta (R)
▌2. Annie Kuster (D)

==== New Jersey ====
▌1. Donald Norcross (D)
▌2. Frank LoBiondo (R)
▌3. Tom MacArthur (R)
▌4. Chris Smith (R)
▌5. Scott Garrett (R)
▌6. Frank Pallone (D)
▌7. Leonard Lance (R)
▌8. Albio Sires (D)
▌9. Bill Pascrell (D)
▌10. Donald Payne Jr. (D)
▌11. Rodney Frelinghuysen (R)
▌12. Bonnie Watson Coleman (D)

==== New Mexico ====
▌1. Michelle Lujan Grisham (D)
▌2. Steve Pearce (R)
▌3. Ben Ray Luján (D)

==== New York ====
▌1. Lee Zeldin (R)
▌2. Peter King (R)
▌3. Steve Israel (D)
▌4. Kathleen Rice (D)
▌5. Gregory Meeks (D)
▌6. Grace Meng (D)
▌7. Nydia Velázquez (D)
▌8. Hakeem Jeffries (D)
▌9. Yvette Clarke (D)
▌10. Jerrold Nadler (D)
▌11. Dan Donovan (R), from May 5, 2015
▌12. Carolyn Maloney (D)
▌13. Charles Rangel (D)
▌14. Joseph Crowley (D)
▌15. José E. Serrano (D)
▌16. Eliot Engel (D)
▌17. Nita Lowey (D)
▌18. Sean Patrick Maloney (D)
▌19. Chris Gibson (R)
▌20. Paul Tonko (D)
▌21. Elise Stefanik (R)
▌22. Richard Hanna (R)
▌23. Thomas Reed (R)
▌24. John Katko (R)
▌25. Louise Slaughter (D)
▌26. Brian Higgins (D)
▌27. Chris Collins (R)

==== North Carolina ====
▌1. G. K. Butterfield (D)
▌2. Renee Ellmers (R)
▌3. Walter B. Jones Jr. (R)
▌4. David Price (D)
▌5. Virginia Foxx (R)
▌6. Mark Walker (R)
▌7. David Rouzer (R)
▌8. Richard Hudson (R)
▌9. Robert Pittenger (R)
▌10. Patrick McHenry (R)
▌11. Mark Meadows (R)
▌12. Alma Adams (D)
▌13. George Holding (R)

==== North Dakota ====
▌At-large. Kevin Cramer (R)

==== Ohio ====
▌1. Steve Chabot (R)
▌2. Brad Wenstrup (R)
▌3. Joyce Beatty (D)
▌4. Jim Jordan (R)
▌5. Bob Latta (R)
▌6. Bill Johnson (R)
▌7. Bob Gibbs (R)
▌8. John Boehner (R), until October 31, 2015

▌Warren Davidson (R), from June 7, 2016

▌9. Marcy Kaptur (D)
▌10. Mike Turner (R)
▌11. Marcia Fudge (D)
▌12. Pat Tiberi (R)
▌13. Tim Ryan (D)
▌14. David Joyce (R)
▌15. Steve Stivers (R)
▌16. Jim Renacci (R)

==== Oklahoma ====
▌1. Jim Bridenstine (R)
▌2. Markwayne Mullin (R)
▌3. Frank Lucas (R)
▌4. Tom Cole (R)
▌5. Steve Russell (R)

==== Oregon ====
▌1. Suzanne Bonamici (D)
▌2. Greg Walden (R)
▌3. Earl Blumenauer (D)
▌4. Peter DeFazio (D)
▌5. Kurt Schrader (D)

==== Pennsylvania ====
▌1. Bob Brady (D)
▌2. Chaka Fattah (D), until June 23, 2016

▌Dwight Evans (D), from November 8, 2016

▌3. Mike Kelly (R)
▌4. Scott Perry (R)
▌5. Glenn Thompson (R)
▌6. Ryan Costello (R)
▌7. Pat Meehan (R)
▌8. Mike Fitzpatrick (R)
▌9. Bill Shuster (R)
▌10. Tom Marino (R)
▌11. Lou Barletta (R)
▌12. Keith Rothfus (R)
▌13. Brendan Boyle (D)
▌14. Michael Doyle (D)
▌15. Charles Dent (R)
▌16. Joe Pitts (R)
▌17. Matt Cartwright (D)
▌18. Tim Murphy (R)

==== Rhode Island ====
▌1. David Cicilline (D)
▌2. James Langevin (D)

==== South Carolina ====
▌1. Mark Sanford (R)
▌2. Joe Wilson (R)
▌3. Jeff Duncan (R)
▌4. Trey Gowdy (R)
▌5. Mick Mulvaney (R)
▌6. Jim Clyburn (D)
▌7. Tom Rice (R)

==== South Dakota ====
▌At-large. Kristi Noem (R)

==== Tennessee ====
▌1. Phil Roe (R)
▌2. Jimmy Duncan (R)
▌3. Chuck Fleischmann (R)
▌4. Scott DesJarlais (R)
▌5. Jim Cooper (D)
▌6. Diane Black (R)
▌7. Marsha Blackburn (R)
▌8. Stephen Fincher (R)
▌9. Steve Cohen (D)

==== Texas ====
▌1. Louie Gohmert (R)
▌2. Ted Poe (R)
▌3. Sam Johnson (R)
▌4. John Ratcliffe (R)
▌5. Jeb Hensarling (R)
▌6. Joe Barton (R)
▌7. John Culberson (R)
▌8. Kevin Brady (R)
▌9. Al Green (D)
▌10. Michael McCaul (R)
▌11. Mike Conaway (R)
▌12. Kay Granger (R)
▌13. Mac Thornberry (R)
▌14. Randy Weber (R)
▌15. Ruben Hinojosa (D)
▌16. Beto O'Rourke (D)
▌17. Bill Flores (R)
▌18. Sheila Jackson Lee (D)
▌19. Randy Neugebauer (R)
▌20. Joaquin Castro (D)
▌21. Lamar Smith (R)
▌22. Pete Olson (R)
▌23. Will Hurd (R)
▌24. Kenny Marchant (R)
▌25. Roger Williams (R)
▌26. Michael Burgess (R)
▌27. Blake Farenthold (R)
▌28. Henry Cuellar (D)
▌29. Gene Green (D)
▌30. Eddie Bernice Johnson (D)
▌31. John Carter (R)
▌32. Pete Sessions (R)
▌33. Marc Veasey (D)
▌34. Filemon Vela Jr. (D)
▌35. Lloyd Doggett (D)
▌36. Brian Babin (R)

==== Utah ====
▌1. Rob Bishop (R)
▌2. Chris Stewart (R)
▌3. Jason Chaffetz (R)
▌4. Mia Love (R)

==== Vermont ====
▌At-large. Peter Welch (D)

==== Virginia ====
▌1. Rob Wittman (R)
▌2. Scott Rigell (R)
▌3. Bobby Scott (D)
▌4. Randy Forbes (R)
▌5. Robert Hurt (R)
▌6. Bob Goodlatte (R)
▌7. Dave Brat (R)
▌8. Don Beyer (D)
▌9. Morgan Griffith (R)
▌10. Barbara Comstock (R)
▌11. Gerry Connolly (D)

==== Washington ====
▌1. Suzan DelBene (D)
▌2. Rick Larsen (D)
▌3. Jaime Herrera Beutler (R)
▌4. Dan Newhouse (R)
▌5. Cathy McMorris Rodgers (R)
▌6. Derek Kilmer (D)
▌7. Jim McDermott (D)
▌8. Dave Reichert (R)
▌9. Adam Smith (D)
▌10. Dennis Heck (D)

==== West Virginia ====
▌1. David McKinley (R)
▌2. Alex Mooney (R)
▌3. Evan Jenkins (R)

==== Wisconsin ====
▌1. Paul Ryan (R)
▌2. Mark Pocan (D)
▌3. Ron Kind (D)
▌4. Gwen Moore (D)
▌5. Jim Sensenbrenner (R)
▌6. Glenn Grothman (R)
▌7. Sean Duffy (R)
▌8. Reid Ribble (R)

==== Wyoming ====
▌At-large. Cynthia Lummis (R)

==== Non-voting members ====
▌American Samoa. Amata Coleman Radewagen (R)
▌District of Columbia. Eleanor Holmes Norton (D)
▌Guam. Madeleine Bordallo (D)
▌Northern Mariana Islands. Gregorio Sablan (I) (Note: Sablan caucuses with the Democratic Party.)
▌Puerto Rico. Pedro Pierluisi (Resident Commissioner) (D/PNP) (Note: Like many members of the PNP, Pedro Pierluisi affiliates with both the PNP and the Democratic Party.)
▌United States Virgin Islands. Stacey Plaskett (D)

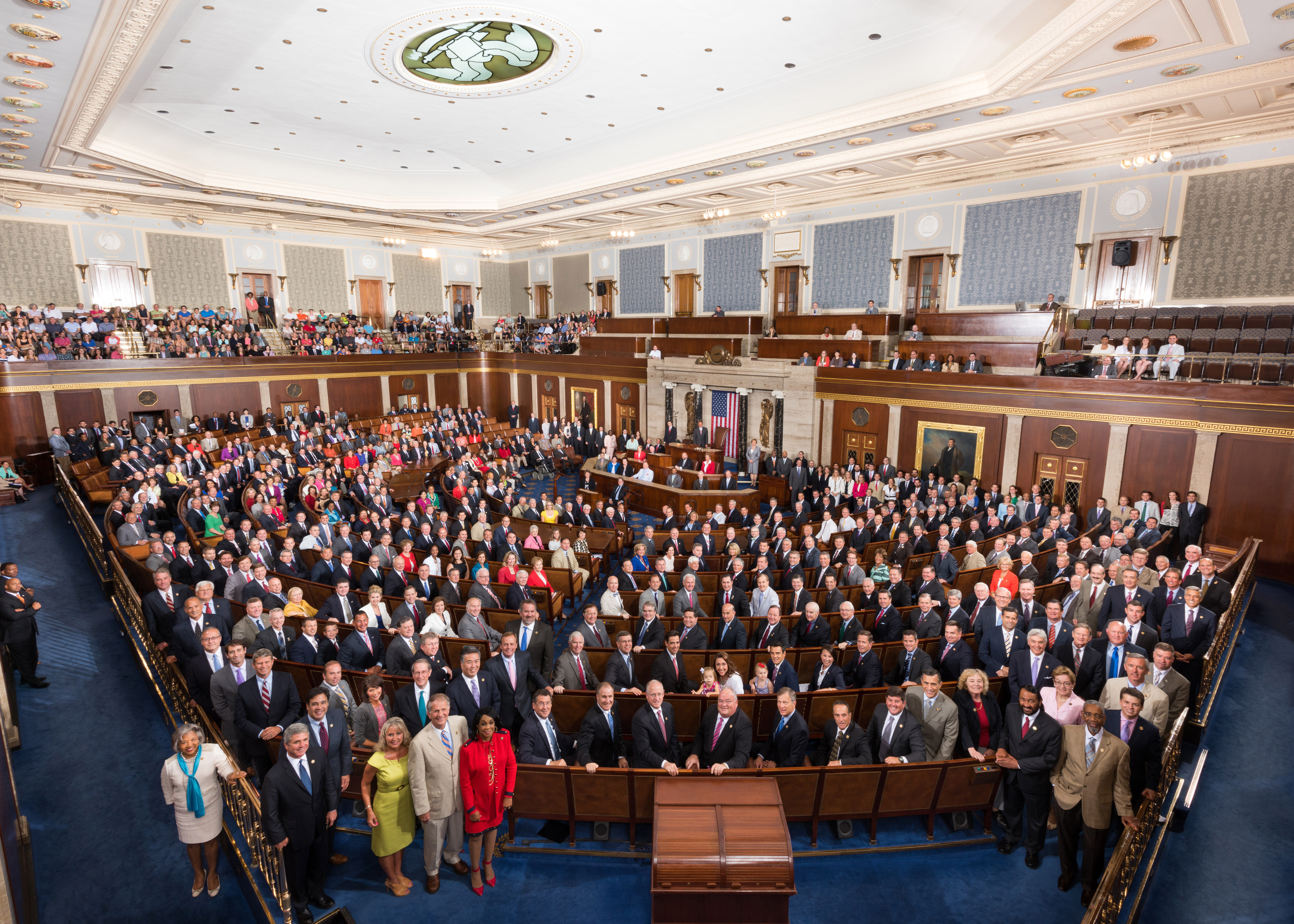
Members of the U.S. House of Representatives, July 22, 2015

Composition of the House by district (2014 election results). Bright red are pick-ups by Republicans, bright blue are pick-ups by Democrats.

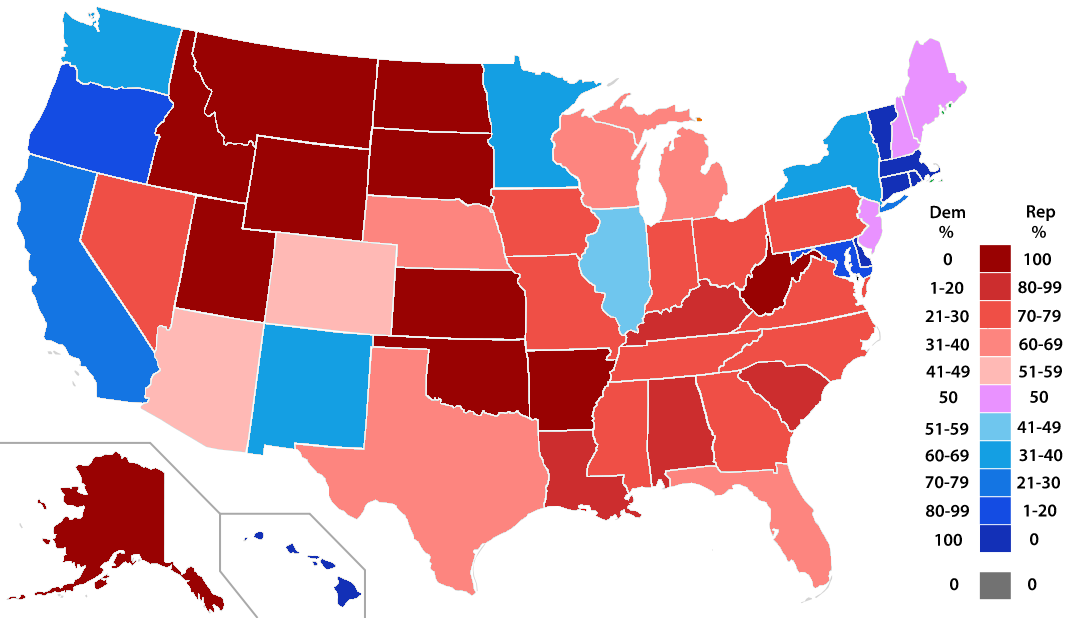
Percentage of members from each party by state, ranging from dark blue (most Democratic) to dark red (most Republican).

House majority leadership

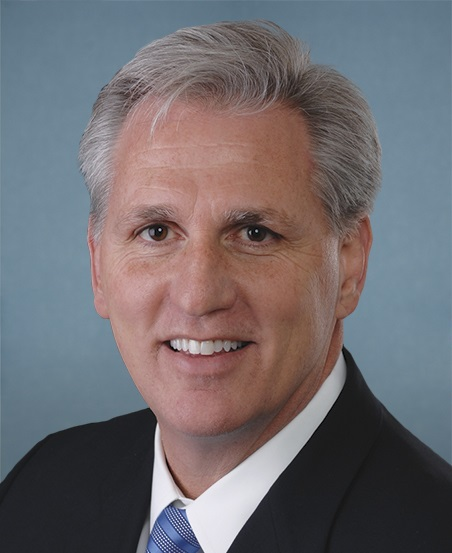
Republican leader
Kevin McCarthy

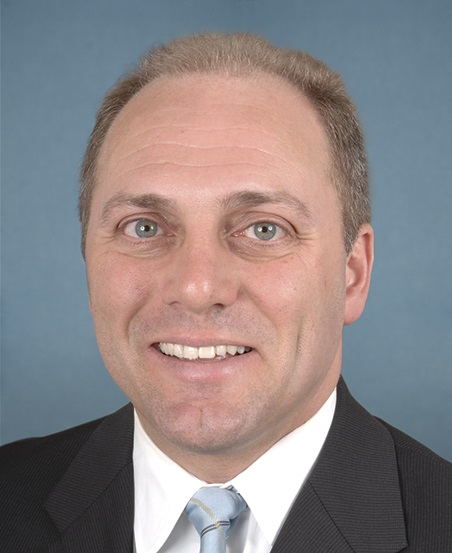
Republican whip
Steve Scalise

House minority leadership

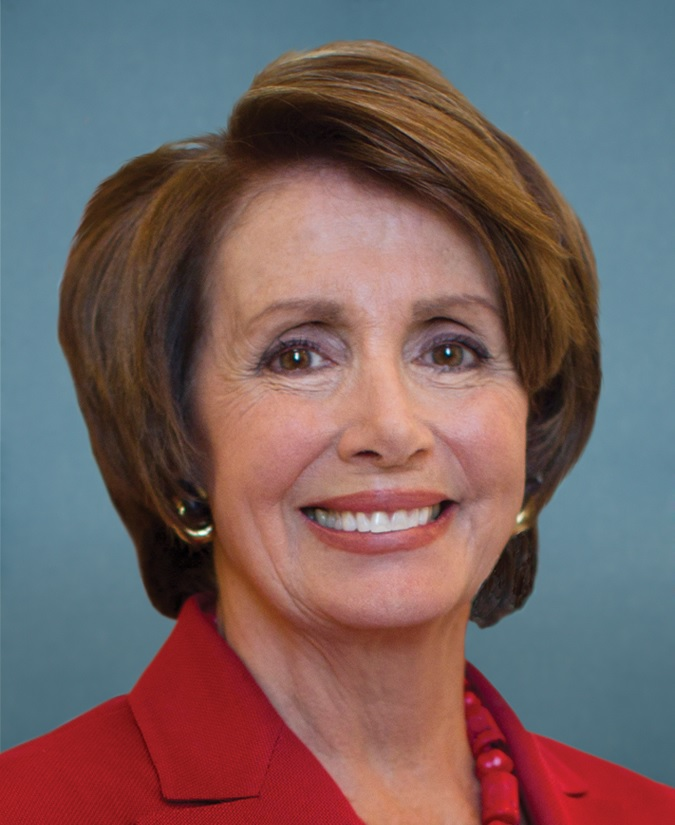
Democratic leader
Nancy Pelosi

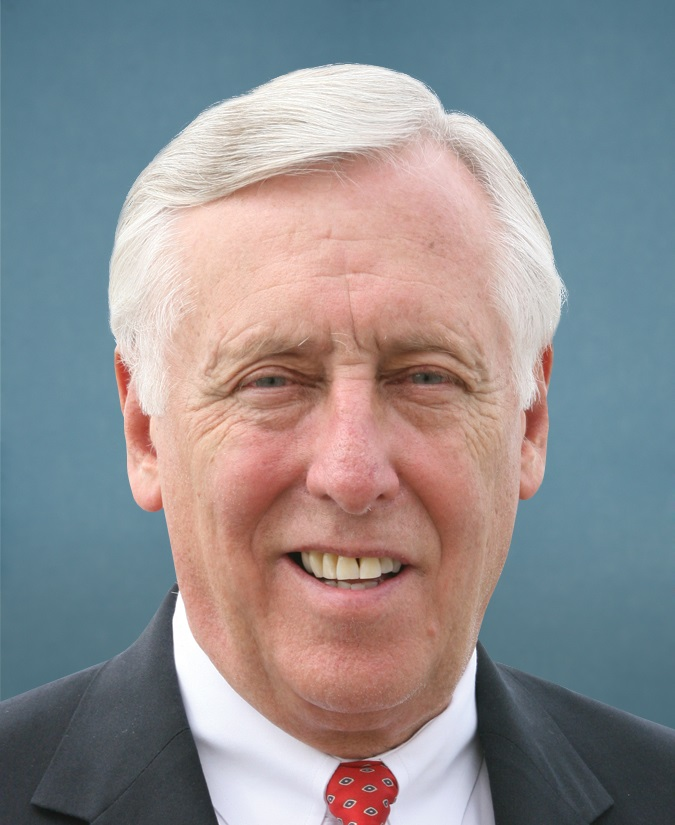
Democratic whip
Steny Hoyer

== Changes in membership ==
=== Senate ===
There were no changes in Senate membership during this Congress.

=== House of Representatives ===
House changes
District	Vacated by	Reason for change	Successor	Date of successor's formal installation (Note: When seated or oath administered, not necessarily when service began.)
New York 11th	Michael Grimm (R)	Incumbent resigned January 5, 2015, following a guilty plea on one count of felony tax evasion. A special election was held May 5, 2015.	Dan Donovan (R)	May 12, 2015
Mississippi 1st	Alan Nunnelee (R)	Incumbent died February 6, 2015. A special election runoff was held June 2, 2015.	Trent Kelly (R)	June 9, 2015
Illinois 18th	Aaron Schock (R)	Incumbent resigned March 31, 2015, following a spending scandal. A special election was held September 10, 2015.	Darin LaHood (R)	September 17, 2015
Ohio 8th	John Boehner (R)	Incumbent resigned October 31, 2015. A special election was held June 7, 2016.	Warren Davidson (R)	June 9, 2016
Pennsylvania 2nd	Chaka Fattah (D)	Incumbent resigned June 23, 2016, following a conviction of corruption charges. A special election was held November 8, 2016.	Dwight Evans (D)	November 14, 2016
Hawaii 1st	Mark Takai (D)	Incumbent died July 20, 2016. A special election was held November 8, 2016.	Colleen Hanabusa (D)	November 14, 2016
Kentucky 1st	Ed Whitfield (R)	Incumbent resigned September 6, 2016, following an ethics investigation. A special election was held November 8, 2016.	James Comer (R)	November 14, 2016
California 44th	Janice Hahn (D)	Incumbent resigned December 4, 2016, to become a member of the Los Angeles County Board of Supervisors. No special election was held and the seat remained vacant until the next Congress. Hahn did not run for re-election in 2016.	Vacant until the next Congress	
Michigan's 10th	Candice Miller (R)	Incumbent resigned December 31, 2016, to become Macomb County Public Works Commissioner. No special election was held and the seat remained vacant until the next Congress. Miller did not run for re-election in 2016.	Vacant until the next Congress	

== Committees ==
[Section contents: Senate, House, Joint ]

=== Senate ===
Committee	Chairman	Ranking Member
Agriculture, Nutrition and Forestry	Pat Roberts (R-KS)	Debbie Stabenow (D-MI)
Appropriations	Thad Cochran (R-MS)	Barbara Mikulski (D-MD)
Armed Services	John McCain (R-AZ)	Jack Reed (D-RI)
Banking, Housing and Urban Affairs	Richard Shelby (R-AL)	Sherrod Brown (D-OH)
Budget	Mike Enzi (R-WY)	Bernie Sanders (I-VT)
Commerce, Science and Transportation	John Thune (R-SD)	Bill Nelson (D-FL)
Energy and Natural Resources	Lisa Murkowski (R-AK)	Maria Cantwell (D-WA)
Environment and Public Works	Jim Inhofe (R-OK)	Barbara Boxer (D-CA)
Finance	Orrin Hatch (R-UT)	Ron Wyden (D-OR)
Foreign Relations	Bob Corker (R-TN)	Ben Cardin (D-MD)
Health, Education, Labor and Pensions	Lamar Alexander (R-TN)	Patty Murray (D-WA)
Homeland Security and Governmental Affairs	Ron Johnson (R-WI)	Thomas Carper (D-DE)
Indian Affairs	John Barrasso (R-WY)	Jon Tester (D-MT)
Judiciary	Chuck Grassley (R-IA)	Patrick Leahy (D-VT)
Rules and Administration	Roy Blunt (R-MO)	Chuck Schumer (D-NY)
Small Business and Entrepreneurship	David Vitter (R-LA)	Jeanne Shaheen (D-NH)
Veterans' Affairs	Johnny Isakson (R-GA)	Richard Blumenthal (D-CT)

=== House of Representatives ===
Committee	Chairman	Ranking Member
Agriculture	Michael Conaway (R-TX)	Collin Peterson (D-MN)
Appropriations	Harold Rogers (R-KY)	Nita Lowey (D-NY)
Armed Services	Mac Thornberry (R-TX)	Adam Smith (D-WA)
Budget	Tom Price (R-GA)	Chris Van Hollen (D-MD)
Education and the Workforce	John Kline (R-MN)	Bobby Scott (D-VA)
Energy and Commerce	Fred Upton (R-MI)	Frank Pallone (D-NJ)
Ethics	Charlie Dent (R-PA)	Linda Sánchez (D-CA)
Financial Services	Jeb Hensarling (R-TX)	Maxine Waters (D-CA)
Foreign Affairs	Edward Royce (R-CA)	Eliot Engel (D-NY)
Homeland Security	Michael McCaul (R-TX)	Bennie Thompson (D-MS)
House Administration	Candice Miller (R-MI)	Robert Brady (D-PA)
Judiciary	Bob Goodlatte (R-VA)	John Conyers (D-MI)
Natural Resources	Rob Bishop (R-UT)	Raul Grijalva (D-AZ)
Oversight and Government Reform	Jason Chaffetz (R-UT)	Elijah Cummings (D-MD)
Rules	Pete Sessions (R-TX)	Louise Slaughter (D-NY)
Science, Space & Technology	Lamar Smith (R-TX)	Eddie Bernice Johnson (D-TX)
Small Business	Steve Chabot (R-OH)	Nydia Velázquez (D-NY)
Transportation and Infrastructure	Bill Shuster (R-PA)	Peter DeFazio (D-OR)
Veterans' Affairs	Jeff Miller (R-FL)	Corrine Brown (D-FL)
Ways and Means	Kevin Brady (R-TX)	Sander Levin (D-MI)
Permanent Select Committee on Intelligence	Devin Nunes (R-CA)	Adam Schiff (D-CA)

=== Joint committees ===
Committee	Chairman	Vice Chairman
Joint Economic Committee	Sen. Dan Coats (R-IN)	Rep. Pat Tiberi (R-OH)
Joint Committee on Inaugural Ceremonies (Special)	Sen. Roy Blunt (R-MO)	Rep. Paul Ryan (R-WI)
Joint Committee on the Library	Sen. Roy Blunt (R-MO)	Rep. Gregg Harper (R-MS)
Joint Committee on Printing	Rep. Gregg Harper (R-MS)	Sen. Roy Blunt (R-MO)
Joint Committee on Taxation	Rep. Kevin Brady (R-TX)	Sen. Orrin Hatch (R-UT)

== Employees ==
=== Senate ===
Source: "Senate Organization Chart for the 114th Congress". Senate.gov. US Senate. Archived from the original on March 28, 2015.

- Chaplain: Barry C. Black (Seventh-day Adventist)
- Curator: Melinda Smith
- Librarian: Leona I. Faust
- Historian: Donald A. Ritchie, until June 1, 2015
  - Betty Koed, starting June 1, 2015
- Parliamentarian: Elizabeth MacDonough
- Secretary: Julie E. Adams
- Sergeant at Arms: Frank J. Larkin
- Secretary for the Majority: Laura Dove
- Secretary for the Minority: Gary B. Myrick

=== House of Representatives ===
Source: "Officers and Organizations of the House". House.gov. US House. Archived from the original on July 6, 2017.

- Chaplain: Patrick J. Conroy (Roman Catholic)
- Chief Administrative Officer: Ed Cassidy, until December 31, 2015
  - Will Plaster, January 1, 2016 – August 1, 2016
  - Phil Kiko, from August 1, 2016
- Clerk: Karen L. Haas
- Historian: Matthew Wasniewski
- Inspector General: Theresa M. Grafenstine
- Parliamentarian: Thomas J. Wickham Jr.
- Reading Clerks: Susan Cole (R) and Joseph Novotny (D)
- Sergeant at Arms: Paul D. Irving

=== Legislative branch agency directors ===
- Architect of the Capitol: Stephen T. Ayers
- Attending Physician of the United States Congress: Brian P. Monahan
- Comptroller General of the United States: Eugene Louis Dodaro
- Director of the Congressional Budget Office: Douglas Elmendorf, until March 31, 2015
  - Keith Hall, from April 1, 2015
- Librarian of Congress: James H. Billington, until September 30, 2015
  - David S. Mao (acting), October 1, 2015 – September 14, 2016
  - Carla Diane Hayden, from September 14, 2016
- Public Printer of the United States: Davita Vance-Cooks

== See also ==
=== Elections ===
- 2014 United States elections (elections leading to this Congress)
  - 2014 United States Senate elections
  - 2014 United States House of Representatives elections
- 2016 United States elections (elections during this Congress, leading to the next Congress)
  - 2016 United States presidential election
  - 2016 United States Senate elections
  - 2016 United States House of Representatives elections

=== Membership lists ===
- List of new members of the 114th United States Congress
