= Big Guns =

Big Guns may refer to:

- "Big Guns" (Dad's Army), a 1969 episode of Dad's Army
- Big Guns (pinball), a pinball machine
- Big Guns (TV series), a 1958 British TV series
- Big Guns (1973 film) or Tony Arzenta, starring Alain Delon
- Big Guns (1987 film), a 1987 gay pornographic film
- Big Guns (novel), a 2018 satirical novel by Steve Israel
- "Big Guns", a song on Skid Row's 1989 album Skid Row
- Big Guns (album), an album by Rory Gallagher
- "The Big Guns", an episode of the television series Modern Family
- The Big Guns (professional wrestling), a Japanese professional wrestling tag team
