= Gerardo Hernandez Airport Security Act of 2014 =

- Long title: To improve intergovernmental planning for and communication during security incidents at domestic airports, and for other purposes.
- Announced in: the 113th United States Congress
- Sponsored by: Rep. Richard Hudson (R, NC-8)
- Number of co-sponsors: 0

Codification
- Agencies affected: Transportation Security Administration, Federal Emergency Management Agency, Department of Homeland Security

Legislative history
- Introduced in the House as H.R. 4802 by Rep. Richard Hudson (R, NC-8) on June 5, 2014; Committee consideration by United States House Committee on Homeland Security; Passed the House on July 22, 2014 (voice vote)

The Gerardo Hernandez Airport Security Act of 2014 (H.R. 4802) is a bill that would direct the Transportation Security Administration (TSA) to undertake a variety of activities aimed at enhancing security at airports where the TSA performs or oversees security-related activities. The bill would require the TSA to verify that all such airports have appropriate response plans, to share best practices with each airport, as well as to report to Congress on the capacity of law enforcement, fire and medical response teams to communicate and respond to security threats at airports.

The bill was introduced into the United States House of Representatives during the 113th United States Congress. It did not pass. The bill was reintroduced in the 114th United States Congress and passed as the Gerardo Hernandez Airport Security Act of 2015.(H.R. 720, Pub. L. 114–50 (text) (PDF))

== Background ==
This bill is named in the honor of TSA Officer Gerardo I. Hernandez. Hernandez was 39 when he was shot and killed while on duty during a shooting targeting TSA officers at the Los Angeles International Airport on November 1, 2013. Hernandez was the first TSA officer in the twelve-year history of the agency to have been killed while on duty. A behavior detection officer, Hernandez had immigrated to the United States from El Salvador at age 15.

== Provisions of the bill ==
This summary is based largely on the summary provided by the Congressional Research Service, a public domain source.

The Airport Security Enhancement Act of 2014 would direct the Assistant Secretary of Homeland Security (Transportation Security) of the United States Department of Homeland Security (DHS) to: (1) conduct outreach to all U.S. airports at which the Transportation Security Administration (TSA) performs, or oversees the implementation and performance of, security measures; and (2) give necessary technical assistance to verify that such airports have in place individualized working plans for responding to security incidents inside the airport perimeter, including active shooters, acts of terrorism, and incidents that target passenger-screening checkpoints.

The bill would require the Assistant Secretary to: (1) identify best practices that exist across airports for security incident planning, management, and training; and (2) establish a mechanism through which to share those best practices with other airport operators nationwide.

The bill would require the Assistant Secretary also to: (1) certify annually to specified congressional committees that all screening personnel have participated in practical training exercises for active shooter scenarios, and (2) analyze for those same committees how TSA can use cost savings achieved through efficiencies to increase over the next five fiscal years the funding available for checkpoint screening law enforcement support reimbursable agreements.

== Congressional Budget Office report ==
This summary is based largely on the summary provided by the Congressional Budget Office, as ordered reported by the House Committee on Homeland Security on June 11, 2014. This is a public domain source.

H.R. 4802 would direct the Assistant Secretary of Homeland Security, acting through the Transportation Security Administration (TSA), to undertake a variety of activities aimed at enhancing security at airports where TSA performs or oversees security-related activities. The bill would require TSA to verify that all such airports have plans in place for responding to security threats and to provide technical assistance as necessary to improve such plans. H.R. 4802 also would require TSA to disseminate information on best practices for addressing security threats and ensure that all screening personnel have received training in how to handle potential shooting threats. Finally, H.R. 4802 would require the Department of Homeland Security’s (DHS’s) Office of Cybersecurity and Communications to report to the Congress on the capacity of law enforcement, fire, and medical response teams to communicate and respond to security threats at airports.

Based on information from DHS, the Congressional Budget Office (CBO) estimates that implementing H.R. 4802 would cost about $2.5 million in 2015, assuming appropriation of the necessary amounts. Of that amount, CBO assumes the department would spend about $1.5 million to provide additional technical assistance to airports and about $1 million to evaluate the interoperability of communication systems used by emergency response teams. H.R. 4802 would not affect direct spending or revenues; therefore, pay-as-you-go procedures do not apply.

H.R. 4802 contains no intergovernmental or private-sector mandates as defined in the Unfunded Mandates Reform Act and would impose no costs on state, local, or tribal governments.

== Procedural history ==
The Gerardo Hernandez Airport Security Act of 2014 was introduced into the United States House of Representatives on June 5, 2014 by Rep. Richard Hudson (R, NC-8). It was referred to the United States House Committee on Homeland Security. On July 22, 2014, the House voted in a voice vote to pass the bill.

== Debate and discussion ==
According to Rep. Hudson, who introduced the bill, its goal is to use "the lessons learned from last year's shooting at Los Angeles International Airport."

An after-action report evaluating the events of the 2013 LAX shooting found that "there was a lack of communication among airport officials, police, EMS and federal authorities" and that some of the airport's emergency equipment (such as panic buttons) did not work.

Rep. Maxine Waters (D-CA) supported the bill, saying "the safety and security of our nation's airports and all of the workers and travelers who pass through them is of paramount importance."

== See also ==
- List of bills in the 113th United States Congress
- List of airports in the United States
