= An Act to extend the Undetectable Firearms Act of 1988 for 10 years =

US law

- Long title: To extend the Undetectable Firearms Act of 1988 for 10 years.
- Announced in: the 113th United States Congress
- Sponsored by: Rep. Howard Coble (R-NC)
- Number of co-sponsors: 2

Citations
- Public law: Pub. L. 113–57 (text) (PDF)

Codification
- Acts affected: Undetectable Firearms Act of 1988
- U.S.C. sections affected: 18 U.S.C. §§ 922–note

Legislative history
- Introduced in the House as H.R. 3626 by Rep. Howard Coble (R-NC) on December 2, 2013; Committee consideration by United States House Committee on the Judiciary; Passed the House on December 3, 2013 (voice vote); Passed the Senate on December 9, 2013 (unanimous consent); Signed into law by President Barack Obama on December 9, 2013

The bill H.R. 3626, long title "To extend the Undetectable Firearms Act of 1988 for 10 years", is a bill that extended the Undetectable Firearms Act of 1988 for ten years. The Undetectable Firearms Act of 1988 made it "unlawful to manufacture, import, sell, ship, deliver, possess, transfer, or receive any firearm" that is not detectable by a walk-through metal detector or "of which any major component, when subjected to inspection by x-ray machines commonly used at airports, does not generate an image that accurately depicts the shape of the component." H.R. 3626 passed the United States House of Representatives during the 113th United States Congress.

== Background ==
The Undetectable Firearms Act of 1988 Pub. L. 100–649 was signed into law by President Ronald Reagan on November 10, 1988. The law included a ten-year sunset clause, and expired on November 10, 1998. Congress renewed the law for five years in 1998 (Pub. L. 105–277 (text) (PDF), H.R. 4328, 112 Stat. 2681, enacted October 21, 1998), and it again expired. In 2003, Congress re-authorized the ban for another ten years (Pub. L. 108–174 (text) (PDF), H.R. 3348, 117 Stat. 2481, enacted December 9, 2003). The law would have expired again on December 9, 2013, without Congressional intervention.

== Provisions of the bill ==
H.R. 3626 is a short bill that only alters one line of text in the original 1988 bill by extending the date of the sunset provision, moving it back 10 years.

The bill, as passed by the House, would not prevent someone from using a 3D printing process to make a plastic gun, but it would require that gun to include a metal component.

== Procedural history ==
The bill H.R. 3626 was introduced in the United States House of Representatives on December 2, 2013, by Rep. Howard Coble (R-NC). Rep. Steve Israel (D-NY) was an original cosponsor of the bill. It was referred to the United States House Committee on the Judiciary. No hearings were held on the bill. On November 27, 2013, prior to the bill's introduction, Majority Leader Eric Cantor announced that on December 3, 2013, the House would consider under a suspension of the rules an unspecified bill entitled "To extend the Undetectable Firearms Act of 1988 for 10 years" and sponsored by Rep Coble. On December 3, 2013, the House voted to pass the bill by a voice vote.

On December 9, 2013, H.R. 3626 was sent to the United States Senate, where it was read twice, considered, and read a third time before being passed with unanimous consent. President Barack Obama signed the bill into law the same day.

Without intervention, the bill was set to expire in December 2023, but in November 2023 it was extended until December 2024.

== Debate and discussion ==
The version of the bill that passed the House only extends the Undetectable Firearms Act of 1988; it does not modify its provisions. Some Democrats wanted to make some modifications, however, by requiring metal components to be a permanent part of a plastic gun, rather than removable. Senator Chuck Schumer of New York was one of those Democrats. He announced that he would try to pass a rival bill in the Senate that would include additional restrictions on plastic guns and expand the law.

The National Rifle Association (NRA) released a statement on December 3, 2013, that it "strongly opposes ANY expansion of the Undetectable Firearms Act, including applying the UFA to magazines, gun parts, or the development of new technologies." According to the statement, the NRA considers H.R. 3626 a simple reauthorization, rather than an expansion, so it does not oppose the bill. The NRA does, however, oppose the proposal of Senator Schumer which would be an expansion. The 10 year reauthorization is considered a positive feature for those opposed to additional gun restrictions by reducing opportunities for Democrats to use additional renewals as chances to expand gun control.

The National Shooting Sports Foundation (NSSF) also announced that it supports the reauthorization of the Undetectable Firearms Act and opposes any expansion of that act. In a letter to Congress, the NSSF stated that "as the trade association for the firearms industry, we are always concerned that laws and regulations do not hamper the ability of our members to take advantage of technological advancements in manufacturing processes and in product research and design." The group said they supported a "clean reauthorization".

The Gun Owners of America group announced its opposition to the bill. In an op-ed published by USA Today, Gun Owners of America's director of communications Erich Pratt wrote that "Renewing a ban on plastic firearms will not stop criminals from making them or stealing them...Smuggling guns onto planes will still be against the law, with or without a plastic gun ban." Pratt also called the law "poorly drafted", expressing the concern that "in the hands of an anti-gun president and attorney general, the language could be expanded to cover guns with non-metal parts (even guns with wood stocks)." Pratt also objected to the law on Constitutional grounds, arguing that "the Bill of Rights is pretty unequivocal when it guarantees that our gun rights 'shall not be infringed.'"

== See also ==
- 3D printed firearms
- 3D printing
- Gun control
- Gun politics in the United States
- Improvised firearm
- List of bills in the 113th United States Congress
- Undetectable Firearms Act of 1988
