= American Innovation and Competitiveness Act =

2017 U.S. legislation

American Innovation and Competitiveness Act of 2017
- Acronyms (colloquial): AICA
- Nicknames: American Innovation and Competitiveness Act
- Enacted by: the 114th United States Congress

Citations
- Public law: Pub. L. 114–329 (text) (PDF)

Legislative history
- Introduced in the Senate as S. 3084 by Cory Gardner (R–CO) on June 22, 2016; Committee consideration by Senate Committee on Commerce, Science, and Transportation; Passed the Senate on December 10, 2016; Passed the House on December 16, 2016; Signed into law by President Barack Obama on January 6, 2017

The American Innovation and Competitiveness Act (AICA) is a United States federal law enacted in 2017 by President Barack Obama that aims to invest in cybersecurity and cryptography research. The legislation was initially introduced in the Senate by Cory Gardner (R-CO) and Gary Peters (D-MI). The legislation serves as a reauthorization of the 2010 America COMPETES Act that expired in 2013.

The legislation updates instructions to the National Science Foundation and the National Institute of Standards and Technology (NIST), with a director of security position being created in the latter. AICA supports the coordination of citizen science and crowdsourcing by Federal agencies to accomplish their missions.

== Provisions ==
As a result of AICA:

- Program requirements on the Networking and Information Technology Research and Development program, which coordinates advanced computer research across U.S. government agencies, were revised
- The Office of Management and Budget was given the responsibility to create an interagency working group to reduce administrative burdens on federally-funded researchers.
- Both interagency advisory panel and working groups were created to consider education for science, technology, engineering, and mathematics (STEM) fields.

== See also ==
- Computer security
- Information assurance
- Information security
- Information security management system
- IT risk
- Threat (computer)
- Vulnerability (computing)
