= First Responder Anthrax Preparedness Act =

First Responder Anthrax Preparedness Act of 2016
- Long title: An act to direct the Secretary of Homeland Security to make anthrax vaccines available to emergency response providers, and for other purposes.
- Announced in: the 114th United States Congress
- Sponsored by: U.S. Kelly Ayotte (R-NH)
- Number of co-sponsors: 18

Citations
- Public law: 114-268

Codification
- U.S.C. sections affected: 42 U.S.C. § 247d

Legislative history
- Introduced in the Senate as S. 1915 by Kelly Ayotte (R–NH) on August 3, 2015; Committee consideration by United States Senate Committee on Homeland Security and Governmental Affairs. Reported by Senator Johnson with an amendment in the nature of a substitute and an amendment to the title on May 9, 2016.; Passed the U.S. Senate on 11/16/2016 (Unanimous consent); Passed the U.S. House on 11/29/2016; Signed into law by President Barack Obama on 12/14/16

The First Responder Anthrax Preparedness Act is a law introduced in the United States Senate by U.S. Senator Kelly Ayotte (R-New Hampshire). The law will set up a pilot program that provides anthrax vaccines from the U.S. Strategic National Stockpile to first responders, the Department of Homeland Security (DHS) would create a tracking system for those who receive the vaccine, and the government would prioritize vaccines close to the end of their labeled dates. The Congressional Budget Office estimated that implementing the law would cost about $4 million over the 2016-2020 period.

The bill was passed by the U.S. Senate by unanimous consent on November 16, 2016. Along with Ayotte, the bill was cosponsored by U.S. Sens. Cory Booker (D-NJ) and Chris Coons (D-DE). It was signed into law by the President on December 14, 2016.

The legislation is notable because it would be the first time the strategic stockpile would be used for vaccination in preparation for a biological attack, instead of during or after an attack.

== Background ==
The 2001 anthrax attacks, also known as Amerithrax from its Federal Bureau of Investigation (FBI) case name, occurred within the United States over the course of several weeks beginning on September 18, 2001, one week after the September 11 attacks. Letters containing anthrax spores were mailed to several news media offices and two Democratic U.S. Senators, killing five people and infecting 17 others. According to the FBI, the ensuing investigation became "one of the largest and most complex in the history of law enforcement."

The anthrax attacks, as well as the September 11, 2001 attacks, spurred significant increases in U.S. government funding for biological warfare research and preparedness. For example, biowarfare-related funding at the National Institute of Allergy and Infectious Diseases (NIAID) increased by $1.5 billion in 2003. In 2004, Congress passed the Project Bioshield Act, which provides $5.6 billion over ten years for the purchase of new vaccines and drugs.

== Major provisions ==
This law requires the Department of Homeland Security (DHS) and Department of Health and Human Services (HHS) to carry out a pilot program to provide anthrax vaccines nearing their expiration dates from the strategic national stockpile to emergency responders who would be at high risk of exposure to anthrax if an attack occurred.

HHS shall determine whether an anthrax vaccine is eligible to be provided to DHS for the program based on determinations that the vaccine is not otherwise allotted for other purposes and the provision of the vaccine will not reduce or otherwise adversely affect the capability to meet projected requirements for such product during a public health emergency.

DHS shall establish a communication platform, develop and deliver education and training, conduct an economic analysis, create a logistical platform, establish goals for the program, and establish a mechanism to reimburse HHS for the costs of shipment of vaccines provided to DHS under the program and the amount the storage costs of the stockpile are increased by the program.

DHS will select 2–5 states for voluntary participation in the program, provide guidance to participating states and local governments on identifying high risk providers, and require each participating state to submit a written certification that each participating emergency response provider is given information about the risks and notice that the federal government is not obligated to continue providing anthrax vaccine after the program ends. Each state that participates in the program shall ensure that such participation is consistent with the state's All-Hazards Public Health Emergency Preparedness and Response Plan.

A report should be compiled and determine whether the program should continue beyond five years after enactment of this bill and shall include an analysis of the costs and benefits of continuing the program, an explanation of the economic, health, and other risks and benefits of administering vaccines through the program rather than post-event treatment, and a plan under which the program could be continued.

== Legislative history ==
A separate version of the bill was passed in the U.S. House in July 2015. It was subsequently approved in December 2015 by the Senate Homeland Security and Governmental Affairs Committee.

On August 3, 2015, Ayotte introduced the Senate version of the bill, S. 1915.

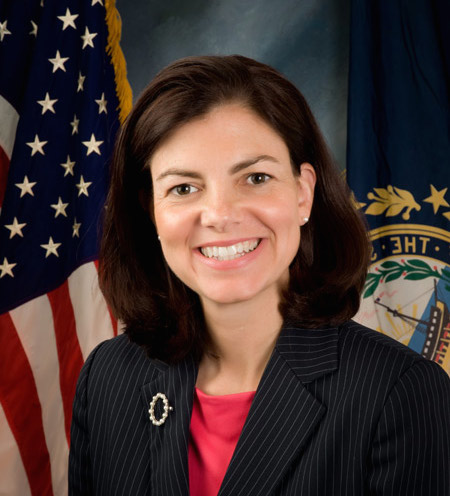
U.S. Senator Kelly Ayotte, chief sponsor of the legislation

11/17/16 - The bill was sent to the House of Representatives.

After introduction:

- 12/9/15 - The Senate Committee on Homeland Security and Governmental Affairs considered the bill and ordered it to be reported out of committee favorably, with some amendments.
- 5/9/16 - The Senate Committee on Homeland Security and Governmental Affairs again reported a separate version of the bill, along with a committee report (Senate Report 114-251).
- 11/16/16 - The bill passed the Senate by unanimous consent.
- 11/29/16 - The bill was passed by the House.
- 12/2/16 - The bill was presented to President Barack Obama.
- 12/14/16 - The bill was signed into law, becoming Public Law 114-268.

== See also ==
- Anthrax vaccine adsorbed
- Biological hazard
- Bioterrorism
- United States biological defense program
