= Grants Oversight and New Efficiency Act =

- Acronyms (colloquial): GONE Act
- Enacted by: the 114th United States Congress

Citations
- Public law: Pub. L. 114–117 (text) (PDF)
- Statutes at Large: 130 Stat. 6

Legislative history
- Introduced in the Senate as S. 1115 by Rep. Deb Fischer (R-NE) on April 28, 2015; Committee consideration by United States Senate Committee on Homeland Security and Governmental Affairs; United States House Committee on Oversight and Reform; Signed into law by President Barack Obama on January 28, 2016

The Grants Oversight and New Efficiency Act, also known as the GONE Act, (Pub. L. 114–117 (text) (PDF), 130 Stat. 6, enacted January 28, 2016), is a law intended to close out expired, empty grant accounts.

== Description ==
The law requires the Office of Management and Budget (OMB) to direct agencies, in coordination with the Department of Health and Human Services (HHS), to provide to Congress a list of certain expired grants held by federal agencies, and include a description of the reasons why the listed grants have not yet been closed. The intent is that this identification contributes to a reduction in the number of expired grants that have not been properly closed out from the financial payment systems.

Delays by federal agencies in closing expired grants were highlighted in an April 2012 report by the Government Accountability Office (GAO). The GAO identified more than 10,000 grants that had remained active within one major payment systems, even though the grants were clearly inactive or past the end date of the grant period.

There is a financial cost associated with maintaining a grant in an open status, as opposed to closing the grant in a timely manner. GAO reported that for one multiagency grant payment system, the government was "...charged a total of roughly $173,000 per month to maintain the more than 28,000 expired grant accounts with zero dollar balances listed on the year end closeout report."
