= United States-Israel Advanced Research Partnership Act of 2016 =

- Long title: An to amend the Homeland Security Act of 2002 and the United States-Israel Strategic Partnership Act of 2014 to promote cooperative homeland security research and antiterrorism programs relating to cybersecurity, and for other purposes.
- Announced in: the 114th United States Congress
- Sponsored by: U.S. Rep. John Ratcliffe (R-TX)
- Number of co-sponsors: 2

Citations
- Public law: 114-304

Legislative history
- Introduced in the House as H.R. 5877 by John Ratcliffe (R–TX) on July 14, 2016; Committee consideration by United States House Committee on Homeland Security. United States House Committee on Foreign Affairs; Passed the U.S. House on 11/29/2016; Passed the U.S. Senate on 12/10/2016; Signed into law by President Barack Obama on 12/16/16

The United States-Israel Advanced Research Partnership Act of 2016 (H.R. 5877) was a bill introduced in the United States House by U.S. Representative John Ratcliffe (R-Texas). The Democratic cosponsor is Representative James Langevin (D-RI). The legislation, which was signed into law, allows the U.S. and Israel to cooperate on cybersecurity technologies research and development.

== Background ==
Cybersecurity industry experts believe that collaboration between countries is one of the best way to prevent cyber attacks. A critical need exists for countries to share research and development in the cybersecurity world.

The United States and Israel work together in a research and development program called the Homeland Security Advanced Research Projects Agency.

A 2014 law authorized the Department of Homeland Security to work with Israel on a pilot program to improve:

- Border security
- Maritime security
- Aviation security

== Legislative details ==
H.R. 5877 makes the program permanent by removing the “pilot” designation and adds cybersecurity as the fourth program area.

The law allows the Department of Homeland Security to work together with Israel on cybersecurity initiatives.

The law doesn't authorize any new expenditures. Because the Department of Homeland Security is already carrying out activities similar to this, the Congressional Budget Office estimated that the law would not affect spending. Additionally, H.R. 5877 does not contain any intergovernmental or private-sector mandates.

== Legislative history ==
The bill followed this path from introduction to being signed into law:

- 7/14/16 - The bill was introduced in the House.
- 11/15/16 - It was amended and reported favorably by the House Committee on Homeland Security.
- 11/29/16 - The bill was passed by the full House of Representatives by voice vote.
- 12/10/16 - The Senate passed the bill by unanimous consent.
- 12/16/16 - President Barack Obama signed the bill into law, making it Public Law 114–304.

== See also ==
- Homeland Security Act of 2002
- Information security
- Israeli Ministry of Public Security
- Network security
