= Undetectable Firearms Act =

US law

- Other short titles: Undetectable Firearms Act of 1988
- Long title: An Act to amend title 18, United States Code, to prohibit certain firearms especially useful to terrorists.
- Acronyms (colloquial): UFA, TFDA
- Nicknames: Terrorist Firearms Detection Act of 1988
- Enacted by: the 100th United States Congress
- Effective: December 9, 1988

Citations
- Public law: 100-649
- Statutes at Large: 102 Stat. 3816

Codification
- Titles amended: 18 U.S.C.: Crimes and Criminal Procedure; 49 U.S.C.: Transportation
- U.S.C. sections amended: 18 U.S.C. ch. 44 § 921 et seq.; 49 U.S.C. ch. 449, subch. I § 44901

Legislative history
- Introduced in the House as H.R. 4445 by William J. Hughes (D-NJ) on April 21, 1988; Committee consideration by House Judiciary, Senate Judiciary; Passed the House on May 10, 1988 (413-4); Passed the Senate on May 25, 1988 (Passed voice vote, in lieu of S. 2180) with amendment; House agreed to Senate amendment on October 20, 1988 (Agreed unanimous consent) with further amendment; Senate agreed to House amendment on October 21, 1988 (Agreed voice vote); Signed into law by President Ronald Reagan on November 10, 1988

The United States Undetectable Firearms Act of 1988 (18 U.S.C. § 922(p)) makes it illegal to manufacture, import, sell, ship, deliver, possess, transfer, or receive any firearm that is not as detectable by walk-through metal detection as a security exemplar containing 3.7 oz (105 g) of steel, or any firearm with major components that do not generate an accurate image before standard airport imaging technology.

It was signed into law by President Ronald Reagan on November 10, 1988.

== Overview ==
The general effect of this legislation is a ban on the manufacture, possession and transfer of firearms with less than 3.7 oz (105 g) of metal content. The bill also requires handguns to be in the traditional shape of a handgun. The Act excepts from its prohibitions the federal government and its agencies, and may offer a safe harbor for licensed manufactures testing to determine if their firearms meet the Act's criteria.

== History ==
What became the Undetectable Firearms Act began as an attempt to ban handguns like the Glock 17 in the mid-1980s. Pistols like the Glock had frames and grips made from lightweight polymer, and their novelty prompted public criticism that their relative lack of metal content meant they might be able to slip past airport metal detection and be suitable for use by terrorists.

Initial proposals to ban handguns with less than 8 oz of steel were opposed by the National Rifle Association of America (NRA), and what resulted was a compromise that banned guns with less than half the metal content of the Glock. The NRA agreed not to oppose the Act because it did not affect any existing guns. Introduced by William J. Hughes (D-NJ), it passed overwhelmingly in October 1988.

The gun control lobby was eager to promote it as one of the first successes of groups like Handgun Control, Inc (later the Brady Campaign). The Act set the stage for the 1994 Assault Weapons Ban.

== Renewals ==
The original Act had a ten-year sunset clause, and would have expired on November 10, 1998. Congress subsequently renewed it in 1998 for five years, in 2003 for ten years, in 2013 for another ten years, and in 2024 until March 8, 2031.

Proposals to extend the scope of the law at the 2013 renewal were unsuccessful. At that time, the NRA continued to support the law but opposed any extension of its scope.

== Application to 3D printing ==
With the advent of projects like the Wiki Weapon, 3D printing technologies have been noted for their abilities to help create largely polymer and ceramic firearms. Various groups of makers and tech enthusiasts have experimented with the technology in this capacity as well, leading to widespread speculation that traditional methods of gun control will become increasingly inoperable.

Some 3D printable firearm designs, such as the COVID-22, incorporate compartments for metal inserts to allow for compliance with the Undetectable Firearms Act. This makes the primarily plastic design legal to manufacture in US states that do not otherwise restrict 3D printed, unserialized, or homemade firearms.

Proposed renewals and expansions of the current Undetectable Firearms Act include provisions to criminalize individual production of firearm receivers and magazines that is not detectable by a walk-through metal detector, measures outside the scope of the original UFA and not extended to cover commercial manufacture. The modernization proposals have been criticized as disingenuous attempts to suppress adoption of and experimentation with 3D printers in home gunsmithing.

== See also ==
- Gun control
- Gun law in the United States
- Gun politics in the United States
- Improvised firearm
- To extend the Undetectable Firearms Act of 1988 for 10 years (H.R. 3626; 113th Congress)
