= MEGABYTE Act of 2016 =

American legislation

The Making Electronic Government Accountable By Yielding Tangible Efficiencies Act of 2016 (or the MEGABYTE Act of 2016) is a United States federal law which requires the Director of the Office of Management and Budget to issue a directive on the management of software licenses by the US federal government.

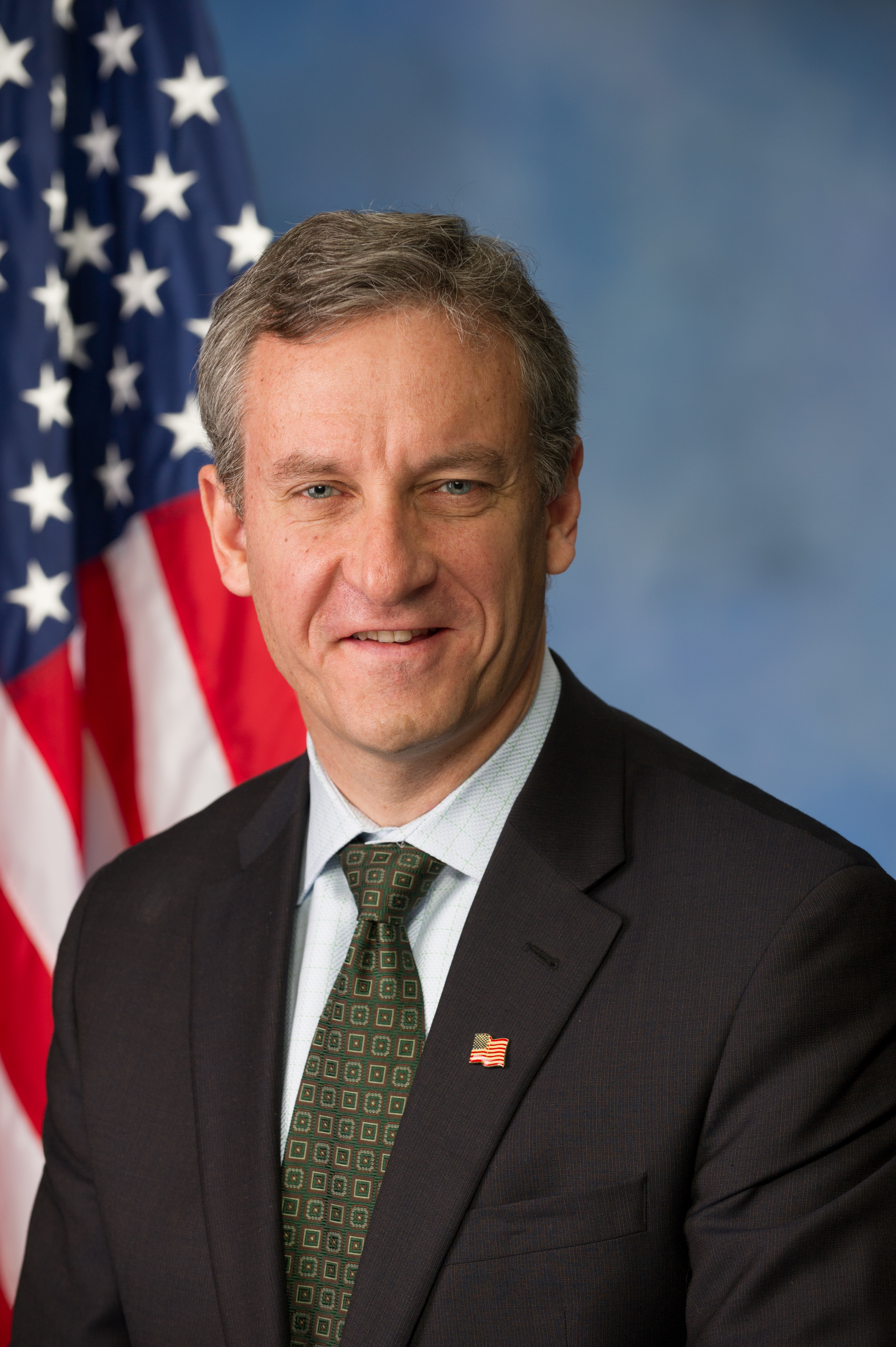
Representative Matt Cartwright

The directive will require the chief information officer (CIO) of each federal agency to develop a comprehensive software licensing policy covering roles in relation to software license management, an inventory of software licenses held by the agency, an analysis of software usage and agency goals covering the use of software within the agency.

The agency CIO must subsequently report after one year and then at five-yearly intervals of the financial savings which have resulted from improved software license management.

The bill was sponsored by Senator Bill Cassidy and Representative Matt Cartwright, and enacted after being signed by President Obama on July 29, 2016. The Congressional Budget Office argued that mostly "the bill would codify and expand current policies and practices of the federal government", but expected that "most of the savings in this area will probably be achieved through current efforts to make cost effective decisions when acquiring software".

In accordance with the act requirements, OMB published M-16-12 Category Management Policy 16-1: Improving the Acquisition and Management of Common Information Technology: Software Licensing.

This established the Enterprise Software Category Team (ESCT), co-managed by GSA, DoD and OMB. It required agencies to appoint a Software Manager for the entire agency. It requires a continual agency-wide inventory of software licenses, Ongoing analysis of license utilization, and reporting of cost savings/avoidance made possible by this policy.

The House of Representatives' Oversight and Government Reform Subcommittee on Government Operations and Information Technology has integrated software policy and inventory monitoring into its oversight of executive agencies' Federal Information Technology Acquisition Reform Act implementation.
