= Big Guns (novel) =

2018 satirical novel

- First edition
- Author: Steve Israel
- Language: English
- Genre: Fiction
- Publisher: Simon & Schuster
- Publication date: April 17, 2018
- Publication place: United States
- Pages: 320
- ISBN: 978-1-5011-1802-9

Big Guns is a 2018 satirical novel by former U.S. Representative from New York Steve Israel. It tells the story of a fictitious arms manufacturer, Cogsworth International, fighting American anti-firearm legislation with a proposal that every American be required to own a gun.
