= Steve Israel =

American politician (born 1958)

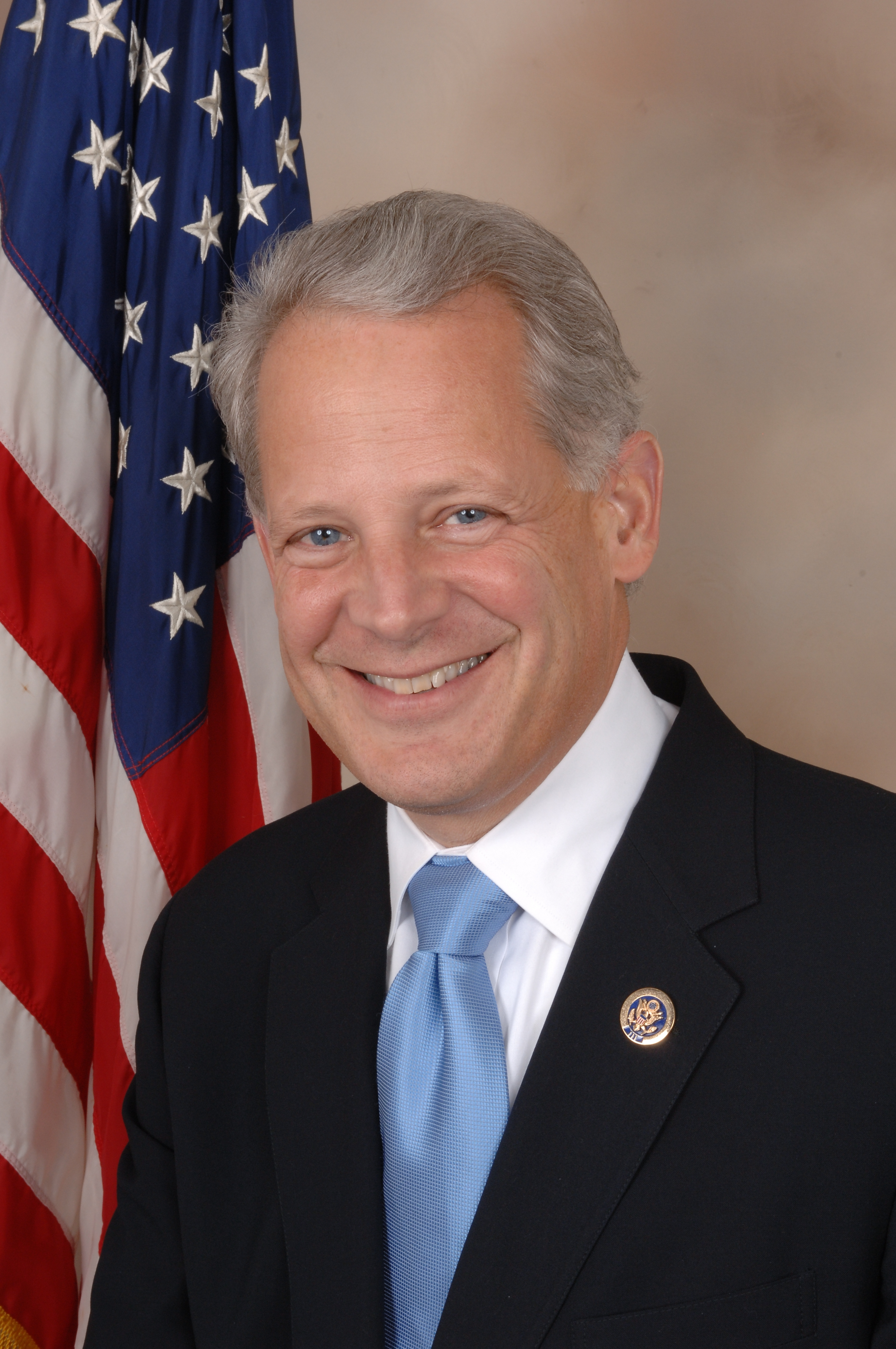
- Official portrait, 2009

Chair of the House Democratic Policy and Communications Committee
- In office January 3, 2015 – January 3, 2017
- Leader: Nancy Pelosi
- Preceded by: Position established
- Succeeded by: Cheri Bustos; David Cicilline; Hakeem Jeffries (Co-Chairs)

Chair of the Democratic Congressional Campaign Committee
- In office January 3, 2011 – January 3, 2015
- Leader: Nancy Pelosi
- Preceded by: Chris Van Hollen
- Succeeded by: Ben Ray Luján

Member of the U.S. House of Representatives from New York
- In office January 3, 2001 – January 3, 2017
- Preceded by: Rick Lazio
- Succeeded by: Tom Suozzi
- Constituency: 2nd district (2001–2013); 3rd district (2013–2017)

Personal details
- Born: Steven Jay Israel; May 30, 1958 (age 68) New York City, U.S.
- Party: Democratic
- Spouses: Marlene Budd (m. 2003; div. 2014); Cara Longworth (m. 2018)
- Children: 2
- Education: Nassau Community College; Syracuse University; George Washington University (BA)
- Israel's voice Steve Israel on rising student loan interest rates. Recorded June 26, 2013

Steven Jay Israel (born May 30, 1958) is an American political commentator, lobbyist, author, bookseller, and former politician. He served as a U.S. representative from New York from 2001 to 2017. A member of the Democratic Party, he was elected in New York's 2nd congressional district until 2013 and New York's 3rd congressional district until his retirement. After leaving Congress in 2017, Israel joined CNN as a political commentator. In 2019, he was appointed the inaugural director of the Institute of Politics and Global Affairs at Cornell University. As of 2022, Israel also serves on the Board of Advisors for lobbying firm Michael Best Strategies.

Israel chaired the Democratic Congressional Campaign Committee from 2011 to 2015 and Democratic Policy and Communications Committee from 2015 to 2017. At the time of his departure from Congress, his district included portions of northern Nassau County and Suffolk County on Long Island, as well as a small portion of Queens in New York City. Prior to his election to Congress, he served on the Huntington Town Board, starting 1993.

== Early life and career ==
Israel was born in Brooklyn and raised in the Long Island community of Levittown, New York. He attended Nassau Community College and Syracuse University for one year before graduating from George Washington University with a Bachelor of Arts in 1982.

After earning his bachelor's degree, Israel became a staff member for U.S. Representative Richard Ottinger. He was later elected to the town council in Huntington, New York, in 1993.

== U.S. House of Representatives ==
=== Elections ===
After Rick Lazio left his House seat to run for the United States Senate in 2000, Israel was elected to his seat, receiving 48% of the vote, defeating Republican Joan Johnson, who received 34%, and four independent candidates. He was reelected seven times with relatively little difficulty, despite representing a swing district on paper.

On January 5, 2016, Israel announced that he would not seek reelection in November 2016.

=== Committee assignments ===
- Committee on Appropriations
  - Subcommittee on Energy and Water Development
  - Subcommittee on State, Foreign Operations, and Related Programs
  - Subcommittee on Military Construction, Veterans Affairs, and Related Agencies

=== Caucus membership ===
- Co-chair and founder of Congressional Center Aisle Caucus
- House Cancer Caucus (Co-chair)
- Long Island Sound Caucus (Co-chair)

=== Party leadership ===
- Assistant Democratic Whip
- House Democratic Caucus Task Force On Defense and the Military (Chair)
- House Democratic Study Group on National Security Policy (Co-chair)

=== Tenure ===
In his second term, Israel was tapped for a leadership position as Assistant Whip. In his third term, Israel was appointed to chair the House Democratic Caucus Task Force on Defense and Military, a group of 15 Democratic House members who reach out to the defense community and advise the House Democratic leadership on military policy.

Israel supported a study on the feasibility of switching from Tuesday to weekend voting.

=== DCCC chairman ===
As an ally of Nancy Pelosi, Israel was mentioned in 2010 as a possible successor to Chris Van Hollen, the chairman of the DCCC; he declined to speak about it until after the midterms were over, saying he was "just completely focused on supporting Nancy Pelosi."

It was reported that Pelosi's selection of Israel to head the DCCC had much to do with the district he represents, where "Democrats hold a modest registration edge but independents decide elections." Israel had gained respect through fundraising and recruiting candidates for the campaign committee. Israel is one of the few Democrats who has run campaign ads in defense of his vote on health care.

== Political positions ==
=== Abortion ===
Israel has said he supports legal abortions in cases of rape, incest, and threat to the life of the mother, though he does not support abortions being legal in all cases. He has voted against bills that would prohibit federal funding for abortions, against a bill that would have eliminated federal funding for Planned Parenthood, and against a bill which would have banned abortions after 20 weeks of pregnancy. Since 2004 he has consistently received 100% ratings from the pro-choice groups NARAL, Planned Parenthood, and the National Family Planning & Reproductive Health Association, as well as a 0% rating from the National Right to Life Committee.

=== Economics ===
In 2008, Israel voted for $25 to bailout JP Morgan Chase through the Troubled Asset Relief Program (TARP).

On July 4, 2013, Israel announced legislation that would require all U.S. national parks to sell merchandise that is Made in the USA.

Israel's support for the Occupy Wall Street movement drew criticism from conservatives, who claimed the movement harbored "anti-Semitic" elements. In response Israel pointed to his support for the state of Israel as well as his own Jewish heritage.

=== Foreign policy ===
In 2002, Israel voted to authorize George W. Bush to use military force in Iraq, even though more than 60 per cent of his Democratic colleagues in the House voted against the bill.

In 2006, in response to Jimmy Carter's book Palestine: Peace Not Apartheid, Israel said, "I disagree with President Carter fundamentally. The reason for the Palestinian plight is the Palestinians."

=== Gun control ===
Israel supports increased gun control on gun ownership. He voted against several bills and amendments which would decrease federal regulation of safety precautions of guns and decrease federal regulations on the sale of firearms. He also cosponsored the 2009 "No Fly, No Buy" Act, stating "Gun safety measures like the 'No Fly, No Buy' Act should be a no-brainer for every member of Congress. It's common sense legislation." He has received an 'F' rating from the pro-gun rights NRA Political Victory Fund and 0% from the Gun Owners of America, as well as 100% ratings from the pro-gun control Brady Campaign to Prevent Gun Violence and the Coalition to Stop Gun Violence. Israel was an original cosponsor of the bill To extend the Undetectable Firearms Act of 1988 for 10 years (H.R. 3626; 113th Congress), which passed the House on December 3, 2013. The bill allowed for a ten-year extension of the Undetectable Firearms Act of 1988, but did not expand any of its provisions (related to plastic guns).

=== Health care ===
Israel voted for the 2010 Affordable Care Act and against several bills attempting to repeal it.

=== LGBT rights ===
Israel supports same-sex marriage. In a June 2009 press release he stated, "I'm proud of what Iowa, Maine, Massachusetts, New Hampshire, Connecticut, and Vermont have done for marriage equality. I hope that my home state of New York will soon follow." New York legalized same-sex marriage in 2011.

He voted for the repeal of Don't ask, don't tell and for the Employment Non-Discrimination Act.

He has a 100% rating from the pro-LGBTQ rights Human Rights Campaign and a 0% rating from the Family Research Council.

=== Social media ===
In October 2022, Israel joined the Council for Responsible Social Media project launched by Issue One to address the negative mental, civic, and public health impacts of social media in the United States co-chaired by former House Democratic Caucus leader Dick Gephardt and former Massachusetts lieutenant governor Kerry Healey.

=== Canada ===
In February 2025, Israel advocated in favor of Donald Trump's efforts to coerce Canada into becoming the 51st state, on the basis that it would increase the base of voters for the Democratic Party.

== J Street controversy ==
Steve Israel was an honorary member of the gala host committee for a gala dinner on October 27, 2009, by J Street, a liberal Zionist pro-Israel lobbying group. In the weeks leading up to the gala, those aligned with Likud, the political party of Israeli Prime Minister Benjamin Netanyahu, criticized Steve Israel and J Street. The Weekly Standard blogger Michael Goldfarb called the J Street dinner an "anti-Israel bash." In response, a spokesperson for Steve Israel said, "It's absurd that this has become a controversy [...] The Congressman agreed to be on the gala host committee. That doesn't mean he agrees with every viewpoint of every speaker at the event".

== Electoral history ==
New York election law allows for fusion voting, where a candidate can run as a member of multiple parties. In 2000 Israel ran only as a Democrat in his winning bid for Congress, but since 2002 he has also run as the candidate for the Independence Party and the Working Families Party.

U.S. House, 2nd District of New York (General Election)
| Year | Winning candidate | Party | Pct | Opponent | Party | Pct |
| 2000 | Steve Israel | Democratic | 48% | Joan B. Johnson | Republican | 35% |
| 2002 | Steve Israel | Democratic | 58% | Joseph P. Finley | Republican | 40% |
| 2004 | Steve Israel | Democratic | 67% | Richard Hoffmann | Republican | 33% |
| 2006 | Steve Israel | Democratic | 70% | John W. Bugler | Republican | 30% |
| 2008 | Steve Israel | Democratic | 67% | Frank J. Stalzer | Republican | 33% |
| 2010 | Steve Israel | Democratic | 56% | John Gomez | Republican | 43% |
| 2012 | Steve Israel | Democratic | 58% | Stephen Labate | Republican | 42% |
| 2014 | Steve Israel | Democratic | 54% | Grant Lally | Republican | 45% |

== Personal life ==
Israel has two adult daughters. He has written two novels of political satire: The Global War on Morris (2014) and Big Guns (2018).

Israel's maternal grandmother immigrated to the United States from Russia, from the city of Pryluky, which is now part of Ukraine, located about 90 miles east of Kiev.

In 2012 following Israel's divorce from Marlene Budd, their house was sold in a short sale, wherein JP Morgan agreed to forgive the outstanding $93,000 of Israel's underwater mortgage. This was the subject of controversy, as Israel had voted in 2008 for $25 billion to bailout JP Morgan Chase through the Troubled Asset Relief Program (TARP). It was also revealed that Israel's original mortgage lenders when he bought the house in 2004 (and who gave the couple two further loans to refinance the house the following year) had made more than $50,000 in campaign and political donations to Israel between 2003-2005.

In November 2021, Israel opened a bookstore in Oyster Bay, New York, named after former president and town resident Theodore Roosevelt.

== Bibliography ==
- Steve Israel, ed. (2007). Charge!: History's Greatest Military Speeches. Naval Institute Press. ISBN 978-1591143994.
- The Global War on Morris. Simon & Schuster. 2014. ISBN 978-1476772233.
- Big Guns. Simon & Schuster. 2018. ISBN 978-1501118029.

== See also ==
- List of Jewish members of the United States Congress

U.S. House of Representatives
| Preceded by Rick Lazio | Member of the U.S. House of Representatives from New York's 2nd congressional district 2001–2013 | Succeeded by Peter King |
| Preceded by Peter King | Member of the U.S. House of Representatives from New York's 3rd congressional district 2013–2017 | Succeeded by Tom Suozzi |
Party political offices
| Preceded by Chris Van Hollen | Chair of the Democratic Congressional Campaign Committee; 2011–2015 | Succeeded by Ben Luján |
| New office | Chair of the Democratic Policy and Communications Committee; 2015–2017 | Succeeded by Cheri Bustos |
| New office | Chair of the Democratic Policy and Communications Committee; 2015–2017 | Succeeded by David Cicilline |
| New office | Chair of the Democratic Policy and Communications Committee; 2015–2017 | Succeeded by Hakeem Jeffries |
U.S. order of precedence (ceremonial)
| Preceded by John M. McHugh as Former U.S. Representative | Order of precedence of the United States as Former U.S. Representative | Succeeded by Charles Taylor as Former U.S. Representative |
