= H.R. 301 (113th Congress) =

Bill in United States Legislature

- Long title: To provide for the establishment of the Special Envoy to Promote Religious Freedom of Religious Minorities in the Near East and South Central Asia.
- Announced in: the 113th United States Congress
- Sponsored by: Rep. Frank R. Wolf (R, VA-10)
- Number of co-sponsors: 8

Codification
- Acts affected: Foreign Assistance Act of 1961, International Religious Freedom Act of 1998
- U.S.C. sections affected: 22 U.S.C. § 2151n(d), 22 U.S.C. § 2304(b), 22 U.S.C. § 6412(b),
- Agencies affected: United States Congress, Commission on Security and Cooperation in Europe, Executive Office of the President, United States Department of State, Bureau of Population, Refugees, and Migration, United Nations, United States Commission on International Religious Freedom,
- Authorizations of appropriations: $1,000,000.00 for each of fiscal years 2014, 2015, 2016, 2017 and 2018

Legislative history
- Introduced in the House as H.R. 301 by Rep. Frank R. Wolf (R, VA-10) on January 15, 2013; Committee consideration by United States House Committee on Foreign Affairs, United States House Foreign Affairs Subcommittee on Africa, Global Health, Global Human Rights and International Organizations, United States House Foreign Affairs Subcommittee on Asia and the Pacific, United States House Foreign Affairs Subcommittee on the Middle East and North Africa

H.R. 301, long title: "To provide for the establishment of the Special Envoy to Promote Religious Freedom of Religious Minorities in the Near East and South Central Asia," is a bill that was introduced in the United States House of Representatives during the 113th United States Congress. The bill would direct the President to appoint a Special Envoy to Promote Religious Freedom of Religious Minorities in the Near East and South Central Asia within the Department of State. The Special Envoy's duties would include promoting religious freedom, monitoring religious intolerance, and denouncing rights violations.

== Provisions of the bill ==
This summary is based largely on the summary provided by the Congressional Research Service, a public domain source.

H.R. 301 would direct the President to appoint a Special Envoy to Promote Religious Freedom of Religious Minorities in the Near East and South Central Asia within the Department of State. The bill would require the newly appointed Special Envoy to:

(1) promote the right of religious freedom of religious minorities in the countries of the Near East and South Central Asia, denounce the violation of such right, and recommend appropriate U.S government responses to such violations;
(2) monitor and combat acts of religious intolerance and incitement targeted against such religious minorities;
(3) ensure that the needs of such religious minority communities are addressed, including economic and security needs directly tied to religious-based discrimination and persecution;
(4) work with foreign governments of such countries to address inherently discriminatory laws; and
(5) coordinate and assist in the preparation of specified reports required by the Foreign Assistance Act of 1961 and the International Religious Freedom Act of 1998.

The bill would authorize the Special Envoy, subject to direction by the President and the Secretary of State, to represent the United States in matters and cases relevant to religious freedom in: (1) contacts with foreign governments, intergovernmental organizations, and specialized agencies of the United Nations (U.N.), the Organization of Security and Cooperation in Europe, and other international organizations; and (2) multilateral conferences and meetings relevant to religious freedom.

The bill then would require the Special Envoy to give priority to programs, projects, and activities for Egypt, Iran, Iraq, Afghanistan, and Pakistan.

Finally, the bill declares that this Act shall cease to be effective on October 1, 2018.

== Procedural history ==
=== House ===
H.R. 301 was introduced into the House on January 15, 2013 by Rep. Frank R. Wolf (R, VA-10). It was referred to the United States House Committee on Foreign Affairs, the United States House Foreign Affairs Subcommittee on Africa, Global Health, Global Human Rights and International Organizations, the United States House Foreign Affairs Subcommittee on Asia and the Pacific, and the United States House Foreign Affairs Subcommittee on the Middle East and North Africa. The House Majority Leader Eric Cantor placed the bill on the House Schedule on September 13, 2013 for consideration under a suspension of the rules on September 17.

== Debate and discussion ==
Some of the support for the bill came from Christian groups, such as Christians United for Israel, who believe that having a Special Envoy would be a valuable tool for the United States to use in addressing issues like the targeted deaths of Christians in Egypt.

Senator Roy Blunt (R-MO), speaking in favor of the Senate version of the bill, argued that passing the bill "would call attention to all religious minorities and demonstrate to leaders in the region that the United States takes religious freedom seriously."

A similar position was proposed in legislation during the 112th United States Congress. At that time, the State Department considered it duplicative of work they were already doing.

== See also ==
- List of bills in the 113th United States Congress
- United States Department of State
- Freedom of religion
