= Fifth column =

Group of people who undermine a larger group from within

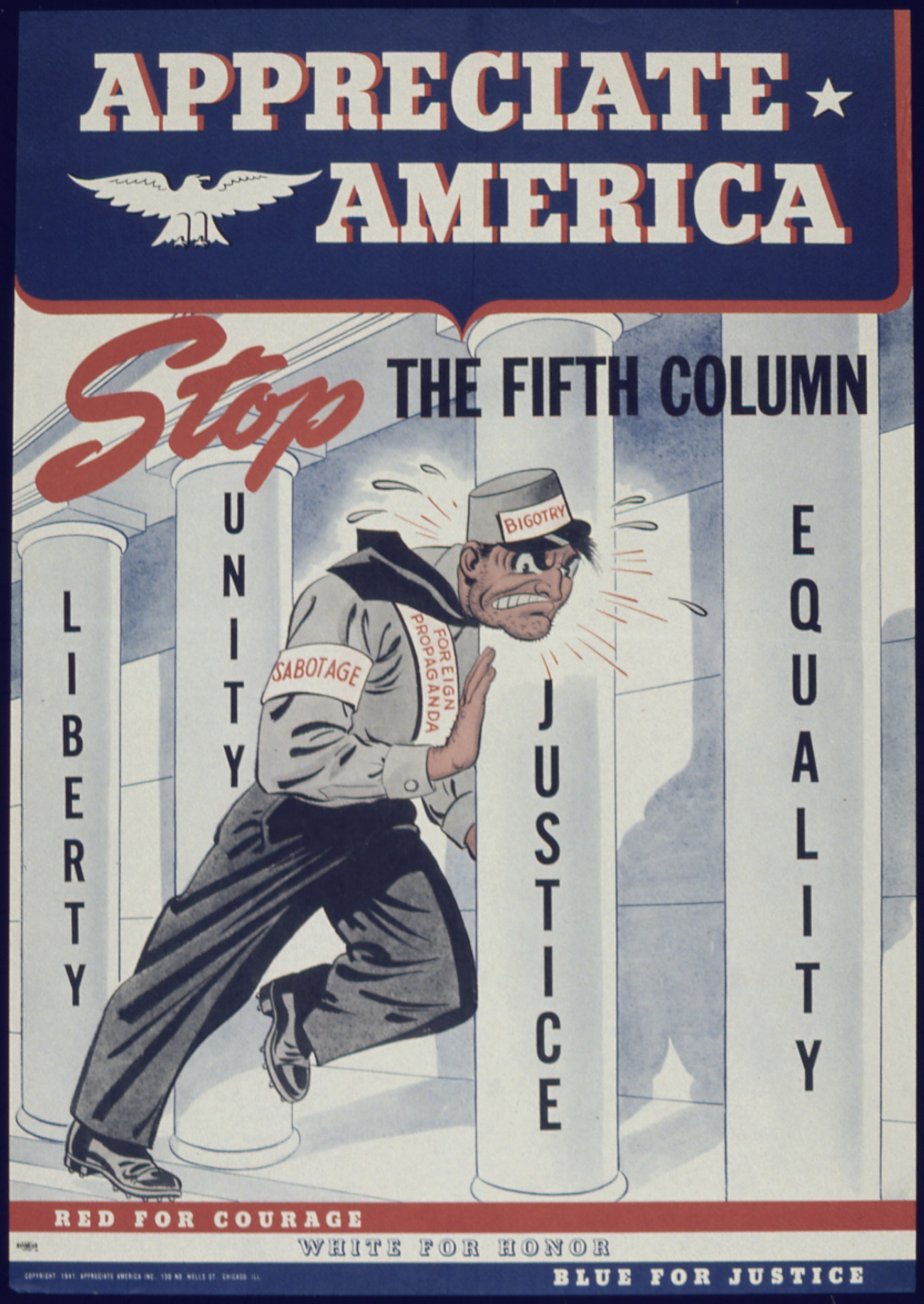
1941 World War II poster from the United States denouncing fifth columnists

A fifth column (or internal enemy) is a group of people who undermine a larger group or nation from within, usually in favor of an enemy group or another nation. The activities of a fifth column can be overt or clandestine. Forces gathered in secret can mobilize openly to assist an external attack. The term is also applied to organized actions by military personnel. Clandestine fifth column activities can involve acts of sabotage, disinformation, espionage or terrorism executed within defense lines by secret sympathizers with an external force.

== History ==
=== Origin ===
The term fifth column originated in Spain (originally quinta columna) during the early phase of the Spanish Civil War. It gained popularity in the Republican media in early October 1936 and immediately started to spread abroad.

The term appeared in a secret telegram dated 30 September 1936, that was sent to Berlin by the German chargé d'affaires in Alicante, Hans Hermann Völckers. In the telegram, he referred to an unidentified "supposed statement by Franco" that "is being circulated" (apparently in the Republican zone or in the Republican-held Levantine zone). This "supposed statement" held that Franco had claimed that there were four Nationalist columns approaching Madrid, and a fifth column waiting to attack from the inside. The telegram was part of the secret German diplomatic correspondence and was discovered long after the civil war.

The first identified public use of the term during the Spanish Civil War is in the 3 October 1936 issue of the Madrid Communist daily Mundo Obrero. In a front-page article, the party propagandist Dolores Ibárruri referred to a statement very similar (or identical) to the one that Völckers had referred to in his telegram, but attributed it to General Emilio Mola rather than to Franco. On the same day, the PCE activist Domingo Girón made a similar claim during a public rally. During the next few days, various Republican papers repeated the story, but with differing detail; some attributed the phrase to General Queipo de Llano, while later some Soviet propagandists would claim it was coined by José Enrique Varela. By mid-October, the media was already warning of the "famous fifth column".

Historians have never identified the original statement referred to by Völckers, Ibárruri, Girón, de Jong, and others. The transcripts of Francisco Franco's, Gonzalo Queipo de Llano's, and Emilio Mola's radio addresses have been published, but they do not contain the term, and no other original statement containing this phrase has ever surfaced. Australian journalist Noel Monks, who took part in Mola's press conference on 28 October 1936, claimed that Mola referred to quinta columna on that day, but by that time the term had already been in use in the Republican press for more than three weeks.

Historiographic works offer differing perspectives on authorship of the term. Many scholars have no doubt about Mola's role and refer to "fifth column" as "a term coined in 1936 by General Emilio Mola", though they acknowledge that his exact statement cannot be verified. In some sources, Mola is named as a person who had used the term during an impromptu press interview, and different—though detailed—versions of the exchange are offered. Probably the most popular version describes the theory of Mola's authorship with a grade of doubt, either noting that it is presumed but has never been proven, or that the phrase "is attributed" to Mola, who "apparently claimed" so, or else noting that "la famosa quinta columna a la que parece que se había referido el general Mola" (the famous fifth column that General Mola seems to have referred to).

=== Second World War ===
The notion of a fifth column caught the popular imagination of the public across Europe at the start of the Second World War, especially when people were faced with the rapid occupation of Norway and Denmark by the Nazis, and then the collapse of Belgium, France and the Netherlands. The fear of betrayal was heightened by the rapid fall of France in 1940, which some blamed on internal weakness and a pro-German fifth column. Reports of treachery were common, and when the French premier Paul Reynaud announced that "the bridges over the Meuse had been betrayed", a BBC employee wrote, "I have no doubt that German thoroughness has succeeded in planting a fifth column at vulnerable points." On 23 May 1940, the month after Germany invaded France, the British government under newly appointed prime minister Winston Churchill banned the British Union of Fascists under the Treachery Act 1940. In a speech to the House of Commons on 4 June, Churchill reassured MPs that "Parliament has given us the powers to put down Fifth Column activities with a strong hand." In the United States, a series of photos run in the June 1940 issue of Life magazine warned of "signs of Nazi Fifth Column Everywhere". In July 1940, Time magazine referred to talk of a fifth column as a "national phenomenon".

In August 1940, The New York Times mentioned "the first spasm of fear engendered by the success of fifth columns in less fortunate countries". One report identified participants in Nazi "fifth columns" as "partisans of authoritarian government everywhere", citing Poland, Czechoslovakia, Norway, and the Netherlands. During the Nazi invasion of Norway, the head of the Norwegian fascist party, Vidkun Quisling, proclaimed the formation of a new fascist government in control of Norway, with himself as Prime Minister, by the end of the first day of fighting. The word "quisling" soon became a byword for "collaborator" or "traitor".

The New York Times on 11 August 1940, featured three editorial cartoons using the term. John Langdon-Davies, a British journalist who covered the Spanish Civil War, wrote an account called The Fifth Column which was published the same year. In November 1940, Ralph Thomson, reviewing Harold Lavine's Fifth Column in America, a study of Communist and fascist groups in the US, in The New York Times, questioned his choice of that title: "the phrase has been worked so hard that it no longer means much of anything".

In Brazil, the term "Fifth Column" was used to accuse descendants of Germans of being supporters of the Nazi government. This was within a context of repression, in which speaking German was prohibited and its speakers were identified as "fifth columnists".

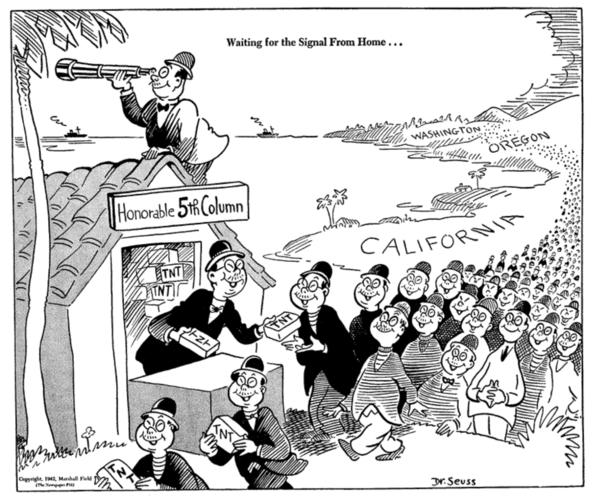
Dr. Seuss cartoon in PM dated 13 February 1942, with the caption "Waiting for the Signal from Home", depicting Japanese Americans in a racist way. Suspicion towards Japanese Americans as fifth column led to the general internment of Japanese Americans.

Immediately following the Japanese attack on Pearl Harbor, US Secretary of the Navy Frank Knox issued a statement that "the most effective Fifth Column work of the entire war was done in Hawaii with the exception of Norway". In a column published in The Washington Post, dated 12 February 1942, the columnist Walter Lippmann wrote of imminent danger from actions that might be taken by Japanese Americans. Titled "The Fifth Column on the Coast", he wrote of possible attacks that could be made along the West Coast of the United States that would amplify damage inflicted by a potential attack by Japanese naval and air forces. Suspicion about an active fifth column on the coast led eventually to the internment of Japanese Americans.

During the Japanese invasion of the Philippines, an article in the Pittsburgh Post-Gazette in December 1941 said the indigenous Moro Muslims were "capable of dealing with Japanese fifth columnists and invaders alike". Another in the Vancouver Sun the following month alleged that the large population of Japanese immigrants in Davao in the Philippines welcomed the invasion: "the first assault on Davao was aided by numbers of Fifth Columnists–residents of the town". However, postwar analysis of both Japanese and American military records, including the interrogation of surviving Japanese officers, fail to support the claims of a Japanese fifth column existing in the Philippines prior to the outbreak of hostilities.

=== Later usage ===
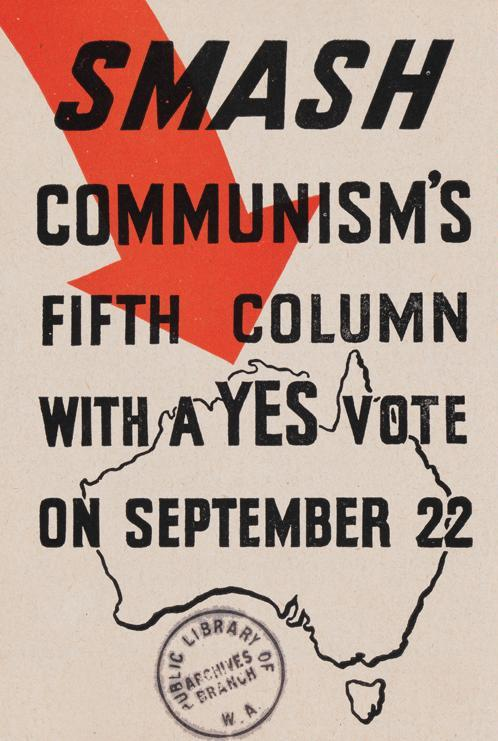
Australian Prime Minister Menzies proposed a federal referendum on 22 September 1951 asking voters to give the Commonwealth Government the power to make laws regarding communists and communism.

- During the Hamidian era of Turkey as well as during the Armenian Genocide, Ottoman bureaucratic correspondence portrayed Armenians as security threats using labels such as "vagrant", "anarchist", fesad or müfsid ("villain" or "evildoer"), and şaki ("bandit"), while by 1915 the Young Turk press was describing Armenians as "internal enemies" and traitors allegedly allied with Russia and the Entente. Although "fifth column" was not contemporary terminology, modern historians frequently employ it retrospectively to characterize this portrayal of Armenians by the Ottomans. Certain historians have also noted a contradiction in these accusations, as the Ottoman government had itself unsuccessfully attempted to recruit the Armenian Revolutionary Federation to operate as a fifth column behind Russian lines.
- German minority organizations in Czechoslovakia formed the Sudeten German Free Corps, which aided Nazi Germany. Some claimed they were "self-defense formations" created in the aftermath of World War I and unrelated to the German invasion two decades later. More often their origins were discounted and they were defined by the role they played in 1938–39: "The same pattern was repeated in Czechoslovakia. Henlein's Free Corps played in that country the part of fifth column".
- The United Front Work Department has been used by the Chinese government to influence elite individuals and organizations especially among Taiwanese and overseas Chinese communities around the world. UFWD has been accused of promoting pro-unification sentiment in Taiwan as well as election interference in some countries. In September 2024, Linda Sun, a staffer for New York governor Kathy Hochul was arrested for accusation of being a foreign agent due to her affiliation with UFWD affiliated organization that is Henan Association of Eastern America.
- In 1945, a document produced by the US Department of State compared the earlier efforts of Nazi Germany to mobilize the support of sympathizers in foreign nations to the superior efforts of the international communist movement at the end of World War II: "a communist party was in fact a fifth column as much as any [German] Bund group, except that the latter were crude and ineffective in comparison with the Communists". Arthur M. Schlesinger Jr., wrote in 1949: "the special Soviet advantage—the warhead—lies in the fifth column; and the fifth column is based on the local Communist parties".
- In 1979, Saddam Hussein, the president of Iraq, orchestrated a purge of political dissidents within the Ba'ath Party. Hussein claimed that he had uncovered a fifth column within the organization and ordered Muhyi Abdul-Hussein Mashhadi to confess his alleged involvement and that of 68 other politicians, who were promptly arrested. Twenty-two of the arrested, including Mashhadi, were executed.
- During the Revival Process in Bulgaria, the Turkish minority were viewed as a fifth column, especially after the Plovdiv railway bombing on August 30th, 1984. This was used by the Bulgarian Communist Party to further justify the renaming campaigns of 1984 and its continued violence against the Bulgarian Turks.
- Zainichi Koreans living in Japan, particularly those affiliated with the organization Chongryun (which is itself affiliated with the government of North Korea) are sometimes seen as a "fifth column" by some Japanese, and have been the victims of verbal and physical attacks. These have occurred more frequently since the government of Kim Jong Il acknowledged it had abducted Japanese citizens from Japan and tested ballistic missiles near the waters of and over mainland Japan.
- A significant number of Israeli Arabs, who compose approximately 20% of Israel's population, identify more with the Palestinian cause than with the State of Israel or Zionism. As a result, many Israeli Jews, including politicians, rabbis, journalists, and historians, view them (and/or the main Israeli Arab political group, the Joint List) as a fifth column.
- Counter-jihad literature has sometimes portrayed Western Muslims as a "fifth column", collectively seeking to destabilize Western nations' identity and values for the benefit of an international Islamic movement intent on the establishment of a caliphate in Western countries. Following the 2015 attack by French-born Muslims on the offices of Charlie Hebdo in Paris, the leader of the UK Independence Party Nigel Farage said that Europe had "a fifth column living within our own countries". In 2001, Dutch politician Pim Fortuyn talked about Muslim immigrants being a "fifth column", on the night he was dismissed as leader of Liveable Netherlands.
- In 2022, Russian president Vladimir Putin called Russian citizens who are against the Russian invasion of Ukraine as fifth columnists and "national traitors".
- Members of the American and European far-right have been widely described as fifth columnists in light of Russian interference in the 2016 United States presidential election and presidency of Donald Trump leading up to the 2022 Russian invasion of Ukraine. American conservative journalist Tucker Carlson, in particular, has faced allegations of fifth columnist behavior, especially after he decided to visit Russia and interview Vladimir Putin.
- Following the UNRWA October 7 controversy in 2024, involving claims that taxpayer funds were improperly given to the UNRWA due to family interests in Gaza during the Gaza war, Humza Yousaf, the First Minister of Scotland, revealed that he had been subjected to "smears" throughout his political life including allegations he was a "fifth columnist" because of his faith and race.
- On August 25, 2025, the official Arabic-language account for the State of Israel on X, formerly known as Twitter, cited the growing number of mosques in Europe as evidence of colonization, calling for Europe to "wake up and remove this fifth column," and tagging a large anti-Muslim account.
- Donald Trump has made repeated references to perceived internal enemies, using the phrases "the enemy from within" and "the enemy within" to refer to "the crazy lunatics that we have — the fascists, the Marxists, the communists, the people that we have that are actually running the country" in general and political opponents such as Nancy Pelosi and Adam Schiff specifically. On 30 September 2025, Trump spoke before an assembly of U.S. generals, calling for the use of the military against "the enemy within."

== In popular culture ==
The title of Ernest Hemingway's only play The Fifth Column (1938) is a translation of Emilio Mola's phrase la quinta columna. In early 1937, Hemingway had been in Madrid, reporting the war from the loyalist side, and helping make the film The Spanish Earth. He returned to the US to publicize the film and wrote the play, in the Hotel Florida in Madrid, on his next visit to Spain later that year.

In the US, an Australian radio play, The Enemy Within, proved to be very popular, though this popularity was due to the belief that the stories of fifth column activities were based on real events. In December 1940, the Australian censors had the series banned.

== See also ==
- Alien infiltration
- Black propaganda
- Copperhead (politics), US Civil War
- Deep state
- Demographic threat
- Dual loyalty
- Entryism
- False flag
- Front organization
- Irregular military
- Jash (term)
- Quisling, Norway World War II
- Sleeper cell
  - Sleeper agent
- Stab-in-the-back myth
- Stay-behind
