= Grace Meng =

American politician (born 1975)

- 孟昭文
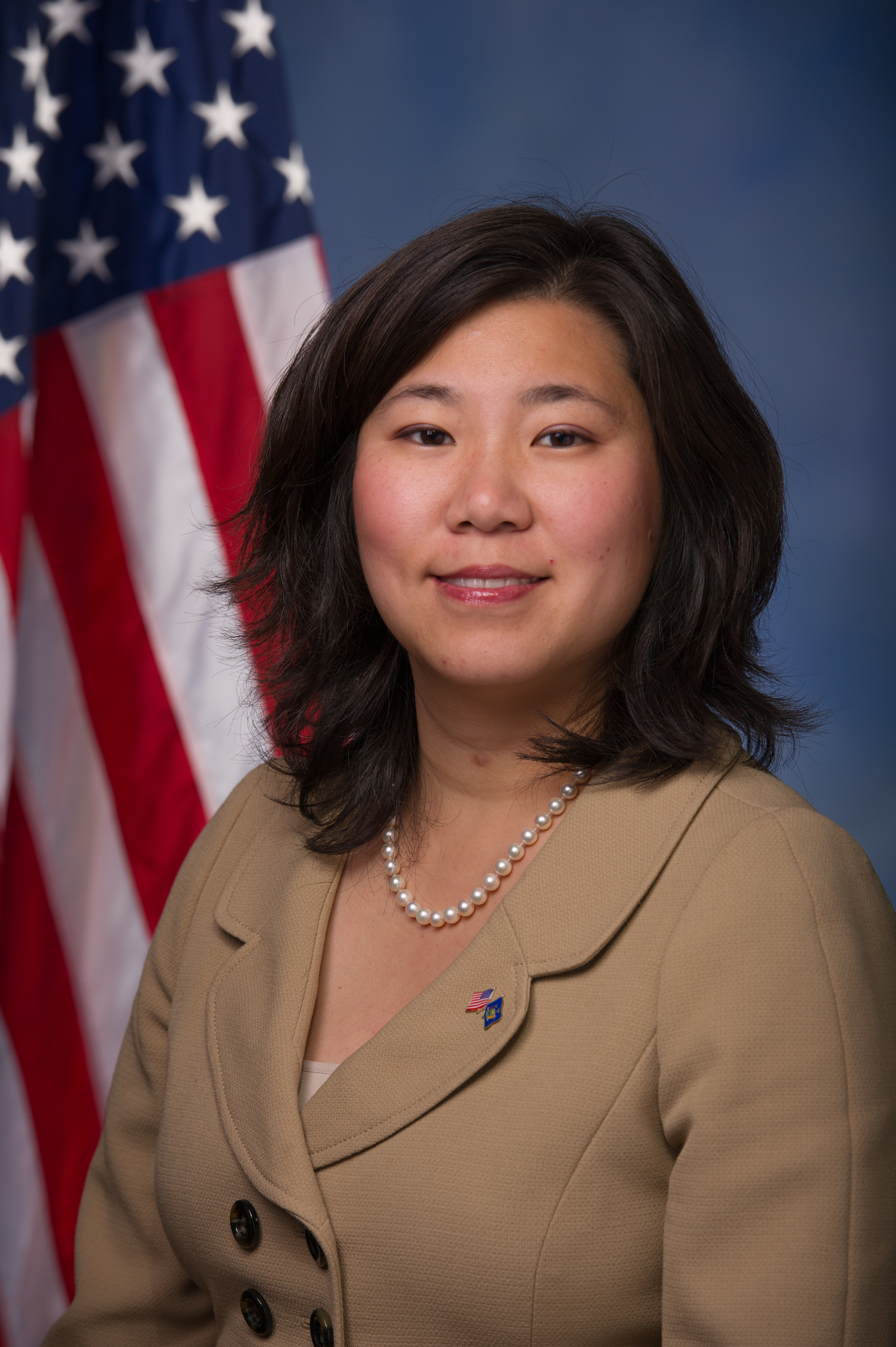
- Official portrait, 2012

Member of the U.S. House of Representatives from New York's 6th district
- Incumbent
- Assumed office January 3, 2013
- Preceded by: Gregory Meeks

Member of the New York State Assembly from the 22nd district
- In office January 1, 2009 – December 31, 2012
- Preceded by: Ellen Young
- Succeeded by: Michaelle Solages

Personal details
- Born: October 1, 1975 (age 50) New York City, New York, U.S.
- Party: Democratic
- Spouse: Wayne Kye (m. 2005)
- Children: 2
- Relatives: Jimmy Meng (father)
- Education: University of Michigan (BA); Yeshiva University (JD)
- Website: House website Campaign website

Chinese name
- Chinese: 孟昭文
Transcriptions
Standard Mandarin
- Hanyu Pinyin: Mèng Zhāowén
- Meng's voice Meng supporting a National Museum on Asian Americans and Pacific Islanders. Recorded April 26, 2022

Grace Meng (Chinese: 孟昭文; pinyin: Mèng Zhāowén; born October 1, 1975) is an American lawyer and politician serving as the U.S. representative for New York's 6th congressional district since 2013. Her district is situated within the New York City borough of Queens; it includes Bayside, East Elmhurst, Elmhurst, Flushing, Forest Hills, Fresh Meadows, Glendale, Jackson Heights, Kew Gardens, Maspeth, Middle Village, Woodside and Rego Park. A member of the Democratic Party, Meng represented the 22nd district in the New York State Assembly from 2009 until 2012. She is the first Asian American to be elected to the United States Congress from New York.

== Early life and education ==
Grace Meng was born to a Taiwanese American family on October 1, 1975, in Queens, New York. She was raised in the Bayside and Flushing sections of that borough. She is of waishengren Taiwanese descent, and is the daughter of Jimmy Meng, the first Asian to serve in the New York State Assembly, and Shiao-Mei Meng. She attended Nathaniel Hawthorne Middle School and Stuyvesant High School with the intent to become a teacher, according to a classmate. She received a Bachelor of Arts degree from the University of Michigan and a Juris Doctor from the Benjamin N. Cardozo School of Law at Yeshiva University. One of her early mentors was Susan Wu Rathbone, founder of the Queens Chinese Women's Association.

== New York Assembly ==
Meng's father, Jimmy Meng, was elected in 2004 to New York's 22nd assembly district, becoming the first Asian American to be elected to the New York State Assembly. He served one term and declined to seek reelection in 2006.

=== Elections ===
Meng ran for Assembly in 2006 to succeed her father, but was taken off the ballot when Democrat Ellen Young challenged her residency status. Young succeeded Jimmy Meng, taking office in January 2007. Jimmy Meng was arrested during an FBI sting investigation in 2012. He later pleaded guilty to wire fraud in connection with a bribery scheme.

Grace Meng's district residency issues were resolved, and she ran for Assembly again in 2008. On September 9, she defeated Young in the Democratic primary, 59%–41%. Meng's primary victory over Young "sent shock waves through the Democratic Party in Flushing". Meng went on to win the November election, defeating Young (who remained on the ballot as the nominee of the Independence Party and the Working Families Party), 87%-13%. In 2010, Meng was reelected unopposed.

=== Tenure ===
Meng was the author of the Reverse Mortgage Act of 2009 that prohibited proceeds received from reverse mortgages from being considered as income, so senior citizens can get their partial property tax exemption. Seven other of her pieces of legislation were signed into law.

In 2009, Meng was named one of City & State's "New York City Rising Stars: 40 Under 40".

==== Linda Sun ====
During Meng's time as a member of the New York Assembly, Linda Sun worked as a member of her staff. In 2024, Sun was arrested and charged with several federal felony violations for acting as an unregistered agent of the People's Republic of China. Meng was not charged with any wrongdoing. In response to Sun's arrest, Meng commented, "Like every American patriot, I am deeply, deeply concerned about the national security threat that the Chinese Communist Party's government poses to the United States, and I believe we need to protect our nation from it."

== U.S. House of Representatives ==
=== 2012 election ===
In June 2012, Meng faced fellow Assembly member Rory Lancman and New York City Council member Elizabeth Crowley in a primary election for New York's 6th congressional district and won. She received the endorsement of the Queens County Democratic Party, and a New York Times reporter wrote that she was "poised to become the biggest political star from New York City's fastest-growing demographic group." Meng said her focus would be to create jobs, improve transportation, and grow tourism opportunities in her borough. Like her father, she garnered local community support from the Henan Association of Eastern America, a local Henan hometown association co-founded by Meng's grandmother.

Meng's father, Jimmy Meng, was arrested during an FBI sting investigation in 2012. He later pleaded guilty to wire fraud in connection with a bribery scheme.

On November 6, 2012, Grace Meng defeated Republican New York City Councilmember Dan Halloran, making her the first Asian American elected to Congress from New York.

=== Re-election bids ===
In 2014, 2016, and 2018, Meng retained her seat without a Democratic primary challenger. In 2020, she faced two primary challengers, winning with 65% of the vote, and went on to defeat a Republican in the general election. She was unopposed in the primary in 2022 and 2024. In 2026, Chuck Park challenged her in the Democratic primary, which Meng won with 57% of the vote.

=== Tenure ===
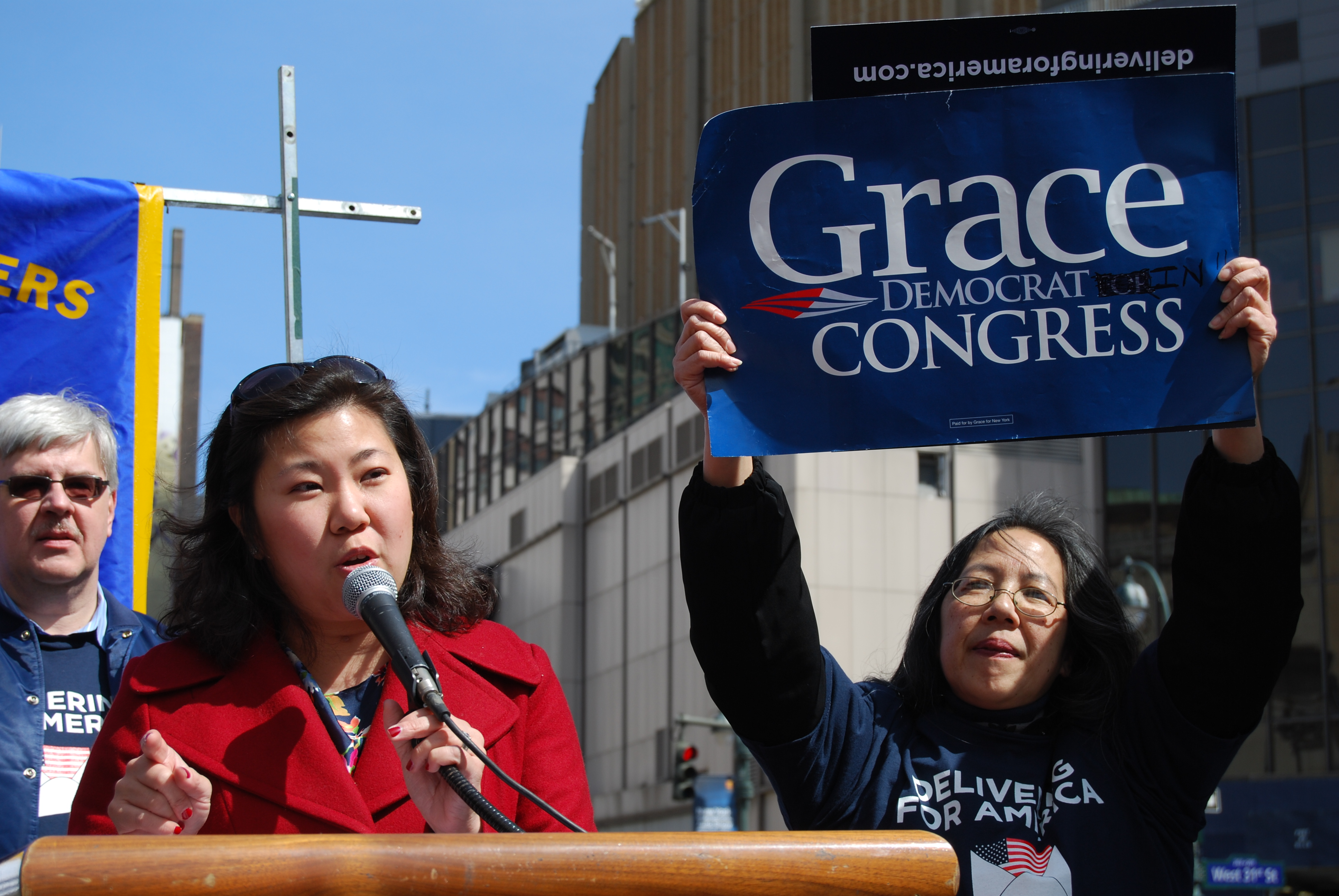
Meng speaking at a rally in March 2013

Inaugurated on January 3, 2013, Meng helped form the Bipartisan Freshman Caucus, asserting that "the American people are just sick and tired of blaming each other without getting anything done."

Her district includes the Queens neighborhoods of Auburndale, Bayside, Briarwood, Elmhurst, Flushing, Forest Hills, Fresh Meadows, Glendale, Kew Gardens, Kew Gardens Hills, Maspeth, Middle Village, and Rego Park.

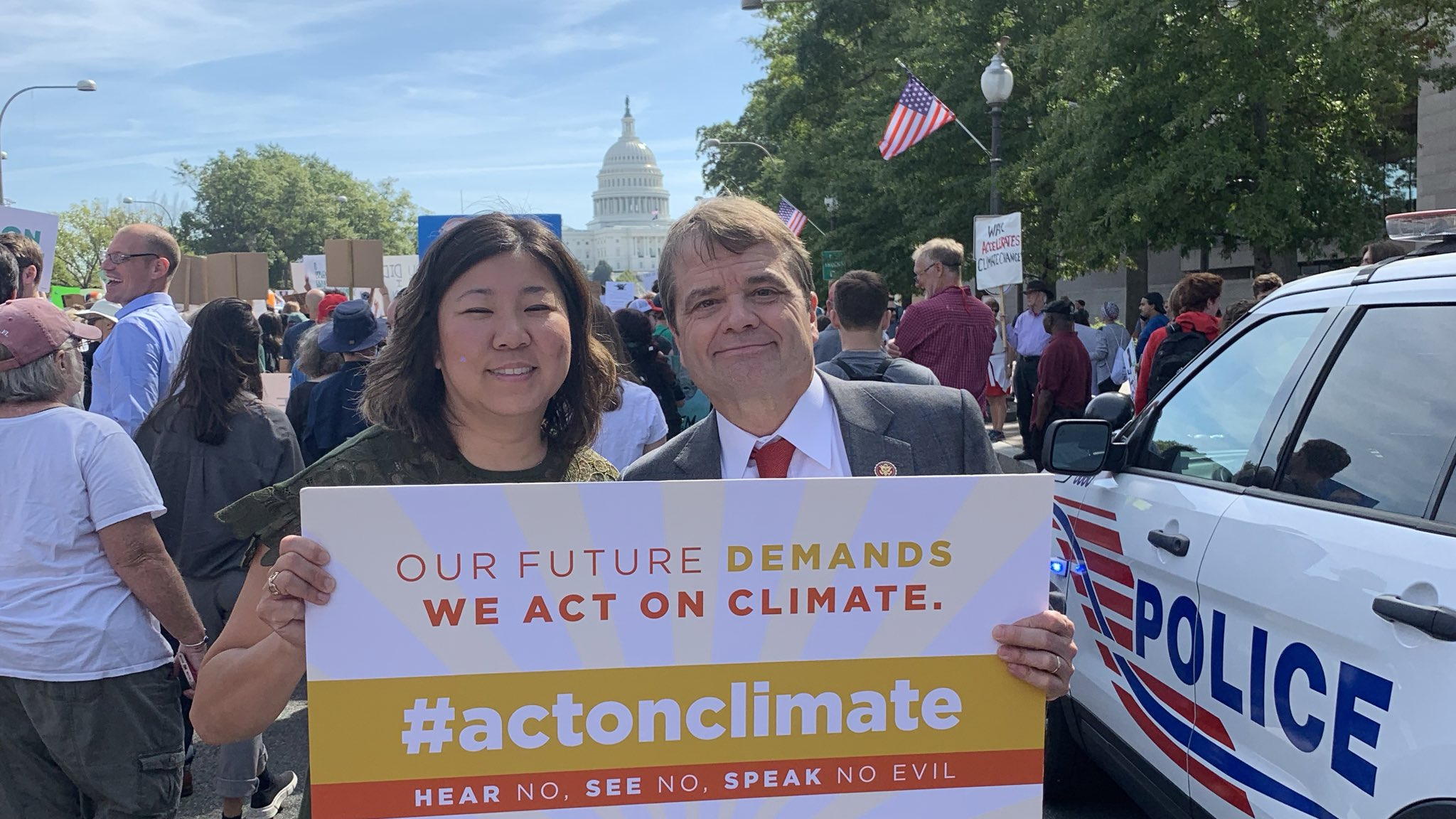
Meng with fellow Representative Mike Quigley at a 2019 Climate Strike.

On February 10, 2014, Meng introduced the Protect Cemeteries Act into the House. The bill amends the findings of the International Religious Freedom Act of 1998 by including the desecration of cemeteries among the various violations of the right to religious freedom. Meng said that "this legislation would be a new and important tool in our fight against the desecration of cemeteries" because it would "combat religiously-motivated vandalism of cemeteries and also prevent developers from building over cemeteries, a new and emerging threat in places where there are no Jewish communities left to protect burial grounds."

In January 2017, Meng boycotted Donald Trump's inauguration. In February 2017 she became Vice Chair of the Democratic National Committee (DNC) in Atlanta.

In July 2019, Meng reintroduced the Community College Student Success Act to improve graduation rates at under-resourced public community colleges to have the necessary funding to develop and implement support services for their low-income and minority students. It replicates nationwide the success of the CUNY Accelerated Study in Associate Programs which helps students earn associate degrees within 3 years by offering a range of financial, academic, and personal assistance. The program has been found to double the graduation rates of participants.

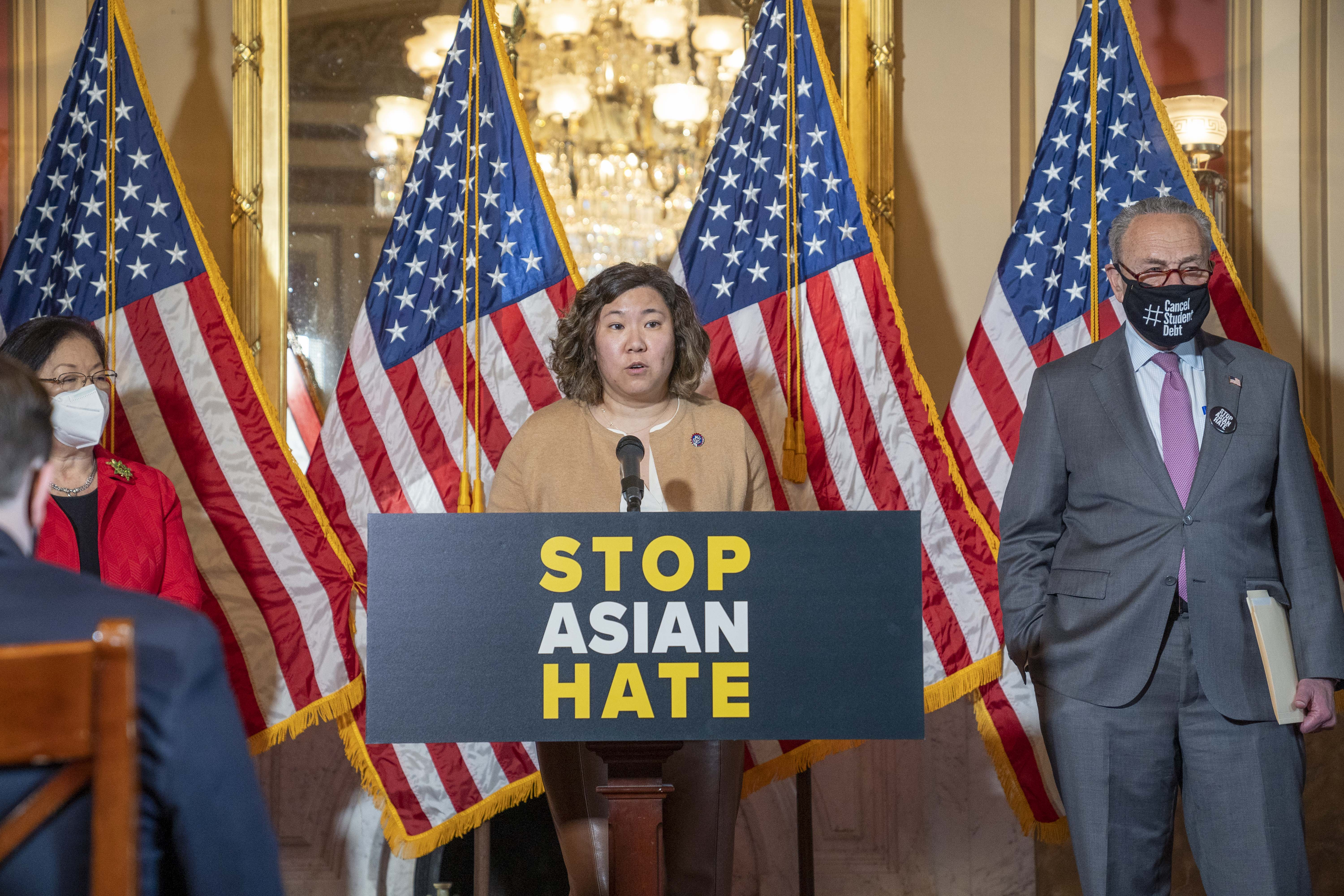
Meng and Senate Majority Leader Chuck Schumer on April 13, 2021

On February 23, 2021, Meng introduced House Resolution 151, "Condemning all forms of anti-Asian sentiment as related to COVID-19," responding to the growth of hate crimes against Asian-Americans, in the wake of Trump's repeated characterization of COVID-19 as "Kung Flu" and the "Chinese virus". It urged education and reporting about harassment. It drew initial support from 140 co-sponsors, and by March 3, 46 more, all Democrats.

Meng voted with President Joe Biden's stated position 100% of the time in the 117th Congress, according to a FiveThirtyEight analysis.

She was among the 46 Democrats who voted against final passage of the Fiscal Responsibility Act of 2023 in the House.

Meng voted in favor of three military aid package supplementals for Ukraine, Israel, and Taiwan respectively in April 2024, along with most Democrats.

Meng has accepted campaign contributions from AIPAC, which was the top contributor to her 2023-2024 re-election campaign. She traveled to Israel as part of an American Israel Education Foundation-funded Congressional delegation in 2013, and spoke at AIPAC's annual policy conference in 2018.

==== Abortion ====
Meng was given a 100% rating from NARAL Pro-Choice America for 2021, as well as for 2024.

==== Consumer protection ====
Meng introduced the Menstrual Products Right to Know Act of 2019, which would require manufacturers of menstrual products to label their ingredients and components. In response to an "epidemic" of mail theft, Meng asked the U.S. Postal Service to investigate; USPS found deficiencies in its operations and began work to mitigate them.

==== Iran ====
In 2015, Meng opposed the Iran Nuclear Deal, the Joint Comprehensive Plan of Action supported by President Obama and Secretary of State John Kerry. A press release issued by Meng stated that she didn't support immediate sanctions relief, and believed that the inspections procedure laid out in the deal were flawed. She called for a new deal to be negotiated. In 2023, Meng said she had been dismayed when President Trump withdrew from the deal, as "I thought that reflected poorly on the credibility of our country."

==== Syria ====
In 2023, Meng was among 56 Democrats to vote in favor of H.Con.Res. 21, which directed President Joe Biden to remove U.S. troops from Syria within 180 days.

==== Gaza Strip famine ====
In January 2024, Meng said that she supported "humanitarian pauses and increased humanitarian aid in Gaza." She co-signed a letter urging Secretary of State Blinken to call on Hamas to surrender, rather than call for a ceasefire. In July 2025, Meng said in a statement about the famine caused by the Israeli blockade of the Gaza Strip: "It is important to recognize that Israel has facilitated the entry of over 1.8 million tons and over 96,000 trucks into Gaza, while Hamas continues to hold hostages, extort the aid system, and refuse ceasefire deals to stay in power and prolong the war."

==== Department of Homeland Security ====
In July 2025, Meng introduced a resolution to require ICE agents and officers to display badge numbers. In January 2026, Meng cosponsored a resolution to impeach Homeland Security secretary Kristi Noem. Meng does not aim to abolish ICE, saying that addressing problems with accountability, transparency, and safety requires more than a "two-word slogan".

=== Committee assignments ===
For the 119th Congress:

- Committee on Appropriations
  - Subcommittee on Commerce, Justice, Science, and Related Agencies (Ranking Member)
  - Subcommittee on National Security, Department of State, and Related Programs

=== Caucus memberships ===
- Congressional Asian Pacific American Caucus (chair)
- Black Maternal Health Caucus
- Congressional Equality Caucus
- Congressional Progressive Caucus
- Future Forum
- Medicare for All Caucus
- Blue Collar Caucus
- Rare Disease Caucus
- Israel Allies Caucus

== Personal life ==
Meng married Wayne Kye (계원종, 桂源鍾), a Korean American dentist and assistant professor at NYU, in June 2005. The couple resides in Queens with their two sons, Tyler Kye (계창명, 桂昌明) and Brandon Kye (계창호, 桂昌浩). They attend a Protestant church in Forest Hills, Queens.

In November 2013, Meng was robbed and assaulted by a purse-snatcher in the Eastern Market area of Washington, D.C. She suffered injuries to her head, left knee, hand, and face, and was treated at George Washington University hospital.

== Electoral history ==
=== NY State Assembly ===
2008 New York State Assembly election results, District 22
Party	Candidate	Votes	%
Democratic	Grace Meng	14,314	87.24
Independence	Ellen Young	1,630	9.93
Working Families	Ellen Young	463	2.82
Total	Ellen Young (incumbent)	2,093	12.76
Total votes		16,407	100
Democratic hold			

2010 New York State Assembly election results, District 22
Party	Candidate	Votes	%
Democratic	Grace Meng	8,908	93.21
Working Families	Grace Meng	610	6.38
Total	Grace Meng (incumbent)	9,518	99.59
Write-in		39	0.41
Total votes		9,557	100
Democratic hold			

=== US House of Representatives ===
2012 United States House of Representatives election results, District 6
Primary election
Party	Candidate	Votes	%
Democratic	Grace Meng	14,825	52.98
Democratic	Rory Lancman	7,089	25.33
Democratic	Elizabeth Crowley	4,606	16.46
Democratic	Robert Mittman	1,462	5.22
Total votes		27,982	100
General election
Democratic	Grace Meng	107,507	65.40
Working Families	Grace Meng	3,994	2.43
Total	Grace Meng	111,501	67.83
Republican	Dan Halloran	45,993	27.98
Conservative	Dan Halloran	4,853	2.95
Total	Dan Halloran	50,846	30.93
Green	Evergreen Chou	1,913	1.16
Write-in		114	0.07
Total votes		164,374	100
Democratic hold			

2014 United States House of Representatives election results, District 6
Party	Candidate	Votes	%
Democratic	Grace Meng	49,227	87.96
Working Families	Grace Meng	6,141	10.97
Total	Grace Meng (incumbent)	55,368	98.94
Write-in		595	1.06
Total votes		55,963	100
Democratic hold			

2016 United States House of Representatives election results, District 6
Party	Candidate	Votes	%
Democratic	Grace Meng	131,463	69.40
Women's Equality	Grace Meng	5,043	2.66
Total	Grace Meng (incumbent)	136,506	72.06
Republican	Danniel Maio	43,770	23.11
Conservative	Danniel Maio	4,875	2.57
Blue Lives Matter	Danniel Maio	1,972	1.04
Total	Danniel Maio	50,617	26.72
Independent	Haris Bhatti	2,123	1.12
Write-in		187	0.10
Total votes		189,433	100
Democratic hold			

2018 United States House of Representatives election results, District 6
Party	Candidate	Votes	%
Democratic	Grace Meng	104,293	84.50
Working Families	Grace Meng	6,429	5.21
Reform	Grace Meng	924	0.75
Total	Grace Meng (incumbent)	111,646	90.46
Green	Thomas Hillgardner	11,209	9.08
Write-in		566	0.46
Total votes		123,421	100
Democratic hold			

2020 United States House of Representatives election results, District 6
Primary election
Party	Candidate	Votes	%
Democratic	Grace Meng (incumbent)	30,757	65.26
Democratic	Melquiades Gagarin	9,444	20.04
Democratic	Sandra Choi	6,756	14.34
Write-in		170	0.36
Total votes		47,127	100
General election
Democratic	Grace Meng	144,149	61.62
Working Families	Grace Meng	14,713	6.29
Total	Grace Meng (incumbent)	158,862	67.91
Republican	Thomas Zmich	67,735	28.96
Conservative	Thomas Zmich	5,231	2.24
Save Our City	Thomas Zmich	1,109	0.47
Libertarian	Thomas Zmich	754	0.32
Total	Thomas Zmich	74,829	31.99
Write-in		223	0.10
Total votes		233,914	100
Democratic hold			

2022 United States House of Representatives election results, District 6
Party	Candidate	Votes	%
Democratic	Grace Meng (incumbent)	85,049	63.89
Republican	Thomas Zmich	44,264	33.25
Conservative	Thomas Zmich	3,240	2.43
Medical Freedom Party	Thomas Zmich	431	0.32
Total	Thomas Zmich	47,935	36.01
Write-in		130	0.10
Total votes		133,114	100
Democratic hold			

2024 United States House of Representatives election results, District 6
Party	Candidate	Votes	%
Democratic	Grace Meng (incumbent)	120,205	60.50
Republican	Thomas Zmich	69,654	35.06
Conservative	Thomas Zmich	4,905	2.47
Total	Thomas Zmich	74,559	37.53
Independent	Joseph Chou	3,272	1.65
Write-in		654	0.33
Total votes		198,690	100
Democratic hold			

2026 United States House of Representatives election results, District 6
Primary election
Party	Candidate	Votes	%
Democratic	Grace Meng (incumbent)	18,134	56.85
Democratic	Chuck Park	13,674	42.87
Write-in		91	0.29
Total votes		31,899	100

== See also ==
- Chinese Americans in New York City
- List of Asian Americans and Pacific Islands Americans in the United States Congress
- Taiwanese Americans in New York City
- Women in the United States House of Representatives

U.S. House of Representatives
Preceded by Gregory Meeks	Member of the U.S. House of Representatives from New York's 6th congressional district 2013–present	Incumbent
Preceded by Judy Chu	Chair of the Congressional Asian Pacific American Caucus; 2025–present	Incumbent
U.S. order of precedence (ceremonial)
Preceded by David Joyce	United States representatives by seniority 108th	Succeeded by Scott Perry
