= Henan Association of Eastern America =

Overseas Chinese hometown association

- 美东河南同乡会
- Formation: 1973; 52 years ago
- Headquarters: Flushing, Queens, New York City
- Key people: Frank Zhang (president)
- Website: henanamerican.com

The Henan Association of Eastern America (HAEA; Chinese: 美东河南同乡会) is an overseas Chinese hometown association based in the Flushing, Queens that seeks to support Chinese participation in politics in the Eastern region of the United States. Founded in 1973, the organization is closely associated with the Chinese Communist Party-linked united front.

== Political influence ==
The organization was co-founded in 1973 by the grandmother of Grace Meng. The association credits itself with helping elect Jimmy Meng and his daughter Grace Meng, New York's first Asian-American congresswoman, in 2008, describing Meng as a "daughter of Henan". Early April 2019, two members of the association delivered a letter of appreciation from Meng to a Chinese Communist Party influence group in Henan, China. Both of the members were associates of the congresswoman.

The 2024 indictment of Linda Sun, deputy chief of staff to New York governor Kathy Hochul, alleged that Sun worked with the Henan Association to convince Hochul to visit Henan.

== See also ==
- United Front Work Department
- Tong (organization)
