= Hometown association =

Mutual aid societies of immigrants from the same city, village or region

Hometown associations (HTAs), also known as hometown societies, are social alliances that are formed among immigrants from the same city or region of origin. People from a variety of places have formed these associations in several countries, serving a range of purposes.

The total number of HTAs is difficult to measure as they fluctuate in number every year. The larger HTAs have official nonprofit statuses, such as 501(c)(3) registration within the United States, and have a board of directors and elected leaders. The majority of HTAs are small with predominantly working-class membership, limiting their activities to fundraising for ongoing programs or special needs, such as a natural disaster in the home country, and the advancement of health or educational activities and resources. Although much of the work of HTAs is socio-economic and cultural some of these groups do engage in political and civic processes.

HTAs also serve to donate money for special occasions or circumstances, such as a religious celebration or to repaint or repair a local church in either their new community or in their place of origin. The percentage of remittance (money sent by migrants to their home country) varies. Often, HTAs coordinate with local organizations within their community of origin to put projects into practice.

Because HTAs are volunteer-based groups, getting participation outside one's family ties can be a major challenge. People who migrated from common hometowns who appreciate the public goods that HTAs produce tend to believe that the collective benefit outweighs the individual cost of contributing. The challenge of confronting the cost and benefit of HTA investments results in the involvement in associations being low and sporadic. The patterns of those who participate in transnational ties tend to be more well off financially.

== History ==
A hometown association or hometown society is a society of immigrants from the same town or region. These aid organizations were established to deal with social, economic, and cultural problems, and provided a social framework for mutual assistance. Among the most common activities was the provision of insurance policies offering sick benefits and burial cost. Jewish hometown societies were known by the Yiddish term landsmanshaft. There were 20,000 landsmanshaftn in the Northeast US. In the United States multiple immigrant populations have formed HTAs such as the 3,000 Mexican HTAs, Filipino HTAs, Indian, Vietnamese, and other ethnic migrants such as Ghanaians amount to about 500.

== In the United States ==
=== Latino HTAs ===
Kinship networks focused on the Latino community first began in the early 20th century. They arose because of the increasing use of migratory labor during that period. Mexican HTAs in the United States grew out of the historical mutual aid societies and welfare organizations created in the late nineteenth and early twentieth century in order to provide health care and death benefits at a time when such services were unavailable for many immigrant groups.

Contemporary Mexican HTAs have their roots in mutual-benefit associations that were active in the first decade of the twentieth century in the agricultural areas of California. Such associations were rooted in common origins and provided a base of solidarity when newcomers faced the difficulties of social integration. Although these kinds of organizations have existed in Mexican communities since the 1950s, the numbers have expanded dramatically between 1980 and 2000. As of 2003, there were well over 600 Mexican hometown clubs and associations registered in 30 cities throughout the United States and these include cities NYC, Chicago, and Los Angeles. The Congressional Budget Office estimated that Mexicans send about $20 billion in remittances to Mexico in 2009, which makes remittances one of Mexico's top three sources of foreign exchange.

Although Mexican HTAs have the longest history and are the best-known, there has been an increase in the number of Dominican, Guatemalan, and Salvadoran hometown associations. These have been formed from the 1990s and are actively participating in the improvement of their communities of origin and of residence. Like Mexican-Americans and Dominican-Americans, Central Americans also participate in a growing number of hometown associations. There are an estimated 164 Guatemalan HTAs in the United States. Most of these have been focused on responding to the numerous natural disasters that have hit Guatemala since 1991. There are an estimated 200 Salvadoran HTAs, most of which focus on assisting a single town and hold dinners, pageants, and other events to raise funds for community-based development projects. HTAs contribution to local development is a common practice. Additionally, these efforts contribute to fostering and supporting positive ethnic-racial identities among immigrant communities in the US. For example, Bolivian HTAs have used cultural and folkloric events and practices as a way of building community and outreach to other populations.

In a time of economic crisis in the 1980s, the Dominican Republic began to focus on migrants in the U.S. as potential and sustained sources of remittances. As a result, remittances represented the a significant source of currency after tourism. In the past, Dominican HTA work in the country focused on charitable contributions and disaster relief. For instance, the Dominican HTA the Cañafisteros of Bani Foundation of Boston aids their hometown and province of Bani by provided ample resources for this community. This HTA provided $100 U.S. a month for needy families. Political incorporation of Dominican transnational communities stemmed from these efforts above. The HTA Esperanza por Colombia, which formed in the 1970s, used fundraising to provide similar projects aimed at improving infrastructure and transporting equipment for their sending community. Esperanza por Colombia contributed aide to earthquake victims in 1996.

=== Domestic affairs ===
The majority of hometown associations are relatively new and concentrated mainly in four states: California, New York, Texas, and Florida. Approximately two-thirds (63%) of Latino HTAs rely on donations. Although the total number of Latino hometown associations is unmeasured, there are about 4,000 HTAs that have received legal status in accordance with the Internal Revenue Service (IRS) during the 1990s. According to the IRS, among the HTAs that have formalized their status for tax purposes, about 62% operate on less than $25,000 per year, another 14% on $25,000–99,999, and 23% on $100,000 or more. The majority of Latino associations have an inside-view of Latino problems and possible solutions, and they have a special role in identifying community needs.

Raising money for improvements in their hometowns has long been a key organizing strategy, originally in cooperation with either the hometown church or local authorities. This took on a new character in towns like Zacatecas, Mexico where the state government began matching the funds provided by the migrants for a number of projects in the late 1980s. This funds-matching program is an example of how migrant interaction with Mexican policy produced migrant activism, bi-national migrant 'civil society' and migrant leadership networks in the 1990s. There are several elements included in the explanation of the rise and sustenance of these HTA networks, such as preexisting clique-like networks, transnational networks, and collective remittances. The preexisting network matches the experience of many rural origin-based HTAs and is consistent with the scholarship noting the relationship between collective remittances and high-migration states. There is of course the possibility for political bias given the way in which local, state, and federal power is structured and how projects are initiated and funded.

=== Foreign government influence ===
In the United States, overseas Chinese hometown associations (tongxianghui) have received attention for certain activities that may fall afoul of the Foreign Agents Registration Act in which they act as vectors for foreign governments to influence the country's politics and elections. The Department of Justice has increasingly scrutinized overseas Chinese hometown associations for united front activities. Concerns have been raised about overseas Chinese hometown associations coordinating with the Chinese consulate and making political endorsement in contravention of Internal Revenue Service (IRS) rules for the non-profits against electioneering. Concerns about Chinese hometown associations, such as the Henan Association of Eastern America, as vectors of Chinese Communist Party influence operations was specifically raised during the trial of Linda Sun. An umbrella organization of Chinese hometown associations, the United Chinese Associations of the Eastern United States, has publicly identified itself as a foreign agent for China. In April 2026, U.S. House lawmakers asked the IRS to investigate the tax-exempt status of several Chinese hometown associations due to election interference concerns.

=== Drug trafficking ===
Leaders of multiple Chinese hometown associations in New York City have been linked to illicit cannabis cultivation and trafficking in Oklahoma.

== Transnational sociopolitical influence ==
In the 2010s, policy and migration scholars have focused on HTAs as a phenomenon of that contribute to sociopolitical influences and financial gain in countries of origin. Concerning the interest of the political world is the rapidly emerging awareness of immigrant remittances and their impact on developing countries.

Due to the new political challenges that arose in the late twentieth century, the Mexican government devised methods of encouraging the non-political organization of Mexican immigrant communities. In particular, Mexico utilized its consulates and the Program for Mexican Communities Abroad (PCME), established under the Salinas administration in 1990. The Mexican government, acting through its consulates in the US and Canada, boosted the development of the PCME. The consulates have long-provided a number of important services to the immigrant population, including the consular identification card known as the Matrícula Consular.

Mexican consulates in the US increased their support of Mexican immigrant associations in the 1990s and sponsored the creation of new ones, often utilizing visits by hometown mayors (presidentes municipales) to encourage them to organize themselves. The Mexican government has persistently acted to encourage the development of the diaspora network in a manner that has set the standard for transnational cooperation. Consequently, this policy has evolved over a dozen years: from fostering the organization of hometown associations to sponsoring the creation of a continental assembly for the integration and strategic direction of the Mexican network and its linkage to the state.

HTAs have played a major role in institutionalizing programs to help serve the Mexican-American community in relation to the Mexican government, such as the creation of the Institute for Mexicans Abroad (Instituto de los Mexicanos en el Exterior, IME) in 2002. The Mexican HTAs – while powerful forces for social support in the United States, and political empowerment and philanthropy in Mexico – have had little involvement in political activity in California. Their active mobilization during the fight against California Proposition 187 was an exception to their usual mode of behavior, rather than a turning point in their orientation. Despite arguments that HTAs do not typically engage in political processes there is evidence that HTAs have participated in political and civic processes in the U.S. and in their country of origin. More recent work on this political and civic practices by HTAs has been well documented. The role of citizen and non-cititzen migrants are observable in the political and civic processes engaged in these spaces.

== Challenges ==
There are critical works written about the disparities between communities that have high influxes of migrants to the U.S. and those lacking this form of network. The HTAs that have the most money have the most bargaining power with local authorities. Many of the low-income communities do not have an international migrant members abroad that can send back remittances. Critics point to how HTA ties can be seen as less democratic given that migrant members have the most power in this relationship. Additionally, there is a complicated history of Mexican HTAs and the barriers in the planning and development of hometown projects with Mexican government officials.

== See also ==
- Landsmanshaft
- List of Chinese American associations
- Tong (organization)
