= Michaelle C. Solages =

American politician

Michaelle Solages
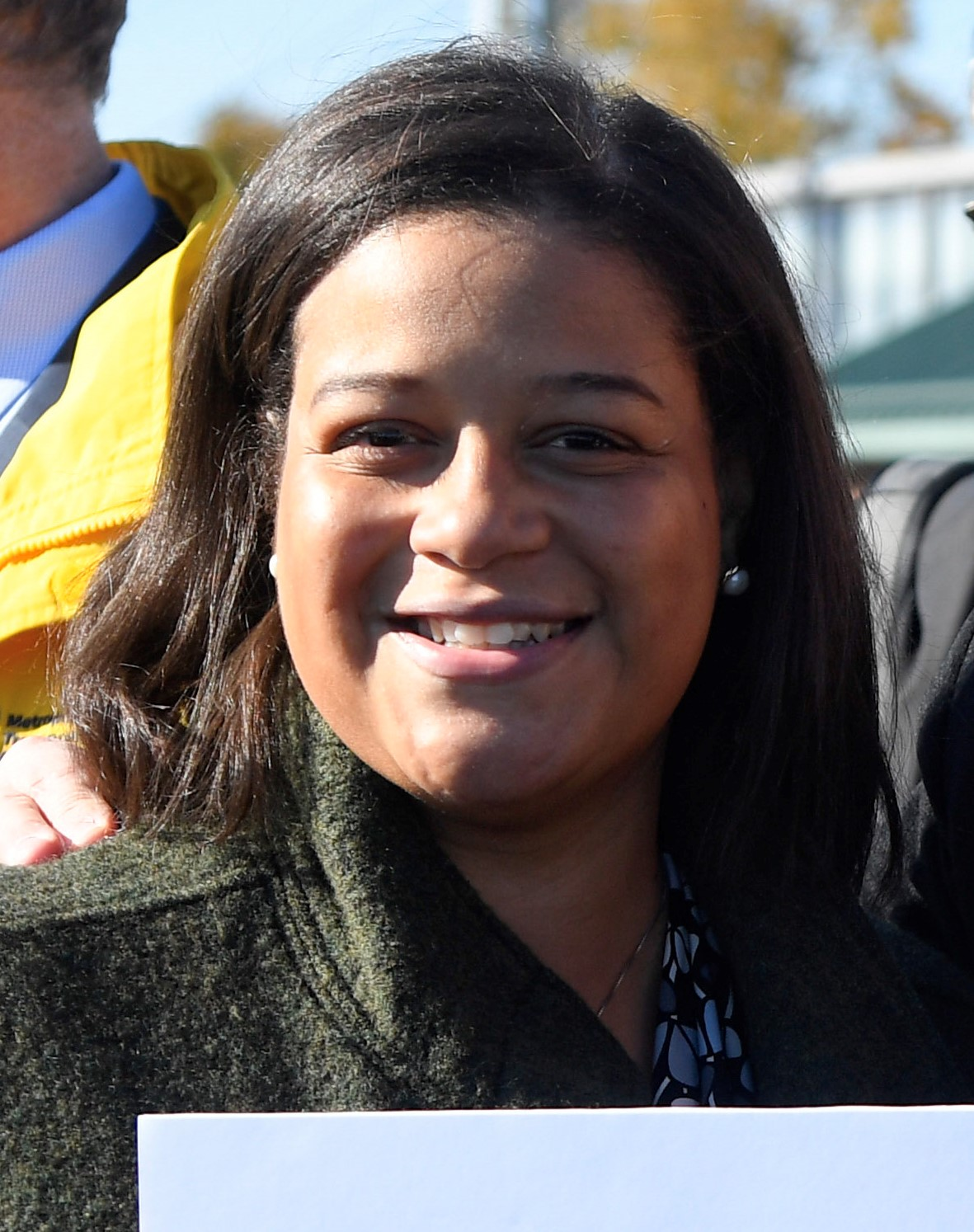
- Solages in 2021

Member of the New York State Assembly from the 22nd district
- Incumbent
- Assumed office January 1, 2013
- Preceded by: Grace Meng

Personal details
- Born: May 27, 1985 (age 41) Elmont, New York, U.S.
- Party: Democratic
- Education: Hofstra University (BS)
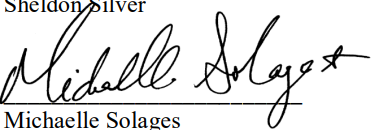
- Signature
- Website: State Assembly website

Michaelle C. Solages (born May 27, 1985) is an American politician serving as a member of the New York State Assembly, representing the 22nd district which includes portions of the town of Hempstead in Nassau County on Long Island. A Democrat, Solages was first elected in 2012.

Solages was born and raised in Elmont, New York. She graduated with a bachelor's degree from Hofstra University's School of Education, Health and Human Services. Following graduation, Solages worked as a supervisor of access services at Hofstra's Axinn Library, modernizing library resources. She also worked as a legislative aide for a time.

== Politics ==
In 2012, Solages won the Democratic nomination in the newly created 22nd district, which was drawn as a Democratic stronghold. She easily won her first election, and since then has never faced serious opposition. She is the first person of Haitian descent to be elected to the Assembly. In the Assembly, Solages serves as the Deputy Majority Leader and Chair of the Black, Puerto Rican, Hispanic, and Asian Legislative Caucus.

In 2019, Solages put forth legislation to prohibit virginity tests.

In 2025, Solages was an honoree at the 2025 McSilver Awards.

== Personal life ==
Solages resides in Elmont, New York with her family. Her brother is Nassau County Legislator Carrié Solages.
