= Susan Wu Rathbone =

Chinese-born American community leader (1921–2019)

- 吳世珊
- Susan Wu Rathbone, from a 1946 newspaper
- Born: Wu Shih-san; October 29, 1921; Hefei, Anhui, China
- Died: November 22, 2019 (aged 98); Michigan, U.S.
- Other names: Susan Rathbone; Susan W. Rathbone
- Spouse: Frank Harold Rathbone Jr. (m. 1945)
- Children: 2

Susan Wu Rathbone (Note: traditional Chinese: 吳世珊; simplified Chinese: 吴世珊; pinyin: Wú Shìshān; IPA: [wǔ ʂɻ̩̂ʂán]) (October 29, 1921 – November 22, 2019), also known as Wu Shih-san and "Auntie Wu", was a Chinese-born community leader in New York City. She was founder and head of the Chinese Immigrants Service and the Queens Chinese Women's Association, both based in Flushing, Queens.

== Early life ==
Wu Shih-san was born in 1921 (Note: Some sources give 1922 as the year.) in Hefei, Anhui, China, the daughter of Chung Liu and Jin Ban (Gung) Wu. She was a schoolteacher in Chungking as a young woman. She moved to the United States with her new husband in 1946, settling in Flushing, New York. She was believed to be the first "war bride" from China admitted to the United States after the passage of the War Brides Act in 1945.

== Career ==
Rathbone began assisting fellow immigrants from China when she established "Auntie Wu's Hotline", an advice and information service, in the 1940s. She often hosted Chinese students in her New York home, and helped Chinese immigrants begin businesses in the city. In 1984 she was founder and head of the Chinese Immigrants Service, a mutual aid society, and the Queens Chinese Women's Association, both based in Flushing. One of her protegees in the leadership of the Queens Chinese Women's Association was Grace Meng, who became a Congresswoman. Rathbone also started a bilingual magazine, Women's Voice, in 1993.

In 1984, Rathbone earned a bachelor's degree from the Queens College, City University of New York. In 1987, she received the Susan B. Anthony Award from the National Organization for Women. In a newspaper story in 2000 on local politics, she was called "Flushing's most influential Chinese activist". In 2001, she won a $5000 Emigrant Award from Emigrant Savings Bank. In 2003, she was honored by Queens borough president Helen Marshall as one of the borough's outstanding women. In 2007, the Center for the Women of New York honored Rathbone at their annual dinner.

== Personal life and legacy ==
Wu Shih-san married American soldier Frank Harold Rathbone Jr. in 1945, in Shanghai. They had two sons, Frank and Edward. She died in 2019, aged 98, at her son's home in Michigan. Her grave is with her husband's, at Jefferson Barracks National Cemetery in St. Louis, Missouri.

== See also ==
- Chinese people in New York City
- National Organization for Women
