= Country of Particular Concern =

Designation under International Religious Freedom Act

A Country of Particular Concern (CPC) is a designation by the United States Secretary of State (under authority delegated by the President) of a country responsible for particularly severe violations of religious freedom under the International Religious Freedom Act (IRFA) of 1998 (H.R. 2431) and its amendment of 1999 (Public Law 106-55). The term "particularly severe violations of religious freedom" means systematic, ongoing, egregious violations of religious freedom, including violations such as:

- a) Torture or cruel, inhuman, or degrading treatment or punishment;
- b) Prolonged detention without charges;
- c) Causing the disappearance of persons by the abduction or clandestine detention of those persons; or
- d) Other flagrant denials of the right to life, liberty, or the security of persons. Nations so designated are subject to further actions, including economic sanctions, by the United States.

== USCIRF suggestion ==
Issuing recommendations as to countries it believes should be designated as countries of particular concern for their religious liberty violations is the United States Commission on International Religious Freedom (USCIRF), a separate agency created by IRFA (along with the U.S. Department of State's Office of International Religious Freedom) to monitor the state of religious freedom around the world. Both entities provide policy recommendations to the president, the secretary of state and US Congress. Its recommendations are not always followed by the Secretary of State.

Since 2018, the USCIRF report recommended each of the following nations as a CPC:

2018	2020	2021	2022	2024
Central African Republic; China; Eritrea; Iran; Myanmar; Nigeria; North Korea; Pakistan; Russia; Saudi Arabia; Sudan; Syria; Tajikistan; Turkmenistan; Uzbekistan; Vietnam	China; Eritrea; India; Iran; Myanmar; Nigeria; North Korea; Pakistan; Russia; Saudi Arabia; Syria; Tajikistan; Turkmenistan; Vietnam	China; Eritrea; India; Iran; Myanmar; Nigeria; North Korea; Pakistan; Russia; Saudi Arabia; Syria; Tajikistan; Turkmenistan; Vietnam	Afghanistan; China; Eritrea; India; Iran; Myanmar; Nigeria; North Korea; Pakistan; Russia; Saudi Arabia; Syria; Tajikistan; Turkmenistan; Vietnam	Afghanistan; China; Cuba; Eritrea; India; Iran; Myanmar; Nicaragua; Nigeria; North Korea; Pakistan; Russia; Saudi Arabia; Syria; Tajikistan; Turkmenistan; Vietnam

These countries are considered Tier 2 countries and are on the watchlist:

2018	2020	2021	2022	2024
Afghanistan; Azerbaijan; Bahrain; Cuba; Egypt; India; Indonesia; Iraq; Kazakhstan; Laos; Malaysia; Turkey	Afghanistan; Algeria; Azerbaijan; Bahrain; Central African Republic; Cuba; Egypt; Indonesia; Iraq; Kazakhstan; Malaysia; Nicaragua	Afghanistan; Algeria; Azerbaijan; Cuba; Egypt; Indonesia; Iraq; Kazakhstan; Malaysia; Nicaragua; Turkey; Uzbekistan	Algeria; Azerbaijan; Central African Republic; Cuba; Egypt; Indonesia; Iraq; Kazakhstan; Laos; Malaysia; Nicaragua; Turkey; Uzbekistan	Algeria; Azerbaijan; Central African Republic; Egypt; Indonesia; Iraq; Kazakhstan; Malaysia; Sri Lanka; Turkey; Uzbekistan

In addition, the USCIRF designated the following non-state actors as "entities of particular concern" (EPCs):

- The Islamic State of Iraq and Syria (ISIS)
- The Taliban in Afghanistan
- Al-Shabaab in Somalia
- al-Nusra Front
- al-Qa’ida
- al-Qa’ida in the Arabian Peninsula (AQAP)
- Boko Haram
- ISIS-Khorasan

== Secretary of State announces list ==
In December 2020, the U.S. Department of State designated China, Eritrea, Iran, Myanmar, Nigeria, North Korea, Pakistan, Russia, Saudi Arabia, Syria, Tajikistan and Turkmenistan as Countries of Particular Concern and Afghanistan, the Central African Republic, Cuba, Egypt, Indonesia, Kazakhstan and Nicaragua as countries on the Watch List.

In November 2022, the U.S. Department of State designated Burma (Myanmar), China, Cuba, Eritrea, Iran, North Korea, Nicaragua, Pakistan, Russia, Saudi Arabia, Tajikistan, and Turkmenistan as Countries of Particular Concern and Algeria, the Central African Republic, Comoros, and Vietnam as countries on the Watch List. Entities of Particular Concern includes Al-Shabaab, Boko Haram, Hayat Tahrir al-Sham, the Houthis, ISIS-Sahel (formerly known as ISIS-Greater Sahara), ISIS-West Africa, Jama'at Nasr al-Islam wal Muslimin, the Taliban, and the Wagner Group based on its actions in the Central African Republic.

In December 2023, the U.S. Department of State designated Burma (Myanmar), China, Cuba, Eritrea, Iran, North Korea, Nicaragua, Pakistan, Russia, Saudi Arabia, Tajikistan, and Turkmenistan as Countries of Particular Concern and Algeria, Azerbaijan, the Central African Republic, Comoros, and Vietnam as countries on the Watch List. Entities of Particular Concern includes al-Qaeda affiliate Al-Shabaab, Boko Haram, Hayat Tahrir al-Sham, the Houthis, ISIS-Sahel (formerly known as ISIS-Greater Sahara), ISIS-West Africa, al-Qaeda affiliate Jamaat Nasr al-Islam wal Muslimin, and the Taliban.
