= New York's 22nd State Assembly district =

American legislative district

Assemblymember
Michaelle Solages; D–Elmont

New York's 22nd State Assembly district is one of the 150 districts in the New York State Assembly. It has been represented by Michaelle Solages since 2013, succeeding Grace Meng.

== Geography ==
=== 2020s ===
District 22 is in Nassau County. It contains portions of the town of Hempstead, and the villages of North Valley Stream, Elmont, South Valley Stream, South Floral Park, Floral Park, Bellerose, Bellerose Terrace, North Woodmere, Stewart Manor, and sections of Franklin Square and Valley Stream.

The 22nd district is entirely within New York's 4th congressional district, and entirely within New York's 9th State Senate district.

=== 2010s ===
District 22 is in Nassau County. It contains portions of the town of Hempstead, and the villages of Valley Stream, North Valley Stream, Elmont, South Valley Stream, South Floral Park, Floral Park, Bellerose, Bellerose Terrace, North Woodmere, Stewart Manor, and sections of Franklin Square.

== Recent election results ==
=== 2026 ===
2026 New York State Assembly election, District 22
Party	Candidate	Votes	%
Democratic	Michaelle Solages		
Working Families	Michaelle Solages		
Total	Michaelle Solages (incumbent)		
Republican	Robert Inzerillo		
Conservative	Robert Inzerillo		
Total	Robert Inzerillo		
Write-in			
Total votes			

=== 2024 ===
2024 New York State Assembly election, District 22
Party	Candidate	Votes	%
Democratic	Michaelle Solages	35,462	
Working Families	Michaelle Solages	1,079	
Total	Michaelle Solages (incumbent)	36,541	62.0
Republican	Ian Bergstrom	20,385	
Conservative	Ian Bergstrom	1,819	
Total	Ian Bergstrom	22,204	37.7
Write-in		227	0.3
Total votes		58,972	100.0
Democratic hold			

=== 2022 ===
2022 New York State Assembly election, District 22
Party	Candidate	Votes	%
Democratic	Michaelle Solages	22,129	
Working Families	Michaelle Solages	781	
Total	Michaelle Solages (incumbent)	22,910	57.9
Republican	Cara Castronuova	15,236	
Conservative	Cara Castronuova	1,446	
Total	Cara Castronuova	16,682	42.1
Write-in		17	0.0
Total votes		39,609	100.0
Democratic hold			

=== 2020 ===
2020 New York State Assembly election, District 22
Party	Candidate	Votes	%
Democratic	Michaelle Solages	40,650	
Working Families	Michaelle Solages	1,189	
Independence	Michaelle Solages	513	
Total	Michaelle Solages (incumbent)	42,352	68.0
Republican	Nicholas Zacchea	18,078	
Conservative	Nicholas Zacchea	1,853	
Total	Nicholas Zacchea	19,931	32.0
Write-in		18	0.0
Total votes		62,301	100.0
Democratic hold			

=== 2018 ===
2018 New York State Assembly election, District 22
Party	Candidate	Votes	%
Democratic	Michaelle Solages	30,625	
Working Families	Michaelle Solages	506	
Independence	Michaelle Solages	375	
Women's Equality	Michaelle Solages	219	
Reform	Michaelle Solages	56	
Total	Michaelle Solages (incumbent)	31,781	69.8
Republican	Gonald Moncion	12,377	
Conservative	Gonald Moncion	1,350	
Total	Gonald Moncion	13,727	30.2
Write-in		18	0.0
Total votes		45,526	100.0
Democratic hold			

=== 2016 ===
2016 New York State Assembly election, District 22
Party	Candidate	Votes	%
Democratic	Michaelle Solages	34,986	
Working Families	Michaelle Solages	1,017	
Independence	Michaelle Solages	562	
Women's Equality	Michaelle Solages	396	
Total	Michaelle Solages (incumbent)	36,961	66.3
Republican	Robert Bogle	16,736	
Conservative	Robert Bogle	1,822	
Reform	Robert Bogle	193	
Total	Robert Bogle	18,751	33.7
Write-in		34	0.0
Total votes		55,712	100.0
Democratic hold			

=== 2014 ===
2014 New York State Assembly election, District 22
Party	Candidate	Votes	%
Democratic	Michaelle Solages	14,315	
Working Families	Michaelle Solages	830	
Independence	Michaelle Solages	527	
Women's Equality	Michaelle Solages	305	
Total	Michaelle Solages (incumbent)	15,977	59.6
Republican	Gonald Moncion	9,396	
Conservative	Gonald Moncion	1,441	
Total	Gonald Moncion	10,837	40.4
Write-in		19	0.0
Total votes		26,833	100.0
Democratic hold			

=== 2012 ===
2012 New York State Assembly election, District 22
Party	Candidate	Votes	%
Democratic	Michaelle Solages	28,817	
Working Families	Michaelle Solages	1,388	
Total	Michaelle Solages	30,205	64.7
Republican	Sean Wright	14,069	
Conservative	Sean Wright	1,800	
Independence	Sean Wright	602	
Total	Sean Wright	16,471	35.3
Write-in		11	0.0
Total votes		46,689	100.0
Democratic win (new boundaries)			

=== 2010 ===
2010 New York State Assembly election, District 22
Party	Candidate	Votes	%
Democratic	Grace Meng	8,908	
Working Families	Grace Meng	610	
Total	Grace Meng (incumbent)	9,518	99.6
Write-in		39	0.4
Total votes		9,557	100.0
Democratic hold			

=== 2008 ===
2008 New York State Assembly District 22 Democratic Party primary
Primary election
Party	Candidate	Votes	%
Democratic	Grace Meng	2,845	58.8
Democratic	Ellen Young (incumbent)	1,991	41.2
Total votes		4,836	100.0

2008 New York State Assembly election, District 22
Party	Candidate	Votes	%
Democratic	Grace Meng	14,314	87.2
Independence	Ellen Young	1,630	
Working Families	Ellen Young	463	
Total	Ellen Young (incumbent)	2,093	12.8
Total votes		16,407	100.0
Democratic hold			

=== 2006 ===
2006 New York State Assembly District 22 Democratic Party primary
Primary election
Party	Candidate	Votes	%
Democratic	Ellen Young	1,912	35.6
Democratic	Julia Harrison	1,855	34.6
Democratic	Terence Park	1,595	
Write-In	Terence Park	6	
Total	Terence Park	1,601	29.8
Total votes		5,368	100.0

2006 New York State Assembly election, District 22
Party	Candidate	Votes	%
Democratic	Ellen Young	7,887	
Independence	Ellen Young	324	
Total	Ellen Young	8,211	78.9
Republican	Christopher Migliaccio	1,889	
Conservative	Christopher Migliaccio	311	
Total	Christopher Migliaccio	2,200	21.1
Total votes		10,411	100.0
Democratic hold			

=== 2004 ===
2004 New York State Assembly District 22 Democratic Party primary
Primary election
Party	Candidate	Votes	%
Democratic	Jimmy Meng	2,877	51.3
Democratic	Barry Grodenchik (incumbent)	2,311	41.2
Democratic	Benjamin Singer	425	7.6
Total votes		5,613	100.0

2004 New York State Assembly election, District 22
Party	Candidate	Votes	%
Democratic	Jimmy Meng	13,409	
Independence	Jimmy Meng	307	
Conservative	Jimmy Meng	302	
Total	Jimmy Meng	14,018	69.1
Republican	Meilin Tan	4,066	20.1
Working Families	Barry Grodenchik (incumbent)	1,851	9.1
Green	Evergreen Chou	338	1.7
Total votes		20,273	100.0
Democratic hold			

=== 2002 ===
2002 New York State Assembly District 22 Democratic Party primary
Primary election
Party	Candidate	Votes	%
Democratic	Barry Grodenchik	1,639	36.2
Democratic	Jimmy Meng	1,513	33.4
Democratic	Ethel Chen	1,005	22.2
Democratic	John Albert	373	8.2
Write-in		1	0.0
Total votes		4,531	100.0

2002 New York State Assembly election, District 22
Party	Candidate	Votes	%
Democratic	Barry Grodenchik	5,822	44.7
Independence	Jimmy Meng	3,192	
Conservative	Jimmy Meng	857	
Total	Jimmy Meng	4,049	31.1
Republican	Meilin Tan	2,618	20.1
Liberal	Ethel Chen	263	2.0
Green	Evergreen Chou	165	1.3
Working Families	John Albert	115	0.9
Total votes		13,032	100.0
Democratic hold			
