= Takming University of Science and Technology =

Private university in Neihu, Taipei, Taiwan

- 德明財經科技大學
- Type: Private
- Established: 1965
- President: David Shyu
- Location: Neihu, Taipei, Taiwan; 25°05′11.4″N 121°33′56.0″E
- Website: Official website

Takming University of Science and Technology
- Traditional Chinese: 德明財經科技大學
Transcriptions
Standard Mandarin
- Hanyu Pinyin: Démíng Cáijīng Kējì Dàxué
Southern Min
- Hokkien POJ: Tek-bêng Châi-keng Kho-ki Tāi-ha̍k

Takming University of Science and Technology (TMUST; Chinese: 德明財經科技大學; Pe̍h-ōe-jī: Tek-bêng Châi-keng Kho-ki Tāi-ha̍k) is a private university in Neihu District, Taipei, Taiwan.

TMUST has six colleges: the College of Engineering, the College of Business, the College of Design, the College of Humanities and Social Sciences, the College of Tourism and Hospitality, and the College of Continuing Education. Each college offers majors and programs for students to choose from, including computer science, mechanical engineering, business administration, digital media design, international tourism and hospitality management.

== History ==
The university was originally established in 1965. It was previously known as Takming College.

== Faculties ==
- College of Finance
- College of Informatics
- College of Management

== Library ==
The university library consists of more than 300,000 volumes of books, more than 1,000 journals and more than 50,000 electronic journals.

== Transportation ==
The university is accessible within walking distance North of Xihu Station of the Taipei Metro.

== Notable alumni ==
- Ellen Young, member of New York State Assembly (2006–2008)
- Miu Chu, singer

== See also ==
- List of universities in Taiwan
