= Miu Chu =

Taiwanese singer (1981–2022)

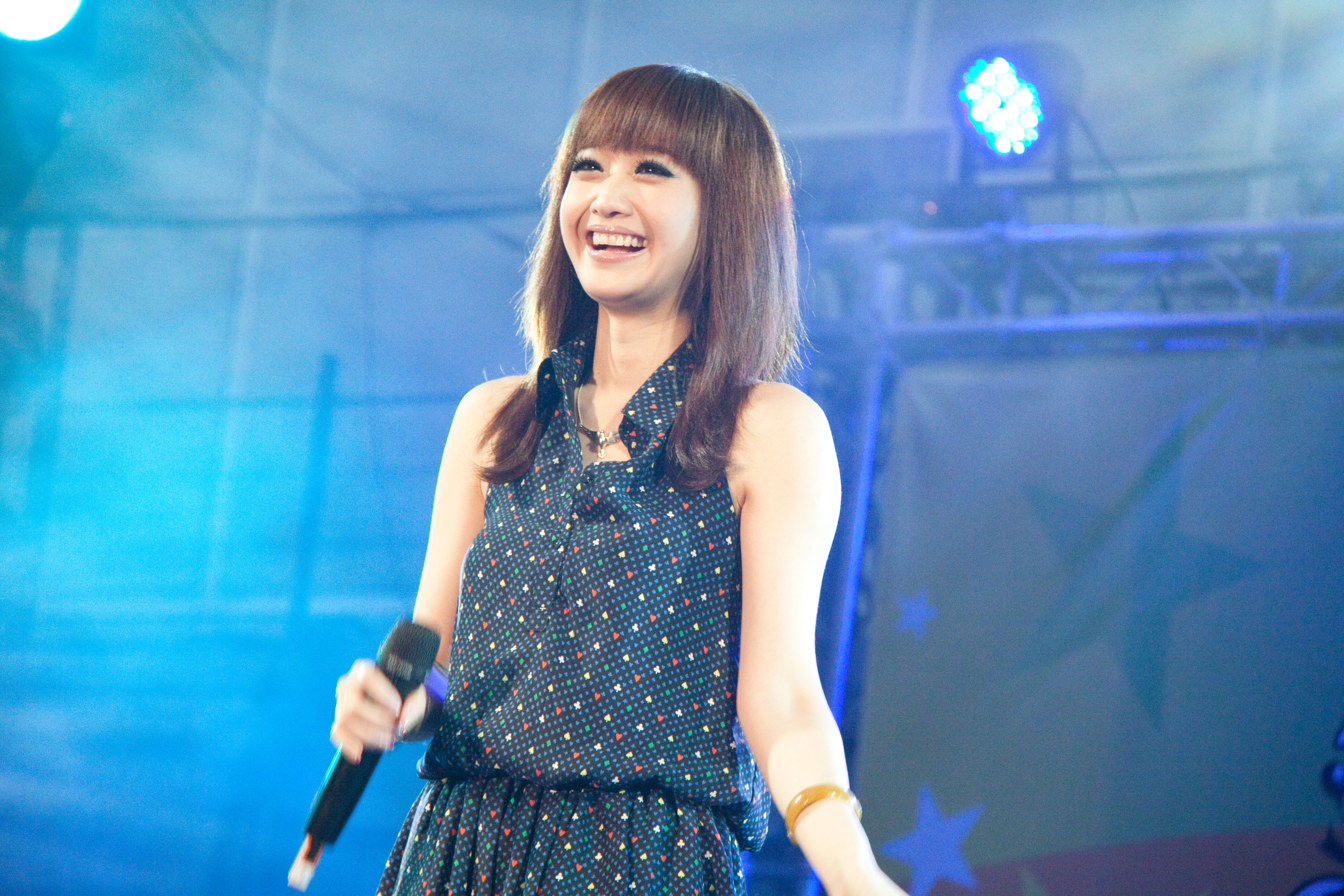
- Chu in 2010
- Born: 16 December 1981; Shilin District, Taipei, Taiwan
- Died: 3 July 2022 (aged 40)
- Education: Takming University of Science and Technology
- Occupation: Singer

Chinese name
- Traditional Chinese: 朱俐靜
- Simplified Chinese: 朱俐静
Transcriptions
Standard Mandarin
- Hanyu Pinyin: Zhū Lìjìng
- Wade–Giles: Chu Li Ching
- Musical career
- Also known as: Miu Zhu; Chu Li-ching; Zhu Li-jing
- Genres: Mandopop
- Labels: Linfair, Eagle, Kham
- Website: www.supermiu.net

Miu Chu (Chinese: 朱俐靜; Wade–Giles: Chu^{1} Li^{4}-ching^{4}; 16 December 1981 – 3 July 2022) was a Taiwanese singer. She was the winner of the third season of the Taiwanese reality television show Super Idol.

Chu performed at the Kaohsiung lantern festival in a concert on 12 February 2011. She has also performed at Legacy Taipei. On 5 January 2021, while promoting her final full-length album released in late December 2020, Chu announced she was battling breast cancer. Her family confirmed via Facebook on 3 July 2022 that Chu died at the age of 40 after a two-year battle with the disease.
