= Protect Cemeteries Act =

2014 U.S. federal law

- Long title: To amend the International Religious Freedom Act of 1998 to include the desecration of cemeteries among the many forms of violations of the right to religious freedom.
- Announced in: the 113th United States Congress
- Sponsored by: Rep. Grace Meng (D, NY-6)
- Number of co-sponsors: 0

Citations
- Public law: Pub. L. 113–154 (text) (PDF)

Codification
- U.S.C. sections affected: 22 U.S.C. § 6401

Legislative history
- Introduced in the House as H.R. 4028 by Rep. Grace Meng (D, NY-6) on February 10, 2014; Committee consideration by United States House Committee on Foreign Affairs, United States House Foreign Affairs Subcommittee on Africa, Global Health, Global Human Rights and International Organizations; Passed the House on May 28, 2014 (voice vote); Passed the Senate on July 29, 2014 (unanimous consent); Signed into law by President Barack Obama on August 8, 2014

Public Law 113-154, informally known as the Protect Cemeteries Act, is a U.S. federal law which amended the findings of the International Religious Freedom Act of 1998 by including the desecration of cemeteries among the various violations of the right to religious freedom.

The bill was introduced in the United States House of Representatives as H.R. 4028 during the 113th United States Congress. It was signed into law on August 8, 2014, by President Barack Obama.

== Background ==
The International Religious Freedom Act of 1998 (Pub. L. 105–292 (text) (PDF), as amended by Public Law 106–55, Public Law 106–113, Public Law 107–228, Public Law 108–332, and Public Law 108–458) was passed to promote religious freedom as a foreign policy of the United States, and to advocate on the behalf of the individuals viewed as persecuted in foreign countries on the account of religion. The Act was signed into law by President Bill Clinton on October 27, 1998.

In August 2012, during the 112th United States Congress, Representatives Bob Turner (R-NY-9) and Ileana Ros-Lehtinen (R-FL-18) introduced a bill with similar provisions as the Protect Cemeteries Act, but the United States House Committee on Foreign Affairs took no action on their bill.

== Provisions of the bill ==
The law amended the International Religious Freedom Act of 1998 to include the desecration of cemeteries among the forms of violations of the right to religious freedom in many countries around the world.

The text of the law contained no official short title, but it was referred to as the Protect Cemeteries Act in floor speeches as well as in media coverage.

== Congressional Budget Office report ==
The Congressional Budget Office (CBO) estimated that implementing this law would have no effect on the federal budget. Pay-as-you-go procedures did not apply to this legislation because it would not affect direct spending or revenues.

== Procedural history ==
H.R. 4028 was introduced into the United States House of Representatives on February 10, 2014, by Rep. Grace Meng (D, NY-6). It was referred to the United States House Committee on Foreign Affairs and the United States House Foreign Affairs Subcommittee on Africa, Global Health, Global Human Rights and International Organizations. On May 28, 2014, the bill passed the House in a voice vote. The United States Senate voted on July 29, 2014, to pass the bill by unanimous consent and President Barack Obama signed the bill into law on August 8, 2014.

== Debate and discussion ==
Rep. Meng, who sponsored the bill, said that "this legislation would be a new and important tool in our fight against the desecration of cemeteries" because it would "combat religiously-motivated vandalism of cemeteries and also prevent developers from building over cemeteries, a new and emerging threat in places where there are no Jewish communities left to protect burial grounds."

== See also ==
- List of bills in the 113th United States Congress
