= Ellen Young (politician) =

American politician

Ellen Young 楊愛倫

Member of the New York State Assembly from the 22nd district
- In office January 1, 2007 – December 31, 2008
- Preceded by: Jimmy Meng
- Succeeded by: Grace Meng

Personal details
- Born: 1952 (age 73–74) Taipei City, Taiwan
- Citizenship: Republic of China; United States
- Party: Democratic
- Children: Yang Huashan (楊華姍)
- Education: St. John's University (MA); Takming University of Science and Technology (BBA)

Ellen Young (Chinese: 楊愛倫; pinyin: Yáng Àilún; born 1952) is an American politician who represented the 22nd assembly district in the New York State Assembly. A Democrat, she was elected in 2006 to represent Flushing, Queens. She is currently the Chairwoman & CEO for the United Nations Peace and Development Fund.

== Early life and career ==
Young came to New York at the age of 25 from Taiwan after graduating from Takming University of Science and Technology in Taipei. After a lengthy recovery from a near-fatal bicycling accident in her Assembly District, Young was forced to direct her energy and expertise elsewhere. She enrolled at the St. John's University Institute of Asian Studies, earning her master's degree with a Certificate of Academic Excellence in 2012.

== Political career ==
Young lost in the 2008 primary for reelection to Grace Meng. The election was hotly contested as Young was supported by John Liu and Meng was supported by her father, previous Assemblyman Jimmy Meng. She became the first Asian woman elected to the New York State Legislature. She had a more substantial record than many first-term Assembly members, by passing five bills into law, including a measure to extend senior-citizen services. Therefore, Young became the first Asian American to pass a law in New York State. During her term in the New York State Legislature, Ellen obtained an 83% increase in spending for her district while the total budget of New York State was cut by 20%. She also presided over the body as speaker pro-tempore, a special honor.

Young was also appointed to the New York State Supreme Court Grievance Committee for the Second, Eleventh and Thirteenth Judicial District, serving two terms running from 2011 to 2019.

In 2021, Young ran for the New York City Council to represent the 20th district. She was defeated by Sandra Ung in the 8th round of ranked choice voting tabulations.
