= Jimmy Meng =

Chinese American former politician

- 孟廣瑞

Member of the New York State Assembly from the 22nd district
- In office January 1, 2005 – December 31, 2006
- Preceded by: Barry Grodenchik
- Succeeded by: Ellen Young

Personal details
- Born: 1944 (age 81–82) Shandong, Republic of China
- Party: Democratic
- Children: 3, including Grace

Jimmy Kuang Zui Meng (Chinese: 孟廣瑞; pinyin: Mèng Guǎngruì, born 1944) is a Chinese-born American former politician, who served as a member of the New York State Assembly. A Democrat, Meng represented the 22nd Assembly District in Flushing, Queens from 2005 to 2006. He is the first Asian American to have served in the New York State Legislature. Meng pleaded guilty to wire fraud in 2013.

== Background and family ==
Meng's ancestral home was in Shandong Province, China. His father moved to Taiwan due to the Chinese Communist Party's takeover of mainland China. After moving to the United States from Taiwan in 1975, Meng began a successful timber business. Following years of business activity, he became the president of the Flushing Chinese Business Association (FCBA).

Meng is the father of U.S. Representative Grace Meng.

== Political career ==
Meng ran for New York State Assembly in 2002 in the 22nd Assembly District in Flushing, but was defeated by Barry Grodenchik. In 2004, Meng ran for Assembly again. This time, he ousted Grodenchik in the Democratic primary. Running on the Democratic, Independence, and Conservative lines, Meng defeated Republican candidate Meilin Tan, Grodenchik (running on the Working Families Party line), and Green candidate Evergreen Chou in the general election.

Meng served in the Assembly in 2005 and 2006. He stated that he would not seek re-election in 2006 due to health concerns. He expressed a desire for more Asian Americans and other minorities to run for office. Meng was succeeded by another Asian American, Ellen Young. In turn, Young lost the September 9, 2008 Democratic primary to Jimmy Meng's daughter, Grace Meng. Grace Meng won the 2008 general election in Assembly District 22 and went on to become a member of Congress.

== Prosecution and guilty plea ==
Meng was arrested on federal charges on July 25, 2012. On November 14, 2012, he pleaded guilty to wire fraud for soliciting an $80,000 cash bribe (concealed in a fruit basket) and falsely stating that he would use the funds to bribe Manhattan prosecutors to obtain a reduced sentence for a defendant. The government found no evidence that Meng contacted anyone in the District Attorney's Office on behalf of the defendant; rather, investigators concluded that Meng intended to keep the $80,000 for himself. On March 12, 2013, Meng was sentenced to a month in jail, a fine of $30,000, three months of house arrest, and 750 hours of community service for his role in the bribery scheme.

Preceded by Barry Grodenchik	New York State Assembly, 22nd District; 2005–2006	Succeeded by Ellen Young
