= Frank R. Wolf International Religious Freedom Act =

United States legislation

- Long title: To amend the International Religious Freedom Act of 1998 to improve the ability of the United States to advance religious freedom globally through enhanced diplomacy, training, counterterrorism, and foreign assistance efforts, and through stronger and more flexible political responses to religious freedom violations and violent extremism worldwide, and for other purposes.
- Enacted by: the 114th United States Congress
- Effective: December 16, 2016

Citations
- Public law: 114-281

Legislative history
- Introduced in the House of Representatives as H.R. 1150 by Chris Smith (R–NJ) on February 27, 2015; Committee consideration by House - Foreign Affairs, Financial Services, Oversight and Government Reform; Senate - Foreign Relations; Passed the House of Representatives on May 16, 2016; Passed the Senate on December 10, 2016; Signed into law by President Barack Obama on December 16, 2016

The Frank R. Wolf International Religious Freedom Act (H.R. 1150, Pub. L. 114–281 (text) (PDF)) amended "the International Religious Freedom Act of 1998 (IRFA) to state in the congressional findings that the freedom of thought and religion is understood to protect theistic and nontheistic beliefs as well as the right not to profess or practice any religion". The bill was named after Frank Wolf, a Republican Congressman for Virginia and supporter of religious freedom, who, along with Arlen Specter, introduced the Freedom from Religious Persecution Act of 1997 in May of that year, which didn't pass in the Senate. The International Religious Freedom Act of 1998 was introduced by Senator Don Nickles on March 26, 1998, and was passed by the Senate on October 8, 1998, then passed without conference by the House on October 10, 1998. IRFA was passed as an amendment in the nature of a substitute (in its entirety, including the title) to H.R. 2431, the Freedom from Religious Persecution Act of 1997.

While both religious and non-religious groups have signaled approval for the 2016 amendment, it has received particular attention for specifically protecting nontheists and those who claim no religion at all. The Frank Wolf Act does not materially change the 1998 IRFA legislation, which already contained the authority to enact the 2016 provisions, but it spells out certain provisions in greater detail and specificity.

== History ==
The International Religious Freedom Act of 1998 was first introduced on March 26, 1998 as S.1868 by Senator Don Nickles (R-OK), who was Majority Whip at the time. It was quickly cosponsored by other senators, including Senate Foreign Relations Committee Chair Jesse Helms. IRFA provided a far-reaching policy alternative to a previous bill, the Freedom from Religious Persecution Act, which Frank Wolf and Senator Arlen Specter (R-PA) introduced on May 27, 1997 as H.R. 1685/S.772. Frank Wolf re-introduced FRPA as H.R. 2431 on September 9, 1997. H.R.2431 passed the House on May 14, 1998 after multiple revisions, but was never taken up in the Senate. IRFA, however, passed the Senate on October 08, 1998 by a voice vote of 98-0. As there was no time for a conference before the end of the 105th Congress, the Senate renumbered and voted on IRFA as S.Amdt.3789 in the nature of a substitute, so that the House could vote directly on the Senate bill. On October 10, 1998, the House then passed IRFA in its entirety as a substitute amendment to H.R.2431, including the title of "International Religious Freedom Act."

== New legislation ==
The amended Act requires the Ambassador at Large for International Religious Freedom to report directly to the Secretary of State. This reporting structure was implicit in IRFA (1998) but clarified by the 2016 Amendment as not every Secretary of State had respected this arrangement. It establishes an "entities of particular concern" which is a companion to the "countries of particular concern" classification for non-government actors, such as the Islamic State (IS), the Nigerian terrorist organization Boko Haram, and Houthis. The amended act institutes a "designated persons list" for individuals who violate religious freedom and authorizes the president to issue sanctions against those who participate in persecution. Both of these provisions were already contained in the IRFA legislation (Section 402(2)) but are further detailed in the Wolf Amendment.
