= International Religious Freedom Act of 1998 =

United States government agency for religious freedom

- Long title: An Act to express United States foreign policy with respect to, and to strengthen United States advocacy on behalf of, individuals persecuted in foreign countries on account of religion; to authorize United States actions in response to violations of religious freedom in foreign countries; to establish an Ambassador at Large for International Religious Freedom with the Department of State, a Commission on International Religious Freedom, and a Special Adviser on International Religious Freedom with the National Security Council; and for other purposes.
- Enacted by: the 105th United States Congress

Citations
- Public law: Pub. L. 105–292 (text) (PDF)

Legislative history
- Introduced in the Senate as S.1868 - International Religious Freedom Act of 1998 by Don Nickles (R–OK) on March 26, 1998; Passed the Senate on October 8, 1998 (S.Amdt.3789 — 105th Congress (1997–1998) Purpose: In the nature of a substitute. Sponsor: Sen. Nickles, Don [R-OK]); Passed the House on October 10, 1998 (Resolving differences -- House actions: On motion that the House suspend the rules and agree to the Senate amendments Agreed to by voice vote.(consideration: CR H10434-10447)); Signed into law by President Bill Clinton on October 27, 1998

The International Religious Freedom Act of 1998 (Public Law 105–292, as amended by Public Law 106–55, Public Law 106–113, Public Law 107–228, Public Law 108–332, and Public Law 108–458) was passed to promote religious freedom as a foreign policy of the United States, to promote greater religious freedom in countries which engage in or tolerate violations of religious freedom, and to advocate on the behalf of individuals persecuted for their religious beliefs and activities in foreign countries. The Act was signed into law by President Bill Clinton on October 27, 1998. Three cooperative entities have been maintained by this act to monitor religious persecution.

1. An Ambassador-at-Large for International Religious Freedom within the Department of State, who is the highest-ranking US diplomat on international religious freedom, and who is tasked with carrying out the provisions of IRFA: the Annual Report, negotiations with foreign governments to bring about greater religious freedom, and the determination of Countries of Particular Concern (CPC's) under IRFA, which entails further actions.
2. A bipartisan United States Commission on International Religious Freedom, designed to provide independent policy recommendations and fact-finding, and
3. A Special Adviser on International Religious Freedom within the National Security Council.

IRFA was introduced on March 26, 1998, by Senator Don Nickles (R-OK), Senator Joseph Lieberman (D-CT) and others, as a far-reaching policy response to the Freedom from Religious Persecution Act of 1997, introduced by Congressman Frank Wolf (R-VA) and Senator Arlen Specter on May 27, 1997, as H.R.1685/S.772, and subsequently reintroduced on September 8, 1997, as H.R. 2431, the Freedom from Religious Persecution Act. H.R. 2431 affected only a handful of countries, with a narrow range of measures; IRFA based its measures on international human rights law and created a structure to address religious freedom issues in depth all over the world. On October 8, 1998, the Senate passed IRFA by a vote of 98–0. IRFA was renumbered as Amendment S. 3789 to H.R.2431, so that the Senate version could be adopted in its entirety as an amendment in the nature of a substitute to H.R.2431, including its title, the "International Religious Freedom Act." IRFA was passed in full by the House on the consent calendar on October 10, 1998.

== History ==
In the mid-1990s, a United States political coalition developed between Reagan conservatives and evangelical Christians. This coalition emphasizes promotes its view of religious freedom as an important objective of United States foreign policy. Among its efforts was the passage of the International Religious Freedom Act of 1998.

The former Assistant Secretary of State for Democracy, Human Rights, and Labor, John Shattuck, cited specific countries that fail to recognize the fundamental right of religious freedom. The Act tried to recognize forms of religious discrimination and oppression, contending that over one-half of the population of the world lives under regimes that have strict policies against basic religious freedoms. Title VII of the Act has noted that some regimes engage in persecution that includes subjection of those people who engage in practice of religious faiths that are not state sponsored, to detention, torture, beatings, forced marriage, rape, imprisonment, enslavement, mass resettlement and death. IRFA Sponsor Senator Don Nickles (R-OK), in his speech to the Congress on October 2, 1998, stated:

...this is an important aspect of the bill. If the definition of religious persecution were limited to only torture, imprisonment, or death, ... the Act would only cover about a few countries, and would not include about 80 to 85% of the religious persecution that takes place in the world ...

This Act was first introduced as S.1868 by Senator Don Nickles on March 26, 1998. It provided an alternative to H.R. 2431, "the Freedom from Religious Persecution Act of 1997", originally H.R.1685/S.772 introduced by Representative Frank Wolf and Senator Arlen Specter (R-PA) on May 27, 1997 and then reintroduced as H.R. 2431 on September 9, 1997. During consideration of H.R. 2431 in the House International Relations Committee (HIRC) on April 1, 1998, Rep. Kevin Brady (R-TX) proposed the text of S.1868, just introduced in the Senate, as an Amendment in the Nature of a Substitute. This forced several important changes to H.R. 2431, including moving the persecution "tzar" contained in H.R.2431 from the White House to the State Department, and an agreement to allow Rep. Brady to offer a floor amendment to H.R.2431 if he would withdraw his amendment in committee. Rep. Brady withdrew his amendment in committee, and added several provisions from S.1868 to H.R.2431 during the general vote on H.R. 2431, which passed the House on May 14, 1998, by a vote of 375–41, and was subsequently sent to the Senate. However, H.R. 2431 was never considered by the Senate. S.1868 was sponsored by many senators in addition to Majority Whip Don Nickles, including powerful Foreign Relations chairman Senator Jesse Helms (R-NC). Despite initial opposition from the State Department, the White House and advocates of H.R. 2431, S.1868 eventually passed the Senate 98–0. Because this vote was one of the last substantive votes of the 105th Congress, the House agreed to take the Senate version in its entirety, as there was no time for a conference. Accordingly, the International Religious Freedom Act of 1998 was renumbered in the Senate as S. 3789, an Amendment in the Nature of a Substitute to H.R. 2431, and then passed on to the House, where it was voted in on the consent calendar on October 10, 1998.

The differences between H.R. 2431, the "Freedom from Religious Persecution Act" and S. 1868, the "International Religious Freedom Act", were comprehensive, but can be summarized as a narrow focus in FRPA on punishing worst violators, compared with IRFA's worldwide focus on promoting religious freedom, using both positive and negative incentives. H.R.2431 affected a handful of countries and religious groups, with mandatory sanctions if a persecution monitoring "tzar" in the White House found that persecution was "widespread and ongoing" "when such persecution includes abduction, enslavement, killing, imprisonment, forced mass resettlement, rape, or crucifixion, or other forms of torture". This definition was so extreme as to exclude most countries in which gross violations of international religious freedom take place. IRFA, in contrast, used the internationally recognized definitions of "gross violations of human rights" in the requirement to take action in persecuting countries, on behalf of any religious believers. Further, IRFA put in place a comprehensive structure headed by a high-ranking diplomat who could negotiate with other governments on behalf of the President, rather than a mid-level White House official tasked with making findings, under FRPA. IRFA also established the Annual Report on International Religious Freedom, which requires US embassies all over the world to interact with their counterparts and NGO's in the process of reporting, as well as requiring the US to state what efforts it has undertaken to promote religious freedom. In addition to the Ambassador at Large for International Religious Freedom, and the Annual Report, the cornerstone of IRFA is the requirement that each year the President review and determine whether any country has met the threshold, based on international human rights law, of "Country of Particular Concern" or CPC, engaging in or tolerating "particularly severe violations of religious freedom." The CPC determinations lead to a consultation and negotiations process resulting in a range of actions and sanctions if the offenses are not addressed. Based on similar successful provisions in trade law, IRFA included a ground-breaking provision that the goal of these negotiations was to secure a "Binding Agreement" to cease the violations. In such a case, sanctions would be withheld. In a landmark first for human rights, after designating Vietnam a CPC, Ambassador John Hanford (appointed by George W. Bush as IRF Ambassador from 2002 to 2009) secured a Binding Agreement under IRFA with Vietnam. Reversing the violations that had led to CPC designation, Vietnam issued a decree ordering the cessation of its practice of forced renunciations of faith, released all known religious prisoners, and allowed hundreds of churches it had shut down to re-open. To date this is the only Binding Agreement secured under IRFA, but it demonstrates the IRFA policy goal of securing systemic change rather than mere punishment.

== Organization ==
The Act has seven titles, each containing numerous sections. These are:

- Title I—Department of State Activity
- Title II—Commission on International Religious Freedom
- Title III—National Security Council
- Title IV—Presidential Actions
- Title V—Promotion of Religious Freedom
- Title VI—Refugee, Asylum, and Consular Matters
- Title VII—Miscellaneous Provisions

== Scope and substance of the Act ==
As per the Act, the Congress and the President are obligated to take into account the various issues of religious freedom while developing the country's foreign policy. Under Title I of the Act, a permanent infrastructure within the State Department is created for dealing with religious issues. This is known as the Office of International Religious Freedom, headed by the Ambassador at Large for International Religious Freedom, who wields the authority to negotiate on behalf of the President with other governments, and oversees the Annual Report and the designation of Countries of Particular Concern (CPC). Title I also details the composition of the Annual Report on International Religious Freedom. The Act directs the state Department to monitor religious freedom worldwide and issue the annual report. Title II creates the Commission on International Religious Freedom and Title III a special advisor to the president on international religious freedom within the National Security Council. The crux of the Act lies in Title IV. Title IV details the requirement that the President annually review and determine whether any country has met the CPC threshold, based in international human rights law, of "engaging in or tolerating particularly severe violations of religious freedom". Any designation then leads to a series of negotiations and consultations resulting in a number of possible actions available to the president, in consultation of the secretary of state, the ambassador at large, the National Security Council special advisor, and the commission, design a response to those countries. In practice this authority of the President is delegated to the Secretary of State and the Ambassador.

Countries that are severe violators of religious freedom are categorized as CPC's under Sec 402 of the Act and this subjects them to punitive sanctions which are listed in Sec. 405. Under this section, the president must either enter into a binding agreement with the concerned country to end the religious persecution, or to choose from remedies outlined in Sec. 405 of the Act. This section offers the president fifteen options to exercise against countries engaging in religious persecution, ranging from private negotiations to sanctions, or a "commensurate action" not listed in IRFA but which would serve the purpose of advancing religious freedom. These include

- a private or a public demarche;
- a private or public condemnation;
- the delay or cancellation of scientific or cultural exchanges;
- the denial, delay, or cancellation of working, official or state visits;
- the withdrawing, limitation, or suspension of some forms of U.S. aid;
- direction to public and private international institutions to deny assistance;
- and sanctions prohibiting the US government from entering into import or export agreements with the designated governments.

Under Title IV, the president may waive punitive measures against the concerned country if he or she determines that national security is at risk or if the proposed action would harm rather than benefit the individuals and communities the Act is designed to help. Title V of the act seeks to promote religious freedom abroad through the way of international media, exchanges and foreign service awards for working to promote human rights. Title VI requires appropriate training for asylum officers (domestic), refugee officers (abroad) and judges. The final provision of the Act, Title VII contains miscellaneous provisions, including 701, which urges transnational corporations to adopt codes of conduct sensitive to the right to freedom of religion.

== Ambassador at Large for International Religious Freedom and Office of International Religious Freedom ==
Office of International Religious Freedom
- Seal of the United States Department of State

Agency overview
- Formed: 1998; 28 years ago
- Jurisdiction: Executive branch of the United States
- Agency executives: Rashad Hussain, Ambassador at Large for International Religious Freedom; Daniel Nadel, Director of the Office of International Religious Freedom
- Parent department: U.S. Department of State
- Website: Official website

The establishment of a high-ranking Ambassador at Large for International Religious Freedom is a foundational provision of IRFA, investing all the authority of the United States government in the Ambassador's negotiations with governments around the world, in the promotion of religious freedom. The Office of International Religious Freedom, supporting the Ambassador, was formed under Title I of the International Religious Freedom Act, until June 2019 the office was housed in but not under the authority of the U.S. Department of State's Bureau of Democracy, Human Rights, and Labor. On June 21, 2019, along with the release of the 2018 International Religious Freedom Report, Secretary of State Mike Pompeo announced that the Office of International Religious Freedom, along with the Office of the Special Envoy to Monitor and Combat Anti-Semitism, were elevated to report directly to the under secretary for civilian security, democracy, and human rights and the Ambassador at Large would report directly to the Secretary of State. The IRF office has the mission of promoting religious freedom as a core objective of US foreign policy. The Office Director and the staff monitor religious persecution and discrimination worldwide, and assist in recommending and implementing policies in respective regions or countries. The Ambassador oversees the IRF office and is the highest-ranking US advocate for international religious freedom, serving as primary adviser advisor on this issue to the President and the Secretary of State. In negotiations abroad dealing with religious freedom, the Ambassador outranks the country ambassador.

The United States seeks to conform with international covenants that guarantee the inalienable right of religious freedom to every human being. The Act is committed to the promotion of freedom of religion and conscience throughout the world as a fundamental human right and a source of stability for all countries. It further seeks to assist newly formed democracies in implementing freedom of religion and conscience. Religious and human rights non-governmental organizations are sought to promote religious freedom. Furthermore, the U.S. seeks to identify and denounce regimes that are severe persecutors of their citizens or others on the basis of religious beliefs.

The Office is responsible for the monitoring of religious persecution and discrimination worldwide, and for advocating for greater religious freedom. Its specific activities include:

1. It makes the Annual Report on International Religious Freedom, which is submitted to the Congress annually by the Department of State in compliance with Section 102(b) of the Act. This report supplements the most recent Human Rights Reports. It includes individual country chapters on the status of religious freedom.
2. On the basis of these annual reports, the Secretary of State will designate any country that commits "systematic, ongoing and egregious violations of religious freedom" as a Country of Particular Concern or CPC. States so designated are subject to further actions, including economic sanctions by the United States.
3. Meetings are organized with foreign government officials at all levels, as well as religious and human rights groups in the United States and abroad, to address the problem of religious freedom.
4. Providing testimony to the United States Congress, on issues of international religious freedom.
5. Maintaining a close cooperation with the independent United States Commission on International Religious Freedom.
6. Sponsorship of reconciliation programs in disputes that divide groups along lines of religious beliefs. The office seeks to support NGOs that are promoting reconciliation in such disputes.
7. Outreach programs to American religious communities.

== Commission on International Religious Freedom ==
This commission is an independent nine-member, bipartisan U.S. government agency that was created to provide independent recommendations to the State Department and the President, and to monitor the status of freedom of thought, conscience, and religion or belief abroad, as defined in the Universal Declaration of Human Rights and related international instruments and to give independent policy recommendations to the President, the Secretary of State and the United States Congress. This commission is funded entirely by the federal government on an annual basis and staffed by government employees.

The Commission monitors the effect of other countries' policies on religious groups, and may hold hearings to educate Congress and the public about religious persecution around the world. The Commission may not implement sanctions on countries that violate religious freedom as it only has advisory and monitoring authority, including the authority to hold hearings. While the Department of State report contains a detailed country-by-country analysis of religious freedom, the commission's report covers few countries, but makes policy recommendations to the executive and legislative branches of the government. The Commission report also reviews and analyzes the work of Department of State.

== Special Advisor on International Religious Freedom ==
The President is assigned a special advisor on international religious freedom within the National Security Council by Title III of the Act. Under the Act, the special advisor is designated to serve as a resource for executive branch officials, compiling and analyzing information on the facts and circumstances of violations of religious freedom and formulating possible US reactions to religious persecution in the light of US national security interests. The position of the director shall be comparable to that of director within the executive office of the President.

== Justification and legal basis ==
IRFA was enacted by the US Congress on the basis of constitutional and international law principles. Several of the sponsors of the bill spoke of the United States as being born out of the need for religious freedom, and that this principle was codified in the First Amendment to the United States Constitution. The First Amendment explicitly guarantees the fundamental right of religious freedom and liberty to practice any faith as according to one's choice. Their contention made, to this is that the United States has the duty to uphold this fundamental right. During a speech about the Act, on October 9, 1998, IRFA co-sponsor Senator Joseph Lieberman (D-CT), gave the reason as to why the founding fathers were drawn to America,

... because of a belief that no government has the right to tell the people how to worship and certainly not the right to discriminate against them or persecute them for the way they chose to express their faith in God.

The principles of international law were made inherent in the act so as to clarify its commitment to promote international religious freedom. As per the Universal Declaration of Human Rights (UDHR) and the International Covenant on Civil and Political Rights (ICCPR), religious freedom is one of the most fundamental human rights outlined. This right explicitly includes the freedom to change religious faith or belief, and freedom, either alone or in community with others and in public or private, to manifest his religion or belief in teaching, practice, worship, and observance. All the members of the United Nations have adopted the Universal Declaration of Human Rights by the virtue of their UN membership and are pledged to uphold its provisions. The Article 18(1) of the International Covenant on Civil and Political Rights was ratified with reservations in April 1992, also includes a freedom of religion clause similar to that of the UDHR's. The principles in the above-mentioned international law documents, according to the Act, create a sense of responsibility in its governments to protect the freedom of religion, which the Act does by exercising the United States' ability to choose its limit in dealing with countries that violate religious freedom.

The justification for this Act lies on the guarantee of freedom of religion found in the US Constitution and in principles of international law. Critics of this Act would probably contend that while the US Constitution does prohibit Federal and State governments from infringing on the religious liberties of people living within the US, it does not obligate or permit the US to use embargo or military intervention as means to uphold these rights abroad. The rejoinder would be that the US can prioritize those rights it holds most dear in its interaction with other states, and that IRFA is a means to help other nations secure freedoms to which they have already committed themselves, but may not in fact uphold.

== Related legislation ==
On February 10, 2014, Rep. Grace Meng introduced the bill To amend the International Religious Freedom Act of 1998 to include the desecration of cemeteries among the many forms of violations of the right to religious freedom (H.R. 4028; 113th Congress) in the United States House of Representatives. The bill would amend the findings of the International Religious Freedom Act of 1998 by including the desecration of cemeteries among the various violations of the right to religious freedom. Meng said that "this legislation would be a new and important tool in our fight against the desecration of cemeteries" because it would "combat religiously-motivated vandalism of cemeteries and also prevent developers from building over cemeteries, a new and emerging threat in places where there are no Jewish communities left to protect burial grounds."

On May 9, 2014, Rep. Steve Stockman introduced the European Union Religious Freedom Act in the United States House of Representatives. The bill would amend the findings of the International Religious Freedom Act of 1998 by including prohibitions against homeschooling, religious methods of meat production, circumcision, and wearing religious garb, among the various violations of the right to religious freedom.

On December 16, 2016, Barack Obama signed into law the Frank R. Wolf International Religious Freedom Act which amends the 1998 Act by specifically extending protection to non-theists as well as those who do not claim any particular religion. The Frank Wolf Act does not materially change IRFA, but it does spell out certain authorities and provisions in greater clarity, such as the ability to designate non-state actors under IRFA (this authority exists already in IRFA under Section 404 (2) and others, but is further clarified by the Frank Wolf Act.)

== See also ==
- United States Commission on International Religious Freedom
- Religious intolerance
- Country of Particular Concern
- Eleanor Roosevelt Award for Human Rights
- Religion in the United States
- Narendra Modi is the only person ever banned under this law.
