= Linda Sun =

Chinese-American officeholder (born c. 1983)

- 孙雯

Deputy Chief of Staff to the Governor
- In office 2021–2022
- Governor: Kathy Hochul

Deputy Chief Diversity Officer
- In office 2018–2020
- Governor: Andrew Cuomo

Personal details
- Born: 1983 (age 42–43) Nanjing, Jiangsu, China
- Spouse: Chris Hu
- Education: Barnard College (BS); Columbia University (MEd)

Linda Sun (Chinese: 孙雯; pinyin: Sūn Wén; born 1983) is a Chinese-American former public servant in New York State. She served as the deputy chief diversity officer in the administration of New York state governor Andrew Cuomo (2018–2020), and deputy chief of staff to his successor, governor Kathy Hochul (2021–2022).

In September 2024, Sun was arrested and charged with eight federal crimes related to allegedly acting as an undisclosed foreign agent for the government of the People's Republic of China. Additional charges were filed in the first and second superseding indictments in February and June 2025, respectively. Her case went to trial in late 2025, and ended in a mistrial after the jury deadlocked. Prosecutors are seeking a retrial.

== Early life and education ==
Sun was born in Nanjing. She moved from China to the United States with her parents at the age of five, and later became a naturalized U.S. citizen. She received an undergraduate degree in political science from Barnard College in 2006, and in 2009 earned a master's degree in education from Columbia University.

== Career ==
Prior to her positions with the Cuomo and Hochul administrations, Sun began her career in public service in New York state's legislative branch in 2009, holding a variety of positions, including chief of staff to an assemblywoman, Grace Meng, who is now a U.S. representative. In 2012 the Cuomo administration hired Sun as its director of Asian American affairs and Queens regional representative. She was then appointed director of external affairs for Empire State Development, which handles economic development across the state. Prior to becoming deputy chief of staff for the Hochul administration, she also worked briefly for the New York State Department of Financial Services. She left Hochul's executive chamber after roughly 15 months, moving on to a position at the New York State Department of Labor in November 2022. Following her dismissal from the Hochul administration, she worked as a campaign manager for Austin Cheng, a Democrat who unsuccessfully ran for Congress in New York's 3rd congressional district.

== Legal proceedings ==
=== Indictments ===
On September 3, 2024, in the federal court in Brooklyn, New York, after being arrested at her Long Island home, Sun was charged by the United States Attorney's office with eight criminal counts—including conspiring to act as an illegal foreign agent, visa fraud, and conspiring to launder money—related to acting as an illegal agent for the Chinese government and Chinese Communist Party (CCP) in exchange for millions of dollars as well as all-expenses-paid travel to China; tickets to top shows, concerts and sporting events (including VIP suite access for at least one such event); employment in China for Sun's cousin; and home deliveries of Nanjing-style salted ducks prepared by a Chinese government official's personal chef. According to the unsealed 65-page indictment, federal prosecutors have alleged that Sun and her husband used this money to buy several luxury cars (including a 2024 Ferrari Roma, 2024 Range Rover/L460, and a 2022 Mercedes GLB250W4) as well as a 5-bedroom home in Manhasset, Long Island worth between US$3.6 million and US$4.1 million and a condominium in Honolulu worth between US$1.9 million and US$2.1 million, but never reported these benefits she received from China as is required of New York state government employees, nor registered as a foreign agent.

The prosecutors also alleged that Sun, at the direction of Chinese consul general Huang Ping, used her position to change both Cuomo's and Hochul's "messaging regarding issues of importance to the PRC and the CCP" and helped minimize interactions between the governor's office and representatives from the Taipei Economic and Cultural Representative Office in the United States, provided unauthorized invitation letters from the governor's office to make it easier for Chinese government officials to travel to the United States and meet with state officials in New York, and sought to arrange a high-level visit to China for a New York state official. Additionally, Sun is alleged to have urged state officials to not publicly address the persecution of China's Uyghur minority. The indictment also alleged that Sun worked with the Henan Association of Eastern America, a Flushing-based Henan hometown association closely affiliated with the united front, to influence Hochul into visiting Henan province.

Sun's husband Chris Hu (Chinese: 胡骁; pinyin: Hú Xiāo; American born 1982), who operated a Queens-based seafood business and wine store, as well as a financial consulting firm, was charged with money laundering conspiracy, as well as conspiracy to commit bank fraud and misuse of means of identification.

FBI acting assistant director Christie Curtis said Hu "facilitated the transfer of millions of dollars in kickbacks for personal gain," while Sun "wielded her position of influence among executives to covertly promote" the agendas of the Chinese government and the Chinese Communist Party, "directly threatening our country's national security." Hu is alleged to have opened a bank account in the name of a relative (illegally using a photo of the relative's driver's license to do so) to illegally launder money, but these accounts were used entirely by Hu. Prosecutors drew on what they described as a complex set of evidence, much of it in Mandarin. Assistant U.S. attorney Alex Solomon stated that the couple "operated a multitude of shell entities," including "more than 80 different accounts." "This is no ordinary financial fraud," Solomon said.

Both Sun and Hu pleaded not guilty to all counts in the indictment, which include violating and conspiring to violate the Foreign Agents Registration Act, visa fraud, alien smuggling, and money laundering conspiracy. Their houses, cars, US$210,000 in cash, and money from various other accounts that Hu allegedly controlled, were seized by prosecutors. Sun was released on a US$1.5 million bond, and Hu was released on a US$500,000 bond. The two were required to surrender their passports, and ordered not to have any contact with the Chinese consulate.

Responding to these charges, Hochul stated that her administration fired Sun in March 2023 "the second we discovered some levels of misconduct" and "alerted the authorities." In February 2025, additional criminal charges were filed against Sun and Hu in the first superseding indictment.

In June 2025, a federal grand jury added new charges in the second superseding indictment for a fraudulent scheme that allegedly helped steer lucrative New York State PPE contracts to Chinese companies at the start of the COVID-19 pandemic.

=== Trial ===
Sun's trial began in November 2025, with Judge Brian Cogan presiding. On December 22, 2025, a mistrial was declared due to a hung jury; a juror who gave a media interview after the ruling said the panel had split 10-2 for conviction on all but one charge and 11-1 for conviction on the remaining charge. Prosecutors intend to re-try the case.

== See also ==
- Chinese espionage in the United States
- List of Chinese spy cases in the United States
