= Ambassador-at-large =

Type of diplomat

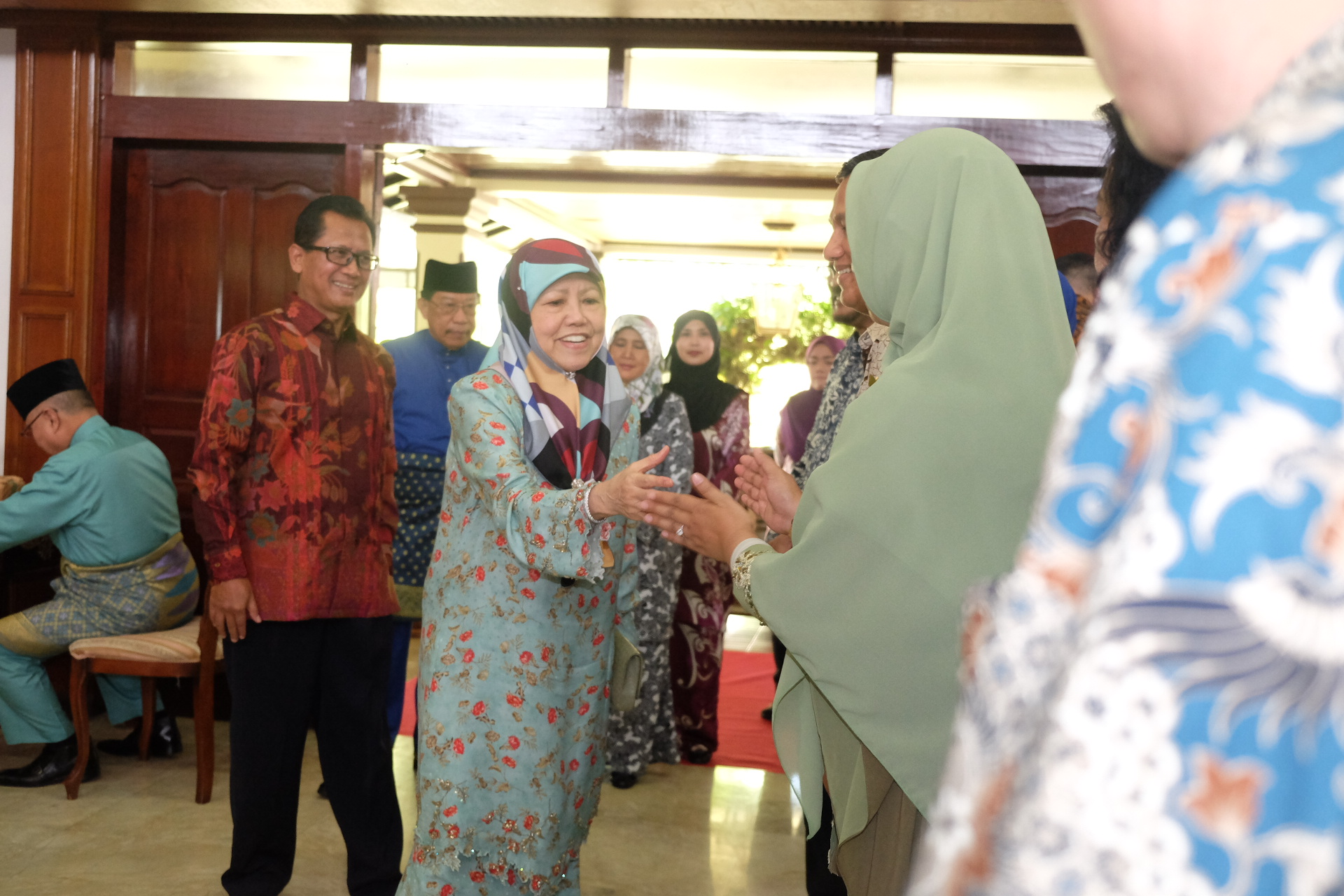
Ambassador-at-large of Brunei Princess Masna greeting Indonesian delegations

An ambassador-at-large is a diplomat, a secretary, or a minister of the highest rank who is accredited to represent a country and its people internationally.

Unlike an ambassador-in-residence, who is usually limited to a country or embassy, the ambassador-at-large is entrusted to operate in several usually neighboring countries, a region or sometimes hold a seat in an international organization like the United Nations and the other international organizations. In some cases, an ambassador-at-large may even be specifically assigned a role to advise and assist the state or a government in particular issues. Historically, presidents or prime ministers have designated special diplomatic envoys for specific assignments, primarily overseas but sometimes also within the country as an ambassador-at-large.

== Honorific title ==
According to international protocol, ambassadors and ambassadors-at-large are officially styled and addressed as His/Her Excellency, or Mister/Madam Ambassador. The title may be abbreviated in official correspondence as H.E.

== United States ambassadors-at-large ==
The US president appointed the first official who specifically bore the title of ambassador-at-large on 12 March 1949 under the authority vested in Article II, Section 2 of the US Constitution to deal with specific foreign policy issues, which have been frequently spelled out in their commissions.

Ambassador-at-large positions in the diplomatic corps of the US State Department include:

- Coordinator for Counterterrorism
- United States Ambassador-at-Large for Arctic Affairs
- United States Ambassador-at-Large for Cyberspace and Digital Policy
- United States Ambassador-at-Large for Global Criminal Justice
- United States Ambassador-at-Large for Global Women's Issues
- United States Ambassador-at-Large for International Religious Freedom
- United States Ambassador-at-Large to Monitor and Combat Trafficking in Persons
- United States Global AIDS Coordinator

== Notable ambassadors-at-large ==
=== Asia ===
- Princess Masna, Brunei's Ambassador-at-Large at the Ministry of Foreign Affairs
- (Iran) Mehdi Samii, Iranian ambassador-at-large for Economic affairs and Advisor to the Prime Minister for International Financing (1971–1973)
- Lon Non, Ambassador-at-Large for the Khmer Republic
- Mohammad Ziauddin, Ambassador-at-large of the Prime Minister of Bangladesh
- Javed Malik, Pakistan's Ambassador-at-Large to the Persian gulf Region
- (Philippines) Carlos P. Romulo, President of the United Nations General Assembly (1949–1950), Secretary/Minister of Foreign Affairs and Ambassador-at-Large under three Philippine Presidents: Elpidio Quirino (1950–1952), Diosdado Macapagal (1963–1964) and Ferdinand Marcos (1968–1984)
- (Philippines) León María Guerrero III, Undersecretary for Foreign Affairs under Ramon Magsaysay (1953–1954) and Ambassador-at-Large under four Philippine Presidents: Ramon Magsaysay (1954–1957), Carlos P. Garcia (1957–1961), Diosdado Macapagal (1961–1965) and Ferdinand E. Marcos (1965–1980)
- Chan Heng Chee, Ambassador-at-Large representing Singapore and former ambassador to the United States from 1996 to 2012
- Tommy Koh, Ambassador-at-Large of Singapore
- Ong Keng Yong, Ambassador-at-Large at the Ministry of Foreign Affairs, Singapore and former Secretary-General of Association of Southeast Asian Nations (ASEAN)
- Gopinath Pillai, former Ambassador-at-Large of Singapore
- Gene Loh, Ambassador-at-Large of the Republic of China (Taiwan) from 1997 to 2001
- Audrey Tang, Cyber Ambassador-at-Large of the Republic of China (Taiwan) and former Minister of Digital Affairs
- Ahmet Davutoğlu, Formerly Ambassador-at-Large of Turkey; he subsequently served as Foreign Minister and Prime Minister

=== Europe ===
- (Armenia) Charles Aznavour, Franco-Armenian singer, Armenian Ambassador-at-Large to Switzerland, then to the United Nations Organization
- Petri Salo, Finland's Roving Ambassador for the South Caucasus (Armenia, Azerbaijan and Georgia)
- Jacques Valade, Ambassador-at-Large of France for decentralized cooperation in Asia, from 2008 to 2015.
- Stavros Lambrinidis, Ambassador-at-Large of Hellenic Republic, Vice President of the European Parliament and Minister for Foreign Affairs of Greece
- Georg von Habsburg, Ambassador-at-Large of Hungary
- (Republic of Ireland) Dame Nuala O'Loan, of Ireland. Roving Ambassador for Conflict Resolution and Special Envoy to Timor-Leste
- Jarosław Pijarowski, Ambassador-at-Large of International Human Rights Organization for Poland
- (Spain) Cristóbal Colón de Carvajal, 18th Duke of Veragua, Ambassador-at-Large for the Commemorative Events of the 500th Anniversary (Quincentennial) of the Fourth Voyage of Columbus (2002–2006).

=== Africa ===
- Nicolas Kazadi, Ambassador-at-Large for the Democratic Republic of the Congo
- Amina Mohammed, Ambassador-at-large representing Kenya
- Lineo Ntoane, Kingdom of Lesotho Ambassador-at-large
- Princess Esther Kamatari, Ambassador-at-large representing Burundi

=== Americas ===
- Chavano "Buddy" Hield, Ambassador-at-Large for The Bahamas
- Robyn Rihanna Fenty, Ambassador-at-Large for Barbados
- Attallah Shabazz, Ambassador-at-Large for Belize
- Oscar de la Renta, Ambassador-at-Large of the Dominican Republic
- Wyclef Jean, Ambassador-at-Large for Haiti
- Barbara Carrera, former Ambassador-at-large for Nicaragua, appointed by then-president Arnoldo Alemán
- Suzan Johnson Cook, former United States Ambassador-at-Large for International Religious Freedom
- (United States) Henry A. Crumpton, Coordinator for Counterterrorism at the Department of State
- Eric Goosby, United States Global AIDS Coordinator (Ambassador-at-Large for HIV and AIDS)
- John Hanford, former United States Ambassador-at-Large for International Religious Freedom
- Philip Jessup, former United States Ambassador-at-large under President Harry S. Truman
- (United States) Strobe Talbott, US Ambassador-at-Large and Special Advisor to the Secretary on the New Independent States

== See also ==
- Dual accreditation
