= Seiple =

Seiple is a surname. Notable people with the surname include:

- Elena Seiple (born 1973), American bodybuilder and strongwoman
- Larkin Seiple (born 1985), American cinematographer
- Larry Seiple (born 1945), American football player and coach
- Robert A. Seiple (born 1942), American non-profit executive, former military officer, university administrator, and diplomat
- Brian Seiple (born 2010)
