= Harmony Township, New Jersey =

Township in Warren County, New Jersey, US

- Township
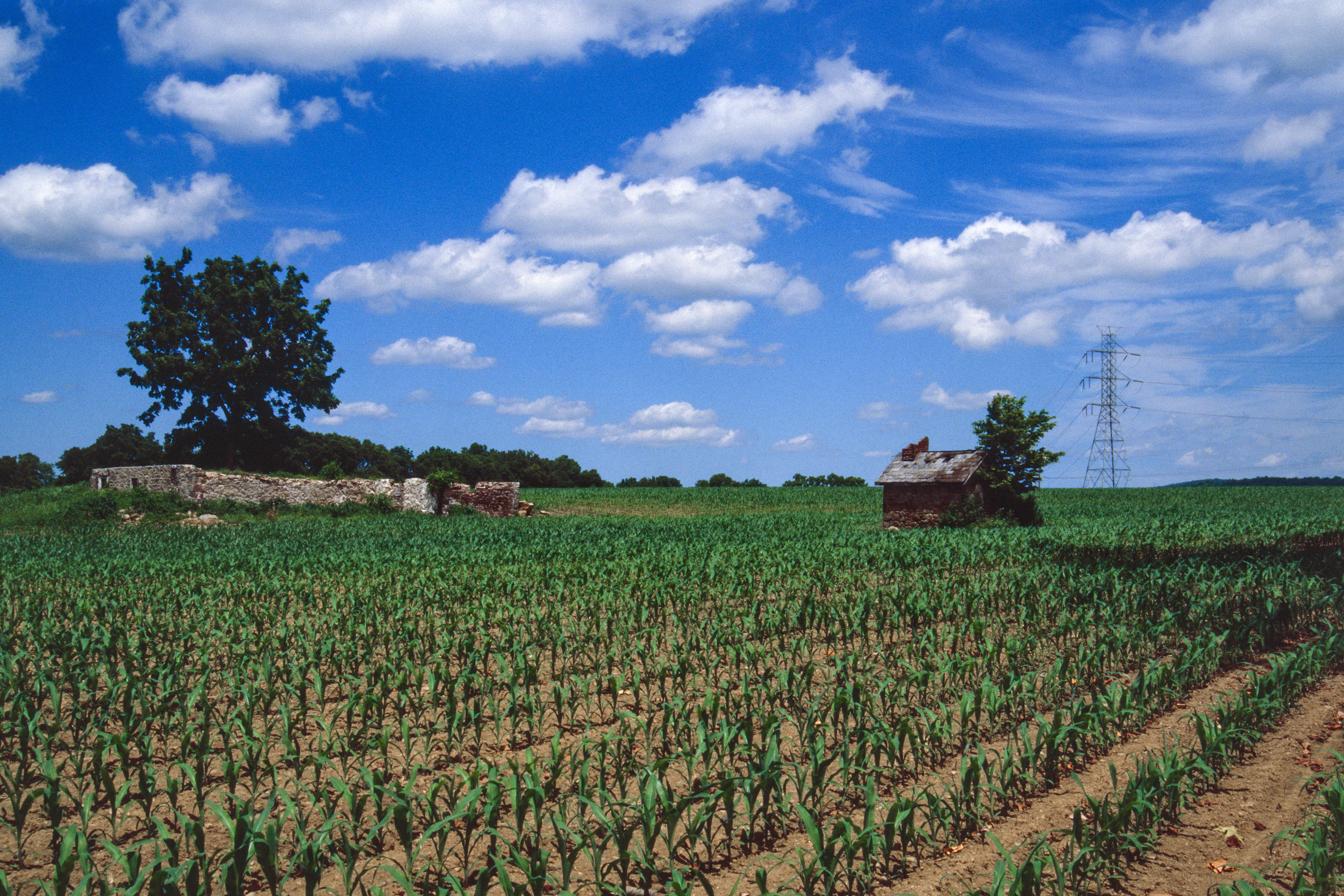
- Barn ruins along Harmony Station Road

- Seal

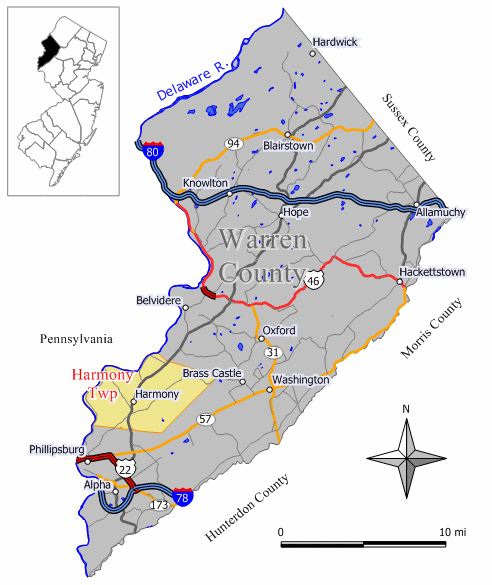
- Location of Harmony Township in Warren County highlighted in yellow (right). Inset map: Location of Warren County in New Jersey highlighted in black (left).

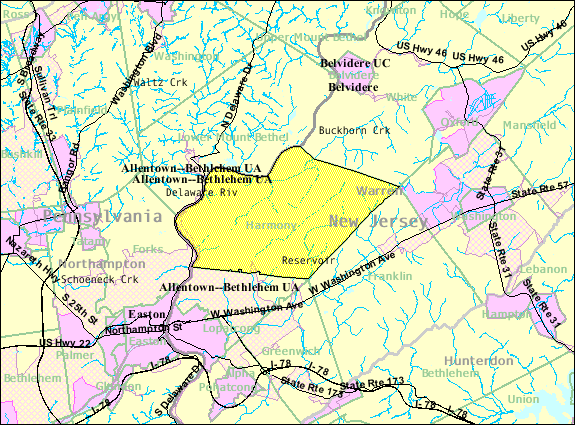
- Census Bureau map of Harmony Township, New Jersey

- Location in Warren County Location in New Jersey Location in the United States
- Coordinates: 40.747701°N 75.122777°W
- Country: United States
- state: New Jersey
- County: Warren
- Incorporated: April 8, 1839
- Named after: Harmon Shipman

Government
  - Type: Township
  - Body: Township Committee
  - Mayor: Brian Tipton (R, term ends December 31, 2023)
  - Administrator / Municipal clerk: Kelley D. Smith

Area
  - Total: 24.13 sq mi (62.49 km^{2})
  - Land: 23.75 sq mi (61.51 km^{2})
  - Water: 0.38 sq mi (0.98 km^{2}) 1.56%
  - Rank: 115th of 565 in state 6th of 22 in county
- Elevation: 686 ft (209 m)

Population (2020)
  - Total: 2,503
  - Estimate (2023): 2,525
  - Rank: 468th of 565 in state 17th of 22 in county
  - Density: 105.4/sq mi (40.7/km^{2})
  - Rank: 538th of 565 in state 19th of 22 in county
- Time zone: UTC−05:00 (Eastern (EST))
  - Summer (DST): UTC−04:00 (Eastern (EDT))
- ZIP Code: 08865 – Phillipsburg
- Area code: 908
- FIPS code: 3404130090
- GNIS feature ID: 0882248
- Website: www.harmonytwp-nj.gov

Harmony Township is a township located in Warren County in the U.S. state of New Jersey. As of the 2020 United States census, the township's population was 2,503, a decrease of 164 (−6.1%) from the 2010 census count of 2,667, which in turn reflected a decline of 62 (−2.3%) from the 2,729 counted in the 2000 census.

Harmony was incorporated as a township by an act of the New Jersey Legislature on April 8, 1839, from portions of Greenwich Township and Oxford Township, based on the results of a referendum held that day. Phillipsburg Township was created March 7, 1851, from portions of the township. The township was named for Harmon Shipman, an early settler.

== Geography ==
According to the U.S. Census Bureau, Harmony township had a total area of 24.13 square miles (62.49 km^{2}), including 23.75 square miles (61.51 km^{2}) of land and 0.38 square miles (0.98 km^{2}) of water (1.56%).

Brainards (with a 2020 population of 194) Harmony CDP (374) and Hutchinson (103) are unincorporated communities and census-designated places (CDPs) located within the township.

Other unincorporated communities, localities and place names located partially or completely within the township include Allens Mills, Harmony Station, Lower Harmony, Martins Creek Station, Montana and Roxburg.

The township borders the Warren County municipalities of Franklin Township, Lopatcong Township and White Township.

== Demographics ==
Historical population
Census	Pop.	Note	%±
1840	1,602		—
1850	1,565	*	−2.3%
1860	1,382		−11.7%
1870	1,405		1.7%
1880	1,350		−3.9%
1890	1,152		−14.7%
1900	1,080		−6.2%
1910	1,490		38.0%
1920	1,444		−3.1%
1930	1,311		−9.2%
1940	1,465		11.7%
1950	1,763		20.3%
1960	2,039		15.7%
1970	2,195		7.7%
1980	2,592		18.1%
1990	2,653		2.4%
2000	2,729		2.9%
2010	2,667		−2.3%
2020	2,503		−6.1%
2023 (est.)	2,525		0.9%
Population sources: 1840–1920 1840 1850–1870; 1850 1870 1880–1890; 1890–1910 1910–1930; 1940–2000 2000; 2010 2020 * = Lost territory in previous decade.

The township's economic data, like all of Warren County, is calculated by the U.S. Census Bureau as part of the Allentown-Bethlehem-Easton, PA-NJ Metropolitan Statistical Area.

=== 2010 census ===
The 2010 United States census counted 2,667 people, 1,017 households, and 760 families in the township. The population density was 112.5 inhabitants per square mile (43.4/km^{2}). There were 1,109 housing units at an average density of 46.8 per square mile (18.1/km^{2}). The racial makeup was 98.28% (2,621) White, 0.67% (18) Black or African American, 0.26% (7) Native American, 0.19% (5) Asian, 0.00% (0) Pacific Islander, 0.07% (2) from other races, and 0.52% (14) from two or more races. Hispanic or Latino of any race were 1.31% (35) of the population.

Of the 1,017 households, 28.0% had children under the age of 18; 63.1% were married couples living together; 8.4% had a female householder with no husband present and 25.3% were non-families. Of all households, 20.6% were made up of individuals and 8.8% had someone living alone who was 65 years of age or older. The average household size was 2.60 and the average family size was 3.02.

21.0% of the population were under the age of 18, 6.9% from 18 to 24, 20.4% from 25 to 44, 35.7% from 45 to 64, and 16.0% who were 65 years of age or older. The median age was 46.1 years. For every 100 females, the population had 97.0 males. For every 100 females ages 18 and older there were 97.4 males. The Census Bureau's 2006–2010 American Community Survey showed that (in 2010 inflation-adjusted dollars) median household income was $82,339 (with a margin of error of +/− $7,992) and the median family income was $86,964 (+/− $11,141). Males had a median income of $60,489 (+/− $4,798) versus $53,100 (+/− $11,618) for females. The per capita income for the borough was $34,985 (+/− $4,062). About 0.7% of families and 1.2% of the population were below the poverty line, including 0.5% of those under age 18 and 1.7% of those age 65 or over.

=== 2000 census ===
As of the 2000 United States census there were 2,729 people, 1,010 households, and 786 families residing in the township. The population density was 114.6 inhabitants per square mile (44.2/km^{2}). There were 1,076 housing units at an average density of 45.2 per square mile (17.5/km^{2}). The racial makeup of the township was 97.91% White, 0.70% African American, 0.07% Native American, 0.40% Asian, 0.18% from other races, and 0.73% from two or more races. Hispanic or Latino of any race were 1.28% of the population.

There were 1,010 households, out of which 34.2% had children under the age of 18 living with them, 66.3% were married couples living together, 7.7% had a female householder with no husband present, and 22.1% were non-families. 17.8% of all households were made up of individuals, and 8.5% had someone living alone who was 65 years of age or older. The average household size was 2.68 and the average family size was 3.05.

In the township, the population was spread out, with 24.1% under the age of 18, 5.2% from 18 to 24, 30.6% from 25 to 44, 26.2% from 45 to 64, and 13.9% who were 65 years of age or older. The median age was 40 years. For every 100 females, there were 97.8 males. For every 100 females age 18 and over, there were 97.2 males.

The median income for a household in the township was $60,977, and the median income for a family was $64,196. Males had a median income of $49,375 versus $28,750 for females. The per capita income for the township was $25,776. About 2.8% of families and 4.5% of the population were below the poverty line, including 3.9% of those under age 18 and 5.3% of those age 65 or over.

== Government ==
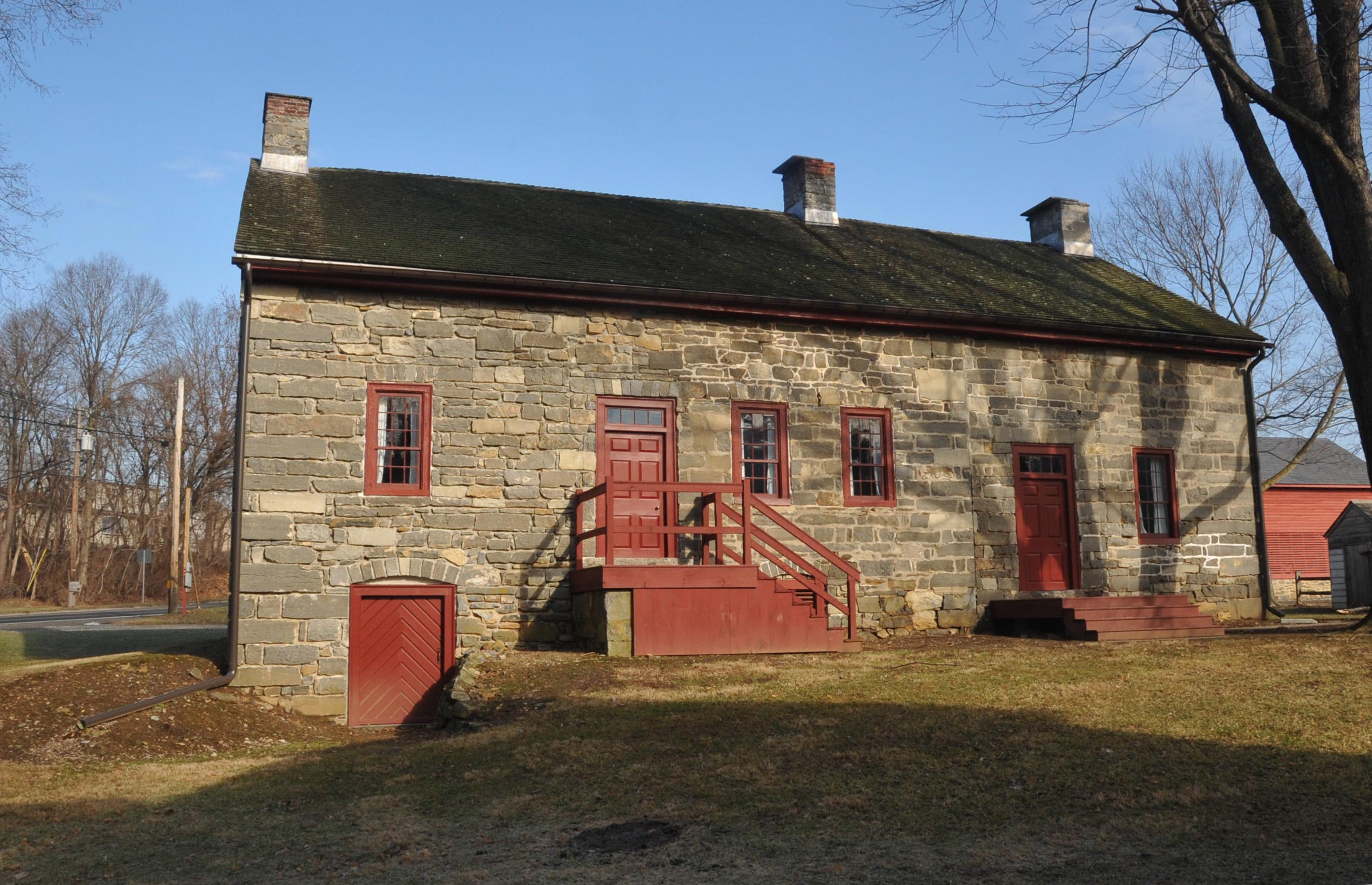
The Van Nest-Hoff-Vannatta Farmstead, listed on the National Register of Historic Places

=== Local government ===
Harmony Township is governed under the Township form of New Jersey municipal government, one of 141 municipalities (of the 564) statewide that use this form, the second-most commonly used form of government in the state. The governing body is comprised of a three-member Township Committee, whose members are elected directly by the voters at-large in partisan elections to serve three-year terms of office on a staggered basis, with one seat coming up for election each year as part of the November general election in a three-year cycle. At an annual reorganization meeting, the Township Committee selects one of its members to serve as Mayor.

As of 2022, members of the Harmony Township Committee are Mayor Brian R. Tipton (R, term on committee ends December 31, 2024; term as mayor ends 2022), Deputy Mayor Diane Yamrock (R, term on committee ends 2023; term as deputy mayor ends 2022) and Richard T. Cornely (R, 2022).

=== Federal, state, and county representation ===
Harmony Township is located in the 7th Congressional District and is part of New Jersey's 23rd state legislative district. Prior to the 2010 Census, Harmony Township had been part of the 5th Congressional District, a change made by the New Jersey Redistricting Commission that took effect in January 2013, based on the results of the November 2012 general elections.

For the 119th United States Congress, New Jersey's 7th congressional district is represented by Thomas Kean Jr. (R, Westfield). New Jersey is represented in the United States Senate by Democrats Cory Booker (Newark, term ends 2027) and Andy Kim (Moorestown, term ends 2031).

For the 2026–2027 session, the 23rd legislative district of the New Jersey Legislature is represented in the State Senate by Doug Steinhardt (R, Lopatcong Township) and in the General Assembly by John DiMaio (R, Hackettstown) and Erik Peterson (R, Franklin Township).

Warren County is governed by a three-member Board of County Commissioners, who are chosen at-large on a staggered basis in partisan elections with one seat coming up for election each year as part of the November general election. At an annual reorganization meeting held in the beginning of January, the board selects one of its members to serve as Commissioner Director and other as Deputy Director. As of 2025, Warren County's Commissioners are:

Deputy Director Jason J. Sarnoski (R, Lopatcong Township; 2025), Lori Ciesla (R, Lopatcong Township; 2026), and Director James R. Kern III (R, Pohatcong Township; 2027).

Constitutional officers of Warren County are: Clerk Holly Mackey (R, Alpha; 2027), Sheriff James McDonald Sr. (R, Phillipsburg; 2025) and Surrogate Michael J. Doherty (R, Washington; 2025).

=== Politics ===
As of March 2011, there were a total of 1,802 registered voters in Harmony Township, of which 333 (18.5% vs. 21.5% countywide) were registered as Democrats, 786 (43.6% vs. 35.3%) were registered as Republicans and 683 (37.9% vs. 43.1%) were registered as Unaffiliated. There were no voters registered to other parties. Among the township's 2010 Census population, 67.6% (vs. 62.3% in Warren County) were registered to vote, including 85.5% of those ages 18 and over (vs. 81.5% countywide).

Gubernatorial election results for Harmony Township
Year	Republican		Democratic		Third party(ies)	
Year	No.	%	No.	%	No.	%
2025	881	69.21%	383	30.09%	9	0.71%
2021	859	74.05%	280	24.14%	21	1.81%
2017	495	68.85%	199	27.68%	25	3.48%
2013	536	75.92%	151	21.39%	19	2.69%
2009	543	65.03%	197	23.59%	95	11.38%
2005	462	55.60%	323	38.87%	46	5.54%

In the 2012 presidential election, Republican Mitt Romney received 702 votes (58.9% vs. 56.0% countywide), ahead of Democrat Barack Obama with 442 votes (37.1% vs. 40.8%) and other candidates with 24 votes (2.0% vs. 1.7%), among the 1,192 ballots cast by the township's 1,826 registered voters, for a turnout of 65.3% (vs. 66.7% in Warren County). In the 2008 presidential election, Republican John McCain received 805 votes (59.9% vs. 55.2% countywide), ahead of Democrat Barack Obama with 486 votes (36.1% vs. 41.4%) and other candidates with 33 votes (2.5% vs. 1.6%), among the 1,345 ballots cast by the township's 1,824 registered voters, for a turnout of 73.7% (vs. 73.4% in Warren County). In the 2004 presidential election, Republican George W. Bush received 798 votes (61.6% vs. 61.0% countywide), ahead of Democrat John Kerry with 479 votes (37.0% vs. 37.2%) and other candidates with 14 votes (1.1% vs. 1.3%), among the 1,296 ballots cast by the township's 1,713 registered voters, for a turnout of 75.7% (vs. 76.3% in the whole county).

United States presidential election results for Harmony Township
Year	Republican		Democratic		Third party(ies)	
Year	No.	%	No.	%	No.	%
2024	1,132	70.57%	447	27.87%	25	1.56%
2020	1,103	67.34%	502	30.65%	33	2.01%
2016	877	67.51%	354	27.25%	68	5.23%
2012	702	60.10%	442	37.84%	24	2.05%
2008	805	61.26%	476	36.23%	33	2.51%
2004	798	61.81%	479	37.10%	14	1.08%

In the 2013 gubernatorial election, Republican Chris Christie received 75.9% of the vote (536 cast), ahead of Democrat Barbara Buono with 21.4% (151 votes), and other candidates with 2.7% (19 votes), among the 717 ballots cast by the township's 1,844 registered voters (11 ballots were spoiled), for a turnout of 38.9%. In the 2009 gubernatorial election, Republican Chris Christie received 543 votes (63.7% vs. 61.3% countywide), ahead of Democrat Jon Corzine with 197 votes (23.1% vs. 25.7%), Independent Chris Daggett with 84 votes (9.9% vs. 9.8%) and other candidates with 11 votes (1.3% vs. 1.5%), among the 852 ballots cast by the township's 1,800 registered voters, yielding a 47.3% turnout (vs. 49.6% in the county).

United States Senate election results for Harmony Township1
Year	Republican		Democratic		Third party(ies)	
Year	No.	%	No.	%	No.	%
2024	1,087	69.15%	447	28.44%	38	2.42%
2018	709	66.64%	290	27.26%	65	6.11%
2012	635	57.94%	424	38.69%	37	3.38%
2006	479	59.14%	291	35.93%	40	4.94%

United States Senate election results for Harmony Township2
Year	Republican		Democratic		Third party(ies)	
Year	No.	%	No.	%	No.	%
2020	1,059	66.10%	504	31.46%	39	2.43%
2014	390	64.25%	185	30.48%	32	5.27%
2013	268	68.72%	119	30.51%	3	0.77%
2008	789	63.53%	418	33.66%	35	2.82%

== Education ==
The Harmony Township School District serves students in public school for pre-kindergarten through eighth grade at Harmony Township School.

As of the 2021–22 school year, the district, comprised of one school, had an enrollment of 200 students and 30.0 classroom teachers (on an FTE basis), for a student–teacher ratio of 6.7:1.

Public school students in ninth through twelfth grades attend Belvidere High School, together with students from Hope Township and White Township, as part of sending/receiving relationships with the Belvidere School District.

As of the 2021–22 school year, the high school had an enrollment of 357 students and 32.3 classroom teachers (on an FTE basis), for a student–teacher ratio of 11.1:1.

Students from the township and from all of Warren County are eligible to attend Ridge and Valley Charter School in Frelinghuysen Township (for grades K–8) or Warren County Technical School in Washington borough (for 9–12), with special education services provided by local districts supplemented throughout the county by the Warren County Special Services School District in Oxford Township (for PreK–12).

== Transportation ==
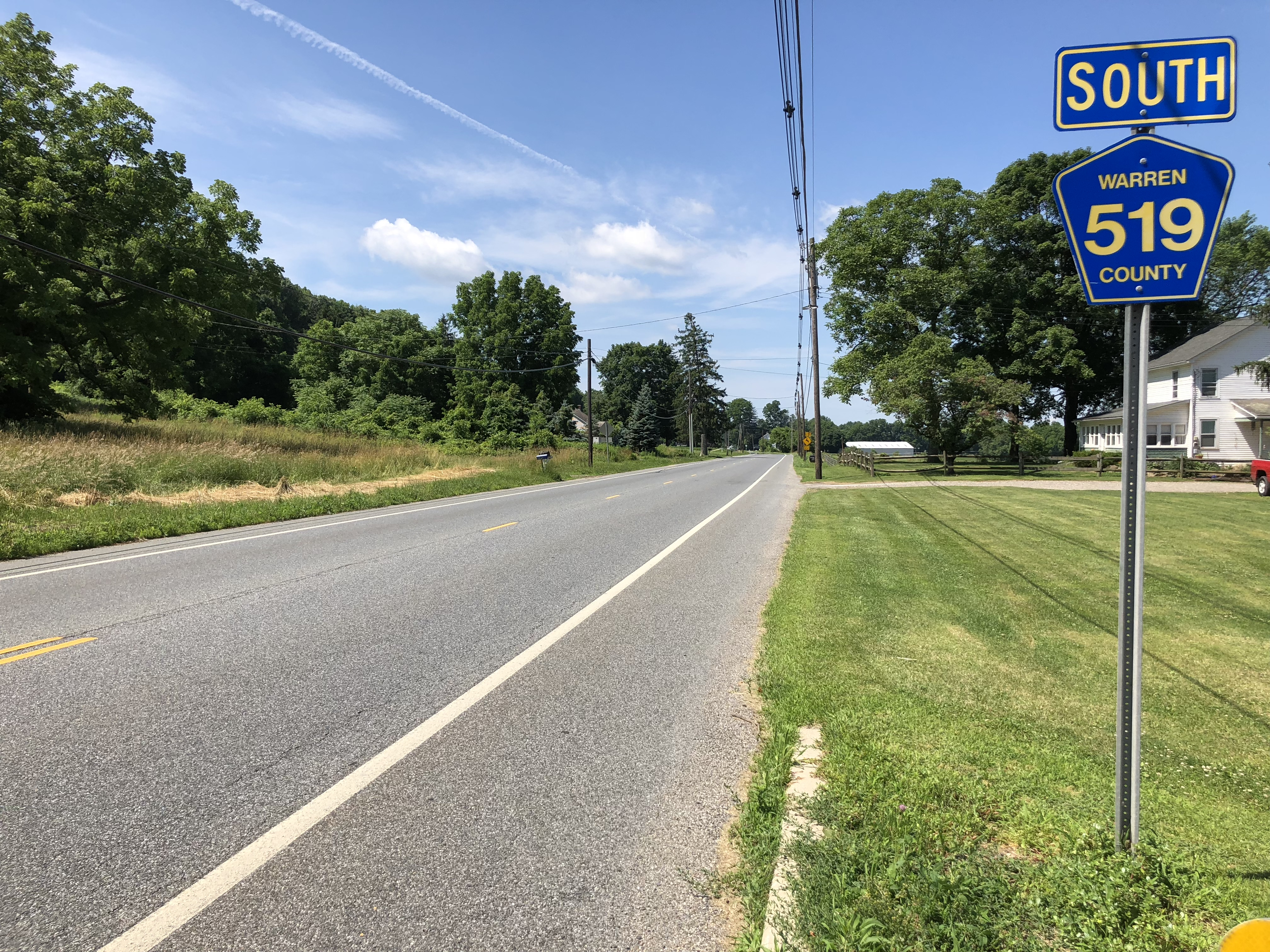
County Road 519 southbound in Harmony Township

As of May 2010, the township had a total of 59.27 miles (95.39 km) of roadways, of which 36.13 miles (58.15 km) were maintained by the municipality and 23.14 miles (37.24 km) by Warren County.

The only major road that traverses Harmony is CR 519, which leads to U.S. Route 22 to the south and U.S. Route 46 to the north.

The closest limited access road is Interstate 78 which is in neighboring Greenwich and Franklin.

== Notable people ==
People who were born in, residents of, or otherwise closely associated with Harmony Township include:

- Jason M. Blazakis, former US government official responsible for deciding if any foreign individual or group was qualified to be officially designated as a "terrorist" or "terrorist group"
- Jim Ringo (1931–2007), professional football player and coach in the National Football League
- Elena Seiple (born 1973), bodybuilder and strongwoman
- Robert A. Seiple (born 1942), non-profit executive, former military officer, university administrator, and diplomat, who served as the first United States Ambassador-at-Large for International Religious Freedom
