= David Saperstein (rabbi) =

American rabbi, lawyer, and former ambassador-at-large

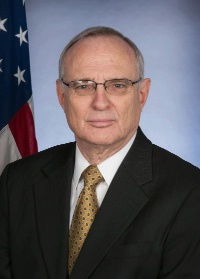
- Saperstein in January 2015

4th United States Ambassador-at-Large for International Religious Freedom
- In office January 6, 2015 – January 20, 2017
- President: Barack Obama
- Preceded by: Suzan Johnson Cook
- Succeeded by: Sam Brownback

Personal details
- Born: August 5, 1947 (age 79) New York City, U.S.
- Spouse: Ellen Weiss
- Education: Cornell University (BA); Hebrew Union College (MHL); American University (JD)

David Nathan Saperstein is an American rabbi, lawyer, and Jewish community leader who served as United States Ambassador-at-Large for International Religious Freedom. For over 40 years, he served as the director and chief legal counsel at the Union for Reform Judaism's Religious Action Center and is the center's director emeritus.

== Early life and education ==
Saperstein was born in New York City to Rabbi Harold Saperstein and Marcia Saperstein. He earned a Bachelor of Arts degree from Cornell University, Master of Hebrew Letters from Hebrew Union College-Jewish Institute of Religion, and Juris Doctor from the Washington College of Law at American University, graduating summa cum laude.

== Career ==
Saperstein succeeded Rabbi Richard G. Hirsch as leader of the Washington D.C.–based social justice and lobbying arm of the North American Reform movement. There, he advocated on a broad range of social justice issues. He directed a staff who provided extensive legislative and programmatic materials to synagogues, federations and Jewish Community Relations Councils nationwide, coordinating social action education programs that train nearly 3,000 Jewish adults, youth, rabbinic and lay leaders each year. He has been described as America's most influential rabbi and as the quintessential religious lobbyist on Capitol Hill.

On August 28, 2008, Saperstein delivered the invocation at the Democratic National Convention's final session, before Senator Barack Obama accepted the party's nomination for president.

In February 2009, he was named to President Barack Obama's Council for Faith-Based and Neighborhood Partnerships. In 2009, Newsweek named him No. 1 on its list of "50 Influential Rabbis."

In 2009, he received the IRLA/NARLA/Liberty Award from the International Religious Liberty Association.

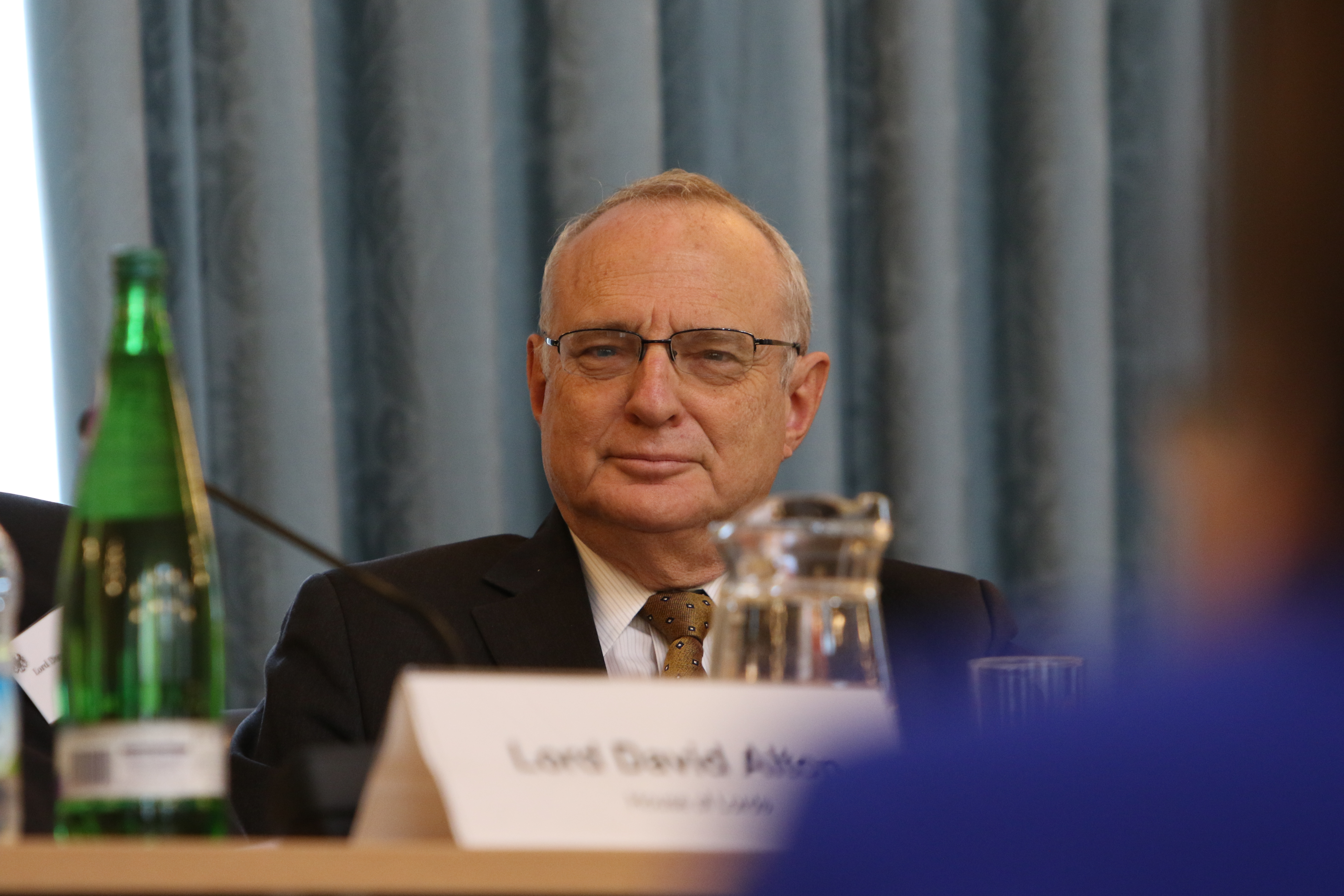
Saperstein speaks at a summit on freedom of religion held at the Foreign & Commonwealth Office in London on October 19, 2016.

On July 28, 2014, President Obama nominated Saperstein to be the first non-Christian to hold the post of United States Ambassador-at-Large for International Religious Freedom. In December 2014 Saperstein's appointment to the post won U.S. Senate confirmation. He succeeded Suzan Johnson Cook in this position.

He has co-chaired the Coalition to Preserve Religious Liberty, and served on the boards of the NAACP, Common Cause, and People For the American Way. In 1999, Saperstein was elected as the first Chair of the congressionally-created U.S. Commission on International Religious Freedom.

Saperstein is also an adjunct professor at Georgetown University Law Center, where he taught courses on church-state law and on Jewish law for 35 years.

On October 11, 2018, Saperstein received the International Religious Liberty Award "for his many years of work defending and supporting freedom of religion or belief for all". Cole Durham, Director of the International Center for Law and Religion Studies (ICLRS) presented the award.

== Personal ==
Saperstein is married to four-time Peabody Award winning journalist Ellen Weiss. They are the parents of musician Daniel Saperstein and journalist Ari Saperstein, executive director of the Los Angeles Reporting Collective. His brother is Jewish historian and rabbi Marc Saperstein.

== See also ==
- Religious Action Center

Diplomatic posts
Preceded by Suzan Johnson Cook	United States Ambassador-at-Large for International Religious Freedom; 2015–2017	Succeeded by Sam Brownback
