= Harmony (CDP), New Jersey =

Populated place in Warren County, New Jersey, US

Harmony, New Jersey
- Census-designated place
- Location in Warren County Location in New Jersey Location in the United States
- Coordinates: 40.750125°N 75.140036°W
- Country: United States
- State: New Jersey
- County: Warren
- Township: Harmony

Area
  - Total: 1.03 sq mi (2.68 km^{2})
  - Land: 1.03 sq mi (2.68 km^{2})
  - Water: 0 sq mi (0.00 km^{2}) 0.00%
- Elevation: 407 ft (124 m)

Population (2020)
  - Total: 374
  - Density: 360.9/sq mi (139.36/km^{2})
- Time zone: UTC−05:00 (Eastern (EST))
  - Summer (DST): UTC−04:00 (EDT)
- Area code: 908
- FIPS code: 34-30060
- GNIS feature ID: 02584001

Harmony is an unincorporated community and census-designated place (CDP) located within Harmony Township in Warren County, in the U.S. state of New Jersey, that was defined as part of the 2010 United States census. As of the 2010 Census, the CDP's population was 441.

== Geography ==
According to the United States Census Bureau, the CDP had a total area of 1.240 square miles (3.210 km^{2}), all of which was land.

== Demographics ==
Historical population
Census	Pop.	Note	%±
2010	441		—
2020	374		−15.2%
U.S. Decennial Census; 2010 2020

Harmony first appeared as a census designated place in the 2010 U.S. census.

=== 2020 census ===
Harmony CDP, New Jersey – Racial and ethnic composition Note: the US Census treats Hispanic/Latino as an ethnic category. This table excludes Latinos from the racial categories and assigns them to a separate category. Hispanics/Latinos may be of any race.
Race / Ethnicity (NH = Non-Hispanic)	Pop 2010	Pop 2020	% 2010	% 2020
White alone (NH)	431	356	97.73%	95.19%
Black or African American alone (NH)	3	2	0.68%	0.53%
Native American or Alaska Native alone (NH)	0	0	0.00%	0.00%
Asian alone (NH)	0	0	0.00%	0.00%
Native Hawaiian or Pacific Islander alone (NH)	0	0	0.00%	0.00%
Other race alone (NH)	0	1	0.00%	0.27%
Mixed race or Multiracial (NH)	4	7	0.91%	1.87%
Hispanic or Latino (any race)	3	8	0.68%	2.14%
Total	441	374	100.00%	100.00%

=== 2010 census ===
The 2010 United States census counted 441 people, 166 households, and 126 families in the CDP. The population density was 355.8 per square mile (137.4/km^{2}). There were 180 housing units at an average density of 145.2 per square mile (56.1/km^{2}). The racial makeup was 98.19% (433) White, 0.68% (3) Black or African American, 0.00% (0) Native American, 0.00% (0) Asian, 0.00% (0) Pacific Islander, 0.23% (1) from other races, and 0.91% (4) from two or more races. Hispanic or Latino of any race were 0.68% (3) of the population.

Of the 166 households, 28.9% had children under the age of 18; 65.7% were married couples living together; 7.2% had a female householder with no husband present and 24.1% were non-families. Of all households, 21.7% were made up of individuals and 11.4% had someone living alone who was 65 years of age or older. The average household size was 2.66 and the average family size was 3.10.

21.5% of the population were under the age of 18, 7.3% from 18 to 24, 18.4% from 25 to 44, 39.0% from 45 to 64, and 13.8% who were 65 years of age or older. The median age was 46.2 years. For every 100 females, the population had 93.4 males. For every 100 females ages 18 and older there were 97.7 males.
