= Van Nest–Hoff–Vannatta Farmstead =

Historic house in New Jersey, United States

- U.S. National Register of Historic Places
- New Jersey Register of Historic Places
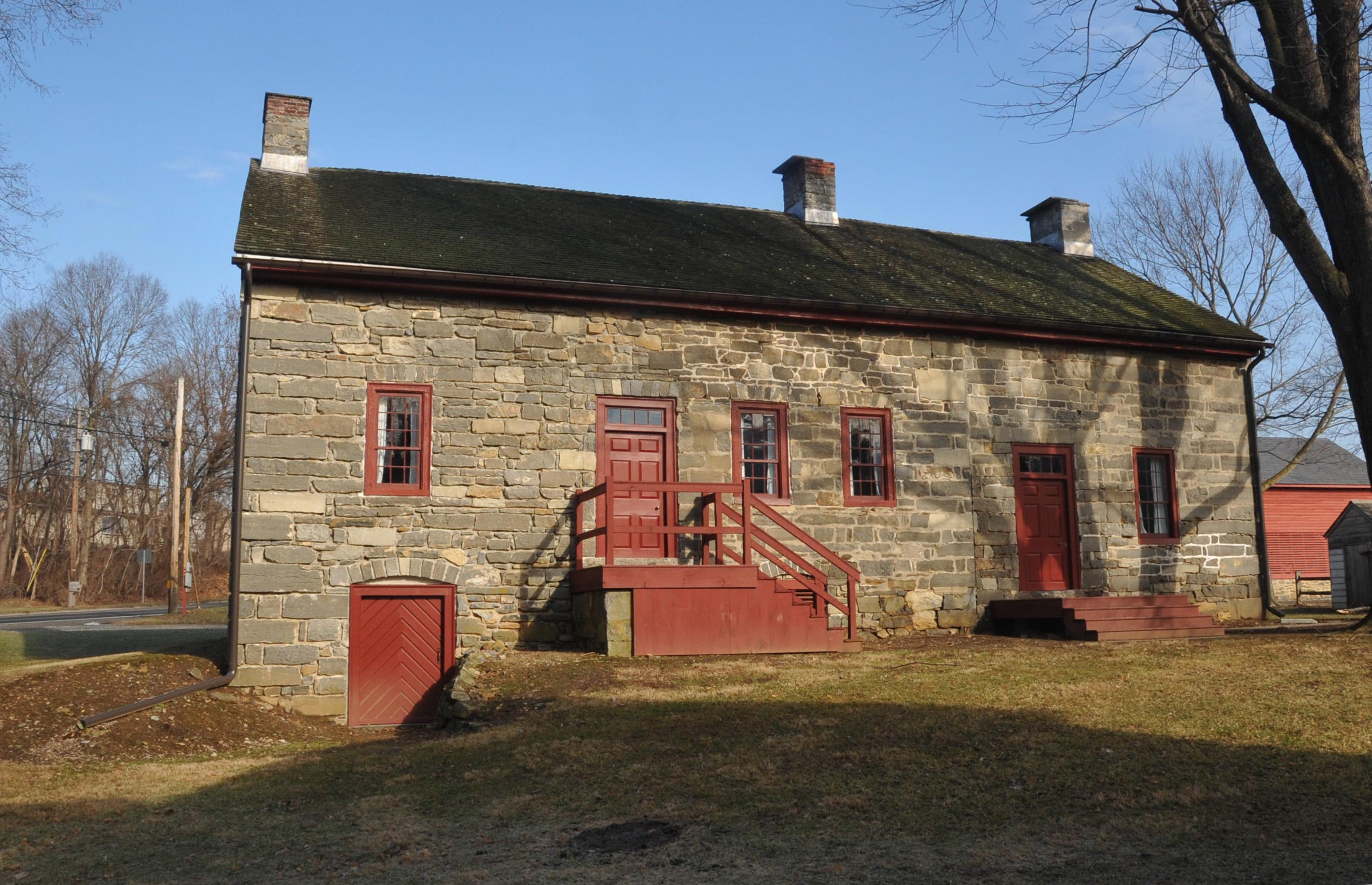

- Location within Warren County, New Jersey Location within New Jersey Location within the United States
- Location: County Route 519 (Belvidere Road); Harmony Township, New Jersey
- Coordinates: 40°45′47″N 75°07′49″W
- NRHP reference No.: 05001484
- NJRHP No.: 3965

Significant dates
- Added to NRHP: December 28, 2005
- Designated NJRHP: September 1, 2005

The Van Nest–Hoff–Vannatta Farmstead is a historic property along County Route 519 (Belvidere Road) in Harmony Township in Warren County, New Jersey, United States. It is administered by the Harmony Township Historical Society. The farmstead was added to the National Register of Historic Places on December 28, 2005, for its significance in agriculture and architecture.

The tract of 768 acres (311 ha) was first settled by John Van Nest in 1763, and subsequently owned by John and Abel Hoff during the early 19th century, followed by William M. Vannatta. In 1856, Vannatta (originally van Etten) acquired the southern half of what was by then a 590-acre (240 ha) tract containing the farmstead. Vannatta moved to the Italianate-style house overlooking the farmstead sometime in the 1860s, after which the farmstead was rented to a succession of tenant farmers. These tenant farmers included Jacob Fry in the 1860s, John Koch in the 1930s, Russell Reeder in the 1940s, and Shorty Featherman from 1945 to 1960.

== See also ==
- National Register of Historic Places listings in Warren County, New Jersey
