= Montana, New Jersey =

Populated place in Warren County, New Jersey, US

- Unincorporated community
- Location of Montana within Warren County. Inset: Location of Warren County in New Jersey. Montana, New Jersey (New Jersey) Montana, New Jersey (the United States)
- Coordinates: 40°45′54″N 75°04′03″W
- Country: United States
- State: New Jersey
- County: Warren
- Township: Harmony
- Named after: Montana Territory
- Elevation: 1,115 ft (340 m)
- Time zone: UTC−05:00 (Eastern (EST))
  - Summer (DST): UTC−04:00 (EDT)
- GNIS feature ID: 878446

Montana is an unincorporated community located in Harmony Township, in Warren County, in the U.S. state of New Jersey.

== History ==
A post office called Montana was established in 1867, and remained in operation until 1904. The community was named after the Montana Territory.
