= Brett Scharffs =

American academic

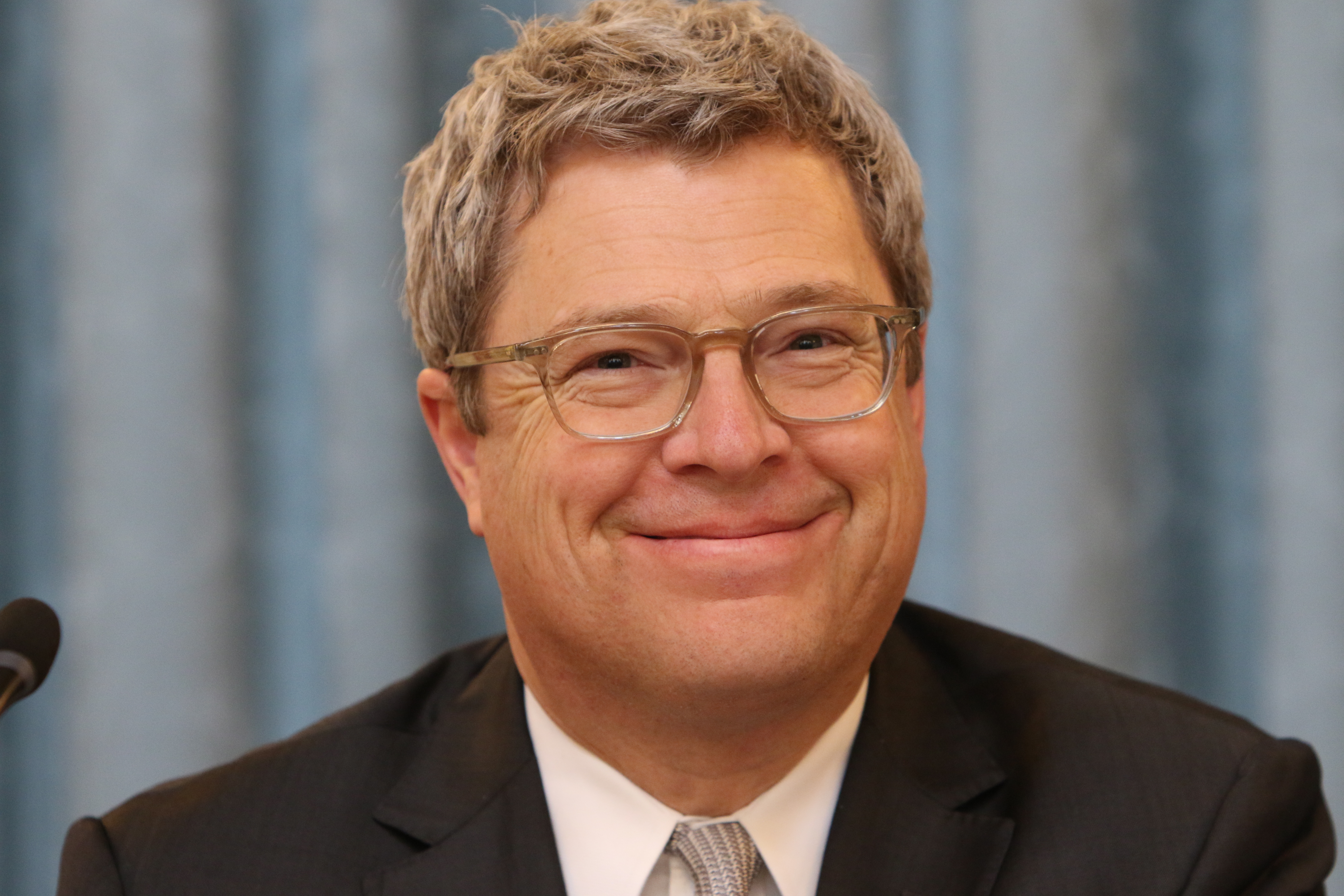
- Brett Scharffs in 2016
- Born: March 22, 1963 (age 63)
- Education: Georgetown University (BA, BS, MA); University College, Oxford (BPhil); Yale University (JD)
- Occupation: Law professor
- Employer: Brigham Young University

Brett Gilbert Scharffs (born March 22, 1963) is an American legal scholar who is the Rex E. Lee Chair and Professor of Law at the J. Reuben Clark Law School of Brigham Young University. He is also the director of the International Center for Law and Religion Studies.

== Life and career ==
Scharffs is a son of professor Gilbert W. Scharffs. He received a B.S., B.A., and M.A. from Georgetown University and then went to Oxford University as a Rhodes Scholar. He then received a J.D. from Yale Law School, where he was a senior editor of the Yale Law Journal.

Scharffs was then a law clerk for Judge David B. Sentelle of the United States Court of Appeals for the District of Columbia Circuit. Prior to joining the BYU faculty Scharffs taught at George Washington University Law School.

Scharffs has largely focused on international law and religious law issues. He has written more than one hundred articles and book chapters and made over three hundred scholarly presentations in thirty countries. He has also co-authored works with his colleague Cole Durham. He has also served as chair of the law and religion section of the Association of American Law Schools.

== Sources ==
- BYU Law School faculty profile of Scharffs
- listing of BYU Law School faculty
- list of articles by Scharffs
- Aspen Publishers bio of Scharffs
