= Hutchinson, New Jersey =

Populated place in Warren County, New Jersey, US

- Census-designated place
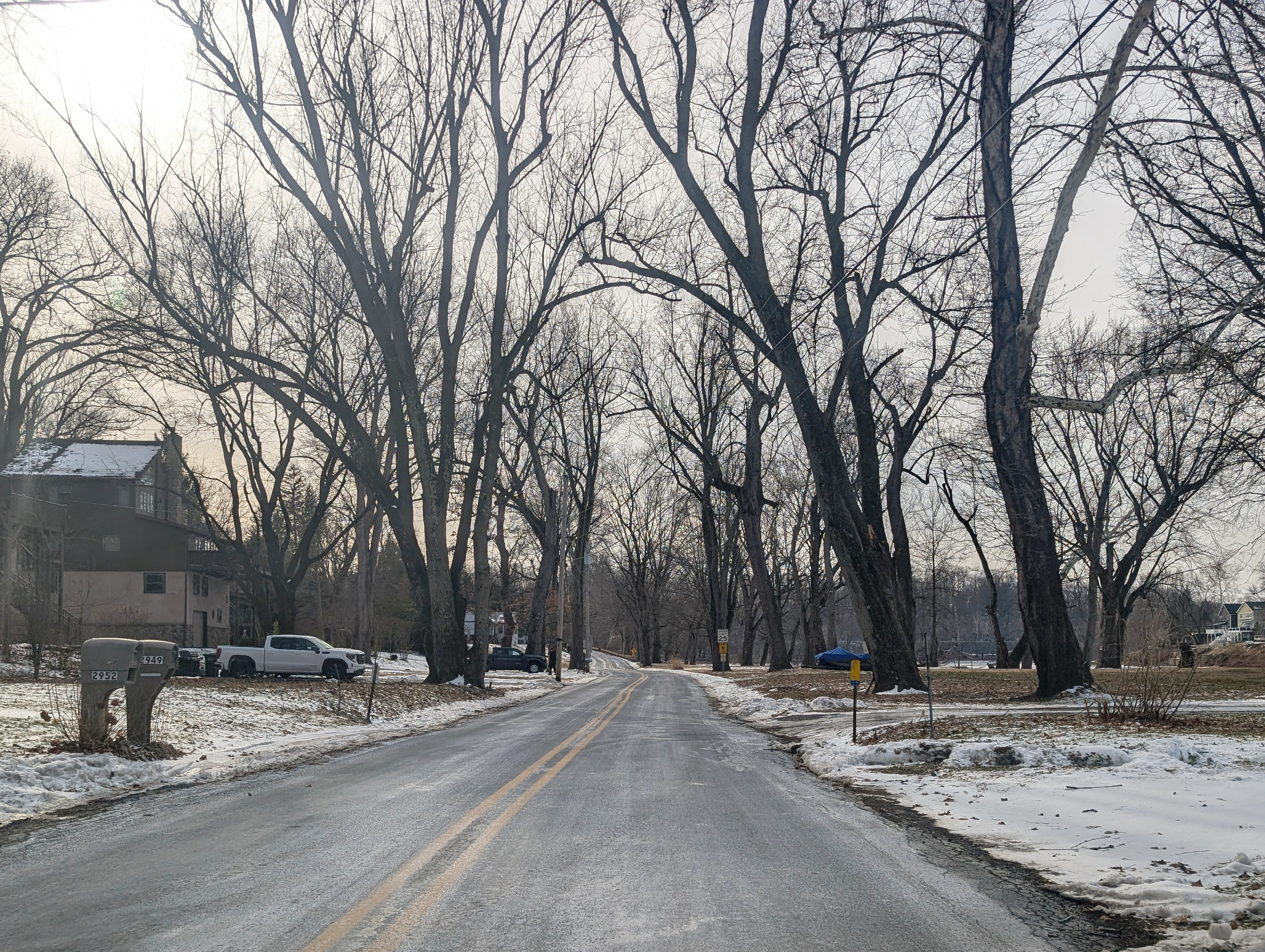
- River Road southbound through Hutchinson

- Location in Warren County Location in New Jersey Location in the United States
- Coordinates: 40.781648°N 75.124455°W
- Country: United States
- State: New Jersey
- County: Warren
- Township: Harmony

Area
  - Total: 1.06 sq mi (2.74 km^{2})
  - Land: 0.98 sq mi (2.54 km^{2})
  - Water: 0.077 sq mi (0.20 km^{2}) 30.24%
- Elevation: 223 ft (68 m)

Population (2020)
  - Total: 103
  - Density: 105.0/sq mi (40.55/km^{2})
- Time zone: UTC−05:00 (Eastern (EST))
  - Summer (DST): UTC−04:00 (EDT)
- Area code: 908
- FIPS code: 34-33690
- GNIS feature ID: 02584003

Hutchinson is an unincorporated community and census-designated place (CDP) located within Harmony Township in Warren County, in the U.S. state of New Jersey, that was defined as part of the 2010 United States census. As of the 2020 census, Hutchinson had a population of 103.

== Geography ==
According to the United States Census Bureau, the CDP had a total area of 0.198 square miles (0.513 km^{2}), including 0.138 square miles (0.358 km^{2}) of land and 0.060 square miles (0.155 km^{2}) of water (30.24%).

== Demographics ==
Historical population
Census	Pop.	Note	%±
2010	135		—
2020	103		−23.7%
U.S. Decennial Census; 2010 2020

Hutchinson first appeared as a census designated place in the 2010 U.S. census.

=== 2020 census ===
Hutchinson CDP, New Jersey – Racial and ethnic composition Note: the US Census treats Hispanic/Latino as an ethnic category. This table excludes Latinos from the racial categories and assigns them to a separate category. Hispanics/Latinos may be of any race.
Race / Ethnicity (NH = Non-Hispanic)	Pop 2010	Pop 2020	% 2010	% 2020
White alone (NH)	127	100	94.07%	97.09%
Black or African American alone (NH)	0	2	0.00%	1.94%
Native American or Alaska Native alone (NH)	3	0	2.22%	0.00%
Asian alone (NH)	0	0	0.00%	0.00%
Native Hawaiian or Pacific Islander alone (NH)	0	0	0.00%	0.00%
Other race alone (NH)	0	0	0.00%	0.00%
Mixed race or Multiracial (NH)	5	1	3.70%	0.97%
Hispanic or Latino (any race)	0	0	0.00%	0.00%
Total	135	103	100.00%	100.00%

=== 2010 census ===
The 2010 United States census counted 135 people, 54 households, and 40 families in the CDP. The population density was 976.3 per square mile (377.0/km^{2}). There were 65 housing units at an average density of 470.1 per square mile (181.5/km^{2}). The racial makeup was 94.07% (127) White, 0.00% (0) Black or African American, 2.22% (3) Native American, 0.00% (0) Asian, 0.00% (0) Pacific Islander, 0.00% (0) from other races, and 3.70% (5) from two or more races. Hispanic or Latino of any race were 0.00% (0) of the population.

Of the 54 households, 29.6% had children under the age of 18; 59.3% were married couples living together; 13.0% had a female householder with no husband present and 25.9% were non-families. Of all households, 20.4% were made up of individuals and 9.3% had someone living alone who was 65 years of age or older. The average household size was 2.50 and the average family size was 2.88.

21.5% of the population were under the age of 18, 5.2% from 18 to 24, 20.7% from 25 to 44, 34.1% from 45 to 64, and 18.5% who were 65 years of age or older. The median age was 45.9 years. For every 100 females, the population had 82.4 males. For every 100 females ages 18 and older there were 96.3 males.
