= International Center for Law and Religion Studies =

The International Center for Law and Religion Studies (ICLRS), part of the J. Reuben Clark Law School (JRCLS) at Brigham Young University (BYU), was formally founded on January 1, 2000, to promote freedom of religion worldwide and to study the relations between governments and religious organizations. The ICLRS strives to be a global academic leader in the field of international religious freedom. The ICLRS was built upon the work of law professor Cole Durham, who was named its founding director. Brett Scharffs has been the ICLRS director since May 2016.

== History ==
Cole Durham was in Berlin during the collapse of the Berlin Wall. He recognized the magnitude of the changes necessary and began consulting on law reform and constitution making throughout Eastern Europe. Previously, the field of law and religion was primarily focused in the United States. During this time, Durham organized comparative law conferences and wove together a network of experts with the purpose of sharing ideas, collaborating, and contributing to future publications.

Durham's experiences led him to launch the ICLRS to establish an institutional base for his work. The ICRLS was founded on January 1, 2000. Durham served as the founding director, alongside associate director Elizabeth Clark. In May 2016, Brett Scharffs was appointed as the ICLRS director, with Durham continuing founding director. As of 2021, the ICLRS also has five associate directors, who are assigned to specific regions of the world where they lead volunteer senior fellows and additional staff members.

== Conferences and events ==
Each October, the ICLRS hosts an International Law and Religion Symposium for government, academic, and religious leaders and visitors, with more than 90 invited delegates from approximately 50 countries. Attendees include world religious leaders; leading United Nations, European Union, and United States officials dealing with religious freedom; and academic, government, media, and civil society leaders from all around the world. Traditionally held at BYU, the Symposium was moved online temporarily in 2020 due to the COVID-19 pandemic.

Each summer, the ICLRS holds a Religious Freedom Annual Review on the BYU campus. This was established in 2014 as conference for lawyers, but has since expanded to include all who are interested in religious freedom issues and working together in a diverse space. This event is geared towards the general public and provides information and discussion on current religious freedom issues in the United States. Although typically held near the BYU campus, it was also held online in 2020, due to the COVID-19 pandemic.

Beginning in 2013, the ICLRS has collaborated with local partners to hold annual regional conferences in Africa, Latin America, the Muslim world, Asia, South Asia, Eastern and Western Europe, and the Pacific. These conferences are undertaken with local partners and allow the ICLRS to extend its work worldwide.

The ICLRS holds a conference at Oxford University annually as well as United Nations Side Events in New York and Geneva. Certificate training and other teaching programs are also offered annually in China, Vietnam, Indonesia, Oxford, Myanmar, Africa, and at Central European University in Budapest.

== Students ==
ICLRS Summer Research Fellows are selected from first-year students of the JRCLS. Student fellows spend part of the summer following their first year of law school as externs abroad and completing a guided individual research project. Fellows are assigned to work five weeks at either the Office of General Counsel at the headquarters of the Church of Jesus Christ of Latter-day Saints or in one of church's eight international area legal counsel offices.

The Symposium Executive Committee is composed of 24 JRCLS students, who work under the direction of Clark to prepare for the annual Symposium. Executive Committee students coordinate the logistical aspects of the conference and assist delegates throughout the symposium, including hosting, driving, and translation. The committee is divided into six sub-committees: master schedule, documents, interpretation and media, recruitment and volunteer coordination, transportation, concierge, and hosting.

The ICLRS Student Management Board consists of selected second and third-year JRCLS students. The Board is chosen based on their interest in law and religion as well as for expertise in research, writing, editing, languages, and website management.

== International Advisory Council ==
Members of the International Advisory Council (IAC) assist the ICLRS in promoting the cause of religious freedom worldwide. The IAC chair, David Colton, and the executive committee lead the Council in activities such as hosting international delegates to the Symposium and traveling around the world to participate in conferences. Council members also frequently travel on enrichment trips. Most recently, some members of the IAC traveled to Durban, South Africa in January 2020 for a conference on registration laws for religious communities in Africa that included academic, religious, government, and civil society leaders from 18 African nations.

== International Religious Liberty Award ==
Since 2010, the ICLRS, together with the JRCLS, has awarded the International Religious Liberty Award in recognition of outstanding contributions to the promotion and preservation of religious freedom.

Past recipients of the International Religious Liberty Award include Joe Lieberman (2010), Kevin Hasson (2011), Douglas Laycock (2012), John Graz (2013), Frank Wolf (2014), Knox Thames, William E. Lori (2015), Katrina Lantos Swett (2016), Elizabeth Berridge (2017), and David Saperstein (2018).
