= Ellen Weiss =

American journalist

- Born: January 30, 1959 (age 67); Westchester, New York
- Education: Smith College
- Occupation: Journalist
- Spouse: David Saperstein (m. 1987)

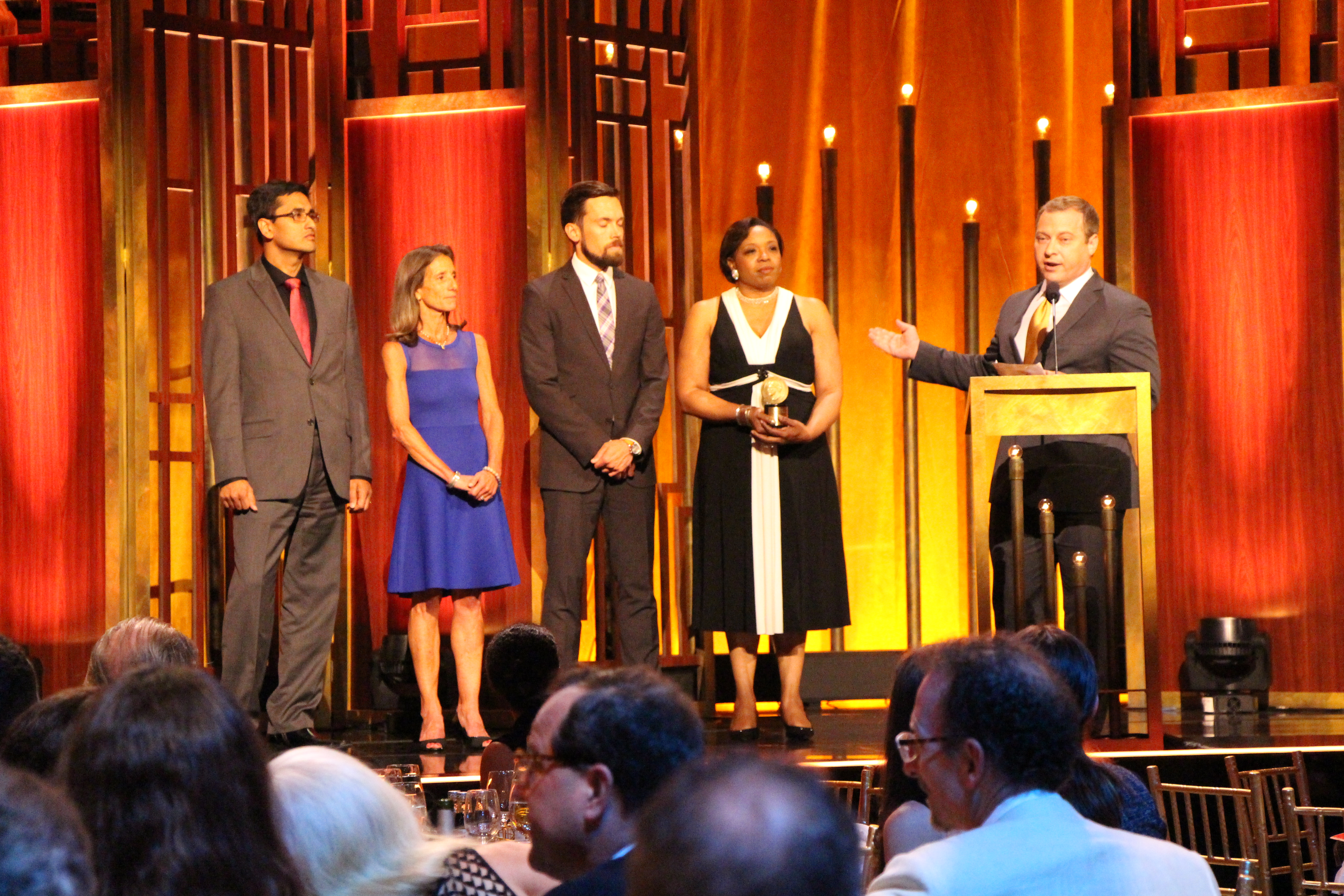
Ellen Weiss and the Scripps DC Investigative team at the 74th Annual Peabody Awards for their story “Under the Radar,” an investigative series exposing problems when convicted military sex offenders return to civilian life.

Ellen Weiss (born January 30, 1959) is an American journalist and four-time Peabody Award winner. She joined National Public Radio (NPR) in 1982, eventually running the NPR News national desk and serving as executive producer of the NPR News magazine All Things Considered. She was named NPR vice president for news in April 2007 and held that post until January 2011. She was executive editor at the nonprofit Center for Public Integrity in 2013 she became Washington, D.C., bureau chief and vice-president for the E. W. Scripps Company. In 2015, she won her fourth Peabody Award for a story about soldiers discharged from the military for sexual crimes who evade registering as sex offenders after leaving the military. Weiss currently serves as the vice president of the Fund for Investigative Journalism.

She attended Scarsdale High School in Scarsdale, New York, and is a Smith College graduate. She lives in Washington, D.C. with her husband, Rabbi David Saperstein. They are the parents of musician Daniel Saperstein.
