= Petri Salo =

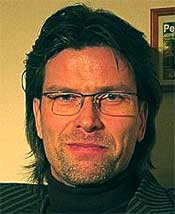
Petri Salo

Petri Salo (born March 26, 1964, in Vaasa, Finland) is a Finnish educational researcher, and public figure in adult education. He is a professor in adult education at the Åbo Akademi University, Vaasa (Finland). Previously he has worked as Assistant Professor and Professor of adult education besides his institution also at University of Tampere. From the beginning of 2007, he is the chief editor for the Finnish scientific journal Aikuiskasvatus (Adult education).

Petri Salo has visited as a guest lecturer in various universities in Finland (University of Helsinki, University of Joensuu), Scandinavia (University of Gothenburg (Gothenburg), Sweden, Norwegian University of Science and Technology Trondheim, and University of Tromsø, Tromsø, Norway), Estonia (University of Tarto), the U.S. (University of Minnesota), and Australia (Charles Sturt University, Wagga Wagga)

His studies have concentrated on the tradition and trends in Finnish and Nordic popular adult education, especially Swedish-speaking Finns' cultural and educational activities. In addition to adult education he has published in the fields of teacher education, action research, and organizational sociology.

== Major works ==
In English

- Education - Liberty, Fraternity, Equality? Nordic views on lifelong learning (co-edited with Risto Rinne & Anja Heikkinen), 2006
- Nurturing Praxis - Action Research in Partnerships Between School and University in a Nordic Light (co-edited with Karin Rönnerman & Eli Furu), 2008
- Decision-making as a Struggle and Play - On alternative rationalities in schools as organisations. Educational Management, Administration and Leadership, 36 (4), 495–510, 2008
- Action Research and the Micropolitics in Schools. Educational Action Researcher, 16 (3), 295–308. (with Tor Vidar Eilertsen and Niklas Gustafson), 2008

In Finnish

- Sivistyksellinen aikuiskasvatus (with Juha Suoranta), 2002
- Edistävä ja viihdyttävä aikuiskasvatus (Co-edited with Jukka Tuomisto), 2006
- Aikuiskasvatukse risteysasemalla. Johdatus aikuiskasvatukseen (with Juha Suoranta, Juha Kauppila, Hilkka Rekola & Marja Vanhalakka-Ruoho), 2008

In Swedish

- Skolan som mikropolitiska organisation (diss.), 2002
- Vilken utgång - folkbilding?, 2004
- Skolans sociala arkitektur, 2007
