= Elena Seiple =

American bodybuilder (born 1973)

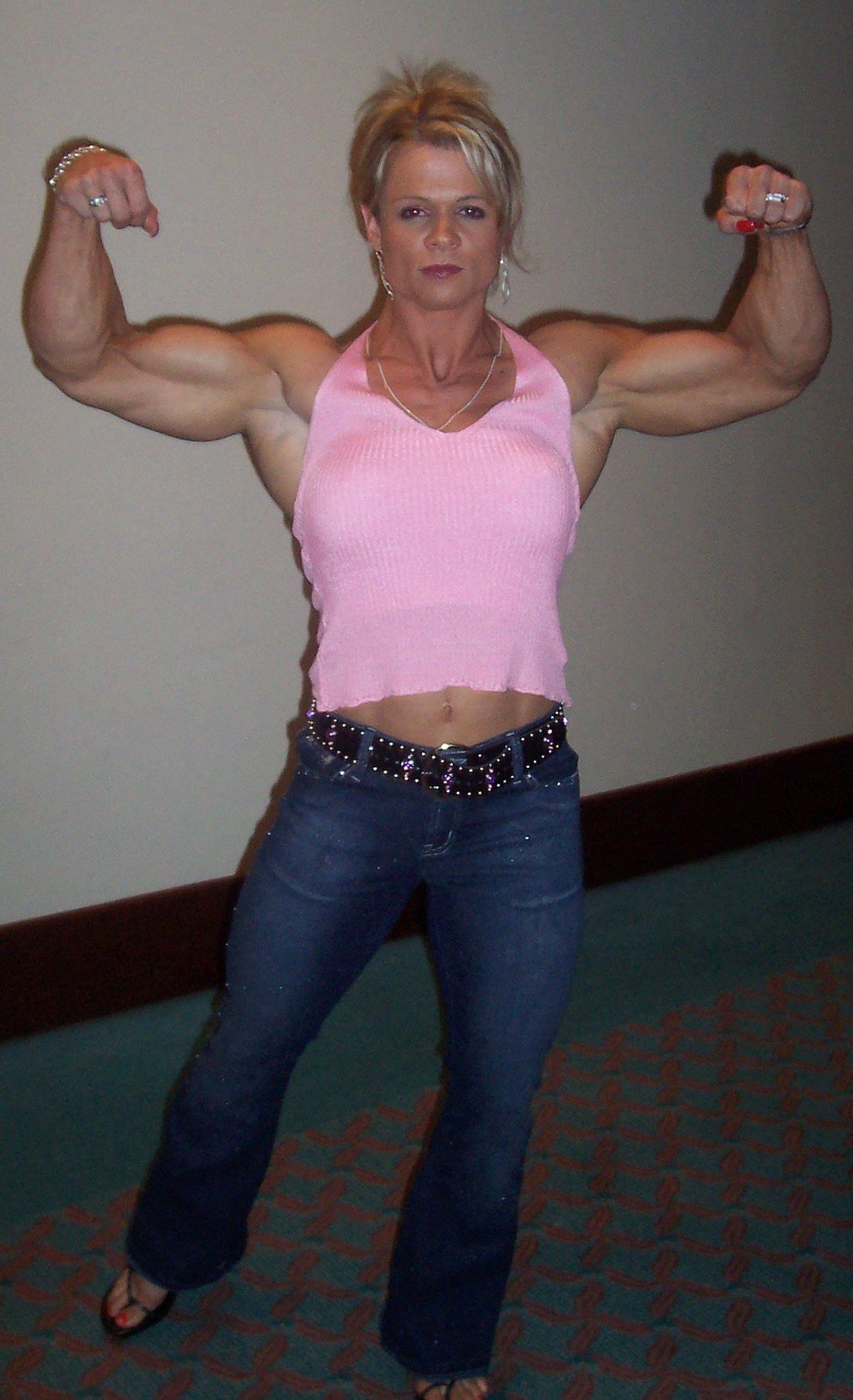
Seiple throwing up a front double biceps pose at the NPC Juniors in 2005

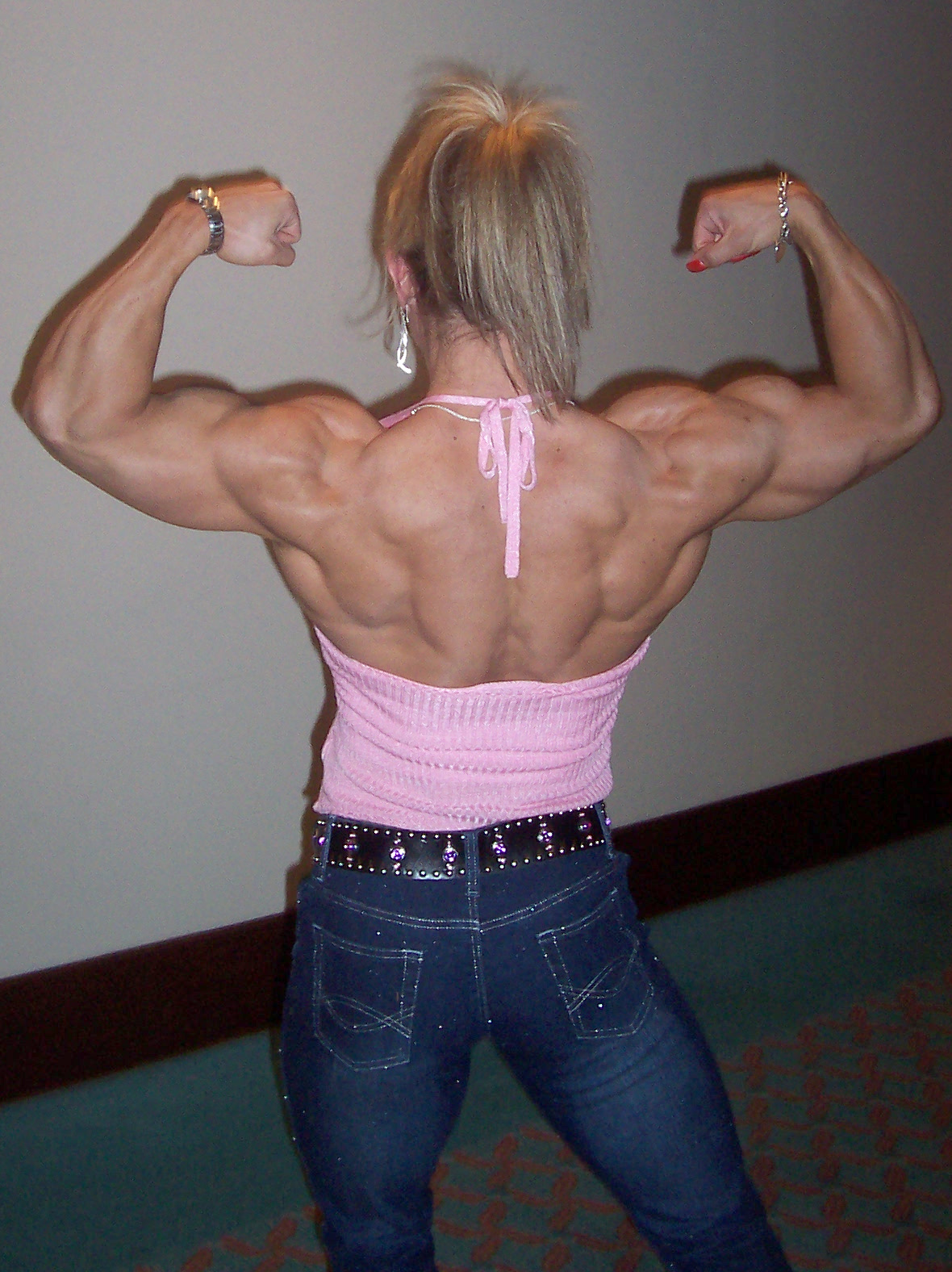
Seiple displaying a rear double biceps

Elena Seiple (born December 17, 1973) is an American bodybuilder and strongwoman.

Seiple was born in Harmony Township, New Jersey. A gifted athlete from childhood, she excelled in swimming (specifically, in the breast stroke), basketball, soccer, and track. While attending a private Christian school in Pennsylvania, she competed in men's soccer due to the absence of a women's team. Her level of play was enough to receive an athletic scholarship from Liberty University and it was during her college years she started weightlifting, drawing inspiration from women like Lenda Murray and Cory Everson.

She began her bodybuilding career at Gibson's Gym in Washington, New Jersey. She entered a NON-NPC show, the Women's Extravaganza, in 1999 at a weight of 120 lb., placing second in the Middleweight category. Other career highlights include placing 2nd at the NPC Nationals a total of four times and 3rd, three times. She competed in the 2006 World's Strongest Woman, held in Poland, placing 9th at a weight of 142 lb. Her personal bests are 500 pounds (230 kg) in the squat, 315 pounds (143 kg) in the bench press and 475 pounds (215 kg) in the deadlift.

Seiple is politically conservative and a professed Christian. In 2008, she worked as a judge for the NPC and managed the New Jersey NPC website.

As of 2022, she was employed as Chief Information Security Officer for IT company SINC.
