= United States Ambassador-at-Large for International Religious Freedom =

United States diplomat

Ambassador at Large of the United States for International Religious Freedom
- Seal of the United States Department of State
- Incumbent; Isaac Six (acting) since July 17, 2025
- Appointer: The president; with the advice and consent of the Senate
- Inaugural holder: Robert A. Seiple
- Formation: 1999
- Website: Office of International Religious Freedom

The United States ambassador-at-large for international religious freedom is the ambassador-at-large of the United States Commission on International Religious Freedom in the U.S. Department of State.

The position was created by the International Religious Freedom Act of 1998. The first ambassador at large was Bob Seiple who served from 1999 to 2001. He was succeeded by John Hanford who served from May 2002 until January 2009. Suzan Johnson Cook served in the role from May 2011 to October 2013. On July 28, 2014, President Barack Obama nominated Rabbi David Saperstein for the position. On December 15, 2014, the Senate confirmed him to the office, making him the first non-Christian to hold this post.

On July 26, 2017, the White House announced the nomination of Sam Brownback, then-governor of Kansas to fill the vacancy in the office. Five months later, the Senate had yet to hold a confirmation vote, so per Senate rules, he was required to be nominated again in 2018 in order for a vote to be held. He was confirmed to the position on January 24, 2018, on a 49–49 vote of the Senate, with Vice President Mike Pence breaking the tie in favor of Brownback.

== Ambassadors-at-large ==
| # | Image | Name | Appointment | Left office |
|---|---|---|---|---|
| 1 | | Robert A. Seiple | 1999 | 2001 |
| 2 | | John Hanford | 2002 | 2009 |
| 3 | | Suzan Johnson Cook | 2011 | 2013 |
| 4 | | David Saperstein | 2015 | 2017 |
| 5 | | Sam Brownback | 2018 | 2021 |
| 6 | | Rashad Hussain | 2022 | 2025 |
| – | | Isaac Six | July 2025 | present |

== See also ==
- Under Secretary of State for Foreign Assistance, Humanitarian Affairs, and Religious Freedom
