= Suzan Johnson Cook =

American presidential advisor, pastor, theologian, and academic

Suzan Cook
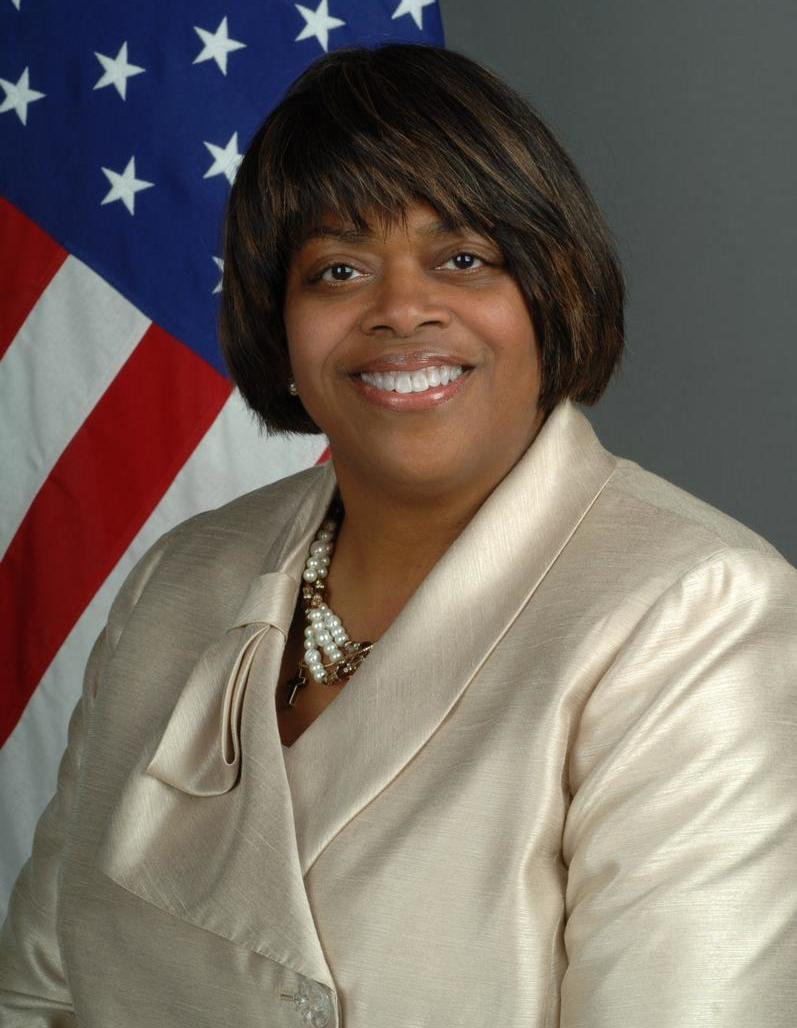

3rd United States Ambassador-at-Large for International Religious Freedom
- In office April 2011 – October 2013
- President: Barack Obama
- Preceded by: John Hanford
- Succeeded by: David Saperstein

Personal details
- Born: January 28, 1957 (age 69) New York City, New York, U.S.
- Party: Democratic
- Education: Emerson College (BA); Columbia University (MEd); Union Theological Seminary (M.Div., DDiv)

Suzan Denise Johnson Cook (born January 28, 1957) is a U.S. presidential advisor, pastor, theologian, author, activist, and academic who served as the United States Ambassador-at-Large for International Religious Freedom under The Obama Administration from April 2011 to October 2013. She has served as a policy advisor to President Bill Clinton and later to the Secretary of Housing and Urban Development Henry Cisneros, a dean and professor of communications at Harvard University, a professor of theology at New York Theological Seminary, a pastor at a number of churches, a television producer, and the author of nearly a dozen books. She was the first female senior pastor in the 200-year history of the American Baptist Churches USA, Mariners Temple Baptist Church in NYC and a close friend of Coretta Scott King. She is an honorary member of Delta Sigma Theta sorority.

== Early life and education ==
Johnson Cook was raised in Harlem and The Bronx, New York the younger of two children. Her father was one of the first black trolley drivers in New York City before opening a security agency and her mother was a public school teacher in Harlem. She and her elder brother, who went on to attend Dartmouth College, skipped grades during their school years. Johnson attended Riverdale Country Day School. Johnson graduated high school at sixteen, attending Fisk University before transferring to Emerson College, graduating in 1976 with a degree in speech. She then earned a master's degree in educational technology from Columbia University. She also received early experience in politics, helping her brother win a seat in the New York State Assembly.

She later earned another master's degree from Union Theological Seminary in 1983 and a Doctor of Ministry from United Theological Seminary in 1990. She is a graduate of the Minority Business Executive Program at the Tuck School of Business at Dartmouth College.

== Career ==
=== Early career ===
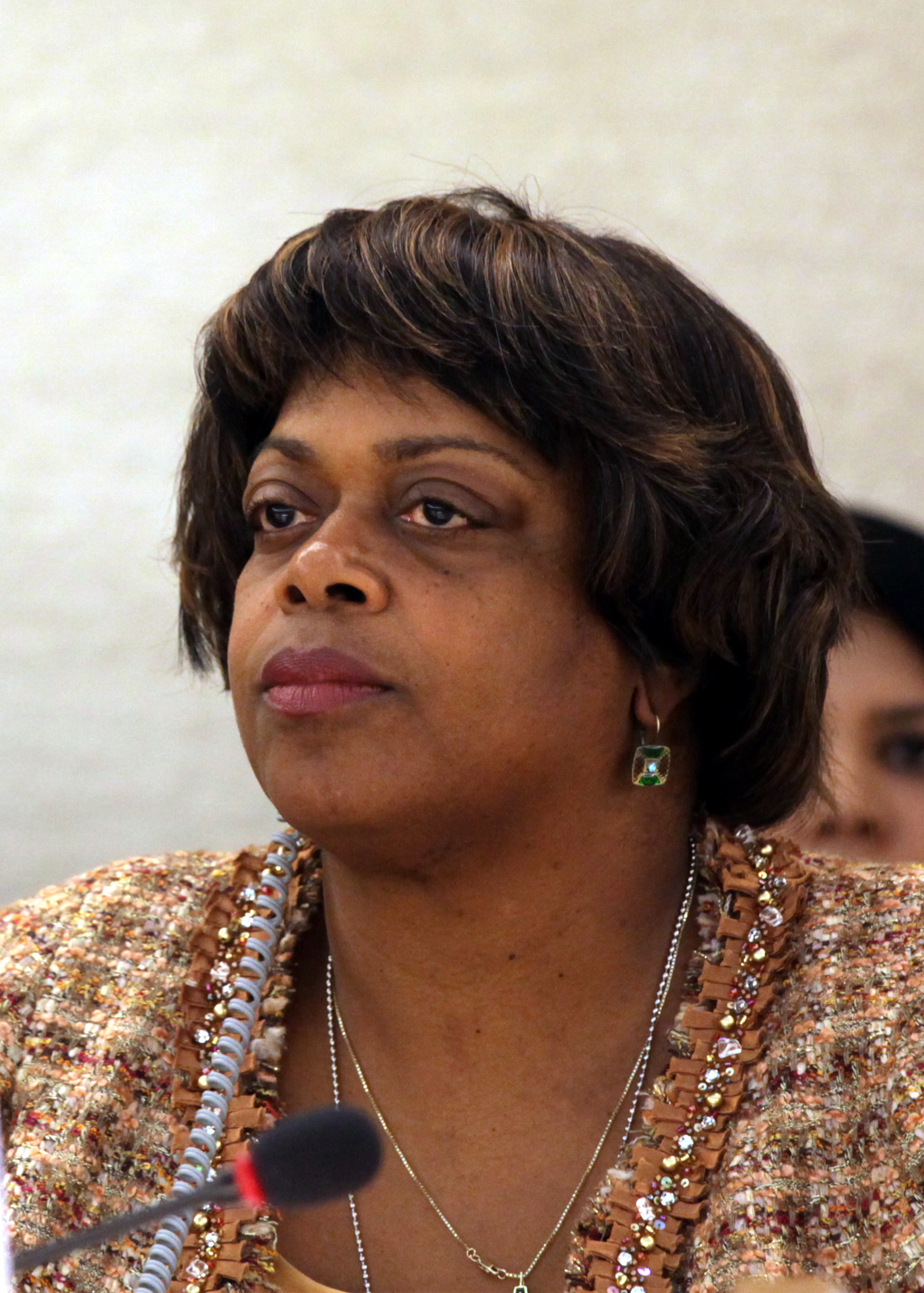
Johnson Cook in 2011

After college, Johnson began a career in television, serving as a producer for several news affiliates in Boston, Washington, and Miami before deciding to enter ministry. Johnson was ordained in 1982. She then went on to become the senior pastor at the Mariners Temple Baptist Church from 1983 to 1996.

She became the first female senior pastor in the 200-year history of the American Baptist Churches USA. In 2002, she became the first woman elected president of the Hampton University Ministers' Conference, a conference which represents all of the historically African-American denominations. Johnson became the official chaplain of the New York City Police Department, a position which she held for twenty-one years, becoming the first and only woman to hold the position.

Johnson Cook founded the Bronx Christian Fellowship Baptist Church in 1996, which she pastored until 2010. She also founded several non-profit and advocacy organization, such as the Multi-Ethnic Center Inc. She founded Moving Up Productions, a communications, leadership, and consulting firm. She taught at New York Theological Seminary from 1996 to 1998. She spent time on the faculty at Harvard University, serving as a dean and a professor teaching in the areas of speech and communications.

Johnson Cook was the goddaughter of Coretta Scott King, wife of Martin Luther King Jr. She became a close friend of Scott King, officiating her funeral. On July 13, 2013, she was initiated into Delta Sigma Theta sorority as an honorary member, during their Centennial Celebration in Washington, D.C.

=== Politics ===
In 1993 Johnson Cook was selected to become a White House Fellow. She then became an advisor to President Bill Clinton, serving as a domestic policy advisor on several issues as a member of the Domestic Policy Council. She was on the advisory team for President Clinton's One America Initiative. Following her service as a policy advisor to the president she became a consultant to Secretary of Housing and Urban Development Henry Cisneros from 1994 to 1997.

In 2016 she ran in the Democratic primary election for New York's 13th congressional district to replace retiring congressman Charles Rangel. The election was held June 28, 2016 and Johnson Cook was defeated by Adriano Espaillat. She placed sixth out of nine candidates with 2116 votes.

=== Diplomacy ===
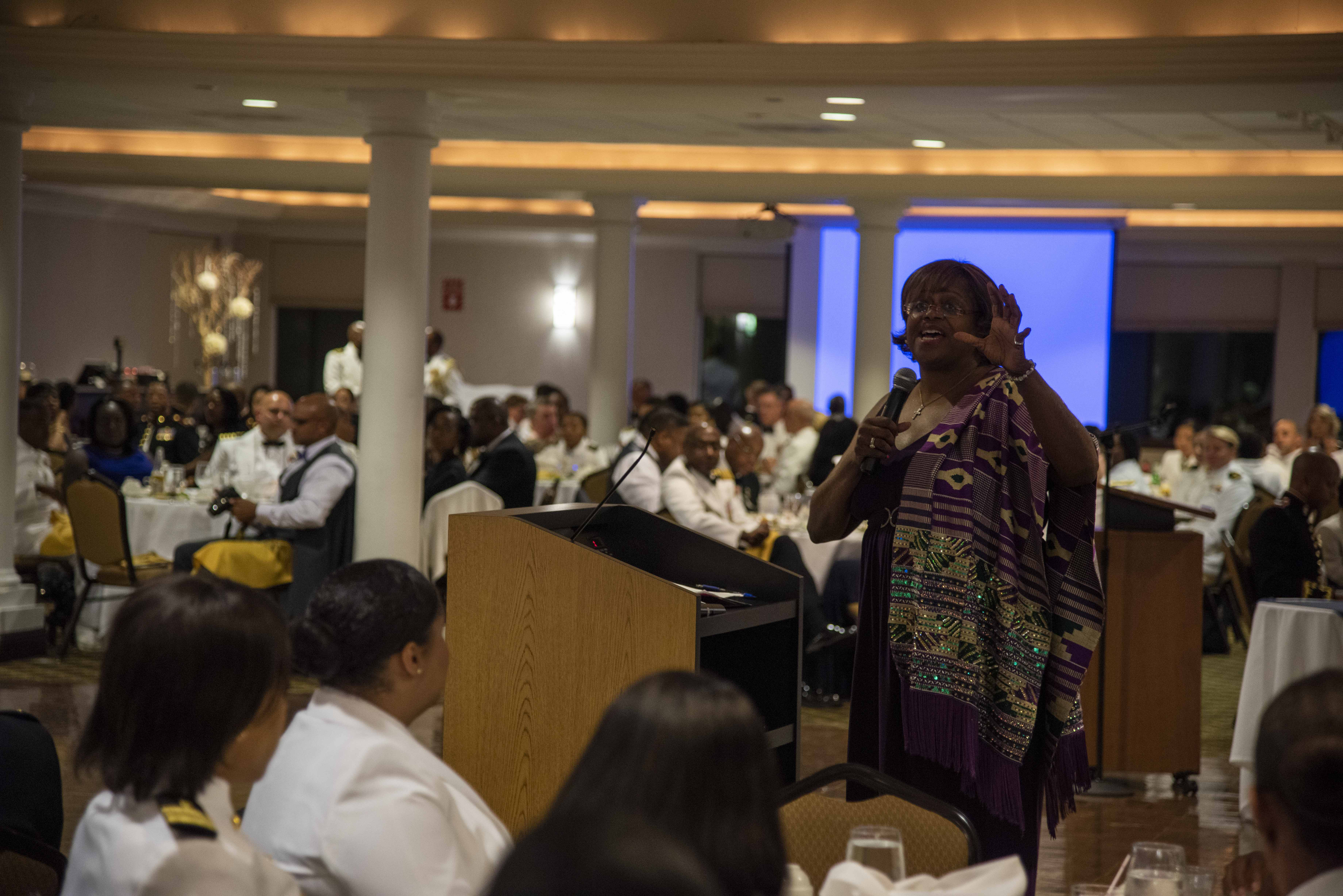
Johnson Cook speaks to the National Naval Officers Association in 2019

On June 15, 2010, she was nominated by president Barack Obama for the post of United States Ambassador-at-Large for International Religious Freedom in the State Department. However, her nomination was put on hold in the Senate and therefore expired without a vote at the end of the 111th session of Congress on January 3, 2011.

She was renominated and confirmed on April 14, 2011. She was sworn in and began work on May 16, 2011. She is the first woman and first African-American to hold the post.

According to a report in the Washington Post, Chinese officials refused to meet with her to discuss issues of religious freedom.

She resigned in October 2013 in order to earn more money in the private sector so she can give her sons the gift of a "debt-free college education."

== Personal life ==
Johnson Cook lives in New York with her husband, Ronald, and their two sons.

== Selected books ==
- Live Like You're Blessed: Simple Steps for Making Balance, Love, Energy, Spirit, Success, Encouragement and Devotion Part of Your Life, Doubleday, 2006; ISBN 978-0-385-51719-5
- Moving Up: Ten Steps to Turning Your Life Around and Getting to the Top!, Doubleday, 2008; ISBN 978-0385524292
