= Robert A. Seiple =

American ambassador

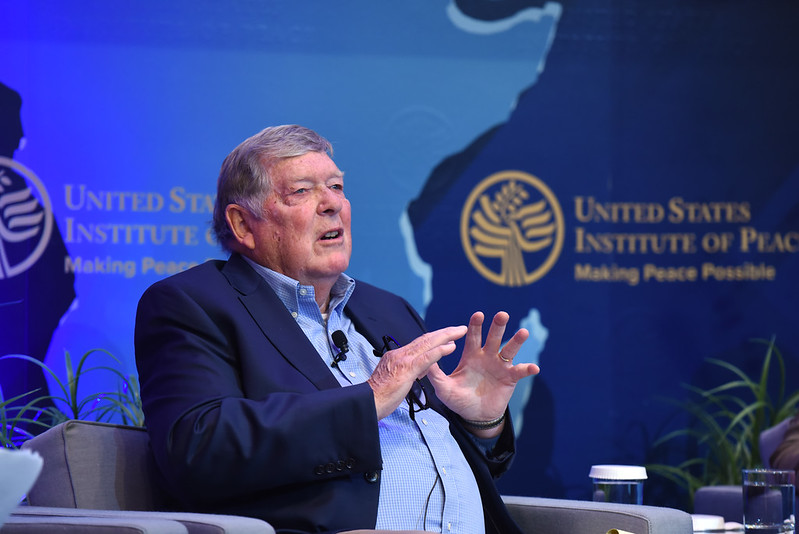
- Seiple in 2023

Biographical details
- Born: December 6, 1942 (age 83); Harmony Township, New Jersey, U.S.

Administrative career (AD unless noted)
- 1975–1979: Brown

1st United States Ambassador-at-Large for International Religious Freedom
- In office 1999–2001
- President: Bill Clinton
- Preceded by: Position established
- Succeeded by: John Hanford

Robert A. Seiple (born December 6, 1942) is an American non-profit executive, former military officer, university administrator, and diplomat. He served as the athletic director at Brown University from 1975 to 1979. Seiple was president of Eastern College, now known as Eastern University, in St. Davids, Pennsylvania and Eastern Baptist Theological Seminary, now known as Palmer Theological Seminary, in King of Prussia, Pennsylvania from 1983 to 1987. In December 1986, he was named president of World Vision International, serving from 1987 to 1998. Seiple served as the first United States Ambassador-at-Large for International Religious Freedom from 1999 to 2001, and was succeeded by John Hanford.

== Early life ==
Seiple joined the United States Marine Corps as an officer and flew combat missions as a pilot during the Vietnam War.
