= John Hanford =

U.S. ambassador for religious freedom (2002–2009)

John Van Hanford III
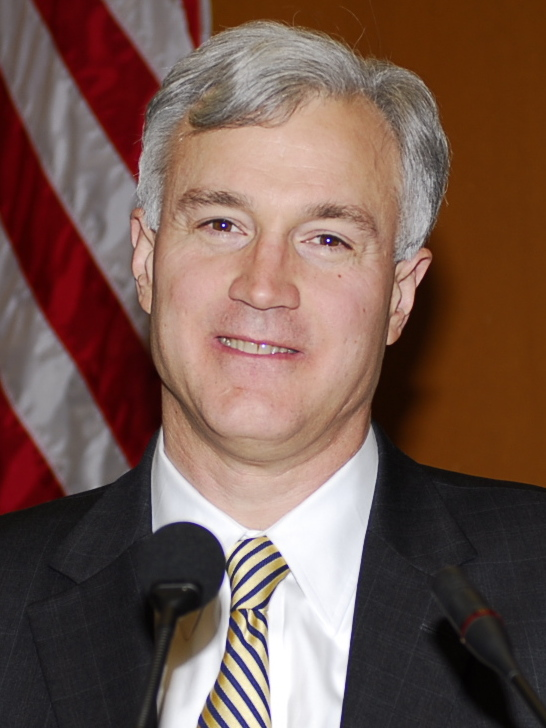

2nd United States Ambassador-at-Large for International Religious Freedom
- In office May 2002 – January 2009
- President: George W. Bush
- Preceded by: Bob Seiple
- Succeeded by: Suzan Johnson Cook

Personal details
- Born: 1954 (age 71–72)
- Party: Republican
- Education: University of North Carolina at Chapel Hill; Gordon-Conwell Theological Seminary

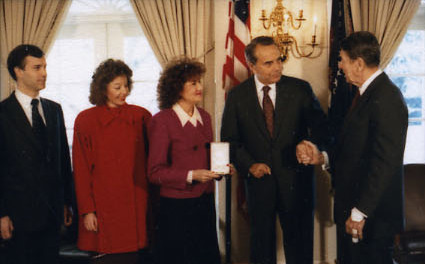
Hanford with President Ronald Reagan, Senator Bob Dole, Elizabeth Dole, and Robin Dole in 1989

John Van Hanford III (born c. 1954) was United States Ambassador-at-Large for International Religious Freedom from 2002 to 2009. As ambassador, Hanford led the Office of International Religious Freedom at the United States Department of State.

The Office of International Religious Freedom and position of Ambassador-at-Large for International Religious Freedom were created under the provisions of the International Religious Freedom Act of 1998. Hanford was the second ambassador. He was appointed to the post in May 2002 by President George W. Bush and served until 2009.

== Early life and education ==
Hanford is from Salisbury, North Carolina and is a nephew of Elizabeth Hanford Dole.

He attended the University of North Carolina at Chapel Hill on a John Motley Morehead Scholarship and earned his Bachelor of Arts in economics. He graduated from Gordon-Conwell Theological Seminary with a Master of Divinity.

== Career ==
After receiving his M.Div. from Gordon Conwell Theological Seminary in Massachusetts, where he also served as president of the student body, Hanford worked in pastoral ministry on the staff of West Hopewell Presbyterian Church in Hopewell, Virginia. He served under Dr. Timothy Keller (now best-selling author and pastor at Redeemer Presbyterian Church, New York City), and lived with the Keller family.

He then served for 14 years as an expert on international religious freedom issues, while working on the staff of Senator Richard Lugar. During this period, Hanford mobilized numerous efforts involving U.S. Senators and Representatives, Presidents and Secretaries of State to address some of the world's most severe religious persecution.

In 1998, Hanford was the chief architect of the bipartisan Congressional effort that created the US Government's permanent structures for advancing religious freedom around the world. He led a team of Congressional offices in authoring the International Religious Freedom Act (IRFA) and, with the bill's lead sponsors, guided the Act through the legislative process to a unanimous vote in both houses of Congress. IRFA created an office at the State Department led by a high-level Ambassador at Large, the annual US Report on International Religious Freedom, the United States Commission on International Religious Freedom, and an annual process to designate and sanction the most severe violators of religious freedom. IRFA is regarded by many as one of Congress's most significant legislative achievements in the area of human rights.

In May 2002, John V. Hanford III was sworn in as the second U.S. Ambassador at Large for International Religious Freedom. The Ambassador at Large is, by law, a principal advisor to the President and Secretary of State and serves as the United States' chief diplomat on issues of religious freedom worldwide. Ambassador Hanford was one of only four appointees at the Assistant Secretary level or above to serve in his position at the State Department through both terms of the Bush Administration.

Under Ambassador Hanford's leadership, the Office of International Religious Freedom more than quadrupled in size and greatly expanded its scope of operations and influence at the State Department. The Office also took on, for the first time, full responsibility for the production of the annual International Religious Freedom Report, which has come to be recognized as the "gold standard" in religious freedom reporting.

Working with the Secretary of State, Ambassador Hanford secured the addition of four new countries to the list of "Countries of Particular Concern" (CPC) under the International Religious Freedom Act: Saudi Arabia, Vietnam, Eritrea, and Uzbekistan.

Intense negotiations for improvements in religious freedom followed each of these designations. Ambassador Hanford negotiated and signed an historic Binding Agreement with the Government of Vietnam, whereby Vietnam agreed to address critical violations of religious freedom. Accordingly, Vietnam banned forced renunciations of faith, released all known religious prisoners, took measures to halt police brutality, reopened hundreds of closed churches and places of worship, passed into law new legislation granting greater religious freedom, and legalized a number of previously banned religious groups with hundreds of thousands of members. As a result of these improvements, Vietnam became the first nation to be worked off of the CPC list through diplomacy.

Similarly, negotiations with Saudi Arabia yielded the declaration of a new public statement of that nation's policies, which included a commitment to cease the publication and dissemination worldwide of any textbooks or educational materials that promote intolerance. Minority religious groups were granted freedom to meet for worship in homes and other suitable locations, and the Religious Police were to be prohibited from harassing minority religious groups.

Progress through intense diplomacy took place in numerous other nations as well, including China, Uzbekistan, and Turkmenistan.

Ambassador Hanford and his wife, Laura Hanford, have five children.
