= Cole Durham =

American educator

W. Cole Durham Jr.
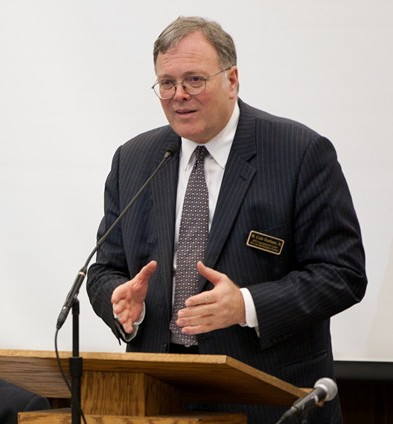
- Cole Durham, October 2010 (photo by BYU Law School Photographer, Matt Imbler)
- Born: 26 February 1948
- Education: Harvard University (AB, JD)
- Occupation: Law professor
- Employer: Brigham Young University

W. Cole Durham Jr. (born February 26, 1948) is an American educator. He is Susa Young Gates University Professor of Law and director of the International Center for Law and Religion Studies (ICLRS) at Brigham Young University's (BYU) J. Reuben Clark Law School (JRCLS). He is an internationally active specialist in religious freedom law, involved in comparative law scholarship, with a special emphasis on comparative constitutional law. In January 2009, the First Freedom Center granted him the International First Freedom Award, in Richmond, Virginia.

== Career ==
Durham is a graduate of Harvard College and Harvard Law School, where he was a Note Editor of the Harvard Law Review and Managing Editor of the Harvard International Law Journal. He is currently president of the International Consortium for Law and Religion Studies (ICLARS), based in Milan, Italy, and Co-Editor-in-Chief of the Oxford Journal of Law and Religion. From 1989 to 1994, he served as Secretary of the American Society of Comparative Law, and he is also an Associate Member of the International Academy of Comparative Law in Paris—the premier academic organization at the global level in Comparative Law. He served, along with Javier Martínez-Torrón of Complutense University of Madrid, as a General Rapporteur for the topic "Religion and the Secular State" at the 18th International Congress of Comparative Law, held in Washington, D.C., in July 2010. He has served as chair of both the Comparative Law Section and the Law and Religion Section of the Association of American Law Schools.

Durham has taught at BYU's JRCLS since 1976. He was awarded the honorary designation of University Professor there in the fall of 1999. On January 1, 2000, he was named director of the ICLRS within the JRCLS. Since 1994, Durham has been a Recurring Visiting professor of law at Central European University in Budapest, where he teaches comparative constitutional law to students from throughout Eastern Europe, and increasingly from Asia and Africa as well. He has been a guest professor in Gutenberg University in Mainz, Germany and at the University of Vienna.

== Law reform ==
Durham has been involved in constitutional drafting projects in Nepal (2011 and 2009), Thailand (2007), and Iraq (2005–06). He has worked on constitutional and statutory drafting projects throughout Eastern Europe and in most former Soviet bloc countries. He has been active in matters involving relations between religion and the state, though he also has extensive experience with comparative criminal law and non-profit law. He served for many years as a member of the Organization for Security and Co-operation in Europe/Office for Democratic Institutions and Human Rights’s Advisory Council on Freedom of Religion or Belief. He is Vice President of the International Academy for Freedom of Religion and Belief. He serves as a board member of church-state centers at DePaul and Baylor universities, of the International Religious Liberty Association, and of the International Advisory Board of the Oslo Coalition on Freedom of Religion or Belief.

Durham also works on laws governing the civil society sector, having served as chairman of the Board of the International Center for Not-for-Profit Law in Washington, D.C., and also served on its board for several years. Durham has played a role in advising governments throughout much of the former socialist bloc on constitutional provisions and legislation dealing with criminal law and procedure, court structure, general constitutional issues, and the law of associations, including particularly religious associations. Durham has studied religious law in many parts of eastern Europe, and in countries such as Bulgaria he made public statements intended to halt the enactment of laws that would have negative effects on religious liberty.

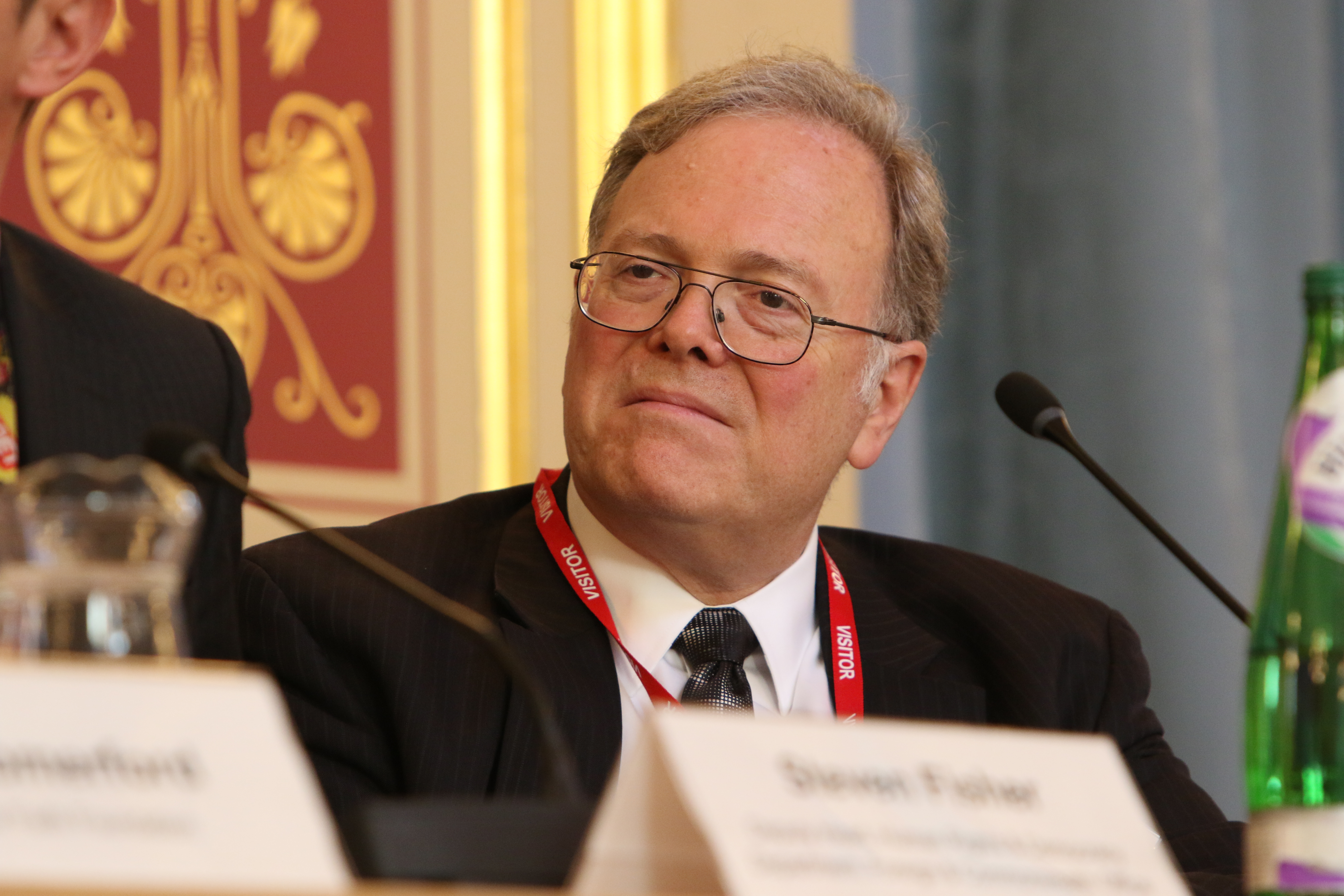
Durham participates at a summit on freedom of religion at the Foreign & Commonwealth Office in London on October 20, 2016.

Durham has helped organize technical assistance to law reform projects and comparative law conferences in many countries around the world. In the United States, Durham organized a series of conferences on comparative law issues at BYU, which have brought together some 850 scholars and experts dealing with comparative constitutional law themes from more than 100 countries.

Durham has testified before the U.S. Congress on religious intolerance in Europe and on the Religious Liberty Protection Act.

In the wake of the United States Supreme Court ruling in Employment Division v. Smith, Durham testified to the House Judiciary Committee on its negative effects.

In March 2010, Durham testified via video conference during hearings before the Constitutional Court of Indonesia concerning proposed revision of Indonesia's 1965 blasphemy law.

In June 2011, Durham and his ICLRS colleagues filed an amicus brief in the U.S. Supreme Court case concerning the hiring practices of a Lutheran church school.

== Publications ==
- Durham is co-author with Brett Scharffs of Religion and the Law: National, International, and Comparative Perspectives.
- Durham is co-author with William Bassett and Robert Smith of Religious Organizations of the Law, an annually updated treatise that is published by Thomson Reuters/West.
- Durham is co-editor with Noel Reynolds of Religious Liberty in Western Thought.
- Durham is co-editor with Silvio Ferrari and Elizabeth Clark of Law and Religion in Post-Communist Europe.
- Durham is co-editor of Facilitating Freedom of Religion or Belief: A Deskbook.
- Durham is co-editor of Religious Organizations in the United States.
- Durham has authored numerous law review articles dealing with religious liberty and other comparative law themes, and has supervised publication of dozens of articles arising from conferences and symposia.

== Personal life ==
Durham is a member of the Church of Jesus Christ of Latter-day Saints. As a young man he served a mission for the church in Germany. He is married to Louise Gardiner and they are the parents of four children.
