= Economic history of the United States =

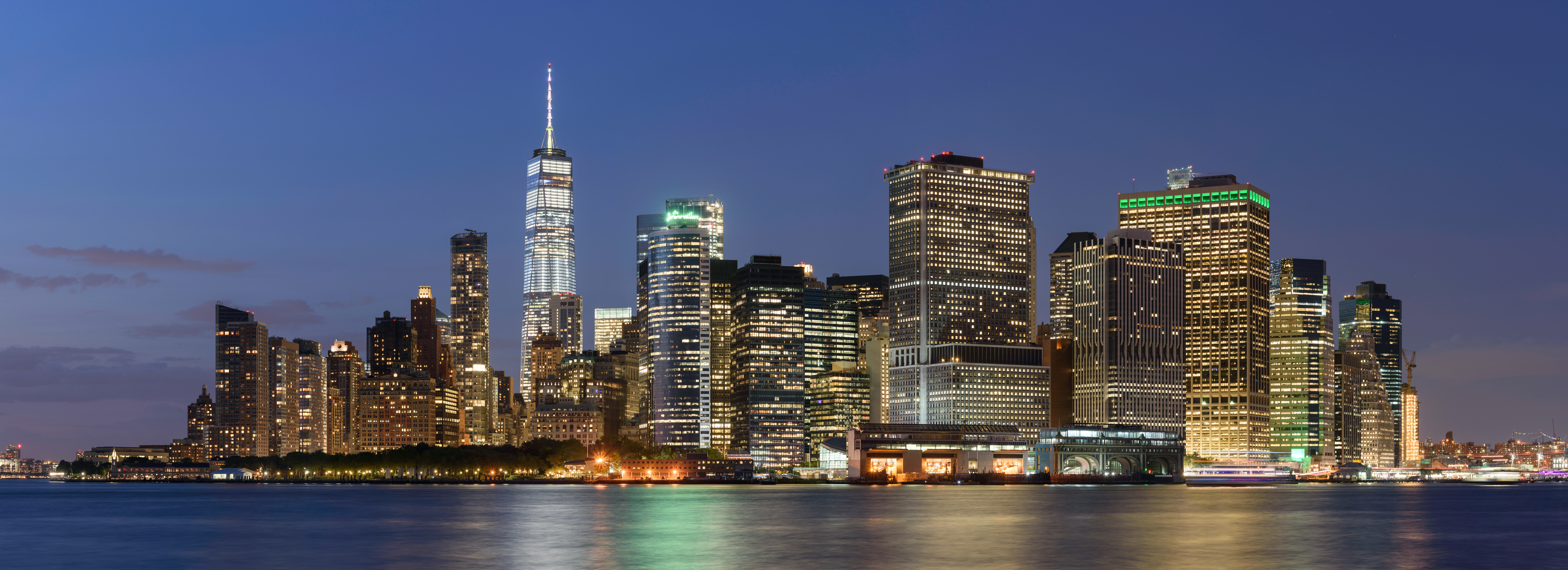
New York City, the world's principal financial center and the epicenter of the principal American metropolitan economy

The economic history of the United States encompasses economic activity in the territory that became the United States from the pre-colonial period to the present. Before European colonization, Indigenous communities had diverse economies based on agriculture, hunting, gathering, and extensive trade networks. The colonial economy was largely agricultural and pre-industrial, with trade in agricultural products and natural resources playing an important role. After independence, the Constitution established a national common market, while population growth, westward expansion, and improvements in transportation helped integrate regional economies and expand domestic commerce.

During the 19th century, the United States developed from a predominantly agricultural economy into an increasingly industrial one. Canals, steamboats, railroads, and the telegraph reduced transportation and communication costs and facilitated western settlement and the growth of national markets. Industrialization was concentrated initially in the Northeast, while the South depended heavily on plantation agriculture, particularly cotton, tobacco, and sugar produced with slave labor. The American Civil War abolished slavery and devastated much of the Southern economy, while industrial development continued in the North. In the decades after the war, rapid expansion of railroads, large-scale manufacturing, corporations, and technologies associated with the Second Industrial Revolution transformed the economy; by 1895, the United States had surpassed Britain in manufacturing output.

In the early 20th century, electrification, mass production, automobiles, and other technological changes contributed to substantial productivity growth. The economic expansion of the 1920s ended with the Wall Street Crash of 1929 and the Great Depression, during which unemployment reached about 25 percent. The federal government's role in the economy expanded under the New Deal, particularly through relief and public-works programs. Mobilization for World War II brought rapid industrial growth and sharply reduced unemployment. From 1945 to the early 1970s, the United States experienced sustained growth in output, productivity, and the size of the middle class, accompanied by continued urbanization and suburbanization.

The postwar expansion ended in the early 1970s amid slower productivity growth, oil shocks, inflation, and stagflation. Manufacturing subsequently declined as a share of employment and output while the service sector expanded, and deregulation became increasingly important from the late 1970s. The 21st century has included the early 2000s recession, the housing and financial crises that produced the Great Recession, the growth of gig work, and the economic disruption associated with the COVID-19 pandemic.

== Pre-colonial economy ==
Prior to the European settlement and conquest of North America, Indigenous communities led a variety of economic lifestyles. Some were primarily agrarian whereas others prioritized hunting, gathering and foraging. While some early scholarship characterized these communities as non-market, more recent scholarship has made note of substantial and wide-ranging trade networks.

In particular, much of the Mississippian drainage basin was characterized by settled agriculture and large towns in the pre-colonial period. According to a 2023 study, the plains were dominated by "organized, complex agricultural communities with settled populations that had opened and cleared land, domesticated plants, crafted irrigation systems, and determined the best rotation and fallow practices for a given region." These economies were devastated by pandemics spread through trade, experiencing massive population loss even in communities without direct contact with Europeans Native American disease and epidemics.

== Colonial economy ==
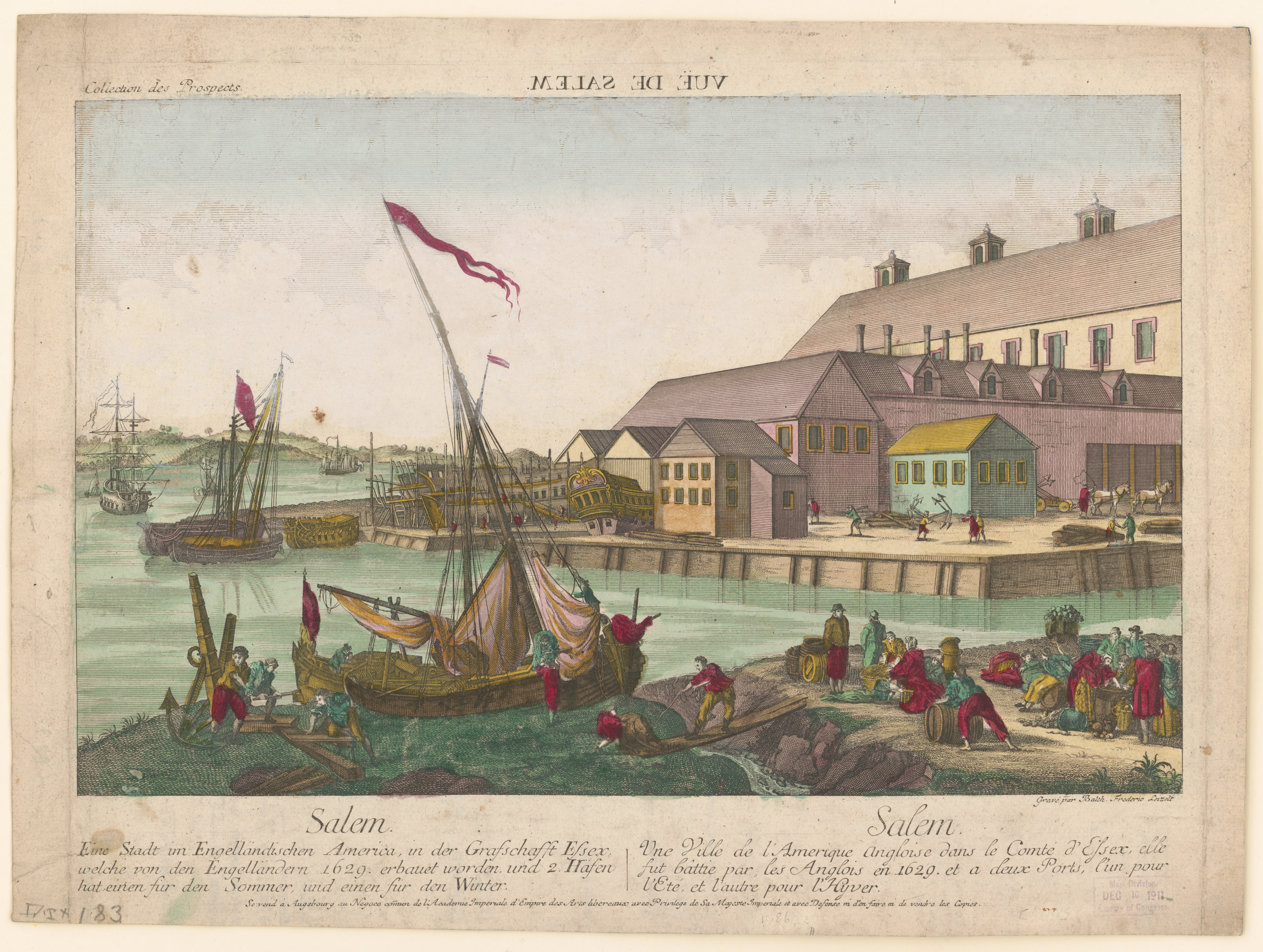
Shipping scene in Salem, Massachusetts, a shipping hub, in the 1770s

The colonial economy of what would become the United States was pre-industrial, primarily characterized by subsistence farming. Farm households also were engaged in handicraft production, mostly for home consumption, but with some goods sold. The colonial economy had an abundance of land and natural resources, and a severe scarcity of labor. This was the opposite of Europe and attracted immigrants despite the high death rate caused by New World diseases. From 1700 to 1774, the output of the thirteen colonies increased 12-fold, giving the colonies an economy about 30% the size of Britain's at the time of independence.

Population growth was responsible for over three-quarters of the economic growth of the British American colonies. The free white population had the highest standard of living in the world. There was little change in productivity and little in the way of introduction of new goods and services. Under the mercantilist system, Britain restricted the products that could be made in the colonies, and imposed high protective tariffs and other restrictions on trade outside the British Empire.

The market economy was based on extracting and processing natural resources and agricultural products for local consumption, such as mining, gristmills and sawmills, and the export of agricultural products. The most important agricultural exports were raw and processed feed grains (wheat, Indian corn, rice, bread and flour) and tobacco. Tobacco was a major crop in the Chesapeake Colonies and rice a major crop in South Carolina. Dried and salted fish was also a significant export. North Carolina was the leading producer of naval stores, which included turpentine (used for lamps), rosin (candles and soap), tar (rope and wood preservative) and pitch (ships' hulls). Another export was potash, which was derived from hardwood ashes and was used as a fertilizer and for making soap and glass.

The colonies depended on Britain for a number of finished goods, partly because laws such as the Navigation Act 1660 prohibited making many types of finished goods in the colonies. These laws achieved the intended purpose of creating a trade surplus for Britain. The colonial balance of trade in goods heavily favored Britain; however, American shippers offset roughly half of the goods trade deficit with revenues earned by shipping between ports within the British Empire.

The largest non-agricultural segment was ship building, which was from 5 to 20% of total employment. About 45% of American made ships were sold to foreigners.

Exports and related services accounted for about one-sixth of income in the decade before revolution. Just before the revolution, tobacco was about a quarter of the value of exports. Also at the time of the revolution the colonies produced about 15% of world iron, although the value of exported iron was small compared to grains and tobacco. The mined American iron ores at that time were not large deposits and were not all of high quality; however, the huge forests provided adequate wood for making charcoal. Wood in Britain was becoming scarce and coke was beginning to be substituted for charcoal; however, coke made inferior iron. Britain encouraged colonial production of pig and bar iron, but banned construction of new colonial iron fabrication shops in 1750; however, the ban was mostly ignored by the colonists.

Settlement was sparse during the colonial period and transportation was severely limited by lack of improved roads. Towns were located on or near the coasts or navigable inland waterways. Even on improved roads, which were rare during the colonial period, wagon transport was expensive. Economical distance for transporting low value agricultural commodities to navigable waterways varied but was limited to something on the order of less than 25 miles. In the few small cities and among the larger plantations of South Carolina, and Virginia, some necessities and virtually all luxuries were imported in return for tobacco, rice, and indigo exports.

=== New England ===
The New England region's economy grew steadily over the entire colonial era, despite the lack of a staple crop that could be exported. All the provinces and a number of towns as well, tried to foster economic growth by subsidizing projects that improved the infrastructure, such as roads, bridges, inns and ferries. They gave bounties and subsidies or monopolies to sawmills, grist mills, iron mills, pulling mills (which treated cloth), salt works and glassworks. Most importantly, colonial legislatures set up a legal system that was conducive to business enterprise by resolving disputes, enforcing contracts, and protecting property rights. Hard work and entrepreneurship characterized the region, as the Puritans and Yankees endorsed the "Protestant Ethic", which enjoined men to work hard as part of their divine calling.

The benefits of growth were widely distributed in New England, reaching from merchants to farmers to hired laborers. The rapidly growing population led to shortages of good farm land on which young families could establish themselves; one result was to delay marriage, and another was to move to new lands farther west. In the towns and cities, there was strong entrepreneurship, and a steady increase in the specialization of labor. Wages for men went up steadily before 1775; new occupations were opening for women, including weaving, teaching, and tailoring. The region bordered New France, and in the numerous wars the British poured money in to purchase supplies, build roads and pay colonial soldiers. The coastal ports began to specialize in fishing, international trade and shipbuilding—and after 1780 in whaling. Combined with growing urban markets for farm products, these factors allowed the economy to flourish despite the lack of technological innovation.

The Connecticut economy began with subsistence farming in the 17th century, and developed with greater diversity and an increased focus on production for distant markets, especially the British colonies in the Caribbean. The American Revolution cut off imports from Britain, and stimulated a manufacturing sector that made heavy use of the entrepreneurship and mechanical skills of the people. In the second half of the 18th century, difficulties arose from the shortage of good farmland, periodic money problems, and downward price pressures in the export market. The colonial government from time to time attempted to promote various commodities such as hemp, potash, and lumber as export items to bolster its economy and improve its balance of trade with Great Britain.

=== Urban centers ===
Historian Carl Bridenbaugh examined in depth five key cities: Boston (population 16,000 in 1760), Newport Rhode Island (population 7500), New York City (population 18,000), Philadelphia (population 23,000), and Charles Town (Charlestown, South Carolina), (population 8000). He argues they grew from small villages to take major leadership roles in promoting trade, land speculation, immigration, and prosperity, and in disseminating the ideas of the Enlightenment, and new methods in medicine and technology. Furthermore, they sponsored a consumer taste for English amenities, developed a distinctly American educational system, and began systems for care of people in need.

On the eve of the Revolution, 95 percent of the American population lived outside the cities—much to the frustration of the British, who captured the cities with their Royal Navy, but lacked the manpower to occupy and subdue the countryside. In explaining the importance of the cities in shaping the American Revolution, Benjamin Carp compares the important role of waterfront workers, taverns, churches, kinship networks, and local politics. Historian Gary B. Nash emphasizes the role of the working class, and their distrust of their social superiors in northern ports. He argues that working class artisans and skilled craftsmen made up a radical element in Philadelphia that took control of the city starting about 1770 and promoted a radical Democratic form of government during the revolution. They held power for a while, and used their control of the local militia to disseminate their ideology to the working class, and to stay in power until the businessmen staged a conservative counterrevolution.

=== Political environment ===
The colonial economies of the world operated under the economic philosophy of mercantilism, a policy by which countries attempted to run a trade surplus, with their own colonies or other countries, to accumulate gold reserves. Colonies were used as suppliers of raw materials and as markets for manufactured goods while being prohibited from engaging in most types of manufacturing. The colonial powers of England, France, Spain and the Dutch Republic tried to protect their investments in colonial ventures by limiting trade between each other's colonies.

The Spanish Empire clung to old style mercantilism, primarily concerned with enriching the Spanish government by accumulating gold and silver, mainly from mines in their colonies. The Dutch and particularly the British approach was more conducive to private business.

The Navigation Acts, passed by the British Parliament between 1651 and 1673, affected the British American colonies. Important features of the Navigation Acts included:

- Foreign vessels were excluded from carrying trade between ports within the British Empire
- Manufactured goods from Europe to the colonies had to pass through England
- Enumerated items, which included furs, ship masts, rice, indigo and tobacco, were only allowed to be exported to Great Britain.

Although the Navigation Acts were enforced, they had a negligible effect on commerce and profitability of trade. In 1770 illegal exports and smuggling to the West Indies and Europe were about equal to exports to Britain.

The domestic economy of the British American colonies enjoyed a great deal of freedom, although some of their freedom was due to lack of enforcement of British regulations on commerce and industry. Adam Smith used the colonies as an example of the benefits of free enterprise. Colonists paid minimal taxes.

Some colonies, such as Virginia, were founded principally as business ventures. England's success at establishing settlements on the North American coastline was due in large part to its use of charter companies. Charter companies were groups of stockholders (usually merchants and wealthy landowners) who sought personal economic gain and, perhaps, wanted also to advance England's national goals. While the private sector financed the companies, the king also provided each project with a charter or grant conferring economic rights as well as political and judicial authority. The colonies did not show profits, however, and the disappointed English investors often turned over their colonial charters to the settlers. The political implications, although not realized at the time, were enormous. The colonists were left to build their own governments and their own economy.

The colonial governments had few expenses and taxes were minimal. Although the colonies provided an export market for finished goods made in Britain or sourced by British merchants and shipped from Britain, the British incurred the expenses of providing protection against piracy by the British Navy and other military expenses. In the 1760s the London government raised small sums by new taxes on the colonies. This occasioned an enormous uproar, from which historians date the origins of the American Revolution. The issue was not the amount of the taxes—they were quite small—but rather the constitutional authority of Parliament versus the colonial assemblies to vote taxes. New taxes included the Sugar Act of 1764, the Stamp Act of 1765 and taxes on tea and other colonial imports. Historians have debated about the cost imposed by the Navigation Acts, which were less visible and rarely complained about. However, by 1995, the consensus view among economic historians and economists was that the "costs imposed on [American] colonists by the trade restrictions of the Navigation Acts were small."

=== American Revolution ===
Americans in the Thirteen Colonies demanded their rights as Englishmen, as they saw it, to select their own representatives to govern and tax themselves – which Britain refused. The Americans attempted resistance through boycotts of British manufactured items, but the British responded with a rejection of American rights and the Intolerable Acts of 1774. In turn, the Americans launched the American Revolution, resulting in an all-out war against the British and independence for the new United States of America. The British tried to weaken the American economy with a blockade of all ports by the Prohibitory Act 1776, but with 90% of the people in farming, and only 10% in cities, the American economy proved resilient and able to support a sustained war, which lasted from 1775 to 1783.

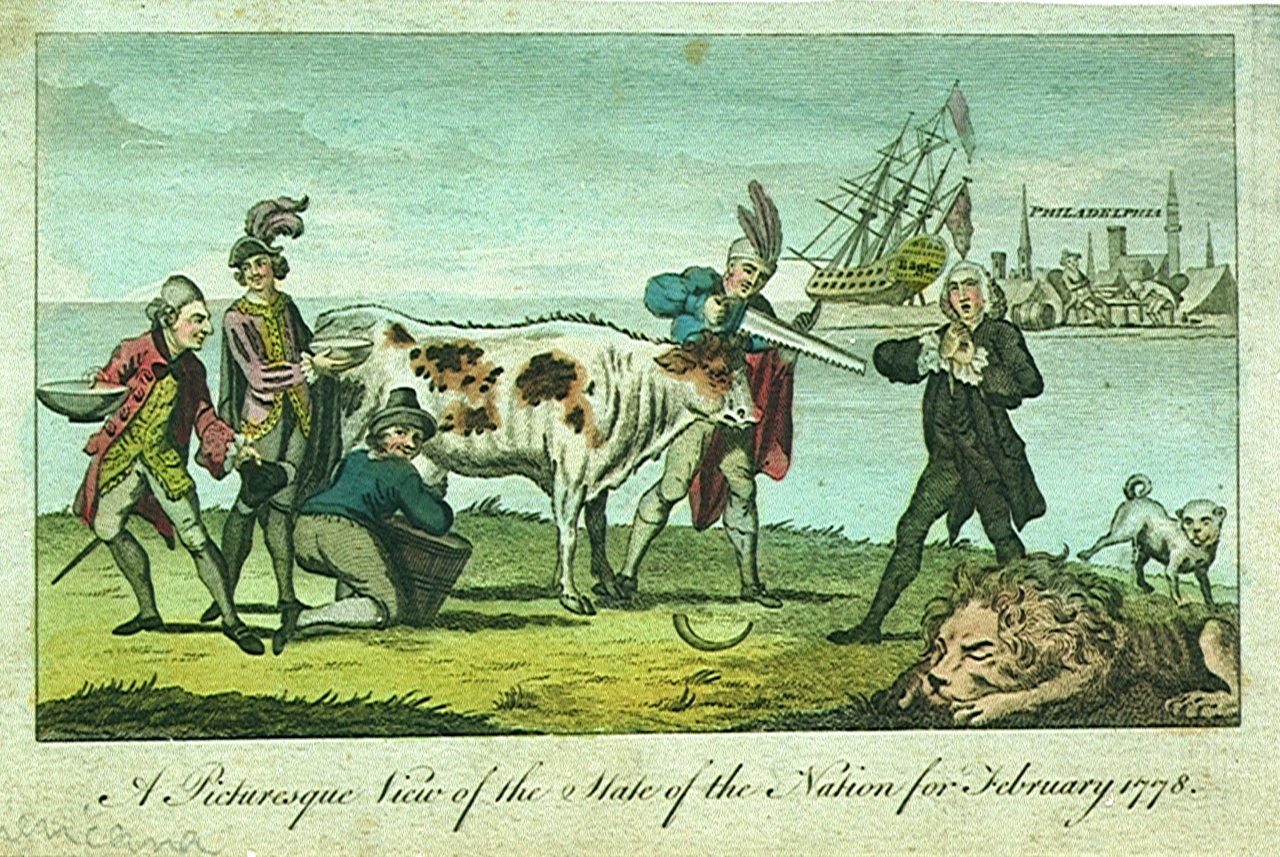
Revolutionary era cartoon showing US sawing off the horn of a cow (symbolizing a break from British commerce) with a distressed Englishman watching as other European powers wait to collect milk. The cartoon represents the commercial status of the US during the Revolution.

Congress and the American states had difficulty financing the war. In 1775 there was at most 12 million dollars in gold in the colonies, not nearly enough to cover existing transactions, let alone on a major war. The British government made the situation much worse by imposing a tight blockade on every American port, which cut off almost all imports and exports. One partial solution was to rely on volunteer support from militiamen, and donations from patriotic citizens. Another was to delay actual payments, pay soldiers and suppliers in depreciated currency, and promise it would be made good after the war. Indeed, in 1783 the soldiers and officers were given land grants to cover the wages they had earned but had not been paid during the war. Not until 1781, when Robert Morris was named Superintendent of Finance of the United States, did the national government have a strong leader in financial matters. Morris used a French loan in 1782 to set up the private Bank of North America to finance the war. Seeking greater efficiency, Morris reduced the civil list, saved money by using competitive bidding for contracts, tightened accounting procedures, and demanded the federal government's full share of money and supplies from the states.

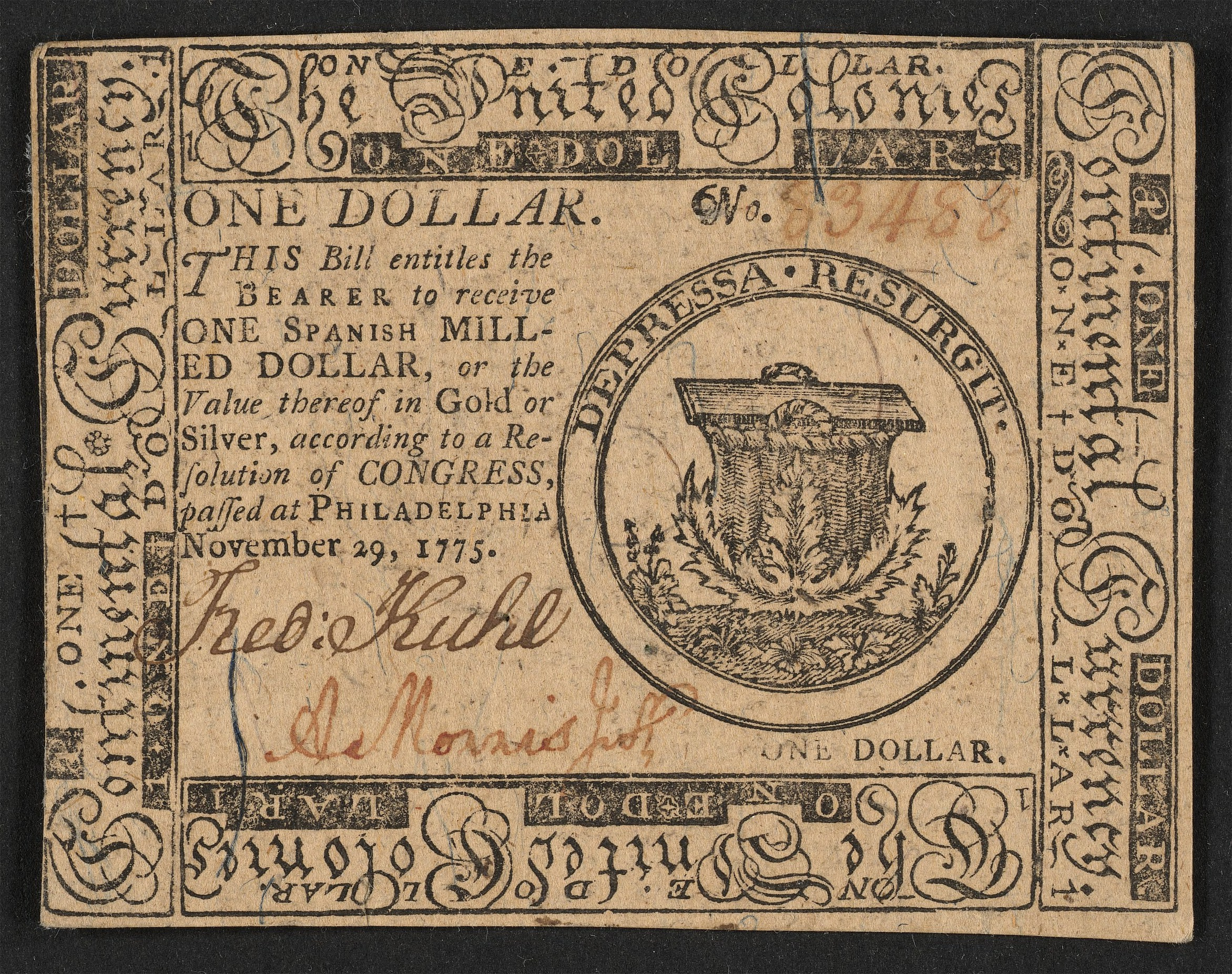
A one-dollar note issued by the Second Continental Congress in 1775

The Second Continental Congress used four main methods to cover the cost of the war, which cost about 66 million dollars in specie (gold and silver). Congress made two issues of paper money, in 1775–1780, and in 1780–81. The first issue amounted to 242 million dollars. This paper money would supposedly be redeemed for state taxes, but the holders were eventually paid off in 1791 at the rate of one cent on the dollar. By 1780, the paper money was "not worth a Continental", as people said, and a second issue of new currency was attempted. The second issue quickly became nearly worthless—but it was redeemed by the new federal government in 1791 at 100 cents on the dollar. At the same time the states, especially Virginia and the Carolinas, issued over 200 million dollars of their own currency. In effect, the paper money was a hidden tax on the people, and indeed was the only method of taxation that was possible at the time. The skyrocketing inflation was a hardship on the few people who had fixed incomes—but 90 percent of the people were farmers, and were not directly affected by that inflation. Debtors benefited by paying off their debts with depreciated paper. The greatest burden was borne by the soldiers of the Continental Army, whose wages—usually in arrears—declined in value every month, weakening their morale and adding to the hardships suffered by their families.

Starting in 1776, the Congress sought to raise money by loans from wealthy individuals, promising to redeem the bonds after the war. The bonds were in fact redeemed in 1791 at face value, but the scheme raised little money because Americans had little specie, and many of the rich merchants were supporters of the Crown. Starting in 1776, the French secretly supplied the Americans with money, gunpowder and munitions in order to weaken its arch enemy, Great Britain. When the Kingdom of France officially entered the war in 1778, the subsidies continued, and the French government, as well as bankers in Paris and Amsterdam loaned large sums to the American war effort. These loans were repaid in full in the 1790s.

Beginning in 1777, Congress repeatedly asked the states to provide money. But the states had no system of taxation either, and were little help. By 1780 Congress was making requisitions for specific supplies of corn, beef, pork and other necessities—an inefficient system that kept the army barely alive.

The cities played a major role in fomenting the American Revolution, but they were hard hit during the war itself, 1775–83. They lost their main role as oceanic ports, because of the blockade by the Royal Navy. Furthermore, the British occupied the cities, especially New York 1776–83, and the others for briefer periods. During the occupations they were cut off from their hinterland trade and from overland communication. When the British finally departed in 1783, they took out large numbers of wealthy merchants who resumed their business activities elsewhere in the British Empire.

=== Confederation: 1781–1789 ===
A brief economic recession followed the war, but prosperity returned by 1786. About 60,000 to 80,000 American Loyalists left the U.S. for elsewhere in the British Empire, especially Canada. They took their slaves but left lands and properties behind. Some returned in the mid-1780s, especially to more welcoming states like New York and South Carolina. Economically mid-Atlantic states recovered particularly quickly and began manufacturing and processing goods, while New England and the South experienced more uneven recoveries. Trade with Britain resumed, and the volume of British imports after the war matched the volume from before the war, but exports fell precipitously.

John Adams, serving as the minister to Britain, called for a retaliatory tariff in order to force the British to negotiate a commercial treaty, particularly regarding access to Caribbean markets. However, Congress lacked the power to regulate foreign commerce or compel the states to follow a unified trade policy, and Britain proved unwilling to negotiate. While trade with the British did not fully recover, the U.S. expanded trade with France, the Netherlands, Portugal, and other European countries. Despite these good economic conditions, traders complained of the high duties imposed by each state, which served to restrain interstate trade. A number of creditors also suffered from the failure of domestic governments to repay debts incurred during the war. Though the 1780s saw moderate economic growth, many experienced economic anxiety, and Congress received much of the blame for failing to foster a stronger economy. On the positive side, the states gave Congress control of the western lands and an effective system for population expansion was developed. The Northwest Ordinance of 1787 abolished slavery in the area north of the Ohio River and promised statehood when a territory reached a threshold population, as Ohio did in 1803.

== New nation ==
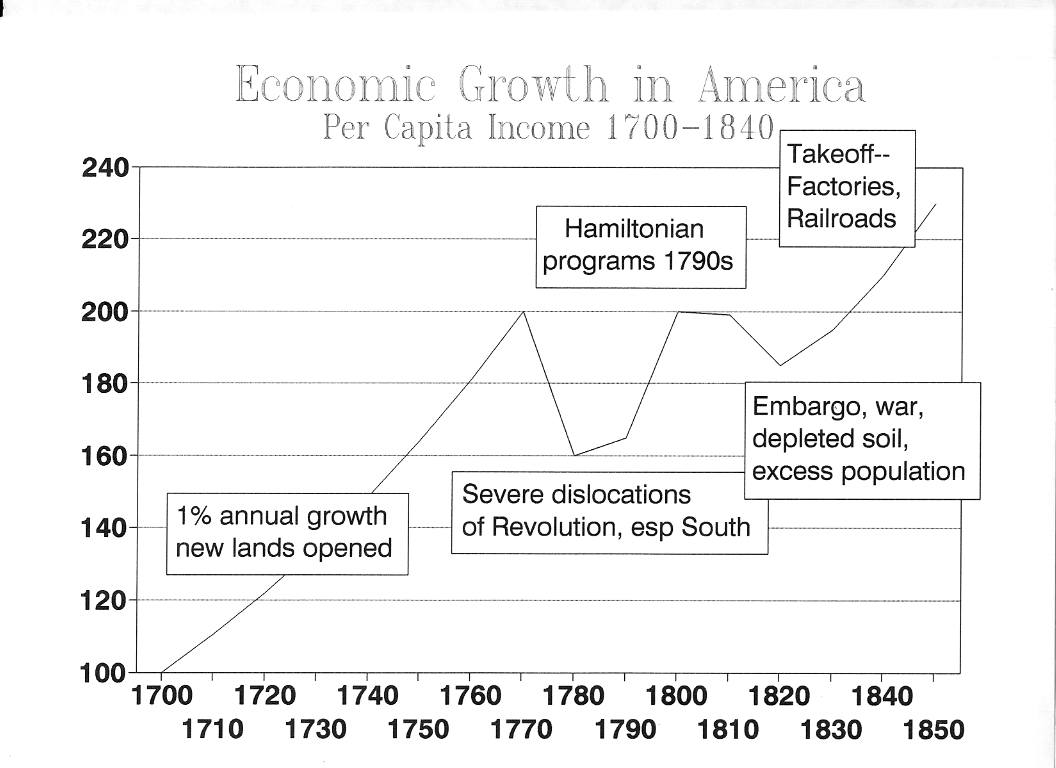
Chart 1: trends in economic growth, 1700–1850

The Constitution of the United States, adopted in 1787, established that the entire nation was a unified, or common market, with no internal tariffs or taxes on interstate commerce. The extent of federal power was much debated, with Alexander Hamilton taking a broad view as the first Secretary of the Treasury during the presidential administration of George Washington. Hamilton successfully argued for the concept of "implied powers", whereby the federal government was authorized by the Constitution to create anything necessary to support its contents, even if it not specifically noted in it (build lighthouses, etc.). He succeeded in building strong national credit based on taking over the state debts and bundling them with the old national debt into new securities sold to the wealthy. They in turn now had an interest in keeping the new government solvent. Hamilton funded the debt with tariffs on imported goods and a highly controversial tax on whiskey. Hamilton believed the United States should pursue economic growth through diversified shipping, manufacturing, and banking, as outlined in his Report on Manufactures. He sought and achieved Congressional authority to create the First Bank of the United States in 1791; the charter lasted until 1811.

After the war, the older cities finally restored their economic basis; newer growing cities included Salem, Massachusetts (which opened a new trade with China), New London, Connecticut, and Baltimore, Maryland. Secretary Hamilton set up a national bank in 1791. New local banks began to flourish in all the cities. Merchant entrepreneurship flourished and was a powerful engine of prosperity in the cities.

World peace lasted only a decade, for in 1793 two decades of war between Britain and France and their allies broke out. As the leading neutral trading partner the United States did business with both sides. France resented it, and the Quasi-War of 1798–99 disrupted trade. Outraged at British impositions on American merchant ships, and sailors, the Jefferson and Madison administrations engaged in economic warfare with Britain 1807–1812, and then full-scale warfare 1812 to 1815. The war cut off imports and encouraged the rise of American manufacturing.

=== Industry and commerce ===
==== Transportation ====
There were very few roads outside of cities and no canals in the new nation. In 1792 it was reported that the cost of transport of a number of crops to seaport was from one-fifth to one half their cost. The cheapest form of transportation was by water, along the seacoast or on lakes and rivers. In 1816 it was reported that "A ton of goods could be brought 3000 miles from Europe for about $9, but for that same sum it could be moved only 30 miles in this country".

==== Automatic flour mill ====
In the mid-1780s Oliver Evans invented a fully automatic mill that could process grain with practically no human labor or operator attention. This was a revolutionary development in two ways: 1) it used bucket elevators and conveyor belts, which would eventually revolutionize materials handling, and 2) it used governors, a forerunner of modern automation, for control.

==== Cotton gin ====
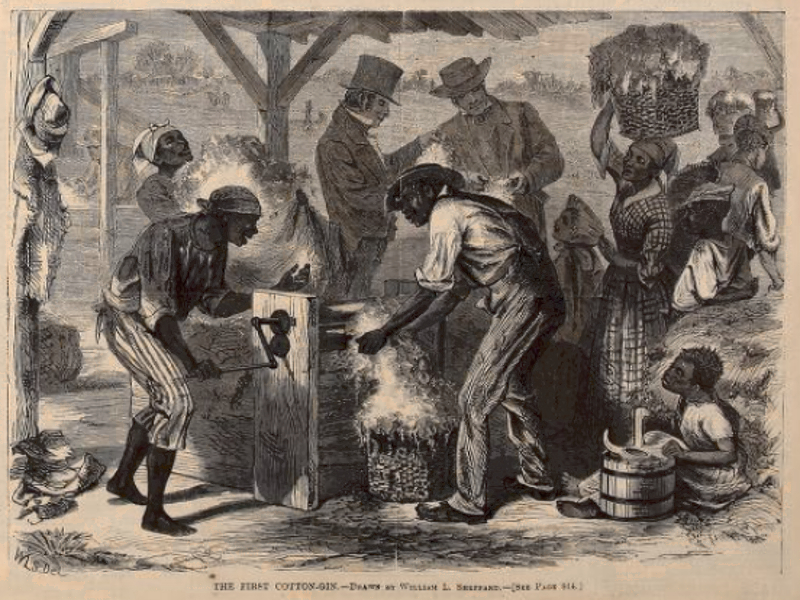
"The First Cotton Gin" conjectural image from 1869

Cotton was at first a small-scale crop in the South. Cotton farming boomed following the improvement of the cotton gin by Eli Whitney. It was 50 times more productive at removing the seeds than with a roller. Soon, large cotton plantations, based on slave labor, expanded in the richest lands from the Carolinas westward to Texas. The raw cotton was shipped to textile mills in Britain, France and New England.

==== Mechanized textile manufacturing ====
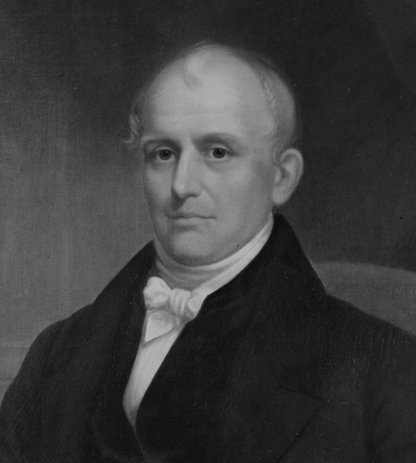
Samuel Slater (1768–1835)

In the final decade of the 18th century, England was beginning to enter the rapid growth period of the Industrial Revolution, but the rest of the world was completely devoid of any type of large scale mechanized industry. Britain prohibited the export of textile machinery and designs and did not allow mechanics with such skills to emigrate. Samuel Slater, who worked as mechanic at a cotton spinning operation in England, memorized the design of the machinery. He was able to disguise himself as a laborer and emigrated to the U.S., where he heard there was a demand for his knowledge.

In 1789 Slater began working as a consultant to Almy & Brown in Rhode Island who were trying to spin cotton on equipment they had recently purchased. Slater determined that the machinery was not capable of producing good quality yarn and persuaded the owners to have him design new machinery. In 1793 Slater and Brown opened a factory in Pawtucket, Rhode Island, which was the first successful water powered roller spinning cotton factory in the U.S. ( See: Slater Mill Historic Site ). David Wilkinson went on to invent a metalworking lathe which won him a Congressional prize.

=== Finance, money and banking ===
The U.S. Constitution (Article 1, Section 8, Clause 5) gave the government the power to coin money to establish a mint. The dollar was established as the monetary unit of the U.S. by the Coinage Act of 1792, which also defined its value in terms of gold and silver.

The First Bank of the United States was chartered in 1791. It was designed by Alexander Hamilton and faced strenuous opposition from agrarians led by Thomas Jefferson, who deeply distrusted banks and urban institutions. They closed the Bank in 1811, just when the War of 1812 made it more important than ever for Treasury needs.

== Early 19th century ==
The United States economy was mostly agricultural with a growing industry throughout the first third of the 19th century. Most people lived on farms and produced much of what they consumed. A considerable percentage of the non-farm population was engaged in handling goods for export. The country was an exporter of agricultural products. The U.S. built the best ships in the world.

The textile industry became established in New England, where there was abundant water power. Steam power began being used in factories, but water was the dominant source of industrial power until the Civil War.

The building of roads and canals, the introduction of steamboats and the first railroads were the beginning of a transportation revolution that would accelerate throughout the century.

=== Political developments ===
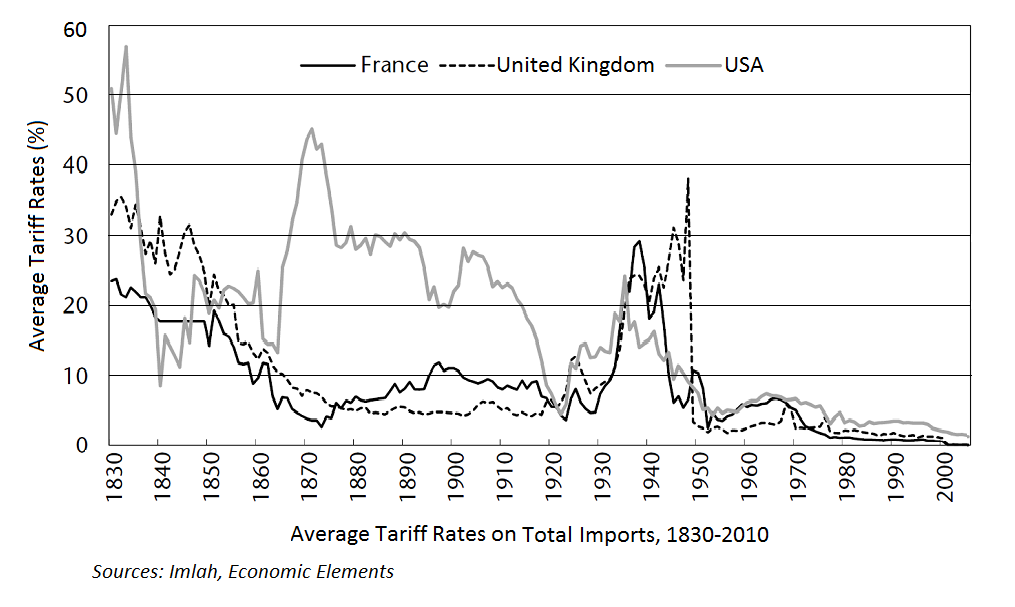
Tariff Rates (France, UK, US)

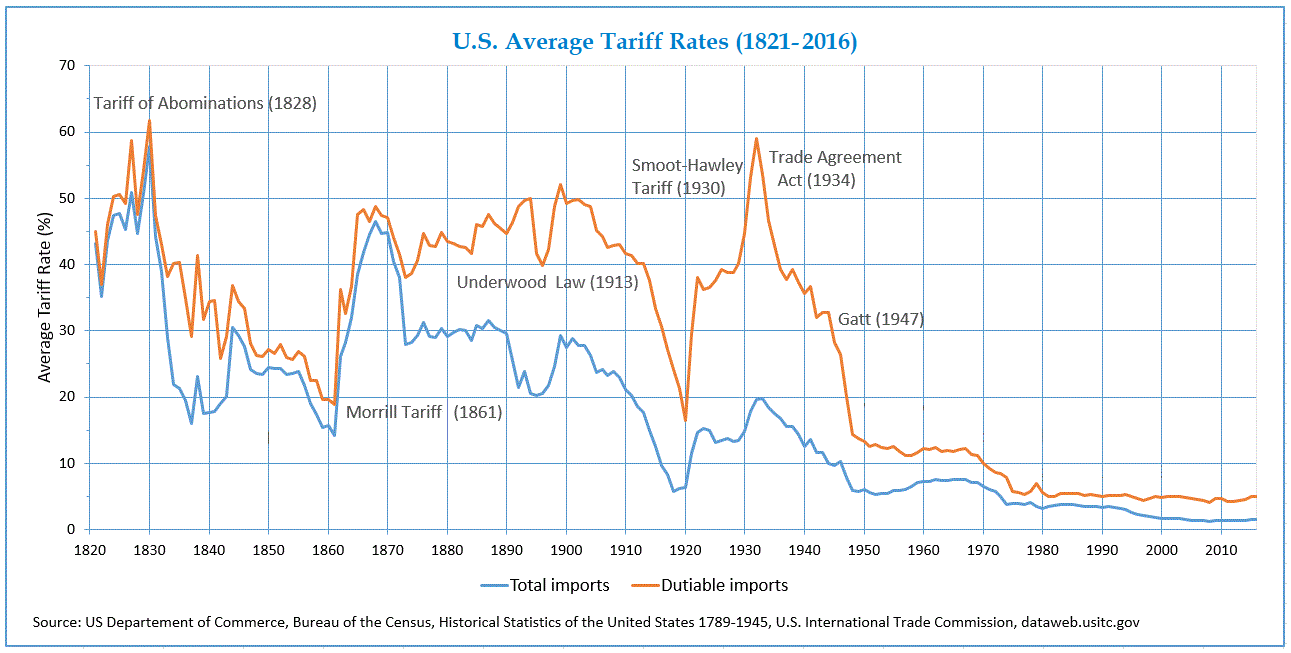
Average Tariff Rates in USA (1821–2016)

The institutional arrangements of the American System were initially formulated by Alexander Hamilton, who proposed the creation of a government-sponsored bank and increased tariffs to encourage industrial development. Following Hamilton's death, the American school of political economy was championed in the antebellum period by Henry Clay and the Whig Party generally.

Specific government programs and policies which gave shape and form to the American School and the American System include the establishment of the Patent Office in 1802; the creation of the Coast and Geodetic Survey in 1807 and other measures to improve river and harbor navigation; the various Army expeditions to the west, beginning with the Lewis and Clark Expedition in 1804 and continuing into the 1870s, almost always under the direction of an officer from the United States Army Corps of Topographical Engineers, and which provided crucial information for the overland pioneers that followed; the assignment of Army Engineer officers to assist or direct the surveying and construction of the early railroads and canals; the establishment of the First Bank of the United States and Second Bank of the United States as well as various protectionist measures such as the tariffs of 1816 and 1828).

Thomas Jefferson and James Madison opposed a strong central government and, consequently, most of Hamilton's economic policies, but they could not stop Hamilton, who wielded immense power and political clout in the Washington administration. In 1801, however, Jefferson became president and turned to promoting a more decentralized, agrarian democracy called Jeffersonian democracy. He based his philosophy on protecting the common man from political and economic tyranny. He particularly praised small farmers as "the most valuable citizens". However, Jefferson did not change Hamilton's basic policies. As president in 1811 Madison let the bank charter expire, but the War of 1812 proved the need for a national bank and Madison reversed positions. The Second Bank of the United States was established in 1816, with a 20-year charter.

Thomas Jefferson was able to purchase the Louisiana Territory from Napoleon in 1803 for $15 million, with money raised in England. The Louisiana Purchase greatly expanded the size of the United States, adding extremely good farmland, the Mississippi River and the city of New Orleans. The French Revolutionary and Napoleonic Wars from 1793 to 1814 caused withdrawal of most foreign shipping from the U.S., leaving trade in the Caribbean and Latin America at risk for the seizure of American merchant ships by France and Britain. This led to Jefferson's Embargo Act of 1807 which prohibited most foreign trade. The War of 1812, by cutting off almost all foreign trade, created a home market for goods made in the U.S. (even if they were more expensive), changing an early tendency toward free trade into a protectionism characterized by nationalism and protective tariffs.

States built roads and waterways, such as the Cumberland Pike (1818) and the Erie Canal (1825), opening up markets for western farm products. The Whig Party supported Clay's American System, which proposed to build internal improvements (e.g. roads, canals and harbors), protect industry, and create a strong national bank. The Whig legislation program was blocked at the national level by the Jacksonian Democrats, but similar modernization programs were enacted in most states on a bipartisan basis.

The role of the Federal Government in regulating interstate commerce was firmly established by the landmark Supreme Court ruling in Gibbons v Ogden, which decided against allowing states to grant exclusive rights to steamboat companies operating between states.

President Andrew Jackson (1829–1837), leader of the new Democratic Party, opposed the Second Bank of the United States, which he believed favored the entrenched interests of the rich. When he was elected for a second term, Jackson blocked the renewal of the bank's charter. Jackson opposed paper money and demanded the government be paid in gold and silver coins. The Panic of 1837 stopped business growth for three years.

=== Agriculture, commerce and industry ===
==== Population growth ====
Although there was relatively little immigration from Europe, the rapid expansion of settlements to the West, and the Louisiana Purchase of 1803, opened up vast frontier lands. The high birth rate, and the availability of cheap land caused the rapid expansion of population. The average age was under 20, with children everywhere. The population grew from 5.3 million people in 1800, living on 865,000 square miles of land to 9.6 million in 1820 on 1,749,000 square miles. By 1840, the population had reached 17,069,000 on the same land.

New Orleans and St. Louis joined the United States and grew rapidly; entirely new cities were begun at Pittsburgh, Marietta, Cincinnati, Louisville, Lexington, Nashville and points west. The coming of the steamboat after 1810 made upstream traffic economical on major rivers, especially the Hudson, Ohio, Mississippi, Illinois, Missouri, Tennessee, and Cumberland rivers. Historian Richard Wade has emphasized the importance of the new cities in the Westward expansion in settlement of the farmlands. They were the transportation centers, and nodes for migration and financing of the westward expansion. The newly opened regions had few roads, but a good river system in which everything flowed downstream to New Orleans. With the coming of the steamboat after 1815, it became possible to move merchandise imported from the Northeast and from Europe upstream to new settlements. The opening of the Erie Canal made Buffalo the jumping off point for the lake transportation system that made major trading centers in Cleveland, Detroit, and especially Chicago.

==== Labor shortage ====
The U.S. economy of the early 19th century was characterized by labor shortages. It was attributed to the cheapness of land and the high returns on agriculture. All types of labor were in high demand, especially unskilled labor and experienced factory workers. Wages in the U.S. were typically between 30 and 50 percent higher than in Britain. Women factory workers were especially scarce. The elasticity of labor was low due in part to a lack of transportation and low population density. The relative labor scarcity and high price was an incentive for capital investment, particularly in machinery.

==== Agriculture ====
The U.S. economy was primarily agricultural in the early 19th century. Westward expansion plus the building of canals and the introduction of steamboats opened up new areas for agriculture. Much land was cleared and put into growing cotton in the Mississippi valley and in Alabama, and new grain growing areas were brought into production in the Midwest. Eventually this put severe downward pressure on prices, particularly of cotton, first from 1820 to 1823 and again from 1840 to 1843.

Before the Industrial Revolution most cotton was spun and woven near where it was grown, leaving little raw cotton for the international marketplace. World cotton demand experienced strong growth due to mechanized spinning and weaving technologies of the Industrial Revolution. Although cotton was grown in India, China, Egypt, the Middle East and other tropical and subtropical areas, the Americas, particularly the U.S., had sufficient suitable land available to support large scale cotton plantations, which were highly profitable. A strain of cotton seed brought from New Spain to Natchez, Mississippi, in 1806 would become the parent genetic material for over 90% of world cotton production today; it produced bolls that were three to four times faster to pick. The cotton trade, excluding financing, transport and marketing, was 6 percent or less of national income in the 1830s. Cotton became the United States' largest export.

Sugarcane was being grown in Louisiana, where it was refined into granular sugar. Growing and refining sugar required a large amount of capital. Some of the nation's wealthiest people owned sugar plantations, which often had their own sugar mills.

Southern plantations, which grew cotton, sugarcane and tobacco, used African slave labor. Per capita food production did not keep pace with the rapidly expanding urban population and industrial labor force in the Antebellum decades.

==== Roads ====
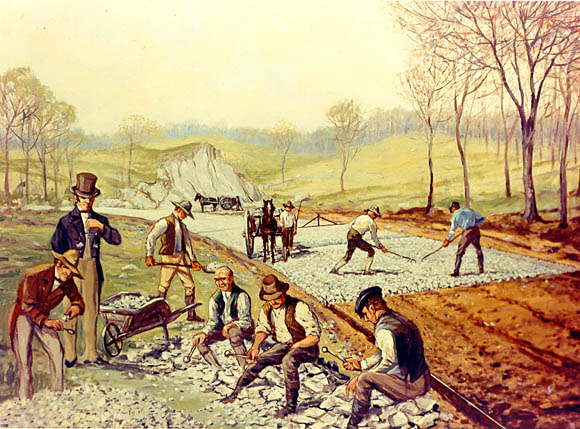
Construction of the first macadamized road in the United States (1823). In the foreground, workers are breaking stones "so as not to exceed 6 ounces [170 g] in weight or to pass a two-inch [5 cm] ring".

There were only a few roads outside of cities at the beginning of the 19th century, but turnpikes were being built. A ton-mile by wagon cost from between 30 and 70 cents in 1819. Robert Fulton's estimate for typical wagonage was 32 cents per ton-mile. The cost of transporting wheat or corn to Philadelphia exceeded the value at 218 and 135 miles, respectively. To facilitate westward expansion, in 1801 Thomas Jefferson began work on the Natchez Trace, which was to connect Daniel Boone's Wilderness Road, which ended in Nashville, Tennessee, with the Mississippi River.

Following the Louisiana Purchase the need for additional roads to the West were recognized by Thomas Jefferson, who authorized the construction of the Cumberland Road in 1806. The Cumberland Road was to connect Cumberland Maryland on the Potomac River with the Wheeling (West) Virginia on the Ohio River, which was on the other side of the Allegheny Mountains. Mail roads were also built to New Orleans.

The building of roads in the early years of the 19th century greatly lowered transportation costs and was a factor in the deflation of 1819 to 1821, which was one of the most severe in U.S. history.

Some turnpikes were wooden plank roads, which typically cost about $1,500 to $1,800 per mile, but wore out quickly. Macadam roads in New York cost an average of $3,500 per mile, while high-quality roads cost between $5,000 and $10,000 per mile.

==== Canals ====
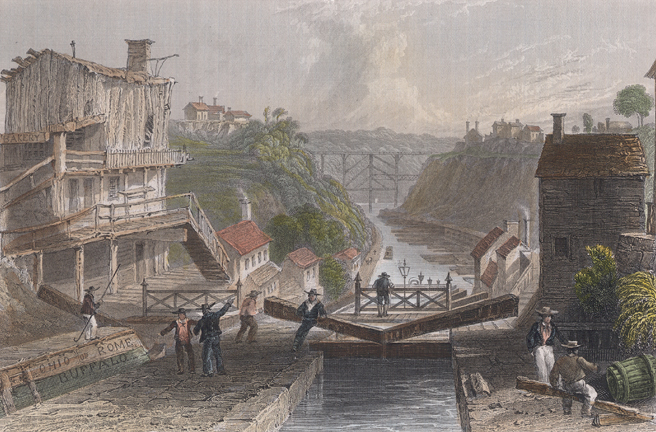
Scene of Lockport on the Erie Canal (W. H. Bartlett 1839)

Because a horse can pull a barge carrying a cargo of over 50 tons compared to the typical one ton or less hauled by wagon, and the horse required a wagoner versus a couple of men for the barge, water transportation costs were a small fraction of wagonage costs. Canals' shipping costs were between two and three cents per ton-mile, compared to 17–20 cents by wagon. The cost of constructing a typical canal was between $20,000 and $30,000 per mile.

Only 100 miles of canals had been built in the U.S. by 1816, and only a few were longer than two miles. The early canals were typically financially successful, such as those carrying coal in the Coal Region of Northeastern Pennsylvania, where canal construction was concentrated until 1820.

The 325-mile Erie Canal, which connected Albany, New York, on the Hudson River with Buffalo, New York, on Lake Erie, began operation in 1825. Wagon cost from Buffalo to New York City in 1817 was 19.2 cents per ton-mile. By Erie Canal c. 1857 to 1860 the cost was 0.81 cents. The Erie Canal was a great commercial success and had a large regional economic impact.

The Delaware and Raritan Canal was also successful. Also important was the 2.5-mile canal bypassing the falls of the Ohio River at Louisville, which opened in 1830.

The success of some of the early canals led to a canal building boom, during which work began on multiple canals which would prove to be financially unsuccessful. As the canal boom was underway in the late 1820s, a small number of horse railways were being built. These were quickly followed by the first steam railways in the 1830s.

==== Steam power ====
In 1780 the United States had three major steam engines, all of which were used for pumping water: two in mines and one for New York City's water supply. Most power in the U.S. was supplied by water wheels and water turbines after their introduction in 1840. By 1807, when the North River Steamboat (unofficially called Clermont) first sailed, there were estimated to be fewer than a dozen steam engines operating in the U.S. Steam power did not overtake water power until sometime after 1850.

Oliver Evans began developing a high pressure steam engine that was more practical than the engine developed around the same time by Richard Trevithick in England. The high pressure engine did away with the separate condenser and thus did not require cooling water. It also had a higher power to weight ratio, making it suitable for powering steamboats and locomotives.

Evans produced a few custom steam engines from 1801 to 1806, when he opened the Mars Works iron foundry and factory in Philadelphia, where he produced additional engines. In 1812, he produced a successful Colombian engine at Mars Works. As his business grew and orders were being shipped, Evans and a partner formed the Pittsburgh Steam Engine Company in Pittsburgh, Pennsylvania. Steam engines soon became common in public water supply, sawmills and flour milling, especially in areas with little or no water power.

==== Mechanical power transmission ====
In 1828, Paul Moody substituted leather belting for gearing in mills. Leather belting from line shafts was the common way to distribute power from steam engines and water turbines in mills and factories. In the factory boom of the late 19th century it was common for large factories to have many miles of line shafts. Leather belting continued in use until it was displaced by unit drive electric motors in the early decades of the 20th century.

==== Shipbuilding ====
Shipbuilding remained a sizable industry. U.S.-built ships were superior in design, required smaller crews and cost between 40 and 60 percent less to build than European ships. The British gained the lead in shipbuilding after they introduced iron-hulled ships in the mid-19th century.

==== Steamboats and steam ships ====
Commercial steamboat operations began in 1807 within weeks of the launch of Robert Fulton's North River Steamboat, often referred to as the Clermont.

The first steamboats were powered by Boulton and Watt type low pressure engines, which were large and heavy in relation to the smaller high pressure engines. In 1807, Robert L. Stevens began operation of the Phoenix, which used a high pressure engine in combination with a low pressure condensing engine. The first steamboats powered only by high pressure were the Aetna and Pennsylvania designed and built by Oliver Evans.

In the winter of 1811 to 1812, the New Orleans became the first steamboat to travel down the Ohio and Mississippi Rivers from Pittsburgh to New Orleans. The commercial feasibility of steamboats on the Mississippi and its tributaries was demonstrated by the Enterprise in 1814.

By the time of Fulton's death in 1815, he operated 21 of the estimated 30 steamboats in the U.S. The number of steamboats steadily grew into the hundreds. There were more steamboats in the Mississippi valley than anywhere else in the world.

Early steamboats took 30 days to travel from New Orleans to Louisville, which was from half to one-quarter the time by keel boat. Due to improvements in steamboat technology, by 1830 the time from New Orleans to Louisville was halved. In 1820, freight rates for keel boats were five cents per ton-mile versus two cents by steamboat, falling to one-half cent per ton-mile by 1830.

The SS Savannah crossed from Savannah to Liverpool in 1819 as the first trans-Atlantic steamship; however, until the development of more efficient engines, trans-ocean ships had to carry more coal than freight. Early trans-ocean steamships were used for passengers and soon some companies began offering regularly scheduled service.

==== Railroads ====
Railroads were an English invention, and the first entrepreneurs imported British equipment in the 1830s. By the 1850s, the Americans had developed their own technology. The early lines in the 1830s and 1840s were locally funded and connected nearby cities or connected farms to navigable waterways. They primarily handled freight rather than passengers. The first locomotives were imported from England. One such locomotive was the John Bull which arrived in 1831. While awaiting assembly, Matthias W. Baldwin, who had designed and manufactured a highly successful stationary steam engine, was able to inspect the parts and obtain measurements. Baldwin was already working on an experimental locomotive based on designs shown at the Rainhill Trials in England. Baldwin produced his first locomotive in 1832; he went on to found the Baldwin Locomotive Works, one of the largest locomotive manufacturers. In 1833, when there were few locomotives in the U.S., three quarters of locomotives were made in England. In 1838, there were 346 locomotives, three-fourths of which were made in the U.S.

Ohio had more railroads built in the 1840s than any other state. Ohio's railroads put the canals out of business. A typical mile of railroad cost $30,000 compared to the $20,000 per mile of canal, but a railroad could carry 50 times as much traffic. Railroads appeared at the time of the canal boom, causing its abrupt end, although some canals flourished for an additional half-century.

==== Manufacturing ====
Starting with textiles in the 1790s, factories were built to supply a regional and national market. The power came from waterfalls, and most of the factories were built alongside the rivers in rural New England and Upstate New York.

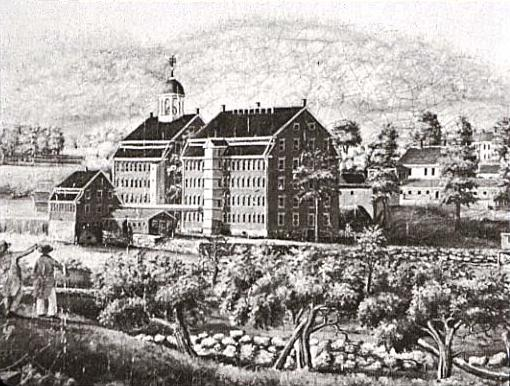
Boston Manufacturing Co., Waltham, Massachusetts

Before 1800, most cloth was made in home workshops, and housewives sewed it into clothing for family use or trade with neighbors. In 1810, the secretary of the treasury estimated that two-thirds of rural household clothing, including hosiery and linen, was produced by households. By the 1820s, housewives bought the cloth at local stores and continued their sewing chores. The American textile industry was established during the long period of wars from 1793 to 1815, when cheap cloth imports from Britain were unavailable. Samuel Slater secretly brought in the plans for complex textile machinery from Britain, and he built new factories in Rhode Island using the stolen designs. By the time the Embargo Act of 1807 cut off trade with Britain, there were 15 cotton spinning mills in operation. These cotton spinning mills were all small operations, typically employing fewer than 50 people, and most used Arkwright water frames powered by small streams; all of these mills were located in southeastern New England.

In 1809, the number of mills had grown to 62, with 25 under construction. To meet increased demand for cloth, several manufacturers resorted to the putting-out system of having the handloom weaving done in homes. The putting-out system was inefficient because of the difficulty of distributing the yarn and collecting the cloth, embezzlement of supplies, lack of supervision and poor quality. To overcome these problems the textile manufacturers began to consolidate work in central workshops locations where they could supervise operations. Taking this to the next level, in 1813 Francis Cabot Lowell of the Boston Manufacturing Company built the first integrated spinning and weaving factory in the world at Waltham, Massachusetts. Using plans for a power loom that he smuggled out of England, this factory was the largest in the U.S., with a workforce of about 300. It was an efficient, profitable mill that, with the aid of the Tariff of 1816, competed effectively with British textiles at a time when smaller operations were being forced out of business.

The Fall River Manufactory, located on the Quequechan River in Fall River, Massachusetts, was founded in 1813 by Dexter Wheeler and cousin David Anthony. By 1827, there were 10 cotton mills in the Fall River area, which soon became the country's leading producer of printed cotton cloth.

Beginning with Lowell, Massachusetts, in the 1820s, large-scale factory towns, mostly mill towns, began growing around rapidly expanding manufacturing plants, especially in New England, New York, and New Jersey. Some were established as company towns, where either from idealism or economic exploitation, the same corporation that owned the factory also owned all local worker housing and retail establishments. This paternalistic model experienced significant pushback with the Pullman Strike of 1894, and significantly declined with increasing worker affluence during the Roaring Twenties, development of the automobile that allowed workers to live outside of the factory town, and New Deal policies.

The U.S. began exporting textiles in the 1830s; the Americans specialized in coarse fabrics, while the British exported finer cloth that reached a somewhat different market. Cloth production—mostly cotton but also wool, linen and silk—became the leading American industry. The building of textile machinery became a major driving force in the development of advanced mechanical devices.

The shoe industry began transitioning from production by craftsmen to the factory system, with division of labor.

Low return freight rates from Europe offered little protection from imports to domestic industries.

===== Environmental impact of textile factories =====
Cash wages brought rural workers into the new textile mills where they faced significant health challenges due to air and noise pollution. The men, women and children worked in family teams 10 hours a day in a tightly enclosed environment filled with dust and fiber. Large numbers of people laboring in close quarters was the ideal setting for the rapid spread of a number of diseases including the common cold, bronchitis, pneumonia and tuberculosis. The also suffered hearing loss and fatigue. Byssinosis, also known as "brown lung disease" or "Monday fever", was particularly prevalent among cotton textile workers, with symptoms including chest tightness and shortness of breath. There were sharp disagreements among workers, employers, and medical professionals regarding the impact of factory environments on health.< The mills seldom employed medical care on site but they did support community hospitals.

===== Development of interchangeable parts =====
Standardization and interchangeability have been cited as major contributors to the exceptional growth of the U.S. economy.

The idea of standardization of armaments originated from the French Gribeauval system in 1765. Honoré Blanc began producing muskets with interchangeable locks in France when Thomas Jefferson was minister to France. Jefferson wrote a letter to John Jay about these developments in 1785. The idea of armament standardization was advocated by Louis de Tousard, who fled the French Revolution and in 1795 joined the U.S. Corps of Artillerists and Engineers where he taught artillery and engineering. At the suggestion of George Washington, Tousard wrote The American Artillerist's Companion (1809). This manual became a standard textbook for officer training; it stressed the importance of a system of standardized armaments.

Fears of war stemming from the XYZ Affair caused the U.S. to begin offering cash advance contracts for producing small arms to private individuals in 1798. Two notable recipients of these contracts associated with interchangeable parts were Eli Whitney and Simeon North. Although Whitney was not able to make interchangeable parts, he was a proponent of using machinery for gun making; however, he employed only the simplest machines in his factory. North eventually made progress toward some degree of interchangeability and developed special machinery. North's shop used the first known milling machine (c. 1816), a fundamental machine tool.

The experience of the War of 1812 led the War Department to issue a request for contract proposals for firearms with interchangeable parts. Previously, parts from each firearm had to be carefully custom fitted; almost all infantry regiments necessarily included an artificer or armorer who could perform this intricate gunsmithing. The requirement for interchangeable parts forced the development of modern metal-working machine tools, including milling machines, grinders, shapers and planers. The Federal Armories perfected the use of machine tools by developing fixtures to correctly position the parts being machined and jigs to guide the cutting tools over the proper path. Systems of measuring blocks and gauges were also developed to check the accuracy and precision of the machined parts. Developing the manufacturing techniques for making interchangeable parts by the Federal Armories took over two decades; however, the first interchangeable small arms parts were not made to a high degree of precision. It wasn't until the mid-century or later that parts for U.S. rifles could be considered truly interchangeable with a degree of precision. In 1853, when the British Parliamentary Committee on Small Arms questioned gun maker Samuel Colt, and machine tool makers James Nasmyth and Joseph Whitworth, there was still some question about what constituted interchangeability and whether it could be achieved at a reasonable cost.

The machinists' skills were called armory practice and the system eventually became known as the American system of manufacturing. Machinists from the armories eventually spread the technology to other industries, such as clocks and watches, especially in the New England area. It wasn't until late in the 19th century that interchangeable parts became widespread in U.S. manufacturing. Among the items using interchangeable parts were some sewing machine brands and bicycles.

The development of these modern machine tools and machining practices made possible the development of modern industry capable of mass production; however, large scale industrial production did not develop in the U.S. until the late 19th century.

=== Finance, money and banking ===
The charter for the First Bank of the United States expired in 1811. Its absence caused serious difficulties for the national government trying to finance the War of 1812 over the refusal of New England bankers to help out.

President James Madison reversed earlier Jeffersonian opposition to banking and secured the opening of a new national bank. The Second Bank of the United States was chartered in 1816. Its leading executive was Philadelphia banker Nicholas Biddle. It collapsed in 1836 under heavy attack from President Andrew Jackson during his Bank War.

There were three economic downturns in the early 19th century. The first was the result of the Embargo Act of 1807, which shut off most international shipping and trade due to the Napoleonic Wars. The embargo caused a depression in cities and industries dependent on European trade. The other two downturns were depressions accompanied by significant periods of deflation during the early 19th century. The first and most severe was during the depression from 1818 to 1821 when prices of agricultural commodities declined by almost 50 percent. A credit contraction caused by a financial crisis in England drained specie out of the U.S. The Bank of the United States also contracted its lending. The price of agricultural commodities fell by almost 50 percent from the high in 1815 to the low in 1821. These commodities' prices did not recover until the late 1830s, although to a significantly lower price level. Most damaging was the price of cotton: the U.S.'s main export. Food crop prices, which had been high because of the famine of 1816 that was caused by the year without a summer, fell after the return of normal harvests in 1818. Improved transportation, mainly from turnpikes, significantly lowered transportation costs.

The third economic downturn was the depression of the late 1830s to 1843, following the Panic of 1837, when the money supply in the United States contracted by about 34 percent with prices falling by 33 percent. The magnitude of this contraction is matched only by the Great Depression. A fundamental cause of the Panic of 1837 was depletion of Mexican silver mines. Despite the deflation and depression, GDP rose 16 percent from 1839 to 1843, partly because of rapid population growth.

In order to dampen speculation in land, Andrew Jackson signed the executive order known as the Specie Circular in 1836, requiring sale of government land to be paid in gold and silver. Branch mints at New Orleans; Dahlonega, Georgia; and Charlotte, North Carolina, were authorized by congress in 1835 and became operational in 1838.

Gold had been withdrawn from the U.S. by England and silver had also been taken out of the country because it had been undervalued relative to gold by the Coinage Act of 1834. Canal projects began to fail. The result was the financial Panic of 1837. In 1838, there was a brief recovery. The business cycle upturn occurred in 1843.

Economic historians have explored the high degree of financial and economic instability in the Jacksonian era. For the most part, they follow the conclusions of Peter Temin, who absolved Jackson's policies, and blamed international events beyond American control, such as conditions in Mexico, China, and Britain. A survey of economic historians in 1995 show that the vast majority concur with Temin's conclusion that "the inflation and financial crisis of the 1830s had their origin in events largely beyond President Jackson's control and would have taken place whether or not he had acted as he did vis-a-vis the Second Bank of the U.S."

==== Economics of the War of 1812 ====
The War of 1812 was financed by borrowing, by new issues of private bank notes and by an inflation in prices of 15%. The government was a poor manager during the war, with delays in payments and confusion, as the Treasury took in money months after it was scheduled to pay it out. Inexperience, indecision, incompetence, partisanship and confusion were the main hallmarks. The federal government's management system was designed to minimize the federal role before 1812. The Democratic-Republican Party in power deliberately wanted to downsize the power and roles of the federal government; when the war began, the Federalist opposition worked hard to sabotage operations. Problems multiplied rapidly in 1812, and all the weaknesses were magnified, especially regarding the Army and the Treasury. There were no serious reforms before the war ended. In financial matters, the decentralizing ideology of the Democratic-Republicans meant they wanted the First Bank of the United States to expire in 1811, when its 20-year charter ran out. The bank's absence made the financing of the war much more difficult to handle, and it caused special problems in terms of moving money from state to state, since state banks were not allowed to operate across state lines. The bureaucracy was terrible, often missing deadlines. On the positive side, over 120 new state banks were created all over the country, and they issued notes that financed much of the war effort, along with loans raised by Washington. Some key Democratic-Republicans, especially Secretary of the Treasury Albert Gallatin realized the need for new taxes, but the Democratic-Republican Congress was reluctant and only raised small amounts. The whole time, the Federalist Party in Congress and especially the Federalist-controlled state governments in the Northeast, and the Federalist-aligned financial system in the Northeast, were strongly opposed to the war and refused to help in the financing. Indeed, they facilitated smuggling across the Canadian border and sent large amounts of gold and silver to Canada. This smuggling created serious shortages of specie in the US.

Across the two and half years of the war, 1812–1815, the federal government took in more money than it spent. Cash out was $119.5 million, cash in was $154.0 million. Two-thirds of the income was borrowed and had to be paid back in later years; the national debt went from $56.0 million in 1812 to $127.3 million in 1815. Out of the GDP (gross domestic product) of about $925 million (in 1815), this was not a large burden for a national population of 8 million people; it was paid off in 1835. A new Second Bank of the United States was set up in 1816, and after that the financial system performed well despite the fact that there was still a shortage of gold and silver.

U.S. per capita GDP 1810–1815 in constant 2009 dollars

The economy grew every year from 1812 to 1815 despite a large loss of business by East Coast shipping interests. Wartime inflation averaged 4.8% a year. The national economy grew 1812–1815 at the rate of 3.7% a year, after accounting for inflation. Per capita GDP grew at 2.2% a year, after accounting for inflation. Money that would have been spent on imports—mostly cloth—was diverted to opening new factories, which were profitable since British cloth was not available. This gave a major boost to the industrial revolution, as typified by the Boston Associates. The Boston Manufacturing Company built the first integrated spinning and weaving factory in the world at Waltham, Massachusetts, in 1813.

== Middle 19th century ==
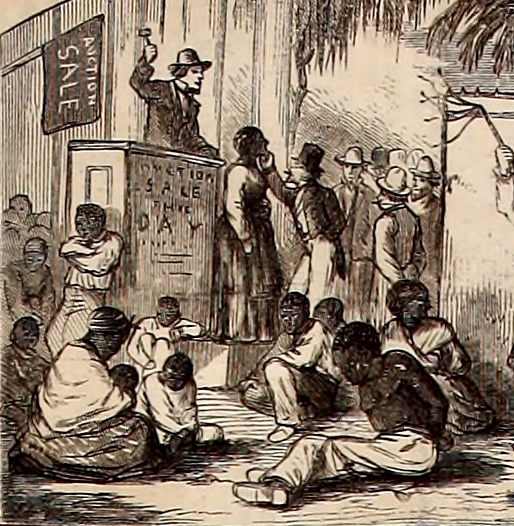
Slave trade in the United States prior to the American Civil War (Detail of Thomas Nast's Andrew Johnson's Reconstruction (1866)

The middle 19th century was a period of transition toward industrialization, particularly in the Northeast, which produced cotton textiles and shoes. The population of the West (generally meaning from Ohio to and including Wisconsin, Minnesota, Iowa and Missouri and south to include Kentucky) grew rapidly. The West was primarily a grain and pork producing region, with an important machine tool industry developing around Cincinnati, Ohio. The Southern economy was based on plantation agriculture, primarily cotton, tobacco and sugar, produced with slave labor.

The market economy and factory system were not typical before 1850, but developed along transportation routes. Steamboats and railroads, introduced in the early part of the century, became widespread and aided westward expansion. The telegraph was introduced in 1844 and was in widespread use by the mid-1850s.

A machine tool industry developed and machinery became a major industry. Sewing machines began being manufactured. The shoe industry became mechanized. Horse drawn reapers became widely introduced, significantly increasing the productivity of farming.

The use of steam engines in manufacturing increased and steam power exceeded water power after the Civil War. Coal replaced wood as the major fuel.

The combination of railroads, the telegraph and machinery and factories began to create an industrial economy.

The longest economic expansion of the United States occurred in the recession-free period between 1841 and 1856. A 2017 study attributes this expansion primarily to "a boom in transportation-goods investment following the discovery of gold in California."

=== Commerce, industry and agriculture ===
The depression that began in 1839 ended with an upswing in economic activity in 1843.

Table 1: Sector shares
	Employment %			Output % (1860 prices)		
Year	Agriculture	Industry	Services	Agriculture	Industry	Services
1840	68	12	20	47	21	31
1850	60	17	23	42	29	29
1860	56	19	25	38	28	34
1870	53	22	25	35	31	34
1880	52	23	25	31	32	38
1890	43	26	31	22	41	37
1900	40	26	33	20	40	39

==== Railroads ====
Railroads opened up remote areas and drastically cut the cost of moving freight and passengers. By 1860 long distance bulk rates had fallen by 95%, less than half of which was due to the general fall in prices. This large fall in transportation costs created "a major revolution in domestic commerce."

As transportation improved, new markets continuously opened. Railroads greatly increased the importance of hub cities such as Atlanta, Billings, Chicago, and Dallas.

Railroads were a highly capital-intensive business, with a typical cost of $30,000 per mile with a considerable range depending on terrain and other factors. Private capital for Railroads during the period from 1830 to 1860 was inadequate. States awarded charters, funding, tax breaks, land grants, and provided some financing. Railroads were allowed banking privileges and lotteries in some states. Private investors provided a small but not insignificant share or railroad capital. A combination of domestic and foreign investment along with the discovery of gold and a major commitment of America's public and private wealth, enabled the nation to develop a large-scale railroad system, establishing the base for the country's industrialization.

Table 2: Railroad Mileage Increase by Groups of States
	1850	1860	1870	1880	1890
New England	2,507	3,660	4,494	5,982	6,831
Middle States	3,202	6,705	10,964	15,872	21,536
Southern States	2,036	8,838	11,192	14,778	29,209
Western States and Territories	1,276	11,400	24,587	52,589	62,394
Pacific States and Territories		23	1,677	4,080	9,804
Total New Track	9,021	30,626	52,914	93,301	129,774
Source: Chauncey M. Depew (ed.), One Hundred Years of American Commerce 1795–1895 p. 111

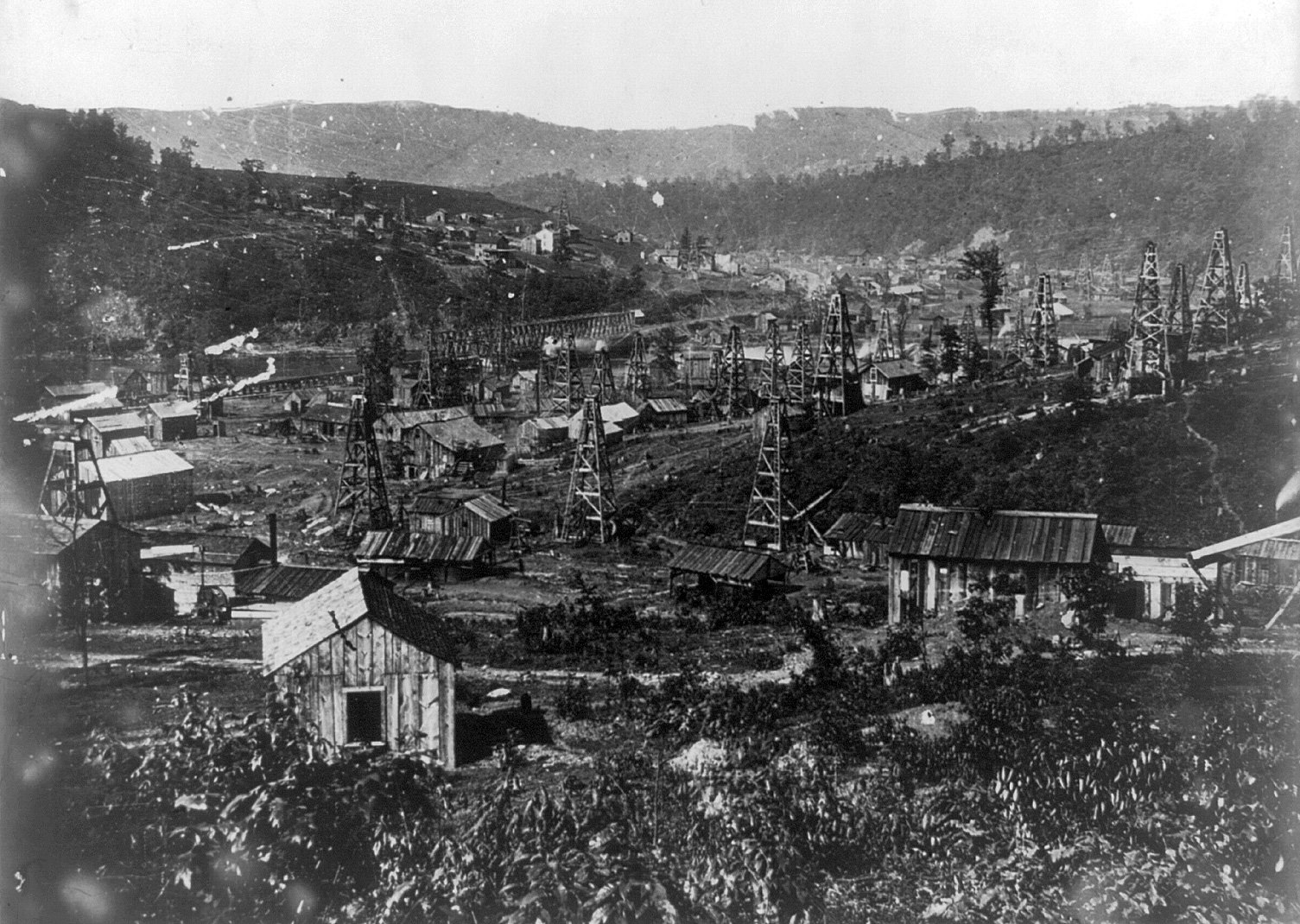
1864, Pennsylvania oil drilling early in the history of the petroleum industry in the United States

Railroad executives invented modern methods for running large-scale business operations, creating a blueprint that all large corporations basically followed. They were first to encounter managerial complexities, labor union issues, and problems of geographical competition. Railroads had to manage safety, traffic and freight over large geographic areas and had to keep track of railcars, which could go missing for months. Railroads also made extensive use of telegraph communications.

Historian Larry Haeg argues from the perspective of the end of the 19th century:

Railroads created virtually every major American industry: coal, oil, gas, steel, lumber, farm equipment, grain, cotton, textile factories, California citrus.

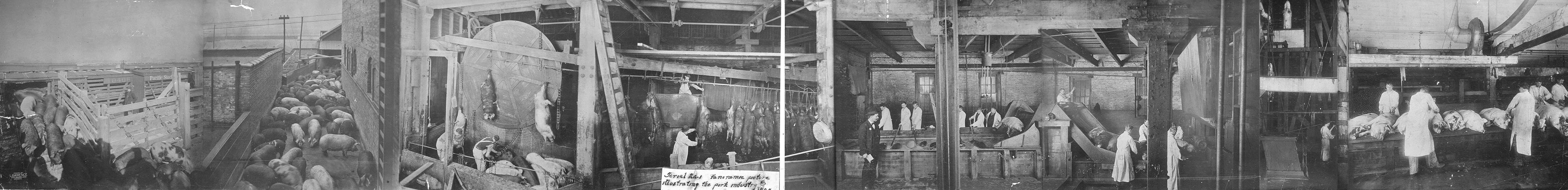
1900 panoramic image of the Chicago slaughter houses

==== Iron industry ====
The most important technological innovation in mid-19th-century pig iron production was the adoption of hot blast, which was developed and patented in Scotland in 1828. Hot blast is a method of using heat from the blast furnace exhaust gas to preheat combustion air, saving a considerable amount of fuel. It allowed much higher furnace temperatures and increased the capacity of furnaces.

Hot blast allowed blast furnaces to use anthracite or lower grade coal. Anthracite was difficult to light with cold blast. High quality metallurgical coking coal deposits of sufficient size for iron making were only available in Great Britain and western Germany in the 19th century, but with less fuel required per unit of iron, it was possible to use lower grade coal.

The use of anthracite was rather short lived because the size of blast furnaces increased enormously toward the end of the century, forcing the use of coke, which was more porous and did not impede the upflow of the gases through the furnace. Charcoal would have been crushed by the column of material in tall furnaces. Also, the capacity of furnaces would have eventually exceeded the wood supply, as happened with locomotives.

Iron was used for a wide variety of purposes. In 1860 large consumers were numerous types of castings, especially stoves. Of the $32 million of bar, sheet and railroad iron produced, slightly less than half was railroad iron. The value added by stoves was equal to the value added by rails.

==== Coal displaces wood ====
Coal replaced wood during the mid-19th century. In 1840 wood was the major fuel while coal production was minor. In 1850 wood was 90% of fuel consumption and 90% of that was for home heating. By 1880 wood was only 5% of fuel consumption. Cast iron stoves for heating and cooking displaced inefficient fireplaces. Wood was a byproduct of land clearing and was placed along the banks of rivers for steamboats. By mid-century the forests were being depleted while steamboats and locomotives were using enough wood to create shortages along their routes; however, railroads, canals and navigable internal waterways were able to bring coal to market at a price far below the cost of wood. Coal sold in Cincinnati for 10 cents per bushel (94 pounds) and in New Orleans for 14 cents.

Charcoal production was labor and land intensive. It was estimated that to fuel a typical sized 100 ton of pig iron per week furnace in 1833 at a sustained yield, a timber plantation of 20,000 acres was required. The trees had to be hauled by oxen to where they were cut, stacked on end and covered with earth or put in a kiln to be charred for about a week. Anthracite reduced labor cost to $2.50 per ton compared to charcoal at $15.50 per ton.

==== Manufacturing ====
Manufacturing became well established during the mid-19th century. Labor in the U.S. was expensive and industry made every effort to economize by using machinery. Woodworking machinery such as circular saws, high speed lathes, planers and mortising machines and various other machines amazed British visitors, as was reported by Joseph Whitworth. See: American system of manufacturing#Use of machinery

In the early 19th century machinery was made mostly of wood with iron parts. By the mid-century machines were being increasingly of all iron, which allowed them to operate at higher speeds and with higher precision. The demand for machinery created a machine tool industry that designed and manufactured lathes, metal planers, shapers and other precision metal cutting tools.

The shoe industry was the second to be mechanized, beginning in the 1840s. Sewing machines were developed for sewing leather. A leather rolling machine eliminated hand hammering, and was thirty times faster. Blanchard lathes began being used for making shoe lasts (forms) in the 1850s, allowing the manufacture of standard sizes.

By the 1850s much progress had been made in the development of the sewing machine, with a few companies making the machines, based on a number of patents, with no company controlling the right combination of patents to make a superior machine. To prevent damaging lawsuits, in 1856 several important patents were pooled under the Sewing Machine Combination, which licensed the patents for a fixed fee per machine sold.

The sewing machine industry was a beneficiary of machine tools and the manufacturing methods developed at the Federal Armories. By 1860 two sewing machine manufacturers were using interchangeable parts.

The sewing machine increased the productivity of sewing cloth by a factor of 5.

In 1860 the textile industry was the largest manufacturing industry in terms of workers employed (mostly women and children), capital invested and value of goods produced. That year there were 5 million spindles in the U.S.

==== Steam power ====
The Treasury Department's steam engine report of 1838 was the most valuable survey of steam power until the 1870 Census. According to the 1838 report there were an estimated 2,000 engines totaling 40,000 hp, of which 64% were used in transportation, mostly in steamboats.

The Corliss steam engine, patented in 1848, was called the most significant development in steam engineering since James Watt. The Corliss engine was more efficient than previous engines and maintained more uniform speed in response to load changes, making it suitable for a wide variety of industrial applications. It was the first steam engine that was suitable for cotton spinning. Previously steam engines for cotton spinning pumped water to a water wheel that powered the machinery.

Steam power greatly expanded during the late 19th century with the rise of large factories, the expanded railroad network and early electric lighting and electric street railways.

==== Steamboats and ships ====
The number of steamboats on western rivers in the U.S. grew from 187 in 1830 to 735 in 1860. Total registered tonnage of steam vessels for the U.S. grew from 63,052 in 1830 to 770,641 in 1860.

Until the introduction of iron ships, the U. S. made the best in the world. The design of U.S. ships required fewer crew members to operate. U.S. made ships cost from 40% to 60% as much as European ships, and lasted longer.

The screw propeller was tested on Lake Ontario in 1841 before being used on ocean ships. Propellers began being used on Great Lakes ships in 1845. Propellers caused vibrations which were a problem for wooden ships. The SS Great Britain, launched in 1845, was the first iron ship with a screw propeller. Iron ships became common and more efficient multiple expansion engines were developed. After the introduction of iron ships, Britain became the leading shipbuilding country. The U.S. tried to compete by building wooden clipper ships, which were fast, but too narrow to carry economic volumes of low value freight.

==== Telegraph ====
Congress approved funds for a short demonstration telegraph line from Baltimore to Washington D.C., which was operational in 1844. The telegraph was quickly adopted by the railroad industry, which needed rapid communication to coordinate train schedules, the importance of which had been highlighted by a collision on the Western Railroad in 1841. Railroads also needed to communicate over a vast network in order to keep track of freight and equipment. Consequently, railroads installed telegraphs lines on their existing right-of-ways. By 1852 there were 22,000 miles of telegraph lines in the U.S., compared to 10,000 miles of track.

==== Urbanization ====
By 1860, on the eve of the Civil War, 16% of the people lived in cities with 2500 or more people and one third of the nation's income came from manufacturing. Urbanized industry was limited primarily to the Northeast; cotton cloth production was the leading industry, with the manufacture of shoes, woolen clothing, and machinery also expanding. Most of the workers in the new factories were immigrants or their children. Between 1845 and 1855, some 300,000 European immigrants arrived annually. Many remained in eastern cities, especially mill towns and mining camps, while those with farm experience and some savings bought farms in the West.

==== Agriculture ====
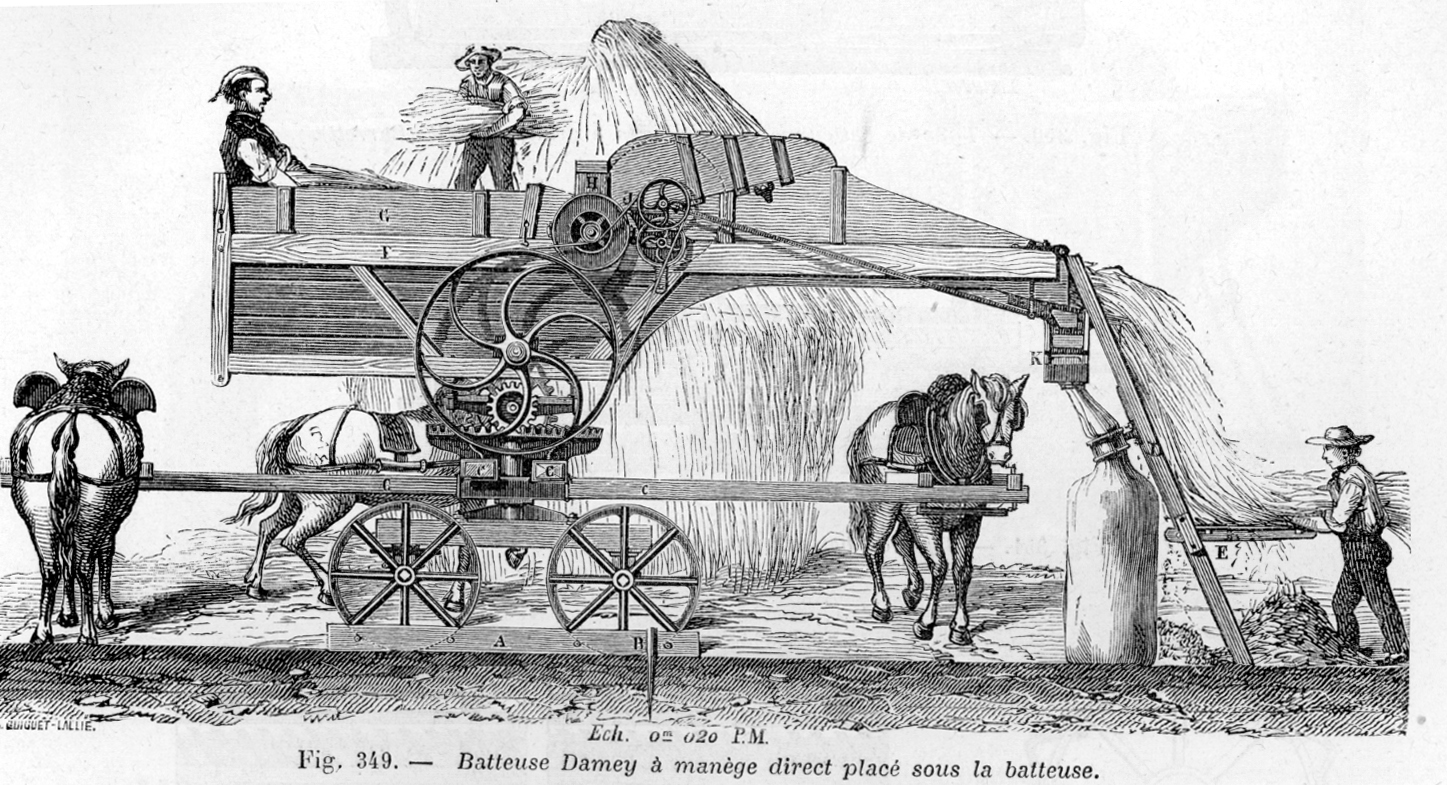
Threshing machine from 1881. Steam engines were also used instead of horses.

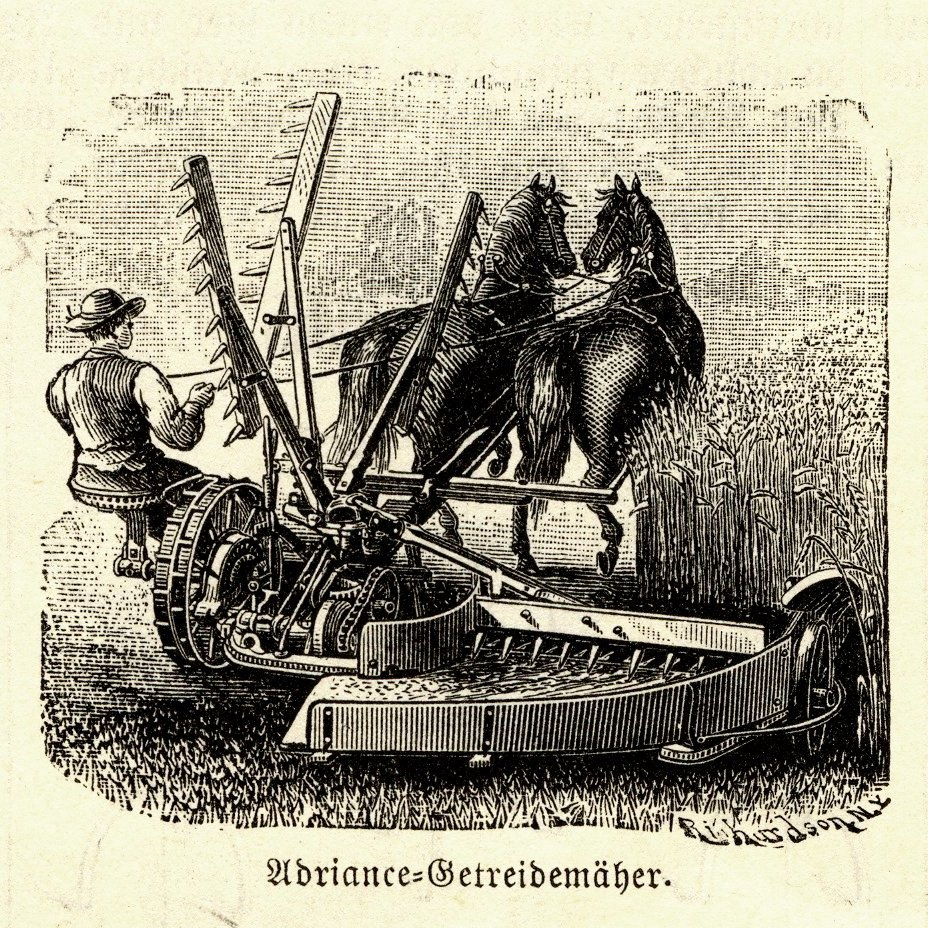
Adriance reaper, late 19th century

In the antebellum period the U.S. supplied 80% of Britain's cotton imports. Just before the Civil War the value of cotton was 61% of all goods exported from the U.S.

The westward expansion into the highly productive heartland was aided by the new railroads, and both population and grain production in the West expanded dramatically. Increased grain production was able to capitalize on high grain prices caused by poor harvests in Europe during the time of the Great Famine in Ireland Grain prices also rose during the Crimean War, but when the war ended U.S. exports to Europe fell dramatically, depressing grain prices. Low grain prices were a cause of the Panic of 1857. Cotton and tobacco prices recovered after the panic.

Agriculture was the largest single industry and it prospered during the war. Prices were high, pulled up by a strong demand from the army and from Britain, which depended on American wheat for a fourth of its food imports.

John Deere developed a cast steel plow in 1837 which was lightweight and had a moldboard that efficiently turned over and shed the plowed earth. It was easy for a horse to pull and was well suited to cutting the thick prairie sod of the Midwest. He and his brother Charles founded Deere and Company which continues into the 21st century as the largest maker of tractors, combines, harvesters and other farm implements.

Threshing machines, which were a novelty at the end of the 18th century, began being widely introduced in the 1830s and 1840s. Mechanized threshing required less than half the labor of hand threshing.

The Civil War acted as a catalyst that encouraged the rapid adoption of horse-drawn machinery and other implements. The rapid spread of recent inventions such as the reaper and mower made the workforce efficient, even as hundreds of thousands of farmers were in the army. Many wives took their place, and often consulted by mail on what to do; increasingly they relied on community and extended kin for advice and help.

The 1862 Homestead Act opened up the public domain lands for free. Land grants to the railroads meant they could sell tracts for family farms (80 to 200 acres) at low prices with extended credit. In addition the government sponsored fresh information, scientific methods and the latest techniques through the newly established Department of Agriculture and the Morrill Land Grant College Act.

===== Slave labor =====
In 1860, there were 4.5 million Americans of Afro-American descent, 4 million of which were slaves, worth $3 billion. They were mainly owned by southern planters of cotton and sugarcane. An estimated 60% of the value of farms in Alabama, Georgia, Louisiana, Mississippi and South Carolina was in slaves, with less than a third in land and buildings.

In the aftermath of the Panic of 1857, which left a number of northern factory workers unemployed and deprived to the point of causing bread riots, supporters of slavery pointed out that slaves were generally better fed and had better living quarters than many free workers. It is estimated that slaves received 15% more in imputed wages than the free market.

=== Finance, money and banking ===
After the expiration of the charter of the Second Bank of the United States, federal revenues were handled by the Independent Treasury beginning in 1846. The Second Bank of the U.S. had also maintained some control over other banks, but in its absence banks were only under state regulation.

One of the main problems with banks was over-issuance of banknotes. These were redeemable in specie (gold or silver) upon presentation to the chief cashier of the bank. When people lost trust in a bank they rushed to redeem its notes, and because banks issued more notes than their specie reserves, the bank couldn't redeem the notes, often causing the bank to fail. In 1860 there were over 8,000 state-chartered banks issuing notes. In 1861 the U.S. began issuing United States Notes as legal tender.

Banks began paying interest on deposits and using the proceeds to make short term call loans, mainly to stock brokers.

New York banks created a clearing house association in 1853 in which member banks cleared accounts with other city banks at the close of the week. The clearinghouse association also handled notes from banks in other parts of the country. The association was able to detect banks that were issuing excessive notes because they could not settle.

==== Panic of 1857 ====
The recovery from the depression that followed the Panic of 1837 began in 1843 and lasted until the Panic of 1857.

The panic was triggered by the August 24 failure of the well regarded Ohio Life Insurance and Trust Co. A manager in the New York branch, one of the city's largest financial institutions, had embezzled funds and made excessive loans. The company's president announced suspension of specie redemption, which triggered a rush to redeem banknotes, causing a number of banks to fail because of lack of specie.

The United States had been running a trade deficit, draining gold out of the country. Because of the tariff revenues, the U.S. Treasury held a considerable amount of gold, which kept it out of circulation. On September 12, the SS Central America, which was carrying $1.5 million in gold from California, sank, contributing to the panic. Secretary of the Treasury Howell Cobb came to the aid of New York mercantile interests by buying back some of the national debt. On September 25 the Bank of Pennsylvania suspended specie payment, starting a nationwide bank run.

The danger of interest bearing deposits became apparent when bankers had to call loans made to stock brokers, many of whom were unable to pay. Banks then had to curtail credit to commercial and industrial customers. Many businesses were unable to pay workers back wages because the banknotes they held were now worthless.

The Crimean War, which had cut off Russian wheat exports, ended in 1856. The war had caused high wheat prices and overexpansion in the U.S., which had been exporting wheat to Europe. Bountiful western harvests in 1857 caused grain prices to fall. Good harvests in England, France and Russia caused collapse in demand for U.S. grains in 1858 and 1859. This caused railroad shipments from the West to fall, which resulted in the bankruptcy of some railroads.

The inability of the West to sell its crops hurt businesses in other regions, such as New England, which manufactured shoes sold in the West. Cotton and tobacco prices fell, but unlike grains, soon recovered.

The panic left northern wage earners unemployed, most temporarily, but high unemployment lingered for a couple of years.

=== Immigration surge ===
Immigration to the U.S. surged following the Great Famine (Ireland). There were about 3 million immigrants during the decade of the 1850s. They were mainly from Germany, Ireland and England.

=== Civil War economy ===
==== Union ====
The Union economy grew and prospered during the war while fielding a large army and navy. The Republicans in Washington had a Whiggish vision of an industrial nation, with great cities, efficient factories, productive farms, all national banks, all knit together by a modern railroad system, to be mobilized by the United States Military Railroad. The South had resisted policies such as tariffs to promote industry and homestead laws to promote farming because slavery would not benefit. With the South gone and Northern Democrats weak, the Republicans enacted their legislation. At the same time they passed new taxes to pay for part of the war and issued large amounts of bonds to pay for most of the rest. Economic historians attribute the remainder of the cost of the war to inflation. Congress wrote an elaborate program of economic modernization that had the dual purpose of winning the war and permanently transforming the economy.

===== Financing the war =====
In 1860 the Treasury was a small operation that funded the small-scale operations of the government through land sales and customs based on a low tariff. Peacetime revenues were trivial in comparison with the cost of a full-scale war but the Treasury Department under Secretary Salmon P. Chase showed unusual ingenuity in financing the war without crippling the economy. A number of new taxes were imposed and always with a patriotic theme comparing the financial sacrifice to the sacrifices of life and limb. The government paid for supplies in official currency, which encouraged people to sell to the government regardless of their politics. By contrast the Confederacy gave paper promissory notes when it seized property, so that even loyal Confederates would hide their horses and mules rather than sell them for dubious paper. Overall the Northern financial system was highly successful in raising money and turning patriotism into profit, while the Confederate system impoverished its patriots.

The United States needed $3.1 billion to pay for the immense armies and fleets raised to fight the Civil War—over $400 million in 1862 alone. Apart from tariffs, the largest revenue by far came from new excise taxes that were imposed on every sort of manufactured item. Second came much higher tariffs, through several Morrill tariff laws. Third came the nation's first income tax; only the wealthy paid and it was repealed at war's end.

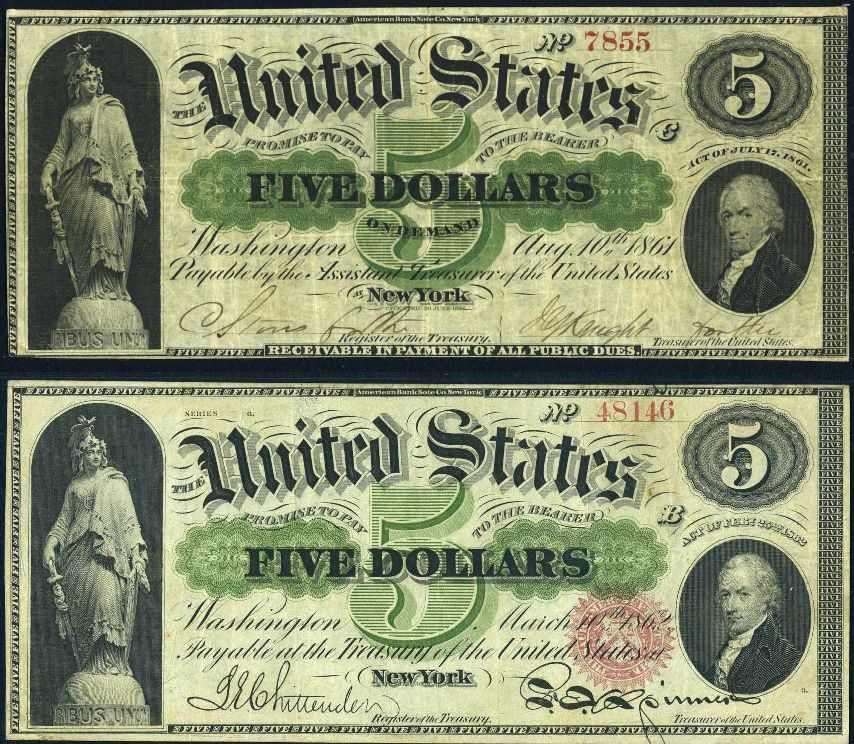
1862 Greenbacks

Apart from taxes, the second major source of income was government bonds. For the first time bonds in small denominations were sold directly to the people, with publicity and patriotism as key factors, as designed by banker Jay Cooke. State banks lost their power to issue banknotes. Only national banks could do that and Chase made it easy to become a national bank; it involved buying and holding federal bonds and financiers rushed to open these banks. Chase numbered them, so that the first one in each city was the "First National Bank". Third, the government printed paper money called "greenbacks". They led to endless controversy because they caused inflation.

The North's most important war measure was perhaps the creation of a system of national banks that provided a sound currency for the industrial expansion. Even more important, the hundreds of new banks that were allowed to open were required to purchase government bonds. Thereby the nation monetized the potential wealth represented by farms, urban buildings, factories, and businesses, and immediately turned that money over to the Treasury for war needs.

====== Tariffs ======
Secretary Salmon P. Chase, though a long-time free-trader, worked with Morrill to pass a second tariff bill in summer 1861, raising rates another 10 points in order to generate more revenues. These subsequent bills were primarily revenue driven to meet the war's needs, though they enjoyed the support of protectionists such as Carey, who again assisted Morrill in the bill's drafting. The Morrill Tariff of 1861 was designed to raise revenue. The tariff act of 1862 served not only to raise revenue but also to encourage the establishment of factories free from British competition by taxing British imports. Furthermore, it protected American factory workers from low paid European workers, and as a major bonus attracted tens of thousands of those Europeans to immigrate to America for high wage factory and craftsman jobs.

Customs revenue from tariffs totaled $345 million from 1861 through 1865 or 43% of all federal tax revenue.

===== Land sales and grants =====
The U.S. government owned vast amounts of good land (mostly from the Louisiana Purchase of 1803 and the Oregon Treaty with Britain in 1846). The challenge was to make the land useful to people and to provide the economic basis for the wealth that would pay off the war debt. Land grants went to railroad construction companies to open up the western plains and link up to California. Together with the free lands provided to farmers by the Homestead Law the low-cost farm lands provided by the land grants sped up the expansion of commercial agriculture in the West.

The 1862 Homestead Act opened up the public domain lands. Land grants to the railroads meant they could sell tracts for family farms (80 to 200 acres) at low prices with extended credit. In addition the government sponsored fresh information, scientific methods and the latest techniques through the newly established Department of Agriculture and the Morrill Land Grant College Act.

===== Agriculture =====
Agriculture was the largest single industry and it prospered during the war. Prices were high, pulled up by a strong demand from the army and from Britain (which depended on American wheat for a fourth of its food imports). The war acted as a catalyst that encouraged the rapid adoption of horse-drawn machinery and other implements. The rapid spread of recent inventions such as the reaper and mower made the workforce efficient, even as hundreds of thousands of farmers were in the army. Many wives took their place and often consulted by mail on what to do; increasingly they relied on community and extended kin for advice and help.

The Union used hundreds of thousands of animals. The Army had plenty of cash to purchase them from farmers and breeders but especially in the early months the quality was mixed. Horses were needed for cavalry and artillery. Mules pulled the wagons. The supply held up, despite an unprecedented epidemic of glanders, a fatal disease that baffled veterinarians. In the South, the Union Army shot all the horses it did not need to keep them out of Confederate hands. The Treasury started buying cotton during the war, for shipment to Europe and northern mills. The sellers were Southern planters who needed the cash, regardless of their patriotism.

==== Collapse of the South ====
The wartime devastation of the South was great and poverty ensued; incomes of whites dropped, but income of the former slaves rose. During Reconstruction railroad construction was heavily subsidized (with much corruption), but the region maintained its dependence on cotton. Former slaves became wage laborers, tenant farmers, or sharecroppers. They were joined by many poor whites, as the population grew faster than the economy. As late as 1940 the only significant manufacturing industries were textile mills (mostly in the upland Carolinas) and some steel in Alabama.

The industrial advantages of the North over the South helped secure a Northern victory in the American Civil War (1861–1865). The Northern victory sealed the destiny of the nation and its economic system. The slave-labor system was abolished; sharecropping emerged and replaced slavery to supply the labor needed for cotton production, but cotton prices plunged in the Panic of 1873, leading Southern plantations to decline in profitability. Northern industry, which had expanded rapidly before and during the war, surged ahead. Industrialists came to dominate multiple aspects of the nation's life, including social and political affairs.

=== Political developments ===
From the 1830s to 1860, Congress repeatedly rejected Whig calls for higher tariffs, and its policies of economic nationalism, which included increased state control, regulation and macroeconomic development of infrastructure. President Andrew Jackson, for example, did not renew the charter of the Second Bank of the United States. The tariff was lowered time and again before the Civil War. Proposals to fund massive western railroad projects, or to give free land to homesteaders, were defeated by Southerners afraid these policies would strengthen the North. The Civil War changed everything.

Territorial expansion of the United States to the area of the Lower 48 States was essentially completed with the Texas annexation (1845), the Oregon Treaty (1846), the Mexican cession (1848) and the Gadsden Purchase (1853).

==== Treasury ====
In 1860 the Treasury was a small operation that funded the small-scale operations of the government through the low tariff and land sales. Revenues were trivial in comparison with the cost of a full-scale war, but the Treasury Department under Secretary Salmon P. Chase showed unusual ingenuity in financing the war without crippling the economy. A number of new taxes were imposed, and always with a patriotic theme comparing the financial sacrifice to the sacrifices of life and limb. The government paid for supplies in real money, which encouraged people to sell to the government regardless of their politics. By contrast the Confederacy gave paper promissory notes when it seized property, so that even loyal Confederates would hide their horses and mules rather than sell them for dubious paper. Overall the Northern financial system was highly successful in raising money and turning patriotism into profit, while the Confederate system impoverished its patriots.

The United States needed $3.1 billion to pay for the immense armies and fleets raised to fight the Civil War — over $400 million just in 1862. The largest tax sum by far came from new excise taxes—a sort of value added tax—that was imposed on every sort of manufactured item. Second came much higher tariffs, through several Morrill tariff laws. Third came the nation's first income tax; only the wealthy paid and it was repealed at war's end.

Apart from taxes, the second major source was government bonds. For the first time bonds in small denominations were sold directly to the people, with publicity and patriotism as key factors, as designed by banker Jay Cooke. State banks lost their power to issue banknotes. Only national banks could do that, and Chase made it easy to become a national bank; it involved buying and holding federal bonds and financiers rushed to open these banks. Chase numbered them, so that the first one in each city was the "First National Bank". Fourth the government printed "greenbacks"—paper money—which were controversial because they caused inflation.

Secretary Chase, though a long-time free-trader, worked with Congressman Justin Morrill to pass a second tariff bill in summer 1861, raising rates another 10 points in order to generate more revenues. These subsequent bills were primarily revenue driven to meet the war's needs, though they enjoyed the support of protectionists such as Carey, who again assisted Morrill in the bill's drafting. The Morrill Tariff of 1861 was designed to raise revenue. The tariff act of 1862 served not only to raise revenue, but also to encourage the establishment of factories free from British competition by taxing British imports. Furthermore, it protected American factory workers from low paid European workers, and as a major bonus attracted tens of thousands of those Europeans to immigrate to America for high wage factory and craftsman jobs.

==== Land grants ====
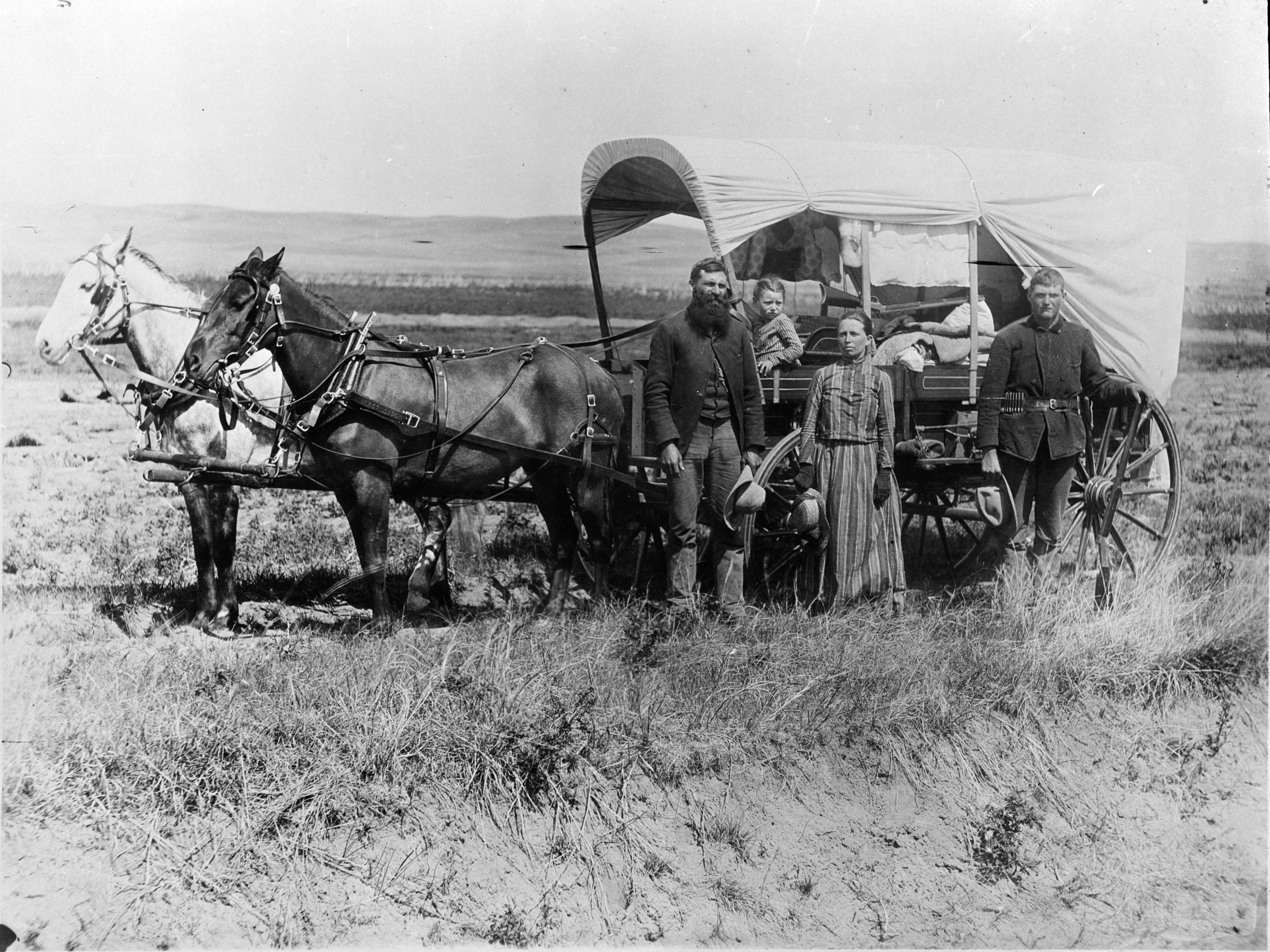
Homesteaders in central Nebraska in 1886

1878 Map of the United States showing land-grants made for railroads and wagon trails.

The U.S. government owned vast amounts of quality land (mostly from the Louisiana Purchase of 1803 and the Oregon Treaty with Britain in 1846). The challenge was to make the land useful to people and to provide the economic basis for the wealth that would pay off the war debt. The government did this by breaking it up into smaller plots for private ownership, through various federal laws.

Bounty-land warrants were issued to military veterans in the United States from 1775 to 1855. The land grants were used extensively for settlement of pre-Louisiana Purchase lands east of the Mississippi River, including the Ohio Country, the Northwest Territory, and the Platte Purchase in Missouri.

About 180 million acres were granted to railroad construction companies between 1850 and 1871. The Land Grant Act of 1850 provided for 3.75 million acres of land to the states to support railroad projects; by 1857 21 million acres of public lands were used for railroads in the Mississippi River valley, and the stage was set for more substantial Congressional subsidies to future railroads.

The Pacific Railroad Acts financed several transcontinental railroads by granting land directly to corporations for the first time. In addition to operating revenues, railroads were able to finance networks crossing vast distances by selling granted property adjacent to the tracks; these would become highly desirable plots for new settlers and businesses because of the easy access to long-distance transportation.

Morrill Land-Grant Acts starting in 1860 benefited colleges and universities.

Various Homestead Acts distributed land nearly for free in return for improvements such as building a house, farming, or planting trees. Between 1862 and 1934, the federal government granted 1.6 million homesteads and distributed 270,000,000 acres (420,000 mi^{2}) of federal land for private ownership. This was a total of 10% of all land in the United States. Eligibility for the last such program, in Alaska, ended in 1986. The Land Office made about 100 million acres of direct sales in the western United States from 1850 to 1900, benefiting cattle ranchers and speculators.

The economic and military power of the federal government was used to clear Native Americans from land desired by European-American settlers. Land grants creating the Indian Reservation system were used by the Indian Appropriations Act of 1851 to segregate native tribes, but later acts opened some of that land to white settlement, notably including a land run opening the Unassigned Lands in Oklahoma. The Dawes Act of 1887 pressured Native Americans to assimilate to European-American culture, offering former tribal land to individuals separating from their tribes and putting "surplus" reservation land up for auction. Overall, about half of Indian Reservation land was sold to white Americans by 1906, about 75 million acres.

==== Banking ====
The North's most important war measure was perhaps the creation of a system of national banks that provided a sound currency for the industrial expansion. Even more important, the hundreds of new banks that were allowed to open were required to purchase government bonds. Thereby the nation monetized the potential wealth represented by farms, urban buildings, factories, and businesses, and immediately turned that money over to the Treasury for war needs.

==== Education ====
British Parliamentary Committee members Joseph Whitworth and George Wallis were impressed at the educational level of workers in the U.S., commenting that "so that everybody reads ... and intelligence penetrates through the lowest grades of society." They also remarked that most states had compulsory education laws requiring a minimum of three months per year schooling for child factory workers.

==== Civil War ====
The Union grew rich fighting the war, as the Confederate economy was destroyed. The Republicans in control in Washington had a Whig vision of an industrial nation, with great cities, efficient factories, productive farms, national banks, and high-speed rail links. The South had resisted policies such as tariffs to promote industry and homestead laws to promote farming because slavery would not benefit; with the South gone, and Northern Democrats very weak in Congress, the Republicans enacted their legislation. At the same time they passed new taxes to pay for part of the war, and issued large amounts of bonds to pay for most of the rest. (The remainder can be charged to inflation.) They wrote an elaborate program of economic modernization that had the dual purpose of winning the war and permanently transforming the economy. The key policy-maker in Congress was Thaddeus Stevens, as chairman of the Ways and Means Committee. He took charge of major legislation that funded the war effort and revolutionized the nation's economic policies regarding tariffs, bonds, income and excise taxes, national banks, suppression of money issued by state banks, greenback currency, and western railroad land grants.

Historians have debated whether or not the Civil War sped up the rate of economic growth in the face of destruction throughout the South and the diversion of resources to military supplies and away from civilian goods. In any case the war taught new organizational methods, prioritized engineering skills, and shifted the national attention from politics to business.

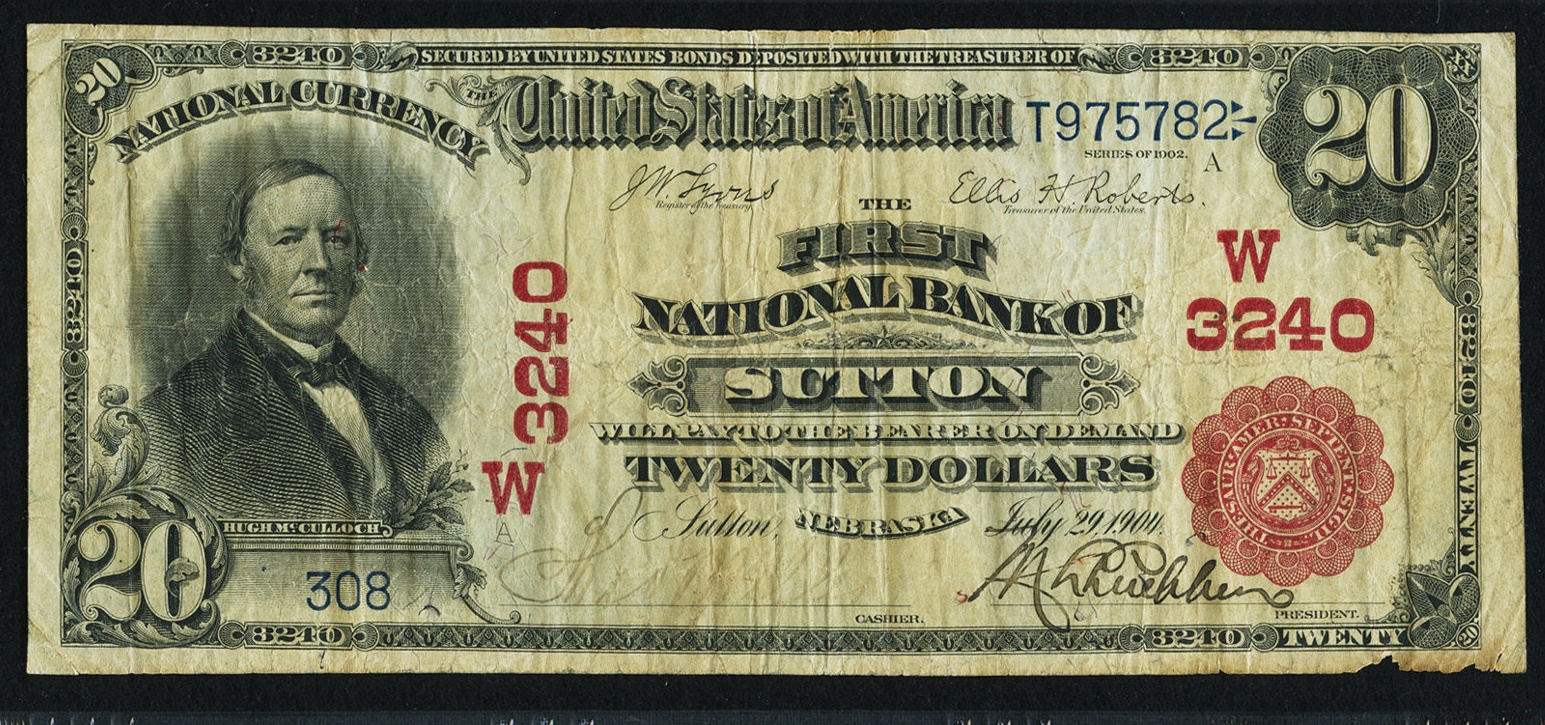
$20 banknote with portrait of Secretary of the Treasury Hugh McCulloch

=== Financial issues of reconstruction ===
The Civil War had been financed primarily by issuing short-term and long-term bonds and loans, inflation caused by printing paper money, and new taxes. Wholesale prices had more than doubled, and reduction of inflation was a priority for Secretary of the Treasury Hugh McCulloch. A high priority, and by far the most controversial, was the currency question. The old paper currency issued by state banks had been withdrawn, and Confederate currency became worthless. The national banks had issued $207 million in currency, which was backed by gold and silver. The federal treasury had issued $428 million in greenbacks, which was legal tender but not backed by gold or silver. In addition, about $275 million of coin was in circulation. The new administration policy announced in October would be to make all the paper convertible into specie, if Congress so voted. The House of Representatives passed the Alley Resolution on December 18, 1865, by vote of 144 to 6. In the Senate it was a different matter, for the key player was Senator John Sherman, who said that inflation contraction was not nearly as important as refunding the short-term and long-term national debt. The war had been largely financed by national debt, in addition to taxation and inflation. The national debt stood at $2.8 billion. By October 1865, most of it in short term and temporary loans.

Wall Street bankers typified by Jay Cooke believed that the economy was about to grow rapidly, thanks to the development of agriculture through the Homestead Act, the expansion of railroads, especially rebuilding the devastated Southern railroads and opening the transcontinental line to the West Coast, and especially the flourishing of manufacturing during the war. The goal premium over greenbacks was hundred and $145 in greenbacks to $100 in gold, and the optimists thought that the heavy demand for currency in an era of prosperity would return the ratio to 100. A compromise was reached in April 1866, that limited the treasury to a currency contraction of only $10 million over six months. Meanwhile, the Senate refunded the entire national debt, but the House failed to act. By early 1867, postwar prosperity was a reality, and the optimists wanted an end to contraction, which Congress ordered in January 1868. Meanwhile, the Treasury issued new bonds at a lower interest rate to refinance the redemption of short-term debt. while the old state bank notes were disappearing from circulation, new national bank notes, backed by species, were expanding. By 1868 inflation was minimal.

== Late 19th century ==
=== Commerce, industry and agriculture ===
In the last third of the 19th century, the United States entered a phase of rapid economic growth that doubled per capita income over this period. By 1895, the United States leaped ahead of Britain for first place in manufacturing output. For the first time, exports of machinery and consumer goods became important. For example, Standard Oil led the way in exporting kerosene; Russia was its main rival in international trade. Singer Corporation led the way in developing a global marketing strategy for its sewing machines.

The greatly expanded railroad network, using inexpensive steel rails produced by new steel making processes, dramatically lowered transportation cost to areas without access to navigable waterways. Low freight rates allowed large manufacturing facilities with great economies of scale. Machinery became a large industry and many types of machines were developed. Businesses were able to operate over wide areas and chain stores arose. Mail order companies started operating. Rural Free Delivery began in the early 1890s, but it was not widely implemented for a decade.

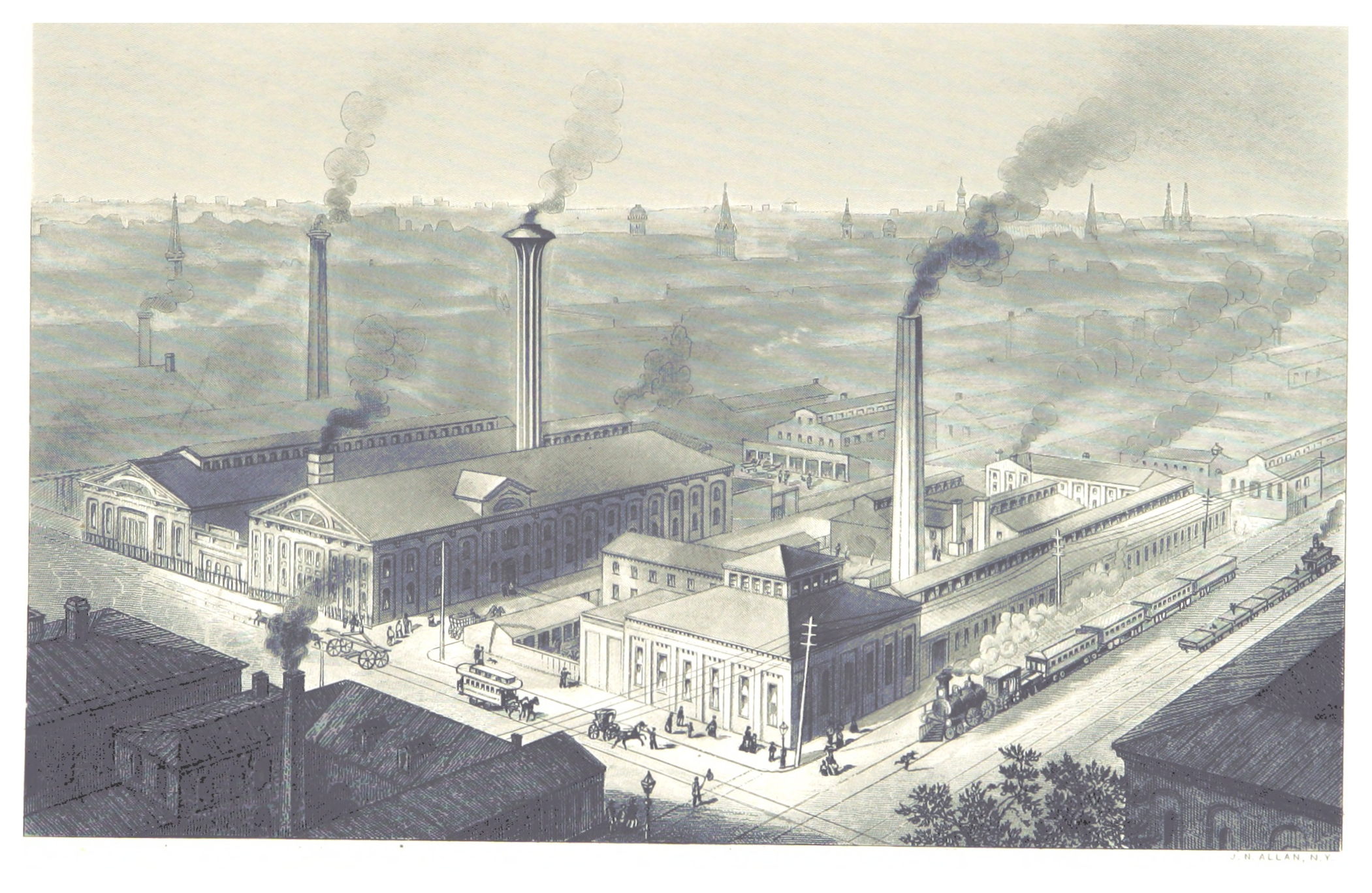
William Sellers & Company in Philadelphia, 1876

Companies created new management systems to carry out their operations on a large scale. Companies integrated processes to eliminate unnecessary steps and to eliminate middlemen.

An explosion of new discoveries and inventions took place, a process called the Second Industrial Revolution. The electric light, telephone, steam turbine, internal combustion engine, automobile, phonograph, typewriter and tabulating machine were some of the many inventions of the period. New processes for making steel and chemicals such as dyes and explosives were invented. The pneumatic tire, improved ball bearings, machine tools and newly developed metal stamping techniques enabled the large scale production of bicycles in the 1890s. Another significant development was the widespread introduction of electric street railways (trams, trolleys or streetcars) in the 1890s.

Improvements in transportation and other technological progress caused prices to fall, especially during the so-called long depression, but the rising amount of gold and silver being mined eventually resulted in mild inflation during the 1890s and beyond.

Table 3: Ten leading U.S. industries by value added (millions of 1914 $'s)
1860		1880		1900		1920	
Industry	Value added	Industry	Value added	Industry	Value added	Industry	Value added
Cotton goods	59	Machinery	111	Machinery	432	Machinery	576
Lumber	54	Iron and steel	105	Iron and steel	339	Iron and steel	493
Boots and shoes	53	Cotton goods	97	Printing and publishing	313	Lumber	393
Flour and meal	43	Lumber	87	Lumber	300	Cotton goods	364
Men's clothing	39	Boots and shoes	82	Clothing	262	Shipbuilding	349
Machinery	31	Men's clothing	78	Liquor	224	Automotive	347
Woolen goods	27	Flour and meal	64	Cotton goods	196	General shop construction	328
Leather goods	24	Woolen goods	60	Masonry and brick	140	Printing and publishing	268
Cast iron	23	Printing	58	General shop construction	131	Electrical machinery	246
Printing	20	Liquor	44	Meatpacking	124	Clothing	239
Source: Joel Mokyr

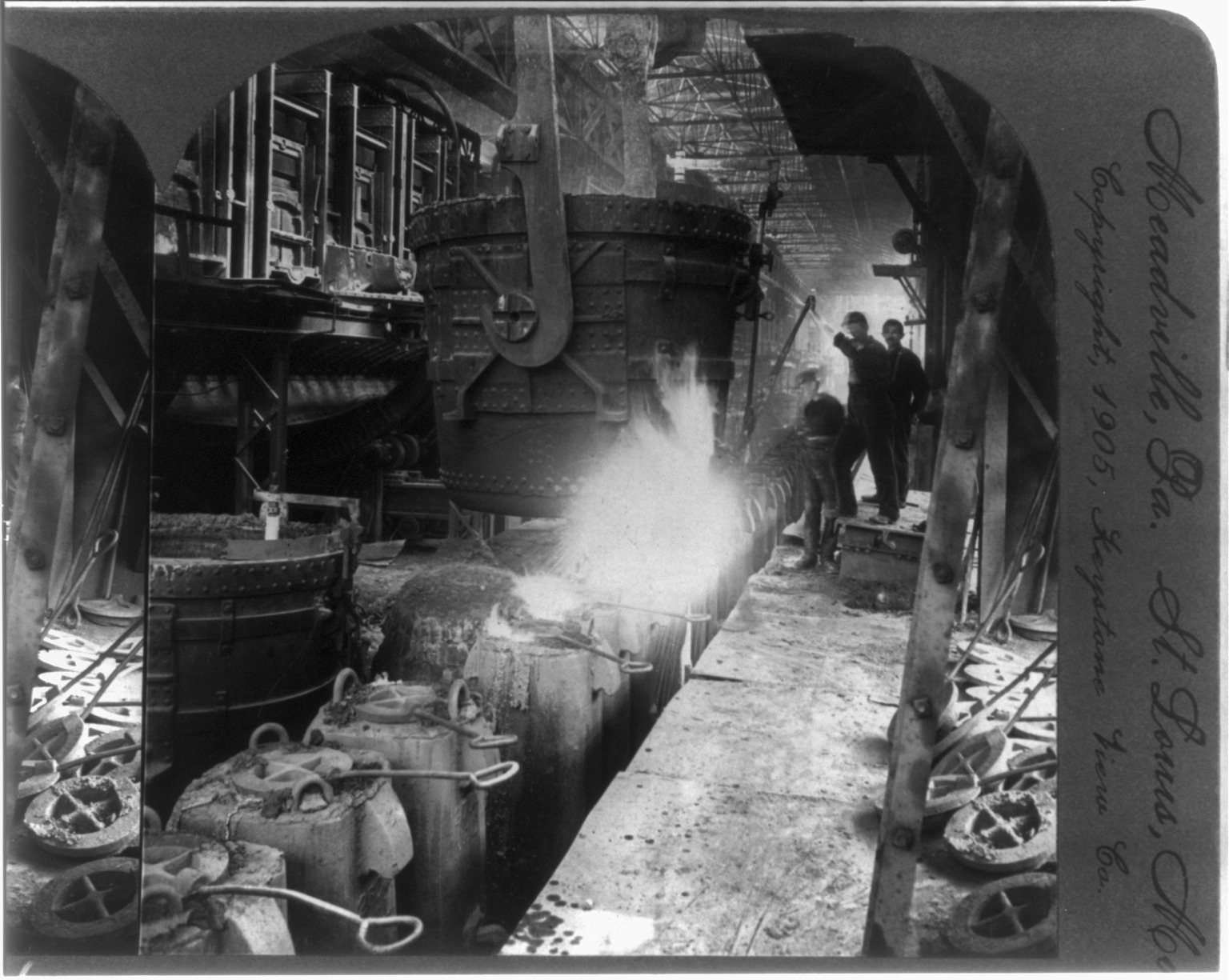
Steel workers in 1905, Meadville, Philadelphia

==== Railroads ====
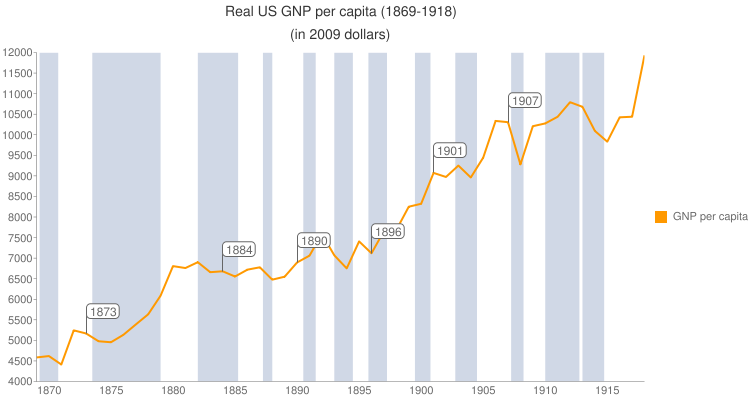
Real gross national product per capita of the United States 1869–1918

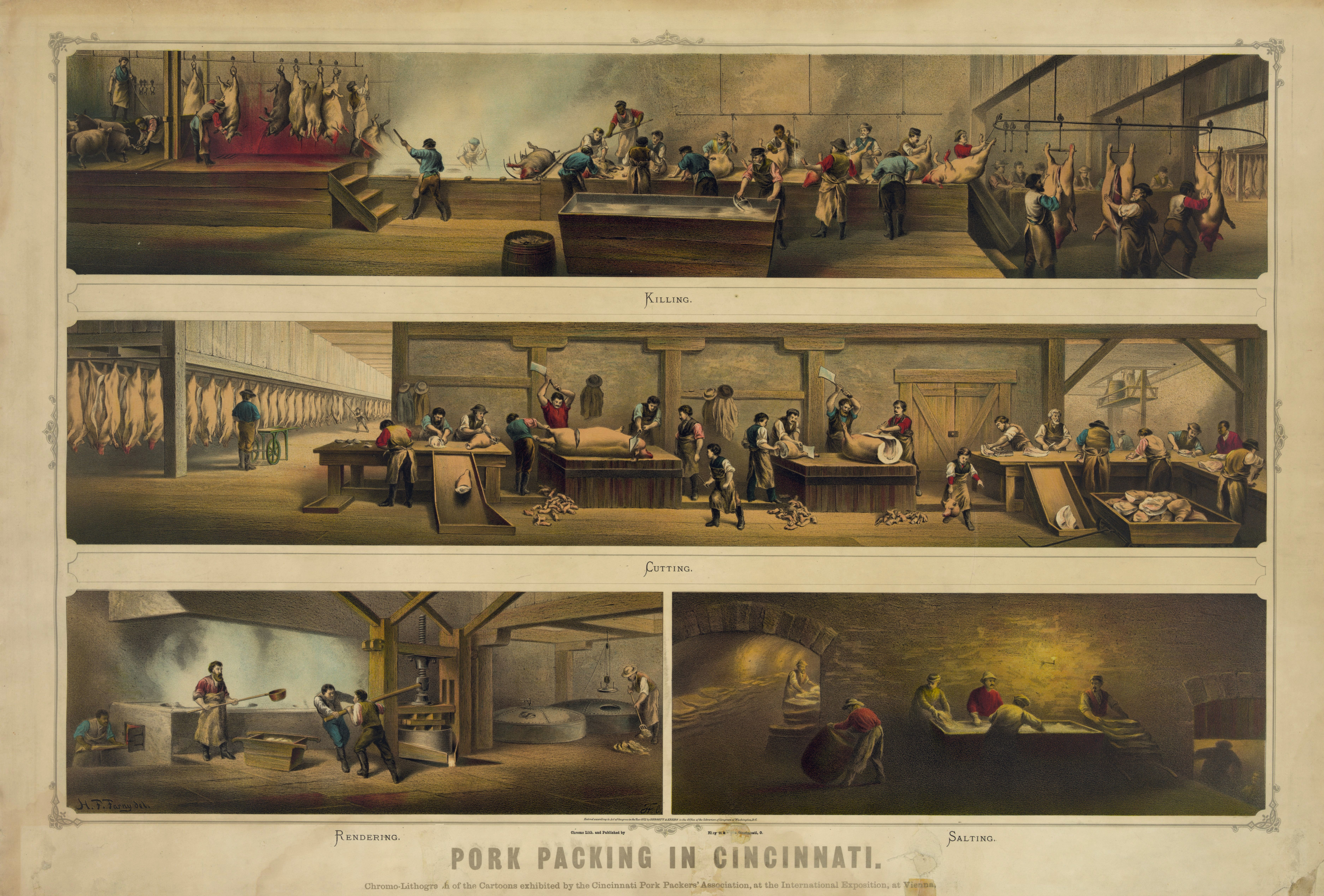
Pork packing in Cincinnati, 1873

Railroads saw their greatest growth in new track added in the last three decades of the 19th century. (See Table 2) Railroads also enjoyed high productivity growth during this time, mainly because of the introduction of new processes that made steel inexpensive. Steel rails lasted roughly ten times longer than iron rails. Steel rails, which became heavier as steel prices fell, enabled heavier, more powerful locomotives that could pull longer trains. Rail cars made of steel on steel rails could be made longer and cars and a load carrying to car weight ratio of 2:1 compared to cars made of iron at 1:1.

In 1890 David Ames Wells estimated wagon transport at 16 cents per ton-mile compared to railroads at less than one cent per ton-mile.

Railroads competed fiercely for passengers and freight by expanding their routes, too often into increasingly marginal ones. The high capital required for expansion plus the low rates, driven by competition and by what the market would bear, resulted in a large percentage of railroad track in bankruptcy.

A practical refrigerated (ice cooled) railcar was introduced in 1881. This made it possible to ship cattle and hog carcasses, which weighed only 40% as much as live animals. Gustavus Franklin Swift developed an integrated network of cattle procurement, slaughtering, meat-packing and shipping meat to market. Up to that time cattle were driven great distances to railroad shipping points, causing the cattle to lose considerable weight. Swift developed a large business, which grew in size with the entry of several competitors.

==== Steel ====
In the last three decades of the 19th century iron and steel became a leading industry, in second place by value added, with machinery being in first place. The Bessemer process was the first large scale process for producing steel, which it was able to do at low cost. The first U.S. licensed Bessemer plant began operation in 1865. Bessemer steel was used mostly for rails. Due to difficulty in controlling quality and embrittlement with aging, Bessemer steel was not suitable for structural purposes.

The Siemens-Martin process, or open hearth process, produced a suitable grade of structural steel. Open hearth steel displaced wrought iron as a structural material in the 1880s. Open hearth steel began being used in a wide variety of applications including high rise buildings, ships, machinery, pipelines, rails and bridges.

==== Electric lights and electric street railways ====
Early electrification was too limited to have a big impact on the late 19th-century economy. Electricity was also very expensive because of the low conversion efficiency of fuel to power, the small scale of power plants and the fact that most utilities offered only nighttime service. Daytime service became common during the early 20th century after the introduction of the AC motor, which tended to be used more during the day, balancing the load. Until that time a large share of power was self-generated by the user, such as a factory, hotel or electric street railway (tram or streetcar).

Electric street railways were introduced in the U.S. in 1888 when Frank J. Sprague designed and built the first practical system, the Richmond Union Passenger Railway in Richmond, Virginia. Electric street railways rapidly spread to cities around the country in the following years.

The early electric street railways typically generated their own power and also operated as electric utilities, which served to even out daily load because the main use of power for lighting was after the peak usage by railways.

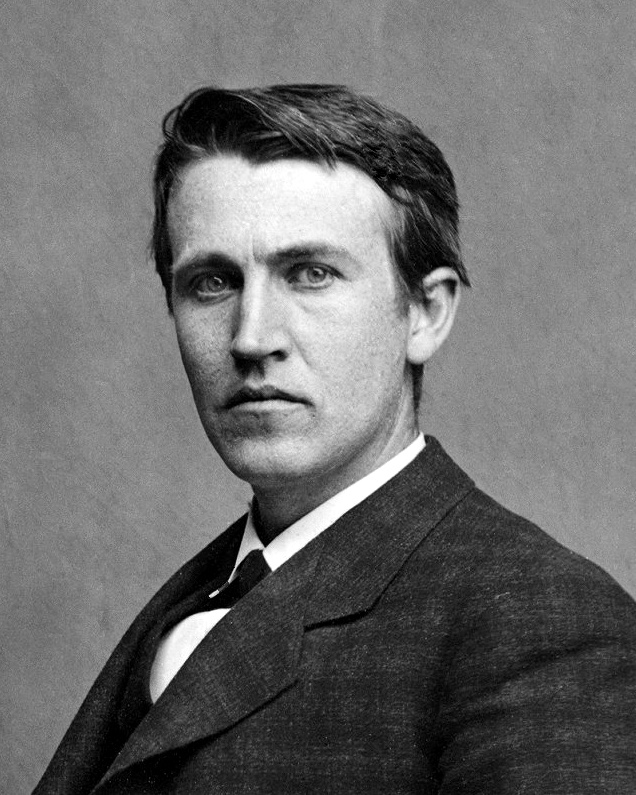
Thomas Edison in 1877

Until the early 1880s electricity had been used mainly in telegraphy and electroplating. Efficient dynamos were introduced in the 1870s and began being used to power electric carbon arc lamps after 1879. In 1880 Thomas Edison patented his invention of a long lasting incandescent light bulb and a system for distributing electrical power. In 1882 he opened the Pearl Street Station in Manhattan, which was the first central power station in the U.S.

Using DC placed severe restrictions on the distance power could be transmitted due to power losses. With DC there was no way to transform power to high voltages, which would have reduced the current and lowered the transmission losses. Power can be safely generated to about 2000 volts, but this is a dangerous voltage for household use. With alternating current voltage can be changed up or down using a transformer. AC power began being widely introduced in the 1890s.

==== Communications ====
Following the failure of the first short lived Transatlantic telegraph cable of 1858, a second, more durable cable was completed in 1865, connecting Nova Scotia to England. By 1890 there was an international telegraph network.

After the invention of the telephone in 1876 additional development work was required to make it commercially viable. The first telephones were for local calls. Long-distance calling came into being in the 1890s, but the technology to make transcontinental calls took until 1915 to be operational.

Automatic telephone switching, which eliminated the need for telephone operators to manually connect local calls on a switchboard, was introduced in 1892; however it did not become widespread for several decades.

==== Modern business management ====
Before railroads most businesses were run by a sole proprietor or were a partnership. The owners typically ran the daily operations. The railroad industry was the first to adopt modern business management practices in response to the need to operate over vast areas, to maintain continuous long-distance communications, to manage a complex network, to track trains and freight. Railroads hired professional managers and divided work into various corporate departments, and developed the organization diagram.

Another modern business innovation was vertical integration, by which companies expanded to encompass all stages of a business, from producing the raw materials, processing them into saleable products and selling the finished products. Notable examples occurred in the steel and petroleum industries.

==== Agriculture ====
A dramatic expansion in farming took place. The number of farms tripled from 2.0 million in 1860 to 6.0 million in 1905. The number of people living on farms grew from about 10 million in 1860 to 22 million in 1880 to 31 million in 1905. The value of farms soared from $8.0 billion in 1860 to $30 billion in 1906.

The federal government issued 160-acre (65 ha) tracts virtually free to settlers under the Homestead Act of 1862. Even larger numbers of settlers purchased lands at very low interest from the new railroads, which were trying to create markets. The railroads advertised heavily in Europe and brought over, at low fares, hundreds of thousands of farmers from Northern Europe.

Despite their remarkable progress and general prosperity, 19th-century U.S. farmers experienced recurring cycles of hardship, caused primarily by falling world prices for cotton and wheat.

Along with the mechanical improvements which greatly increased yield per unit area, the amount of land under cultivation grew rapidly throughout the second half of the century, as the railroads opened up new areas of the West for settlement. The wheat farmers enjoyed abundant output and good years from 1876 to 1881 when bad European harvests kept the world price high. They then suffered from a slump in the 1880s when conditions in Europe improved. The farther west the settlers went, the more dependent they became on the monopolistic railroads to move their goods to market, and the more inclined they were to protest, as in the Populist movement of the 1890s. Wheat farmers blamed local grain elevator owners (who purchased their crop), railroads and eastern bankers for the low prices. Sales of various types of horse pulled harvesting machines increased dramatically between the Civil war and the end of the century. Harvesting machine improvements included automatic rakers, which eliminated the manual raker, allowing operation by a single man, and combination harvester and binders.

To modernize traditional agriculture reformers founded the Grange movement, in 1867. The Granges focused initially on social activities to counter the isolation most farm families experienced. Women's participation was actively encouraged. Spurred by the Panic of 1873, the Grange soon grew to 20,000 chapters and 1.5 million members. The Granges set up their own marketing systems, stores, processing plants, factories and cooperatives. Most went bankrupt. The movement also enjoyed some political success during the 1870s. A few Midwestern states passed "Granger Laws", limiting railroad and warehouse fees.

Federal land grants helped each state create an agricultural college and a network of extension agents who demonstrated modern techniques to farmers. Wheat and cotton farmers in the 1890s supported the Populist movement, but failed in their demands for free silver and inflation. Instead the 1896 election committed the nation to the gold standard and a program of sustained industrialization. Farmers in the Midwest and East gave verbal support to the Populists. They focused on the nearby urban markets, rather than on highly fluctuating European markets for weaving cotton.

==== Oil, minerals and mining ====
===== Oil =====
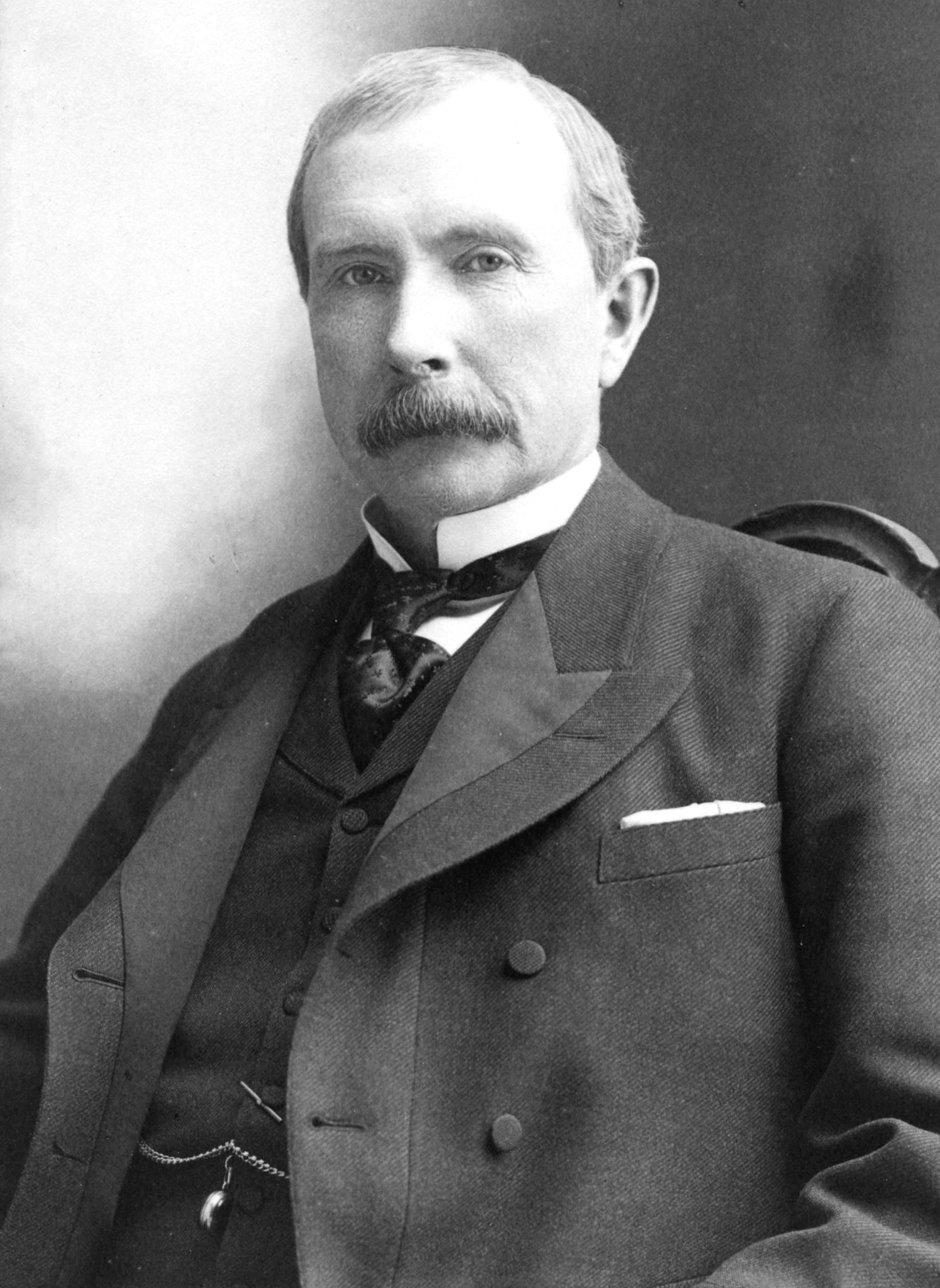
John D. Rockefeller

In the 1850s an advance in lighting was the use of kerosene lamps with glass chimneys, which produced a good quality light at a relatively affordable price. Kerosene lighting effectively extended the day and made it easier to read at night. An industry developed to produce coal oil, as kerosene was then called. Kerosene was also being distilled from Pennsylvania crude oil by Samuel Kier.

George Bissell paid a visit to Dartmouth College, which he had attended, and saw a sample of "rock oil" from Pennsylvania. Suspecting that the oil may have potential as an illuminant and lubricant, he organized an investor group. In 1853 Bissell's group, which became the Pennsylvania Rock Oil Co., hired Yale chemistry professor Benjamin Silliman Jr. to perform an analysis of "rock oil". Silliman's report of April 1864 stated that "rock oil" could yield an excellent illuminating oil. However, there was no economical means for producing sufficient commercial quantities of oil. Bissell had a chance insight when he saw a picture of oil derricks used to produce an oil based patent medicine obtained as a byproduct of a brine well.

Following a shareholder disagreement, Bissell and fellow investor Jonathan Eveleth investor split with Pennsylvania Rock Oil Co. and formed Seneca Oil in 1858. Edwin Drake, a shareholder, was hired by the company to drill for oil. The site chosen to drill the well was on Oil Creek near Titusville, PA, where a water well was producing oil. Drake chose to use brine well drilling technology based on the technique used in China since ancient times that reached the West in the late 1820s, except that Drake used iron cable, an iron well casing and a steam engine. The Drake Well hit oil at a depth of 69.55 feet on August 27, 1858, starting a drilling boom in the region.

Among the numerous refineries that were started were several along a new rail link to Cleveland, Ohio, where John D. Rockefeller and his partner Maurice Clark owned a grocery produce shipping business. Rockefeller and Clark also got into the refining business, and in 1865 the partners decided to hold a private auction between the two, with Rockefeller being the successful bidder. The refining industry was intensely competitive, and by 1869 there was three times the capacity needed, a situation which lasted many years, with the number of refineries reaching 6000.

In 1870 John D. Rockefeller, his brother William Rockefeller, Henry Flagler, Oliver Burr Jennings and silent partner Stephen V. Harkness formed Standard Oil. John D. Rockefeller was the master planner and organizer of the systematic plan to form combinations with or acquire competitors and enter all phases of the oil industry from production to transportation, refining and distribution, a concept called vertical integration. Standard Oil sought every possible advantage over its competitors. One method was using Standard's high shipping volume to secure discounts and drawbacks (payments from railroads for transporting competitors products) from railroads. By 1879 Standard oil controlled 90% of U.S. refining capacity. Producers in the Pennsylvania oil region tried to counter Standard Oil's transportation arrangements by building the first long distance pipeline, the 110 mile long Tidewater Pipeline to Williamsport, Pennsylvania, which was on the Reading Railroad. Standard Oil fought back by building four pipelines of its own. Standard continued to monopolize the oil industry in the U.S. until it was broken up by the 1911 U.S. Supreme Court case Standard Oil Co. of New Jersey v. United States.

Efficient gas mantles and electric lighting were eroding the illuminating oil market beginning in the 1880s; however a previously low value byproduct of refining was gasoline, which more than offset the role of kerosene in the early 20th century.

===== Coal =====
Coal was found in abundance in the Appalachian Mountains from Pennsylvania south to Kentucky.

===== Iron ore =====
Large iron ore mines opened in the Lake Superior region of the upper Midwest. Steel mills thrived in places where these coal and iron ore could be brought together to produce steel. Large copper and silver mines opened, followed by lead mines and cement factories.

==== Finance, money and banking ====
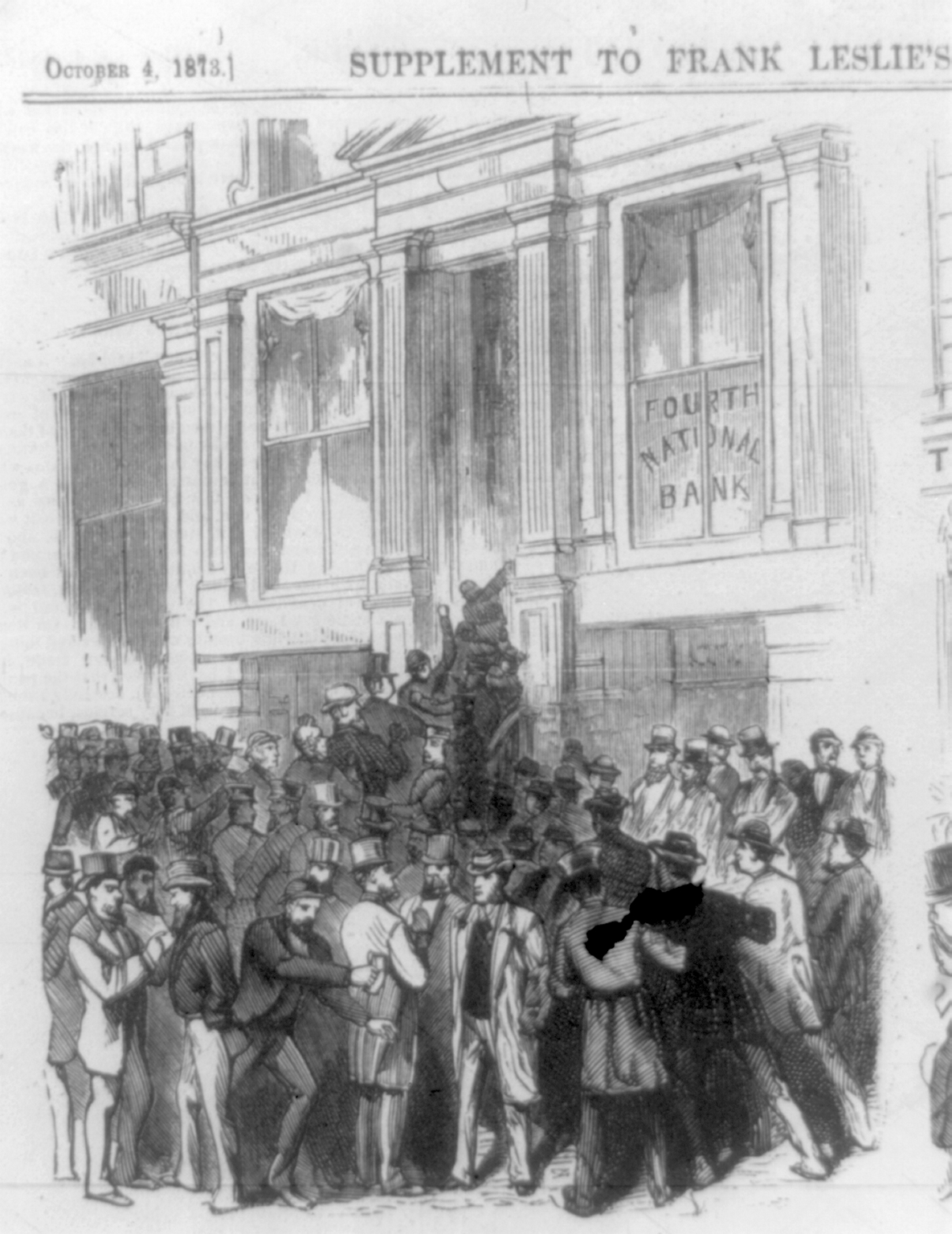
A bank run on the Fourth National Bank No. 20 Nassau Street, New York City, October 4, 1873

During the period, a series of recessions happened. The recession of 1869 resulted from a stock market panic, which lowered stock prices 20% and briefly cut wheat prices in half. It was one of the shortest and mildest recessions in American economic history.

Panic of 1873 created one of the worst and longest depressions (which then meant depressed prices) in American history, seriously affecting every aspect of the economy and bringing the railroad expansion to a halt. The New York Stock Exchange closed for ten days. Of the country's 364 railroads, 89 went bankrupt, a total of 18,000 businesses failed between 1873 and 1875, unemployment reached 14% by 1876, during a time which became known in Britain as the Long Depression. Contemporary economist David Ames Wells argued against calling it a depression in the U.S. because output rose dramatically.

Politically, the Democrats took control of Congress in 1874, the election of 1876 was deadlocked.

The end of the Gilded Age coincided with the Panic of 1893, a deep depression that lasted until 1897. Wheat and cotton farmers in the West and South were especially hard hit, and moved toward radicalism. President Grover Cleveland was forced to ask the Wall Street bankers to help keep the Treasury liquid. Agrarian spokesmen William Jennings Bryan called for an inflationary policy of using cheap silver to effectively replace expensive gold. Bryan lost in a major political realignment in favor of the conservative pro-gold Republicans in the election of 1896.

==== Water supply and sewers ====
Europe had a substantial amount of water supply and sewer infrastructure installed by the mid-1870s. In 1880 only 0.3% of urban households had filtered water, with this figure rising to 1.5% in 1890 and 6.3% in 1900.

==== Labor unions ====
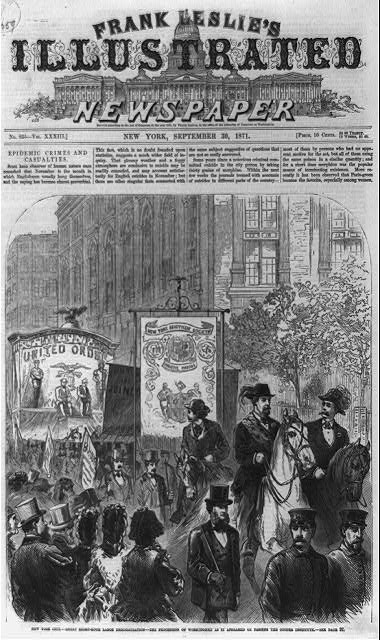
Workers in New York in 1871 demand the eight-hour day

The American labor movement began with the first significant labor union, the Knights of Labor in 1869. The Knights collapsed in the 1880s and were displaced by strong international unions that banded together as the American Federation of Labor under Samuel Gompers. Rejecting socialism, the AFL unions negotiated with owners for higher wages and better working conditions. Union growth was slow until 1900, then grew to a peak during World War I.

==== Political developments ====
Concern over railroads' unfair practices, such as freight rates favoring certain shippers, led to the Interstate Commerce Act of 1887 which created the nation's first regulatory agency, the Interstate Commerce Commission.

==== Trade and tariffs ====
From the Civil War to 1913, the United States had a high tariff regime, as did most countries with the exception of Great Britain, which clung to free trade.

Most Democrats wanted a lower tariff, but failed to make much difference. The Republican Party stressed the goal of rapid economic growth, as well as high wage rates for industrial workers. Indeed, the high American wage rates attracted large numbers of skilled European workers, who filled the upper ranks of the American working class. According to Benjamin O. Fordham the United States:

Protectionism had several important consequences for American foreign policy on both economic and security issues. It led to a focus on less developed areas of the world that would not export manufactured goods to the United States instead of on wealthier European markets. It limited the tactics available for promoting American exports, forcing policymakers to seek exclusive bilateral agreements or unilateral concessions from trading partners instead of multilateral arrangements. It inhibited political cooperation with other major powers and implied an aggressive posture toward these states.

== Early 20th century ==
=== Economic growth and the 1910 break ===
The period from 1890 to 1910 was one of rapid economic growth of above 7%, in part due to rapid population growth. However, a sharp break in the growth rate to around 2.8% occurred from 1910 to 1929. Economists are uncertain what combination of supply and demand factors caused the break, but productivity growth was strong, enabling the labor cost per unit of output to decline from 1910 to 1929. The growth rate in hours worked fell 57% compared to the decline in the growth rate of output of 27%. It is generally accepted that the new technologies and more efficient business methods permanently shifted the supply and demand relationship for labor, with labor being in surplus (except during both world wars when the economy was engaged in war-time production and millions of men served in the armed forces). The technologies that became widespread after 1910, such as electrification, internal combustion powered transportation and mass production, were capital saving. Total non-residential business fixed capital spending fell after 1910 due to the fall of investment in structures.

=== Industry, commerce and agriculture ===
Two of the most transformative technologies of the century were widely introduced during the early decades: electrification, powered by high pressure boilers and steam turbines and automobiles and trucks powered by the internal combustion engine.

Chain stores experienced rapid growth.

Standardization was urged by the Department of Commerce for consumer goods such as bedspreads and screws. A simplified standardization program was issued during World War I.

==== Electrification ====
Electrification was one of the most important drivers of economic growth in the early 20th century. The revolutionary design of electric powered factories caused the period of the highest productivity growth in manufacturing. There was large growth in the electric utility industry and the productivity growth of electric utilities was high as well.

At the turn of the 20th century electricity was used primarily for lighting and most electric companies did not provide daytime service. Electric motors that were used in daytime, such as the DC motors that powered street railways, helped balance the load, and many street railways generated their own electricity and also operated as electric utilities. The AC motor, developed in the 1890s, was ideal for industrial and commercial power and greatly increased the demand for electricity, particular during daytime.

Electrification in the U.S. started in industry around 1900, and by 1930 about 80% of power used in industry was electric. Electric utilities with central generating stations using steam turbines greatly lowered the cost of power, with businesses and houses in cities becoming electrified. In 1900 only 3% of households had electricity, increasing to 30% by 1930. By 1940 almost all urban households had electricity. Electrical appliances such as irons, cooking appliances and washing machines were slowly adopted by households. Household mechanical refrigerators were introduced in 1919 but were in only about 8% of households by 1930, mainly because of their high cost.

The electrical power industry had high productivity growth. A number of large central power stations, equipped with high pressure boilers and steam turbine generators began being built after 1913. These central stations were designed for efficient handling of coal from the layout of the rail yards to the conveyor systems. They were also much more fuel efficient, lowering the amount of fuel per kilowatt-hour of electricity to a small fraction of what it had been. In 1900 it took 7 lbs coal to generate one kilowatt hour. In 1960 it took 0.9 lb/kw hr.

==== Manufacturing ====
Rapid economic growth in the early decades of the 20th century were largely due to productivity growth in manufacturing.

Factory electrification revolutionized manufacturing. Unit drive, which means using a single electric motor for powering a single machine, eliminated line shafts previously used to transmit power from a small number of steam engines or hydraulic turbines. Line shafts created constraints on building arrangement that impeded the efficient flow of materials because they presented traffic barriers and required multi-story buildings for economy. It was not uncommon for large manufacturing sites to have many miles of line shafts. Electric motors were much more economical to operate than steam engines in terms of energy efficiency and operator attention. Electric motors were also lower in capital cost.

Frederick W. Taylor was the best known pioneer in the field of scientific management in the late 19th century, carefully timing and plotting the functions of various workers and then devising new, more efficient ways for them to do their jobs. Ford Motor Co. used techniques of scientific management although Henry Ford claimed not to know of Taylor's system. Ford Motor used every practical means to reduce the effort and movement of workers in order to reduce the time involved in making parts, moving parts and assembling parts into automobiles. Ford used electric powered factories and in 1913 Ford introduced the assembly line, a step in the process that became known as mass production. The price of a Ford Model T fell from $900 in 1908–9 to $360 in 1916, despite the fact that wages doubled to $5 per day in 1914. Production grew from 13,840 in 1909 to 132,702 in 1916. Productivity for this period, measured in output of Model T's per worker, rose 150%.

Ford offered a generous wage—$5 a day—to his workers, arguing that a mass production enterprise could not survive if average workers could not buy the goods. However, Ford expanded the company's Sociological Department to monitor his workers and ensure that they did not spend their newfound bounty on "vice and cheap thrills".

==== Electric street railways ====
Electric street railways developed into a major mode of transportation, and electric inter-urban service connected cities in the Northeast and Midwest. Electric street railways also carried freight, which was important before trucks became widely introduced. The widespread adoption of the automobile and motor bus halted the expansion of the electric street railways during the 1920s.

==== Railroads ====
At the beginning of the 20th century, the railroad network had over-expanded with many miles of unprofitable routes. In 1906 Congress gave the Interstate Commerce Commission the power to regulate freight rates and the industry was unable to increase revenue enough to cover rising costs. By 1916, the peak year of track mileage, one-sixth of the nation's railroad trackage was in bankruptcy.

The railroads proved inadequate to handle the increased freight volume created by World War I. There were major traffic jams in the system and critical supplies were experiencing delays. In December 1917 the railroads were taken over by the government and put under control of the United States Railroad Administration (USRA). The USRA ordered 1,930 new standardized steam locomotives and over 100,000 railcars. The USRA's control over the railroads ended in March 1920.

==== Automobiles and trucks ====
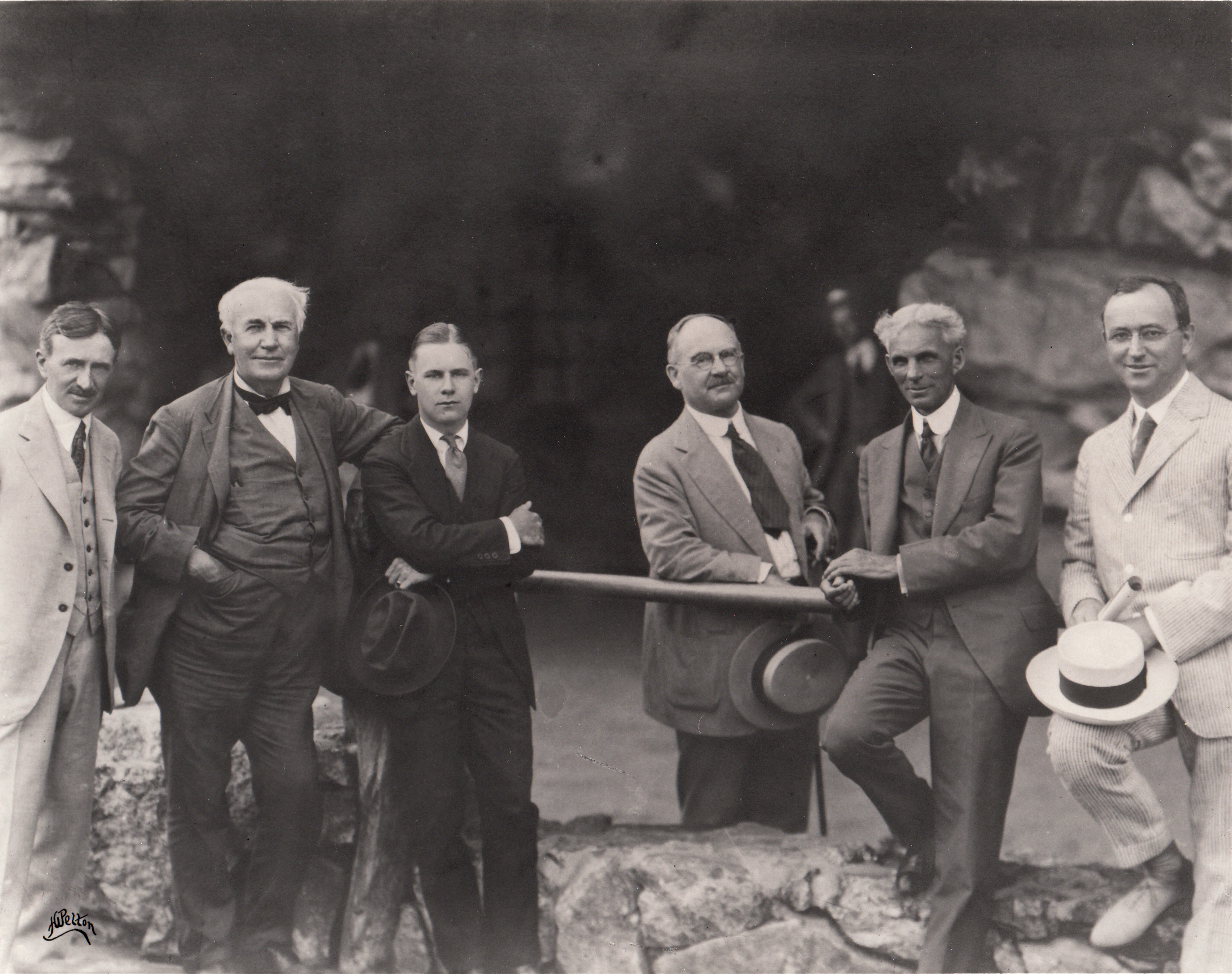
Harvey Firestone, Thomas Edison, Henry Ford, and Fred Seely in Asheville, North Carolina, 1918

By the dawn of the 20th century, automobiles had begun to replace horse-drawn carriages. A number of companies were building cars, but car manufacturing was challenging. Consequently, prices were high and production was low. Mass production techniques of the mid-1910s brought down the cost of automobiles and sales grew dramatically. By 1919 automobile registrations were 6.6 million and truck registrations were 898,000.

Replacing horses with cars and trucks eliminated enormous quantities of horse manure and urine from city streets, greatly reducing the labor for street cleaning and also improving sanitation and living conditions. Reducing the number of horses for transportation freed up between one- sixth and one-quarter of all farm land.

==== Highway system ====
In 1900 there were only 200 miles of paved roads outside of cities in the U.S. By the late 1920s automobiles were becoming common, but there were few highways connecting cities. The Federal road building program ended in 1818, leaving states to build roads until the Federal Road act of 1916. A national highway system was agreed on in 1926, when an interstate program (not to be confused with the Dwight D. Eisenhower National System of Interstate and Defense Highways) began, there were 23.1 million cars and 3.5 million trucks. The system was nearly complete when the U. S. entered World War II in December 1941.

==== Water supply and sewers ====
At the turn of the century approximately one-third of urban households had running water; however, most of it was untreated and carried disease causing microorganisms. The widespread building of water treatment plants and piping of water to and sewage from urban households occurred in the early decades of the century. The number of urban households supplied with running filtered water increased from 6.3% in 1900 to 25% in 1910 and 42% in 1925. In 1908 the Jersey City Water Works in New Jersey was the first to sterilize water using sodium hypochlorite (chlorine bleach). Chlorination of drinking water became common in urban water supplies by the 1930s and contributed to a sharp reduction in diseases such as hepatitis A, typhoid fever, cholera and dysentery.

==== Agriculture ====
Internal combustion powered tractors appeared on farms in the mid-1910s and farmers began using automobiles and trucks to haul produce. By 1924 tractors and trucks on farms numbered 450,000 and 370,000 respectively. Combined harvester-threshers reduced labor cost 85% compared to using binders and stationary threshers. Farms have decreased in the United States. The number of farms in the U.S. have decreased from 7 million in the 1930s to just a little over 2 million in 2000. The rate of decline was most rapid in the 1950s and 1960s. The reason for this was because of the increased innovation in farms where new technology was able to create more product which resulted in the need for fewer farms. Also during the 1950s–1960s people moved from the bigger cities and farms to more suburban areas so these smaller farms would be sold and people would move closer to cities. People also could not afford the new technologies to help them farm so bigger farms would be successful during this time, while smaller farms would close.

==== Finance, money and banking ====
A major economic downturn in 1906 ended the expansion from the late 1890s. This was followed by the Panic of 1907. The Panic of 1907 was a factor in the establishment of the Federal Reserve Bank in 1913.

The mild inflation of the 1890s, attributed to the rising gold supply from mining, continued until World War I, at which time inflation rose sharply with wartime shortages including labor shortages. Following the war the rate of inflation fell, but prices remained above the prewar level.

The U.S. economy prospered during World War I, partly due to sales of war goods to Europe. The stock market had its best year in history in 1916. The U.S. gold reserves doubled between 1913 and 1918, causing the price level to rise. Interest rates had been held low to minimize interest on war bonds, but after the final war bonds were sold in 1919, the Federal Reserve raised the discount rate from 4% to 6%. Interest rates rose and the money supply contracted. The economy entered the Depression of 1920–21, which was a sharp decline financially. By 1923, the economy had returned to full employment.

A debt-fueled boom developed following the war. Jerome (1934) gives an unattributed quote about finance conditions that allowed the great industrial expansion of the post World War I period:

Probably never before in this country had such a volume of funds been available at such low rates for such a long period.

There was also a real estate and housing bubble in the 1920s, especially in Florida, which burst in 1925. Alvin Hansen stated that housing construction during the 1920s decade exceeded population growth by 25%. See also:Florida land boom of the 1920s

Debt reached unsustainable levels. Speculation in stocks drove prices up to unprecedented valuation levels. The stock market crashed in late October 1929.

=== Politics and regulation ===
Systematic regulation of major sectors of the economy and society was a priority of the federal government in this era. In the 19th century the federal government was not heavily involved in the private sector, except in the areas of land sales and transportation. In general, the concept of laissez-faire prevailes. It was a doctrine opposing government interference in the economy except to maintain law and order. This attitude started to change during the latter part of the 19th century, when small business, farm, and labor movements began asking the government to intercede on their behalf.

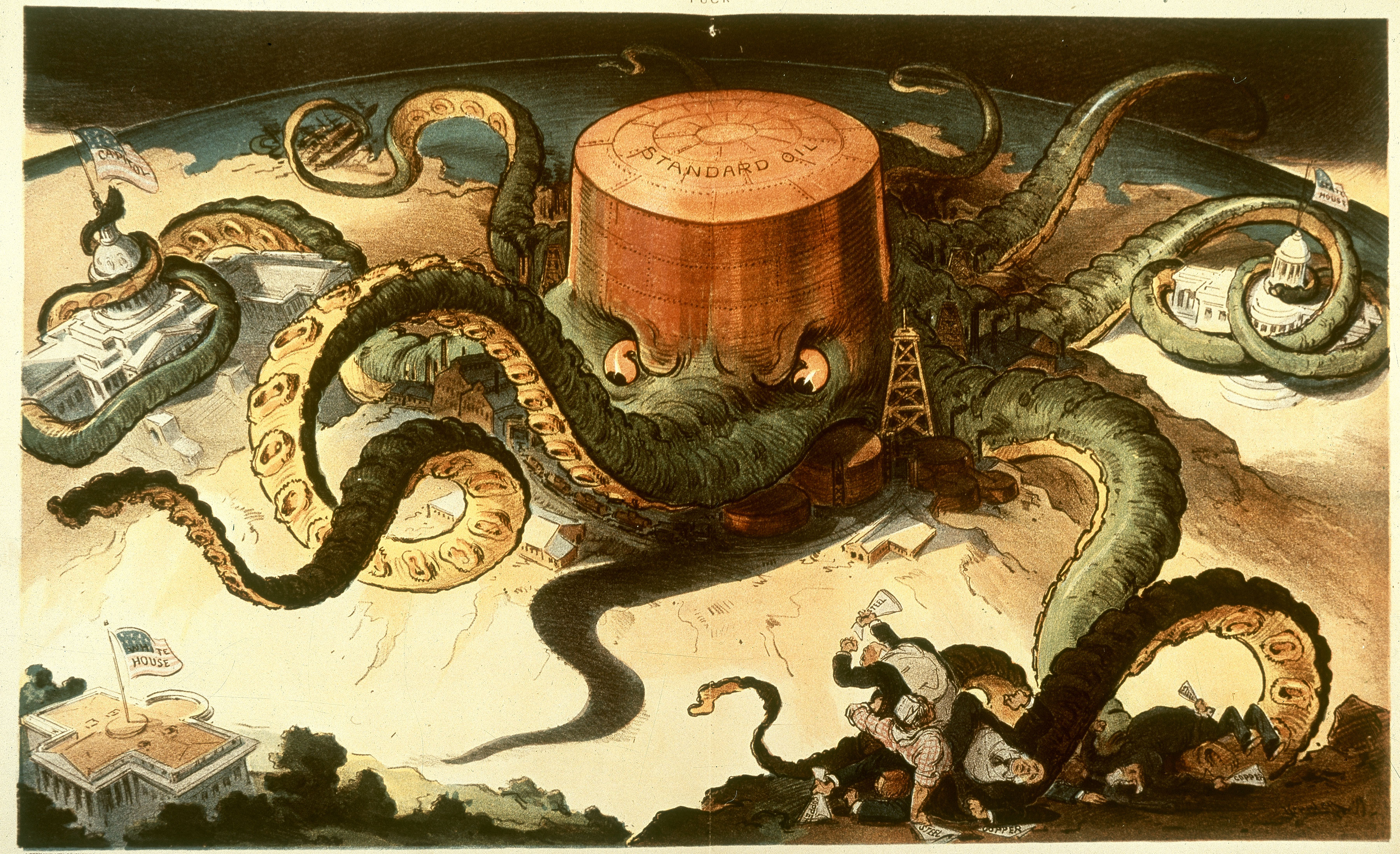
Fear of monopolies ("trusts") is shown in this attack on Rockefeller's Standard Oil Company.

By 1900, a middle class had developed that was leery of both the business elite and the somewhat radical political movements of farmers and laborers in the Midwest and West. Known as Progressives, these people favored government regulation of business practices to, in their minds, ensure competition and free enterprise. Congress enacted a law regulating railroads in 1887 (the Interstate Commerce Act), and one preventing large firms from controlling a single industry in 1890 (the Sherman Antitrust Act). These laws were not rigorously enforced, however, until the years between 1900 and 1920, when Republican President Theodore Roosevelt (1901–1909), Democrat President Woodrow Wilson (1913–1921), and others sympathetic to the views of the Progressives came to power. Many of today's U.S. regulatory agencies were created during these years, including the Interstate Commerce Commission and the Federal Trade Commission. Ida M. Tarbell wrote a series of articles against the Standard Oil monopoly. The series helped pave the way for the breakup of the monopoly.

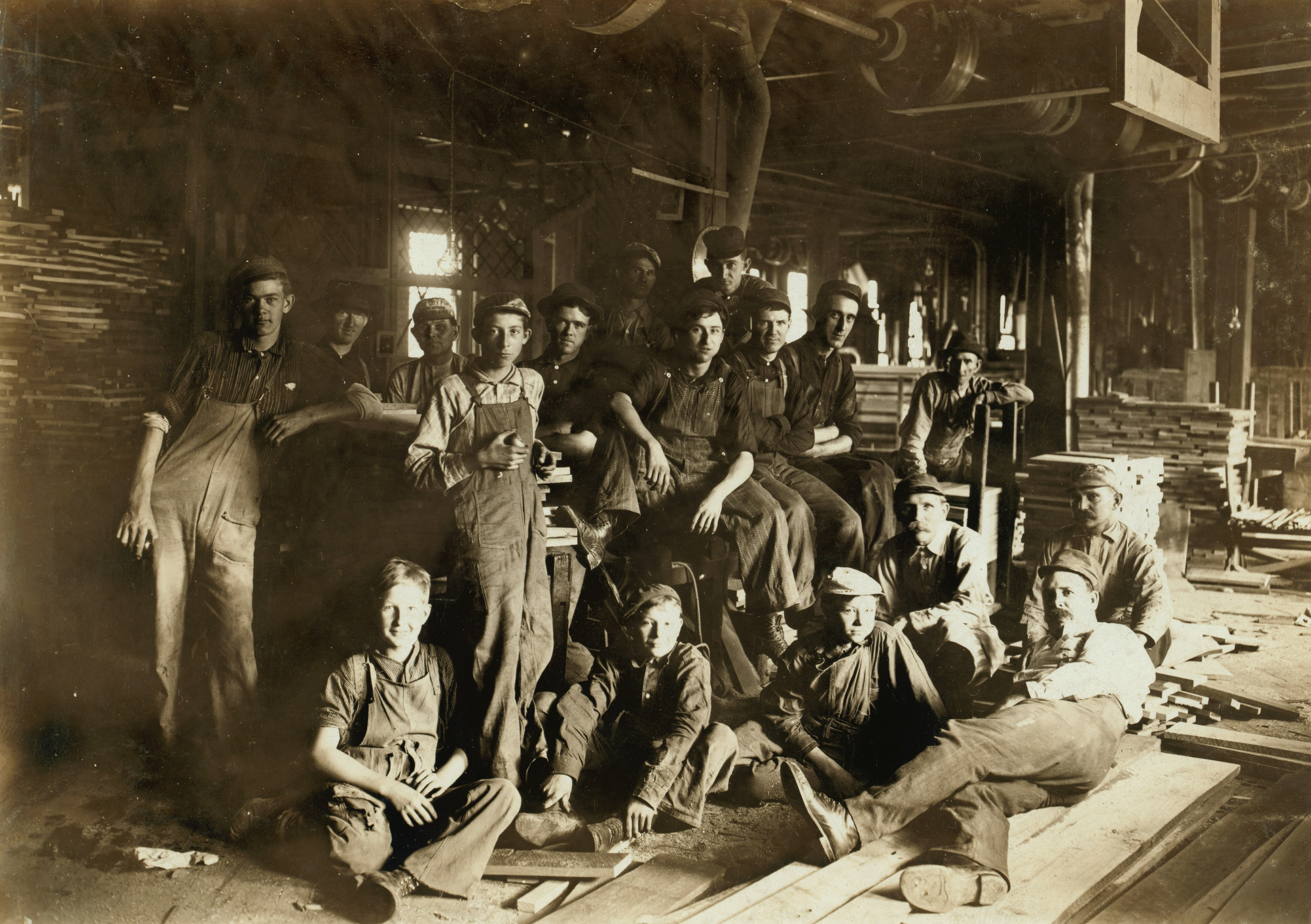
Noon hour in a furniture factory. Indianapolis, Indiana, 1908

Muckrakers were journalists who encouraged readers to demand more regulation of business. Upton Sinclair's The Jungle (1906) showed America the horrors of the Chicago Union Stock Yards, a giant complex of meat processing that developed in the 1870s. The federal government responded to Sinclair's book with the new regulatory Food and Drug Administration.

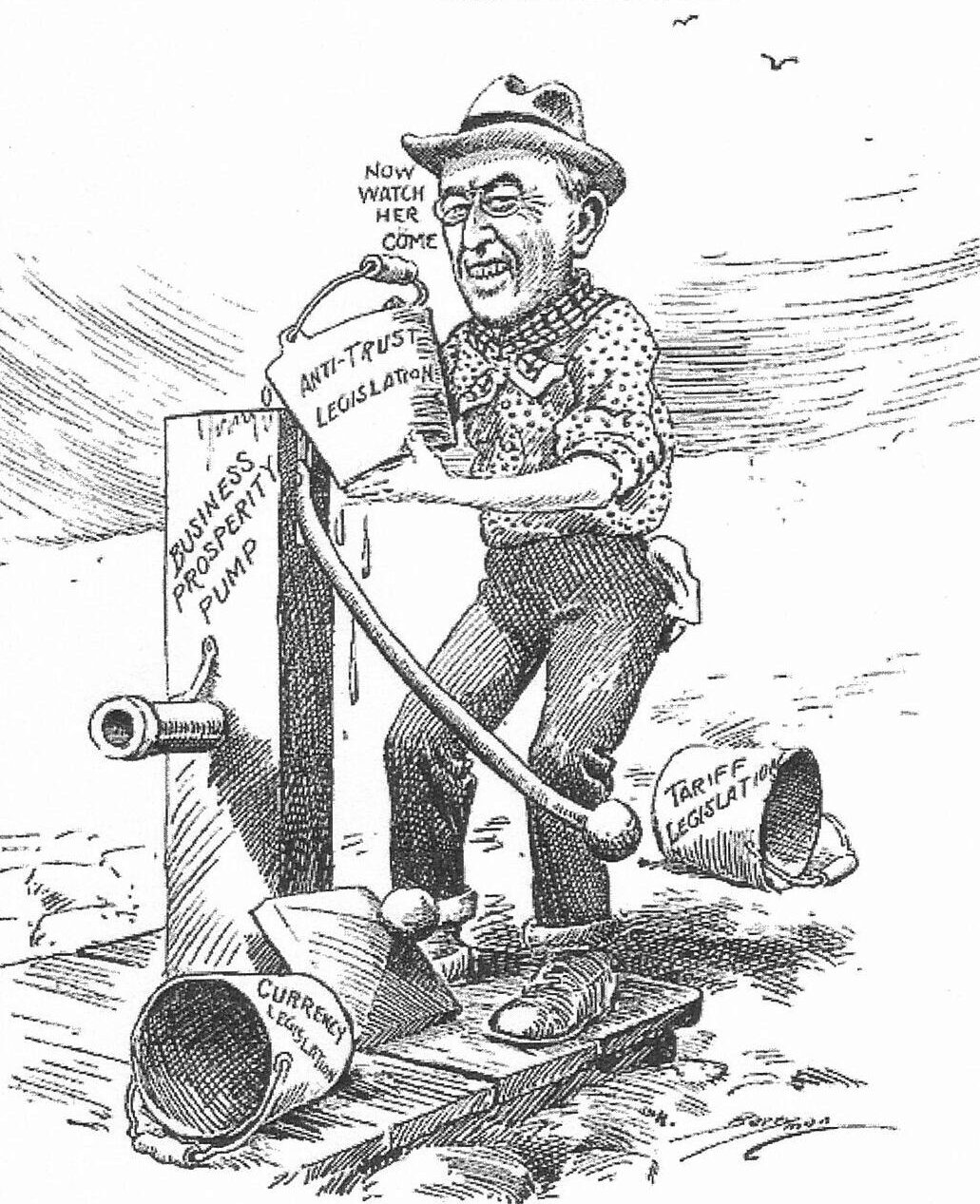
President Wilson in 1913 using tariff, currency, and anti-trust laws to "prime the pump" and get the economy working

When Democrat Woodrow Wilson was elected president with a Democrat controlled Congress in 1912 he implemented a series of progressive policies. In 1913, the Sixteenth Amendment was ratified, and the income tax was instituted in the United States. Wilson resolved the longstanding debates over tariffs and antitrust, and created the Federal Reserve, a complex business-government partnership that to this day dominates the financial world.

The Pure Food and Drug Act of 1906 was the first of a series of legislation that led to the establishment of the Food and Drug Administration (FDA). Another such act passed the same year was the Federal Meat Inspection Act. The new laws helped the large packers, and hurt small operations that lacked economy of scale or quality controls.

The Sixteenth Amendment to the United States Constitution, which allowed the Federal Government to tax all income, was adopted in 1913. Starting small, the tax shot up in 1917 to pay for the war, then declined in the 1920s.

The Emergency Quota Act (1921) established a quota system on immigrants by country of origin, with the maximum number of annual immigrants from a country limited to 3% of the number of that national background living in the U.S. according to the 1910 United States Census. The Immigration Act of 1924 reduced the quota from 3% to 2% and added additional restrictions on certain nationalities.

==== World War I ====
The World War involved a massive mobilization of money, taxes, and banking resources to pay for the American war effort and, through government-to-government loans, most of the Allied war effort as well.

==== Roaring Twenties: 1920–1929 ====
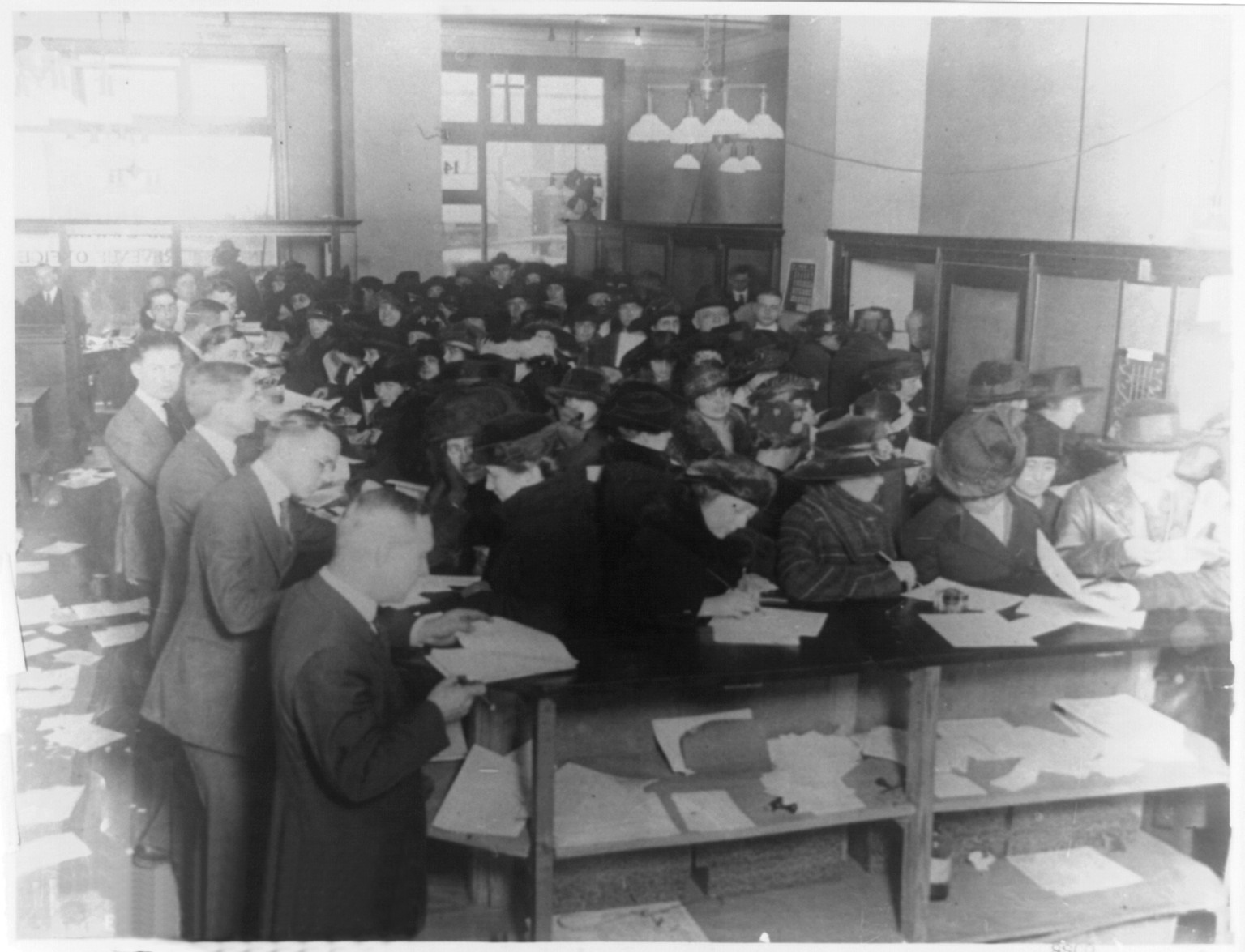
People filing tax forms in 1920

Under Republican President Warren G. Harding, who called for normalcy and an end to high wartime taxes, Secretary of the Treasury Andrew Mellon raised the tariff, cut marginal tax rates and used the large surplus to reduce the federal debt by about a third from 1920 to 1930. Secretary of Commerce Herbert Hoover worked to introduce efficiency, by regulating business practices. This period of prosperity, along with the culture of the time, was known as the Roaring Twenties. The rapid growth of the automobile industry stimulated industries such as oil, glass, and road-building. Tourism soared and consumers with cars had a much wider radius for their shopping. Small cities prospered, and large cities had their best decade ever, with a boom in construction of offices, factories and homes. The new electric power industry transformed both business and everyday life. Telephones and electricity spread to the countryside, but farmers never recovered from the wartime bubble in land prices. Millions migrated to nearby cities. However, in October 1929, the Stock market crashed and banks began to fail in the Wall Street Crash of 1929.

=== Quality of life ===
The early decades of the 20th century were remarkable for the improvements of the quality of life in the U.S. The quality of housing improved, with houses offering better protection against cold. Floor space per occupant increased. Sanitation was greatly improved by the building of water supply and sewage systems, plus the treatment of drinking water by filtration and chlorination. The change over to internal combustion took horses off the streets and eliminated horse manure and urine and the flies they attracted. Federal regulation of food products and processing, including government inspection of meat processing plants helped lower the incidence of food related illness and death.

Infant mortality, which had been declining dramatically in the last quarter of the 19th century, continued to decline.

The workweek, which averaged 53 hours in 1900, continued to decline. The burden of household chores lessened considerably. Hauling water and firewood into the home every day was no longer necessary for an increasing number of households.

Electric light was far less expensive and higher quality than kerosene lamp light. Electric light also eliminated smoke and fumes and reduced the fire hazard.

=== Welfare capitalism ===
Beginning in the 1880s but especially by the 1920s, some large non-union corporations such as Kodak, Sears, and IBM, adopted the philosophy of paternalistic welfare capitalism. In this system, workers are considered an important stakeholder alongside owners and customers. In return for loyalty to the company, workers get long-term job security, health care, defined benefit pension plans, and other perks. Welfare capitalism was seen as good for society, but also for the economic interests of the company as a way to prevent unionization, government regulation, and socialism or Communism, which became a major concern in the 1910s.

== Great Depression and World War II: 1929–1945 ==
=== Pre-war industry, commerce, and agriculture ===
Despite the Great Depression and World War II, the middle decades of the 20th century were among the highest for productivity growth. The research developed through informal cooperation between U.S. industry and academia grew rapidly and by the late 1930s exceeded the size of that taking place in Britain (although the quality of U.S. research was not yet on par with British and German research at the time).

==== Manufacturing ====
Productivity growth in manufacturing slowed from the electrification era of the early century, but remained moderate. Automation of factories became widespread during the middle decades as industry invested in newly developed instruments and controls that allowed fewer workers to operate vast factories, refineries and chemical plants.

=== Great Depression: 1929–1941 ===
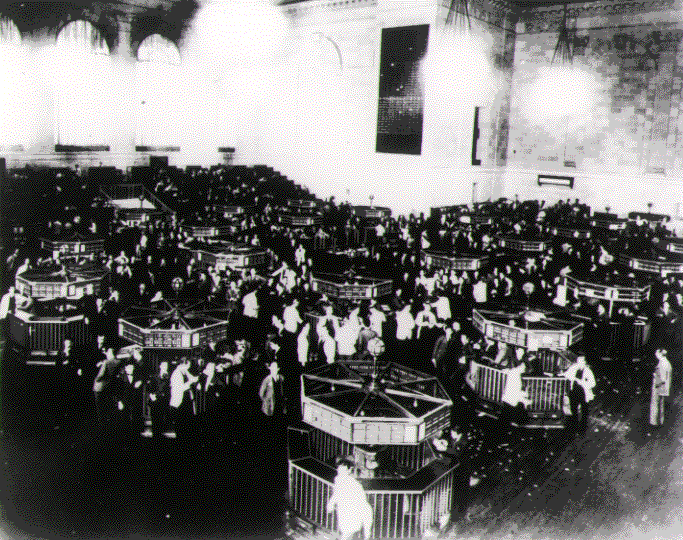
Stock exchange trading floor after the 1929 crash

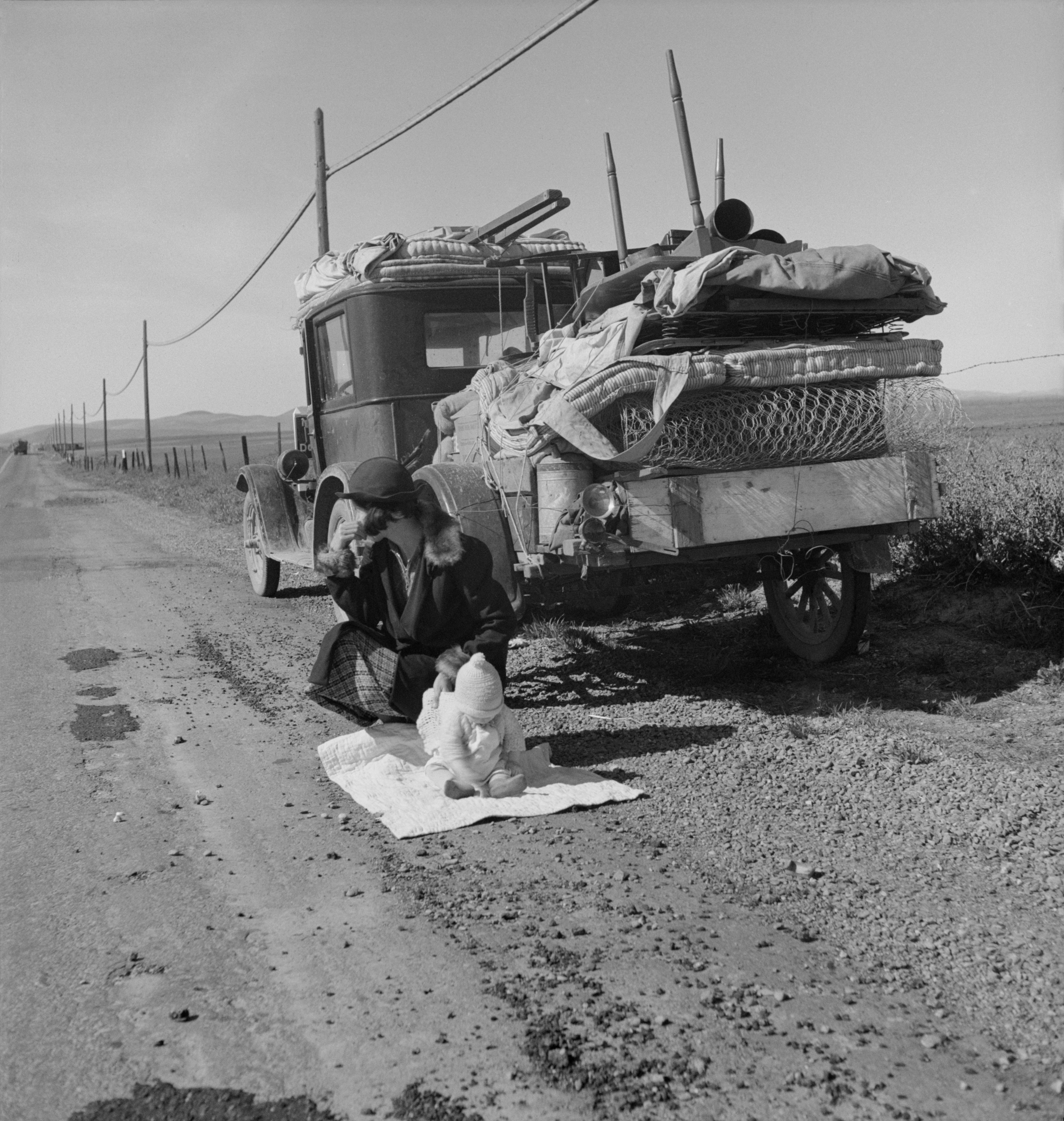
"Broke, baby sick, and car trouble!" Dorothea Lange's 1937 photo of Missouri migrants living in a truck in California. Displaced people moved to California to look for work during the Depression. John Steinbeck depicted the situation in The Grapes of Wrath.

Following the Wall Street Crash of 1929, the worldwide economy plunged into the Great Depression. The U.S. money supply began to contract by one-third. The protectionist Smoot–Hawley Tariff Act incited retaliation from Canada, Britain, Germany and other trading partners. Congress, in 1932, worried about the rapidly growing deficit and national debt, and raised income tax rates. Economists generally agree that these measures deepened an already serious crisis. By 1932, the unemployment rate was 25%. Conditions were worse in heavy industry, lumbering, export agriculture (cotton, wheat, tobacco), and mining. Conditions were not quite as bad in white collar sectors and in light manufacturing.

Franklin Delano Roosevelt was elected President in 1932 without a specific program. He relied on a highly eclectic group of advisors who patched together a number of programs, known as the New Deal.

Table 2: Depression Data	1929	1931	1933	1937	1938	1940
Real Gross National Product (GNP) (Note: In 1929 dollars)	101.4	84.3	68.3	103.9	103.7	113.0
Consumer Price Index (Note: 1935–39 = 100)	122.5	108.7	92.4	102.7	99.4	100.2
Index of Industrial Production	109	75	69	112	89	126
Money Supply M2 ($ billions)	46.6	42.7	32.2	45.7	49.3	55.2
Exports ($ billions)	5.24	2.42	1.67	3.35	3.18	4.02
Unemployment (% of civilian workforce)	3.1	16.1	25.2	13.8	16.5	13.9

==== Spending ====
Government spending increased from 8.0% of GNP under Herbert Hoover in 1932 to 10.2% of GNP in 1936. Franklin D. Roosevelt balanced the "regular" budget the emergency budget was funded by debt, which increased from 33.6% of GNP in 1932 to 40.9% in 1936. Deficit spending had been recommended by some economists, most notably the Briton John Maynard Keynes. Roosevelt met Keynes but did not pay attention to his recommendations. After a meeting with Keynes, who kept drawing diagrams, Roosevelt remarked that "He must be a mathematician rather than a political economist". John Keynes' approach to the Great Depression could have been a solution. His method was to keep the feds spending as much as they could even on random purchases but the money had to keep moving. It is believed that if America went through with John Keynes plan the Great Depression could have been avoided entirely. The Feds started to spend more when President Roosevelt came into office as the federal government doubled income tax rates in 1932. Total government tax revenues as a percentage of GDP shot up from 10.8% in 1929 to 16.6% in 1933. Higher tax rates tended to reduce consumption and aggregate demand. Spending would go up and America would get out of the great depression when World War II happened after Japan's attack on American forces in Pearl Harbor in December 1941 led to much sharper increases in government purchases, and the economy pushed quickly into an inflationary gap.

==== Banking crisis ====
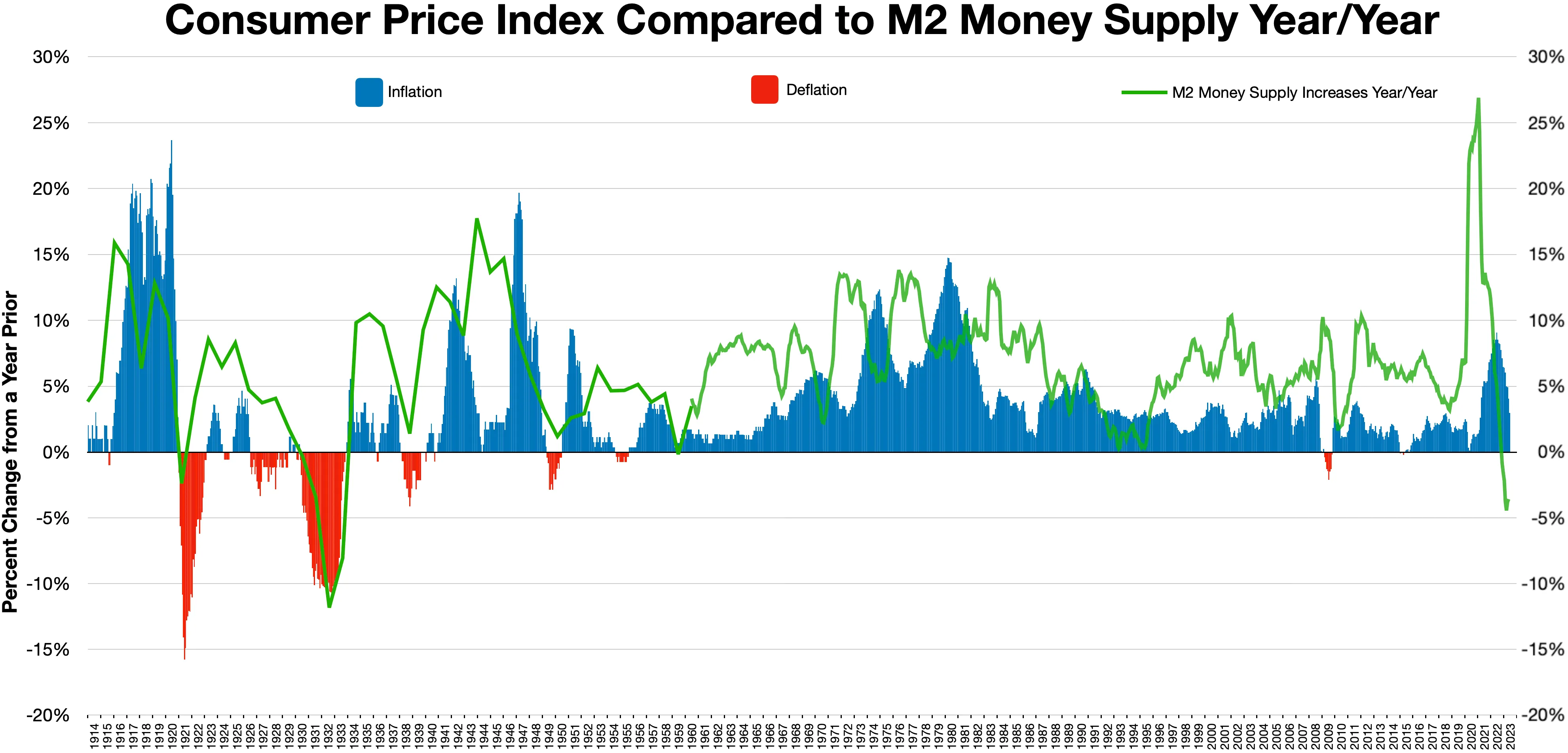
Inflation Deflation M2 money supply increases Year/Year

In 1929–33 the economy was destabilized by bank failures. The initial reasons were substantial losses in investment banking, followed by bank runs. Bank runs occurred when a large number of customers lost confidence in their deposits (which were not insured) and rushed to withdraw their deposits. Runs destabilized a number of banks to the point where they faced bankruptcy. Between 1929 and 1933 40% of all banks (9,490 out of 23,697 banks) went bankrupt. Much of the Great Depression's economic damage was caused directly by bank runs.

Hoover had already considered a bank holiday to prevent further bank runs, but rejected the idea because he was afraid to trip a panic. Roosevelt acted as soon as he took office; he closed all the banks in the country and kept them all closed until he could pass new legislation. On March 9, Roosevelt sent to Congress the Emergency Banking Act, drafted in large part by Hoover's top advisors. The act was passed and signed into law the same day. It provided for a system of reopening sound banks under Treasury supervision, with federal loans available if needed. Three-quarters of the banks in the Federal Reserve System reopened within the next three days. Billions of dollars in hoarded currency and gold flowed back into them within a month, thus stabilizing the banking system. By the end of 1933, 4,004 small local banks were permanently closed and merged into larger banks. Their deposits totaled $3.6 billion; depositors lost a total of $540 million, and eventually received on average 85 cents on the dollar of their deposits; it is a common myth that they received nothing back. The Glass–Steagall Act limited commercial bank securities activities and affiliations between commercial banks and securities firms to regulate speculations. It also established the Federal Deposit Insurance Corporation (FDIC), which insured deposits for up to $250,000, ending the risk of runs on banks.

==== Unemployment ====
Unemployment reached 25 percent in the worst days of 1932–33, but it was unevenly distributed. Job losses were less severe among women than men, among workers in nondurable industries (such as food and clothing), in services and sales, and in government jobs. The least skilled inner city men had much higher unemployment rates, as did young people who had a hard time getting their first job, and men over the age of 45 who if they lost their job would seldom find another one because employers had their choice of younger men. Millions were hired in the Great Depression, but men with weaker credentials were never hired, and fell into a long-term unemployment trap. The migration that brought millions of farmers and townspeople to the bigger cities in the 1920s suddenly reversed itself, as unemployment made the cities unattractive, and the network of kinfolk and more ample food supplies made it wise for many to go back.

City governments in 1930–31 tried to meet the depression by expanding public works projects, as president Herbert Hoover strongly encouraged. However tax revenues were plunging, and the cities as well as private relief agencies were totally overwhelmed by 1931 men were unable to provide significant additional relief. They fell back on the cheapest possible relief, soup kitchens which provided free meals for anyone who showed up. After 1933 new sales taxes and infusions of federal money helped relieve the fiscal distress of the cities, but the budgets did not fully recover until 1941.

The federal programs launched by Hoover and greatly expanded by president Roosevelt's New Deal used massive construction projects to try to jump start the economy and solve the unemployment crisis. The alphabet agencies ERA, CCC, FERA, WPA and PWA built and repaired the public infrastructure in dramatic fashion, but did little to foster the recovery of the private sector. FERA, CCC, and especially WPA focused on providing unskilled jobs for long-term unemployed men.

==== Relief ====
The extent to which the spending for relief and public works provided a sufficient stimulus to revive the U.S. economy, or whether it harmed the economy, is also debated. If one defines economic health entirely by the gross domestic product, the U.S. had gotten back on track by 1934, and made a full recovery by 1936, but as Roosevelt said, one third of the nation was ill fed, ill-housed and ill-clothed. See Chart 3. GNP was 34% higher in 1936 than 1932, and 58% higher in 1940 on the eve of war. The economy grew 58% from 1932 to 1940 in 8 years of peacetime, and then grew another 56% from 1940 to 1945 in 5 years of wartime. The unemployment rate fell from 25.2% in 1932 to 13.9% in 1940 when the draft started. During the war the economy operated under so many different conditions that comparison is impossible with peacetime, such as massive spending, price controls, bond campaigns, controls over raw materials, prohibitions on new housing and new automobiles, rationing, guaranteed cost-plus profits, subsidized wages, and the draft of 12 million soldiers.

Chart 3: GDP annual pattern and long-term trend, 1920–40, in billions of constant dollars

In 1995 economist Robert Whaples stated that measuring the effect of the New Deal remains a thorny issue for economists because it is so difficult to measure the effects it had on the country. A survey of academic specialists by Whaples showed that in regards to the statement "The New Deal lengthened and deepened the Great Depression", 27% generally agreed, 22% agreed but with provisos, and 51% disagreed. Among professional historians, 6% agreed, 21% agreed with provisos, and 74% disagreed. However, economist Eric Rauchway of the University of California stated "very few people disapprove of most of the New Deal reforms", which include Social Security, the Securities and Exchange Commission, the Federal Deposit Insurance Corp., and Fannie Mae. Regardless, unemployment peaked in 1932 at 25% and was reduced to 13.9% by 1940.

As Broadus Mitchell summarized, "Most indexes worsened until the summer of 1932, which may be called the low point of the depression economically and psychologically". Economic indicators show the American economy declined until February 1933. After Roosevelt took office, there began a steady, sharp upward recovery that persisted until the brief Recession of 1937–1938 (see graph) after which they continued their upward climb. Thus the Federal Reserve Index of Industrial Production bottomed at 52.8 on July 1, 1932, and was practically unchanged at 54.3 on March 1, 1933; however by July 1, 1933, it had climbed to 85.5 (with 1935–39 = 100, and for comparison 2005 = 1,342).

==== New Deal impact ====
A 2017 review of the published scholarship summarized the findings of researchers as follows:

The studies find that public works and relief spending had state income multipliers of around one, increased consumption activity, attracted internal migration, reduced crime rates, and lowered several types of mortality. The farm programs typically aided large farm owners but eliminated opportunities for share croppers, tenants, and farm workers. The Home Owners' Loan Corporation's purchases and refinancing of troubled mortgages staved off drops in housing prices and home ownership rates at relatively low ex post cost to taxpayers. The Reconstruction Finance Corporation's loans to banks and railroads appear to have had little positive impact, although the banks were aided when the RFC took ownership stakes.

=== Wartime output and controls: 1940–1945 ===
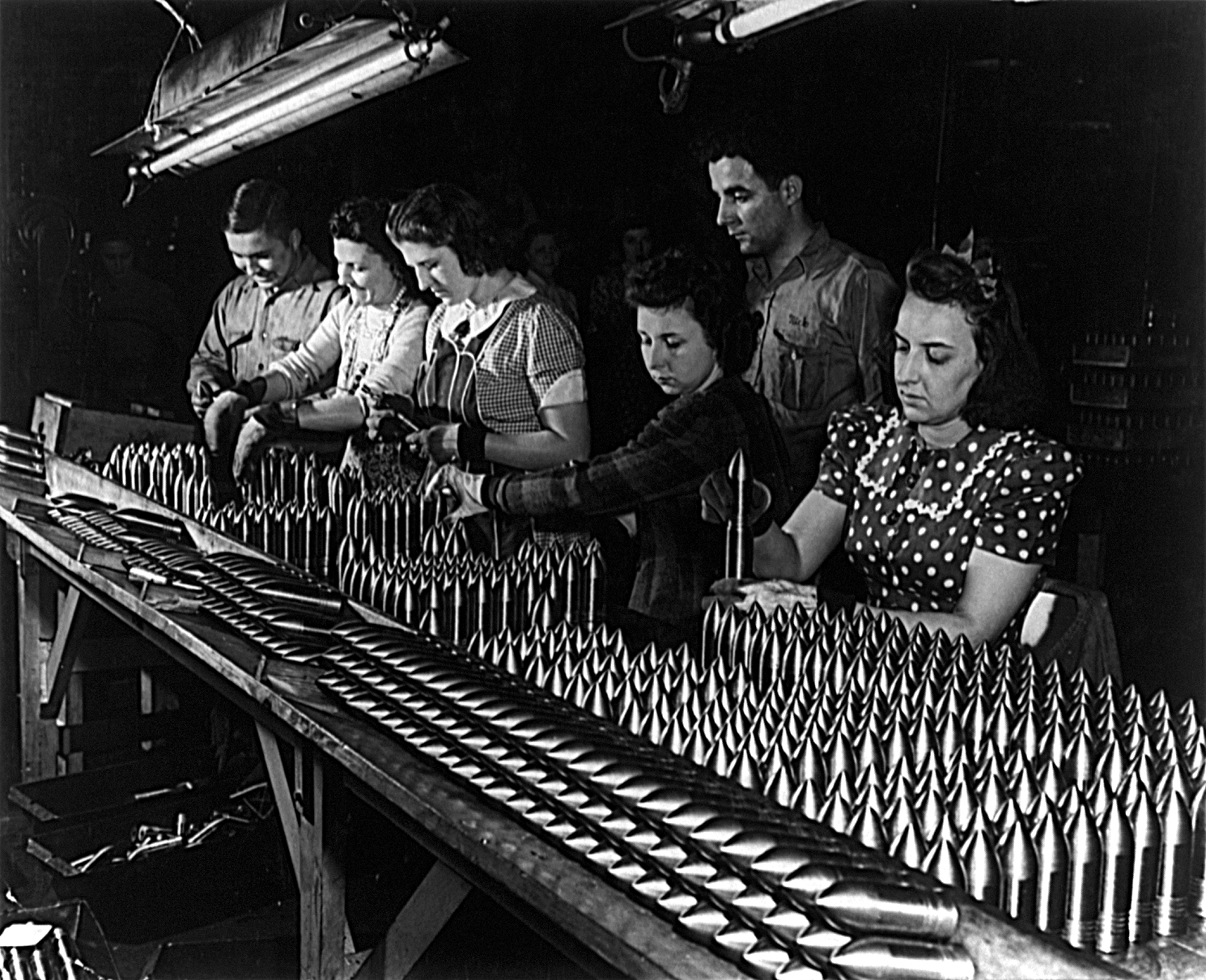
Women making aluminum shells for the war in 1942

Unemployment dropped to 2%, relief programs largely ended, and the industrial economy grew rapidly to new heights as millions of people moved to new jobs in war centers, and 16 million men and 300,000 women were drafted or volunteered for military service. (Note: Of the 16 million men, 10 million were drafted. Women were never drafted.)

All economic sectors grew during the war. Farm output went from an index (by volume) of 106 in 1939 to 128 in 1943. Coal output went from 446 million tons in 1939 to 651 in 1943; oil from 1.3 billion barrels to 1.5 billion. Manufacturing output doubled, from a volume index of 109 in 1939 to 239 in 1943. Railroads strained to move it all to market, going from an output of 13.6 billion loaded car miles in 1939 to 23.3 in 1943.

The War Production Board coordinated the nation's productive capabilities so that military priorities would be met. Converted consumer-products plants filled many military orders. Automakers built tanks and aircraft, for example, making the United States the "arsenal of democracy". In an effort to prevent rising national income and scarce consumer products from causing inflation, the newly created Office of Price Administration rationed and set prices for consumer items ranging from sugar to meat, clothing and gasoline, and otherwise tried to restrain price increases. It also set rent in war centers.

Six million women took jobs in manufacturing and production; most were newly created temporary jobs in munitions. Some were replacing men away in the military. These working women were symbolized by the fictional character of Rosie the Riveter. After the war many women returned to household work as men returned from military service. The nation turned to the suburbs, as a pent-up demand for new housing was finally unleashed.

=== Household gas, water, electricity, sanitation, heating, refrigeration ===
By 1940 nearly 100% of urban homes had electricity, 80% had indoor flush toilets, 73% had gas heating or cooking, 58% central heating, 56% had mechanical refrigerators.

== Post-World War II prosperity: 1945–1973 ==
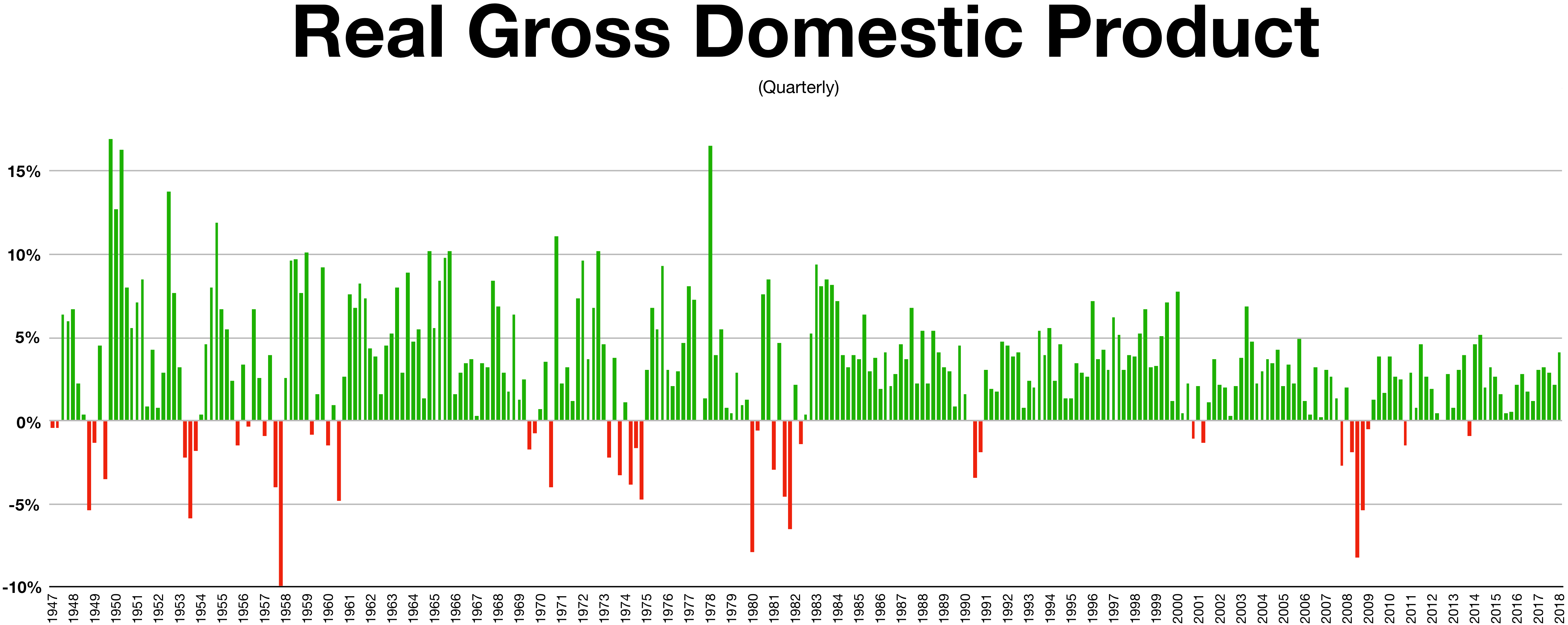
Quarterly gross domestic product

The period from the end of World War II to the early 1970s was a golden era of economic growth. $200 billion in war bonds matured, and the G.I. Bill financed a well-educated workforce. The middle class swelled, as did GDP and productivity. This growth was distributed fairly evenly across the economic classes though not race, which some attribute to the strength of labor unions in this period—labor union membership peaked historically in the U.S. during the 1950s, in the midst of this massive economic growth. Much of the growth came from the movement of low income farm workers into better paying jobs in the towns and cities—a process largely completed by 1960.

Congress created the Council of Economic Advisors, to promote high employment, high profits and low inflation. The Eisenhower administration (1953–1961) supported an activist contracyclical approach that helped to establish Keynesianism as a bipartisan economic policy for the nation. Especially important in formulating the CEA response to the recession—accelerating public works programs, easing credit, and reducing taxes—were Arthur F. Burns and Neil H. Jacoby. "I am now a Keynesian in economics", proclaimed Republican President Richard Nixon in 1969. Although this period brought economic expansion to the country as a whole, it was not recession proof. The recessions of 1945, 1949, 1953, 1958, and 1960 saw a drastic decline in GDP.

The "Baby Boom" saw a dramatic increase in fertility in the period 1942–1957; it was caused by delayed marriages and childbearing during depression years, a surge in prosperity, a demand for suburban single-family homes (as opposed to inner city apartments) and new optimism about the future. The boom crested about 1957, then slowly declined.

=== Agriculture ===
==== Farm machinery, fertilizer and high yield seed varieties ====
Ammonia from plants built during World War II to make explosives became available for making fertilizers, leading to a permanent decline in real fertilizer prices. The early 1950s was the peak period for tractor sales in the U.S. as the few remaining horses and mules were phased out. The horsepower of farm machinery underwent a large expansion. A successful cotton picking machine was introduced in 1949. The machine could do the work of 50 men picking by hand.

Research on plant breeding produced varieties of grain crops that could produce high yields with heavy fertilizer input. This resulted in the Green revolution, beginning in the 1940s. By the century's end yields of corn (maize) rose by a factor of over four. Wheat and soybean yields also rose significantly.

==== Government policies ====
The New Deal era farm programs were continued into the 1940s and 1950s, with the goal of supporting the prices received by farmers. Typical programs involved farm loans, commodity subsidies, and price supports. The rapid decline in the farm population led to a smaller voice in Congress. So the well-organized Farm Bureau and other lobbyists, worked in the 1970s to appeal to urban Congressman through food stamp programs for the poor. By 2000, the food stamp program was the largest component of the farm bill. In 2010, the Tea Party movement brought in a number of Republicans committed to cutting all federal subsidies, including those in agriculture. Meanwhile, urban Democrats strongly opposed reductions, pointing to the severe hardships caused by the 2008–10 economic recession. The Agricultural Act of 2014 saw many rural Republican Congressman voting against the program despite its support from farmers; it passed with urban support.

=== Aircraft and air transportation industries ===
Air transport was a major beneficiary of the war. The United States was the leading producer of combat aircraft during World War II and had a large surplus of machine tools and manufacturing facilities for airplanes at the end of the war. There were also experienced airplane manufacturing and maintenance personnel. Additionally, radar had been developed just before the war.

The aircraft industry had the highest productivity growth of any major industry, growing by 8.9% per year in 1929–1966.

During World War II the United States hired hundreds of thousands of workers, put them all in 4 major factories and had a government budget of over $3 billion (equivalent to $4.4325000000×10^{10} in 2019). The B-29 project required the US Army Air Forces to have unprecedented organizational capabilities as this project included several major private contractors and labor unions. American aircraft production was the single largest sector of the war economy, costing $45 billion (almost a quarter of the $183 billion spent on war production), employing a staggering two million workers, and, most importantly, producing over 125,000 aircraft. Production of Selected U.S. Military Aircraft (1941–1945): Bombers-49,123 Fighters-63,933 Cargo-14,710 Total-127,766.

=== Housing ===
Very little housing had been built during the Great Depression and World War II, except for emergency quarters near war industries. Overcrowded and inadequate apartments was the common condition. Some suburbs had developed around large cities where there was rail transportation to the jobs downtown. However, the real growth in suburbia depended on the availability of automobiles, highways, and inexpensive housing. The population had grown, and the stock of family savings had accumulated the money for down payments, automobiles and appliances. The product was a great housing boom. Whereas an average of 316,000 new housing non-farm units had been constructed from the 1930s through 1945, there were 1,450,000 units built annually from 1946 through 1955.

The G.I. Bill of Rights guaranteed low cost loans for veterans, with low down payments, and low interest rates. With 16 million eligible veterans, the opportunity to buy a house was suddenly at hand. In 1947 alone, 540,000 veterans bought one; their average price was $7300. The construction industry kept prices low by standardization – for example standardizing sizes for kitchen cabinets, refrigerators and stoves, allowed for mass production of kitchen furnishings. Developers purchased empty land just outside the city, installed tract houses based on a handful of designs, and provided streets and utilities, or local public officials race to build schools. The most famous development was Levittown, in Long Island just east of New York City. It offered a new house for $1000 down, and $70 a month; it featured three bedrooms, fireplace, gas range and gas furnace, and a landscaped lot of 75 by 100 feet, all for a total price of $10,000. Veterans could get one with a much lower down payment.

=== Interstate highway system ===
Construction of the Interstate Highway System began in 1956 under President Eisenhower. In long-term perspective the interstate highway system was a remarkable success, that has done much to sustain Eisenhower's positive reputation. Although there have been objections to the negative impact of clearing neighborhoods in cities, the system has been well received. The railroad system for passengers and freight declined sharply, but the trucking expanded dramatically and the cost of shipping and travel fell sharply. Suburbanization became widespread, with the rapid growth of easily accessible, larger, cheaper housing than was available in the overcrowded central cities. Tourism dramatically expanded as well, creating a demand for more service stations, motels, restaurants and visitor attractions. There was much more long-distance movement to the Sunbelt for winter vacations, or for permanent relocation, with convenient access to visits to relatives back home. In rural areas, towns and small cities off the grid lost out as shoppers followed the interstate, and new factories were located near them.

=== Computer technology ===
Mainframe business computer systems were introduced in the 1950s following the manufacture of transistors. Mainframe computers were in widespread use by the 1960s. These computers handled a variety of accounting, billing and payroll applications.

One highly significant application was the Sabre airline reservations system, which first went into operation in 1960. With Sabre reservations could be placed remotely using teleprinters and all functions were done automatically, including ticket printing. This eliminated manually handling file cards.

=== Fiscal policy ===
Federal taxes on incomes, profits and payrolls had risen to high levels during World War II and had been cut back only slowly; the highest rates for individuals reached the 90% level. Congress cut tax rates in 1964. President Lyndon B. Johnson (1963–69) dreamed of creating a "Great Society", and began a number of new social programs to that end, such as Medicaid and Medicare. During the Korean War, the Economic Stabilization Agency supervised price controls.

=== Military and space spending ===
After the Cold War began in 1947, and especially after the Korean War began in 1950, the government adopted a strategy in NSC 68 military spending. Economists examined how much this "military Keynesianism" stimulated the economy.

President Eisenhower feared that excessive military spending would damage the economy, so he downsized the Army after Korea and shifted priorities to missiles and nuclear weapons (which were much less expensive than army divisions). He also promoted the Interstate Highway system as necessary for national defense, and made space exploration a priority. His successor John F. Kennedy made a crewed mission to the moon a national priority. Much of the new spending went to California and the West, a continuation of wartime spending.

An even greater impact came in the South, where it stimulated a modernization of the economy away from cotton towards manufacturing and high technology. For example, there were new, large technologically sophisticated installations at the Atomic Energy Commission's Savannah River Site in South Carolina; the Redstone Arsenal at Huntsville, Alabama; nuclear research facilities at Oak Ridge, Tennessee; and space facilities at Cape Canaveral, Florida, at the Lyndon B. Johnson Space Center in Houston, and at the John C. Stennis Space Center in Mississippi.

The Defense Department financed some of private industry's research and development throughout these decades, most notably ARPANET (which would become the Internet).

=== Decline of labor unions ===
The percentage of workers belonging to a union (or "density") in the United States peaked in 1954 at almost 35% and the total number of union members peaked in 1979 at an estimated 21.0 million. Union membership has continued to decline into the 2010s due to right-to-work laws adopted by a number of states, globalization undermining higher-wage firms, and increasing political opposition exemplified by the breaking of the 1981 strike of the Professional Air Traffic Controllers Organization (1968) by President Ronald Reagan.

== Late 20th century ==
The US trade balance (from 1960)

Number of countries having a banking crisis in each year since 1800. This is based on This Time is Different: Eight Centuries of Financial Folly which covers only 70 countries. The general upward trend might be attributed to a number of factors. One of these is a gradual increase in the percent of people who receive money for their labor. The dramatic feature of this graph is the virtual absence of banking crises during the period of the Bretton Woods agreement, 1945 to 1971. This analysis is similar to Figure 10.1 in Reinhart and Rogoff (2009). For more details see the help file for "bankingCrises" in the Ecdat package available from the Comprehensive R Archive Network (CRAN).

=== Post industrial (service) economy ===
Manufacturing employment and nominal value added shares of the economy have been in a steady decline since World War II. In the late 1960s manufacturing's share of both employment and nominal value added was about 26%, falling to about 11% and 12% respectively by the end of the century.

Per-capita steel consumption in the U.S. peaked in 1977, then fell by half before staging a modest recovery to levels well below the peak.

=== Service sector expansion ===
The decline in the relative size of manufacturing coincided with a rise in the size of the service sector.

=== Productivity slowdown ===
Technological innovations of the final third of the 20th century were significant, but were not as powerful as those of the first two-thirds of the century. Manufacturing productivity growth continued at a somewhat slower rate than in earlier decades, but overall productivity was dragged down by the relative increase in size of the government and service sectors.

=== Inflation woes: 1970s ===
The postwar boom ended with a number of events in the early 1970s:

- the collapse of the Bretton Woods system in 1971
- the growing influx of imported manufacturing goods, such as automobiles and electronics
- the 1973 oil crisis,
- productivity growth fell to a low level after 1973 and remained low until the 1990s,
- the 1973–1974 stock market crash,
- and the ensuing displacement of Keynesian economics by monetarist economics, especially by the free-market Chicago School of Economics, led by economist Milton Friedman. At the same time, the consensus among experts moved against New-Deal-style regulation, in favor of deregulation.

In the late 1960s it was apparent to some that this juggernaut of economic growth was slowing down, and it began to become visibly apparent in the early 1970s. The United States grew increasingly dependent on oil importation from OPEC after peaking production in 1970, resulting in oil supply shocks in 1973 and 1979. Stagflation gripped the nation, and the government experimented with wage and price controls under President Nixon. The Bretton Woods Agreement collapsed in 1971–1972, and President Nixon closed the gold window at the Federal Reserve, taking the United States entirely off the gold standard.

President Gerald Ford introduced the slogan, "Whip Inflation Now" (WIN). In 1974, productivity shrunk by 1.5%, though this soon recovered. In 1976, Jimmy Carter won the Presidency. Carter would later take much of the blame for the even more turbulent economic times to come, though some say circumstances were outside his control. Inflation continued to climb skyward. Productivity growth was small, when not negative. Interest rates remained high, with the prime reaching 20% in January 1981; Art Buchwald quipped that 1980 would go down in history as the year when it was cheaper to borrow money from the Mafia than the local bank.

Unemployment dropped mostly steadily from 1975 to 1979, although it then began to rise sharply.

This period also saw the increased rise of the environmental and consumer movements, and the government established new regulations and regulatory agencies such as the Occupational Safety and Health Administration, the Consumer Product Safety Commission, the Nuclear Regulatory Commission, and others.

=== Deregulation and Reaganomics: 1976–1992 ===
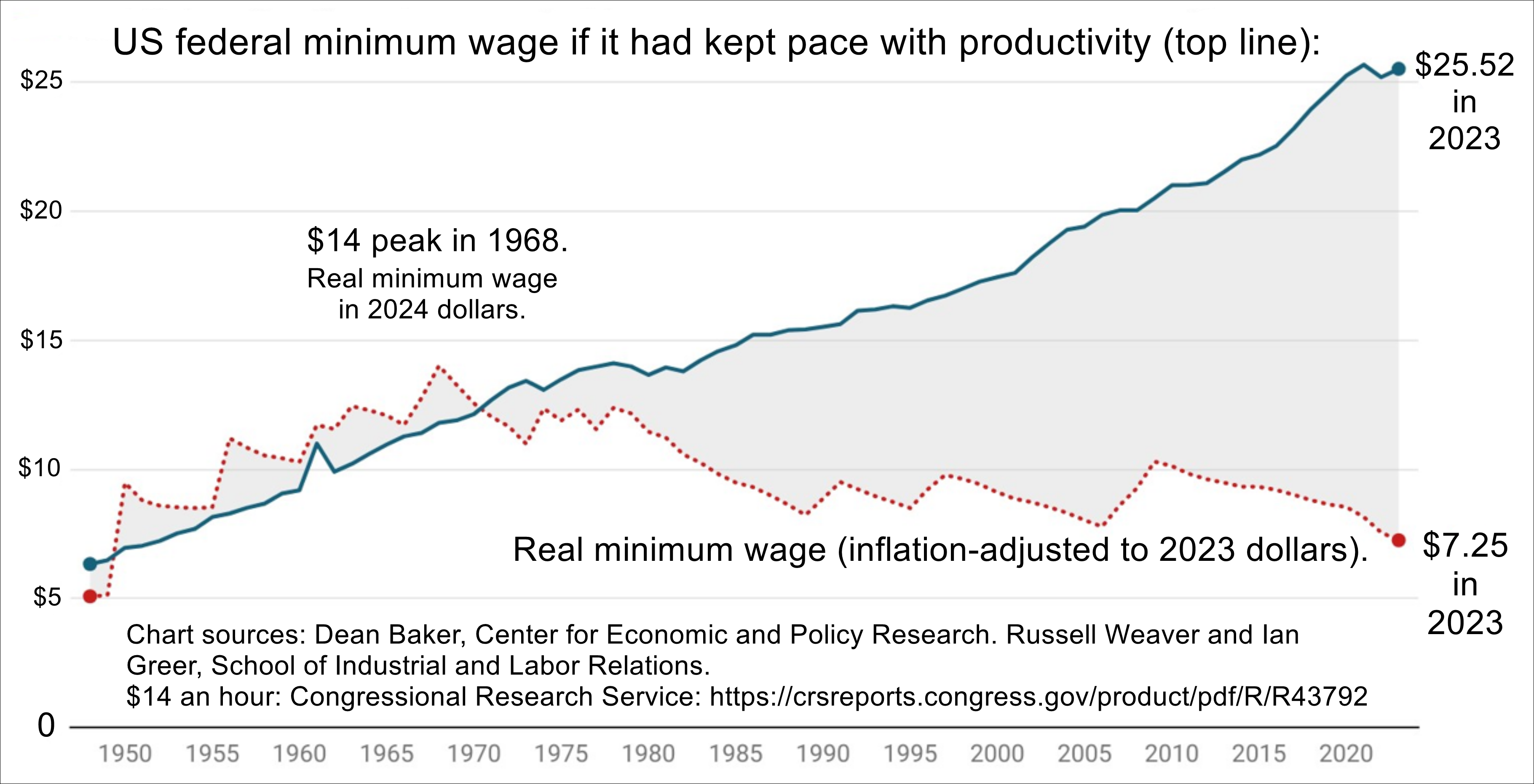
US federal minimum wage if it had kept pace with productivity. Also, the real minimum wage.

Deregulation gained momentum in the mid-1970s, spurred by slow productivity growth and increasing operation and capital costs in several key sectors. It was not until 1978 that the first meaningful deregulation legislation, the Airline Deregulation Act, was cleared by Congress. Transportation deregulation accelerated in 1980, with the deregulation of railroads and trucking. Deregulation of interstate buses followed in 1982. In addition to transportation deregulation, savings and loan associations and banks were partially deregulated with the Depository Institutions Deregulation and Monetary Control Act in 1980 and the Garn–St. Germain Depository Institutions Act in 1982.

On a broader front, the economy initially recovered at a brisk pace from the 1973–75 recession. Incoming president Jimmy Carter instituted a large fiscal stimulus package in 1977 in order to boost the economy. However, inflation began a steep rise beginning in late 1978, and rose by double digits following the 1979 energy crisis. In order to combat inflation, Carter appointed Paul Volcker to the Federal Reserve, who raised interest rates and caused a sharp recession in the first six months of 1980. In March 1980, Carter introduced his own policies for reducing inflation, and the Federal Reserve brought down interest rates to cooperate with the initiatives.

During the 1980 recession, manufacturing shed 1.1 million jobs, while service industries remained intact. Employment in automotive manufacturing in particular suffered, experiencing a 33% reduction by the end of the recession. Collectively these factors contributed to the election of Ronald Reagan in 1980. The Federal Reserve once again began to raise interest rates in 1981, which plunged the economy back into recession. Unemployment rose to a peak of 10.8% in December 1982, a post-war high.

In 1981, Ronald Reagan introduced Reaganomics. That is, fiscally expansive economic policies, cutting marginal federal income tax rates by 25%. Inflation dropped dramatically from 13.5% annually in 1980 to just 3% annually in 1983 due to a short recession and the Federal Reserve Chairman Paul Volcker's tighter control of the money supply and interest rates. Real GDP began to grow after contracting in 1980 and 1982. The unemployment rate continued to rise to a peak of 10.8% by late 1982, but dropped well under 6% unemployment at the end of Reagan's presidency in January 1989.

20 million jobs were created under Reagan's presidency – which were made up of 82 percent high-paying and long-term jobs. From 1982 to 1987 the Dow Jones Industrial Average gained over 1900 points from 776 in 1982 to 2722 in 1987 – about a 350% increase. An economic boom took place from 1983 until a recession began in 1990. Between 1983 and 1989 the number of people below the poverty line decreased by 3.8 million.

The boom saw the increasing popularity of electronic appliances like computers, cell phones, music players and video games. Credit cards were a symbol of the boom. The Reagan tax cuts seemed to work and Americans were able to shrug off the crash of 1987 by the beginning of 1988. The growth ended by 1990 after seven years of stock market growth and prosperity for the upper and middle class. The federal debt spawned by his policies tripled (from $930 billion in 1981 to $2.6 trillion in 1988), reaching record levels.

Though debt almost always increased under every president in the latter half of the 20th century, it declined as a percentage of GDP under all presidents after 1950 and prior to Reagan. In addition to the fiscal deficits, the U.S. started to have large trade deficits. Also it was during his second term that the Tax Reform Act of 1986 was passed. Vice President George H. W. Bush was elected to succeed Reagan in 1988. The early Bush Presidency's economic policies were sometimes seen as a continuation of Reagan's policies, but in the early 1990s, Bush went back on a promise and increased taxes in a compromise with Congressional Democrats. He ended his presidency on a moderate note, signing regulatory bills such as the Americans With Disabilities Act, and negotiating the North American Free Trade Agreement. In 1992, Bush and third-party candidate Ross Perot lost to Democrat Bill Clinton.

The advent of deindustrialization in the late 1960s and early 1970s saw income inequality increase dramatically to levels never seen before. But at the same time, most orthodox economists, and most policy makers, pointed to the fact that consumers could buy so many goods, even with the inflation of the 1970s, as evidence that the general shift away from manufacturing and into services was creating widespread prosperity. In 1968, the U.S. Gini coefficient was 0.386. In 2005, the American Gini coefficient had reached 0.469.

Critics of economic policies favored by Republican and Democratic administrations since the 1960s, particularly those expanding "free trade" and "open markets" (see Neoliberalism) say that these policies, though benefiting trading as well as the cost of products in the U.S., could have taken their own on the prosperity of the America middle-class. But in this period, consumers were buying as never before with so many products and goods at such low costs and in high quantities. Critics however argued that this consumer behavior was giving a false reading of the health of the economy, because it was being paid for by taking on rapidly increasing levels of indebtedness, thus covering up the stagnating wages and earnings of most of the workforce.

=== The rise of globalization: 1990s – late 2000 ===
This graph shows three major stock indices since 1975. Notice the meteoric rise of the stock market in the 1990s, followed by the collapse of the dot-com bubble in 2000 on the tech-heavy NASDAQ.

During the 1990s, government debt increased by 75%, GDP rose by 69%, and the stock market as measured by the S&P 500 grew more than threefold.

From 1994 to 2000 real output increased, inflation was manageable and unemployment dropped to below 5%, resulting in a soaring stock market known as the dot-com boom. The second half of the 1990s was characterized by well-publicized initial public offerings of high-tech and "dot-com" companies. By 2000, however, it was evident a bubble in stock valuations had occurred, such that beginning in March 2000, the market would give back some 50% to 75% of the growth of the 1990s.

=== Globalisation, deindustrialization and wage deflation ===
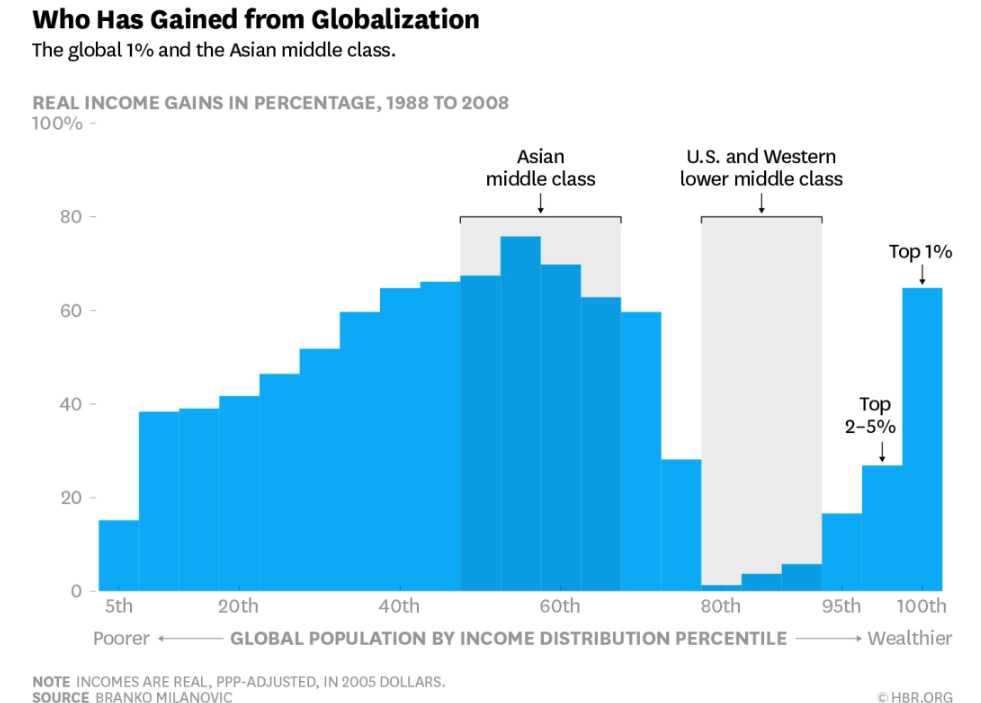
Real Income Gains in the Global Population

In 2010, Paul Krugman called for a general tariff rate of 25% on all Chinese products to halt the deindustrialization of the United States and the offshoring of American industries and factories to China. Paul Krugman notes that the trade deficit caused by free trade has been detrimental to the U.S. manufacturing sector: “There is no doubt that increased imports, particularly from China, have reduced manufacturing employment..., the complete elimination of the U.S. manufacturing trade deficit would add about two million manufacturing jobs. . In 2010, he expects Chinese surpluses to destroy 1.4 million American jobs by 2011. He therefore proposes taxing the products of certain countries to force them to readjust their currencies. He calls for a general rate of 25% on Chinese products.

In 2010, Krugman wrote that China pursues a mercantilist and predatory policy, leading to massive deindustrialization of the United States. He says it keeps its currency undervalued to accumulate trade surpluses using capital flow controls. The Chinese government sells renminbi and buys foreign currency to keep the renminbi low, giving China's manufacturing sector a cost advantage over its competitors. China's surpluses drain US demand, destroy US industry and slow economic recovery in other countries with which China trades. He notes that trade deficits impoverish the United States and pose a threat. Krugman writes: “This is the most distorted exchange rate policy any major nation has ever followed”. He notes that an undervalued renminbi is tantamount to high tariffs or export subsidies. A cheaper currency improves employment and competitiveness, as it makes imports more expensive while making domestic products more attractive.

Krugman notes that free trade leads to trade deficits, deindustrialization and lower real wages for less-educated workers due to competition from low-cost imports. Indeed, wages are falling more than import prices, and the problem is getting worse as trade with low-wage countries becomes more frequent. He also notes that free trade has a significant effect on deindustrialization and income inequality in developed countries.

Studies by David Autor, David Dorn and Gordon Hanson show that free trade with China cost Americans around one million manufacturing workers between 1991 and 2007. Competition from Chinese imports has led to manufacturing job losses and declining wages. They also found that offsetting job gains in other industries never materialized. Closed companies no longer order goods and services from local non-manufacturing firms and former industrial workers may be unemployed for years or permanently. Increased import exposure reduces wages in the non-manufacturing sector due to lower demand for non-manufacturing goods and increased labor supply from workers who have lost their manufacturing jobs. Other work by this team of economists, with Daron Acemoglu and Brendan Price, estimates that competition from Chinese imports cost the U.S. as many as 2.4 million jobs in total between 1999 and 2011.

Avraham Ebenstein, Margaret McMillan, Ann Harrison also pointed out in their article “Why are American Workers getting Poorer? China, Trade and Offshoring” these negative effects of trade with China on American workers.

The Economic Policy Institute, a left-leaning think tank, has claimed that free trade created a large trade deficit in the United States for decades which lead to the closure of multiple factories and cost the United States millions of jobs in the manufacturing sector. Trade deficits lead to significant wage losses, not only for workers in the manufacturing sector, but also for all workers throughout the economy who do not have a university degree. For example, in 2011, 100 million full-time, full-year workers without a university degree suffered an average loss of $1,800 (~$2,576 in 2025) on their annual salary. According to the Economic Policy Institute, the workers who lost their jobs in the manufacturing sector and who have to accept a reduction in their wages to find work in other sectors, are creating competition, that reduces the wages of workers already employed in these other sectors. The threat of offshoring of production facilities leads workers to accept wage cuts to keep their jobs.

According to the Economic Policy Institute, trade agreements have not reduced trade deficits but rather increased them. The growing trade deficit with China comes from China's manipulation of its currency, dumping policies, subsidies, trade barriers that give it an important advantage in international trade. In addition, industrial jobs lost by imports from China are significantly better paid than jobs created by exports to China. So even if imports were equal to exports, workers would still lose out on their wages.

According to the Economic Policy Institute, the manufacturing sector is a sector with high productivity growth, which promotes high wages and good benefits for its workers. Indeed, this sector accounts for more than two thirds of private sector research and development and employs more than twice as many scientists and engineers as the rest of the economy. The manufacturing sector therefore provides an important stimulus to overall economic growth. Manufacturing is also associated with well-paid service jobs such as accounting, business management, research and development and legal services. Deindustrialisation is therefore also leading to a significant loss of these service jobs. Deindustrialization thus means the disappearance of an important driver of economic growth.

=== Executive compensation ===
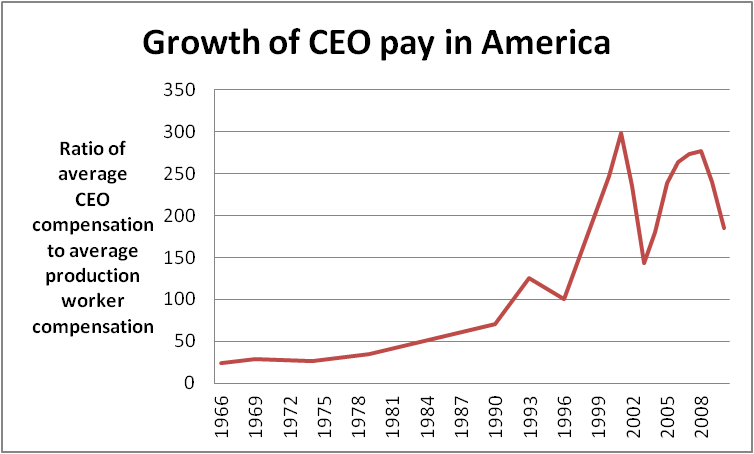
Ratio of the average compensation of CEOs from the top 350 firms and production workers, 1965–2009. Source: Economic Policy Institute. 2012. Based on data from Wall Street Journal/Mercer, Hay Group 2010.

In the late 20th century, business executives started being paid more in stock and less in salary, and at a disproportionately greater rate compared to other employees and to their own performance. CEO compensation at the top 350 firms increased by 940.3% from 1978 to 2018 in the United States. The typical worker's annual compensation grew just 11.9% within the same period. This disparity has been criticized as unfair, and large payouts after bad performance have been criticized as bad for shareholders.

== 21st century ==
The economy worsened in 2001 with output increasing only 0.3% and unemployment and business failures rising substantially, and triggering a recession that is often blamed on the September 11 attacks.

An additional factor in the fall of the US markets and in investor confidence included multiple corporate scandals.

In 2001–2007, the red-hot housing market across the United States fueled a false sense of security regarding the strength of the U.S. economy.

=== Decline of labor unions ===
Most unions in America are aligned with one of two larger umbrella organizations: the AFL–CIO created in 1955, and the Change to Win Federation which split from the AFL-CIO in 2005. Both advocate policies and legislation on behalf of workers in the United States and Canada, and take an active role in politics. The AFL–CIO is especially concerned with global trade issues.

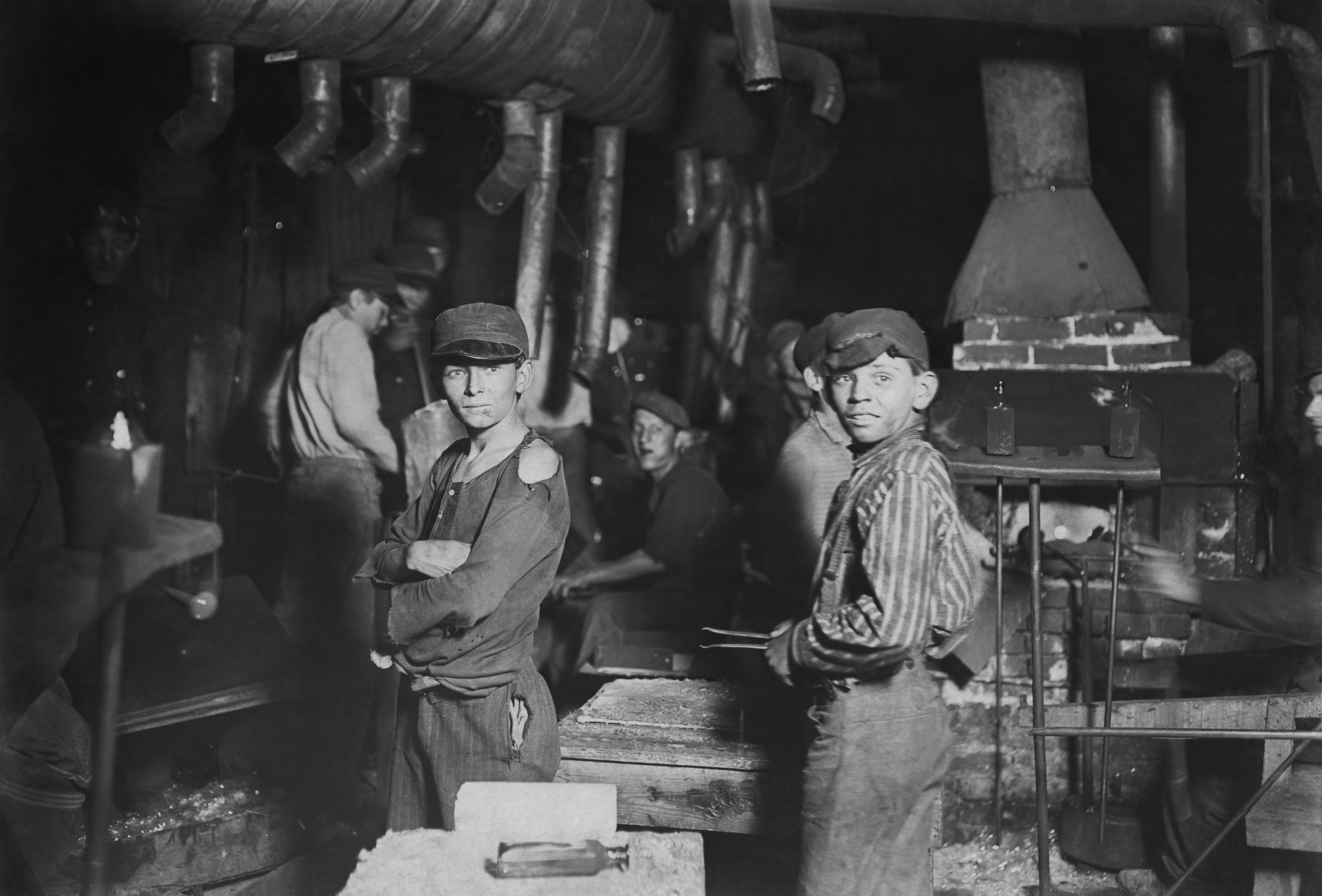
Child labourers in an Indiana glass works. Labor unions have an objective interest in combating child labour.

In 2010, the percentage of workers belonging to a union in the United States (or total labor union "density") was 11.4%, compared to 18.3% in Japan, 27.5% in Canada and 70% in Finland.

The most prominent unions are among public sector employees such as teachers, police and other non-managerial or non-executive federal, state, county and municipal employees. Members of unions are disproportionately older, male and residents of the Northeast, the Midwest, and California.

The majority of union members come from the public sector. Nearly 34.8% of public sector employees are union members. In the private sector, just 6.3% of employees are union members—levels not seen since 1932.

Union workers in the private sector average 10–30% higher pay than non-union in America after controlling for individual, job, and labour market characteristics.

=== Great Recession and aftermath (2007–2019) ===
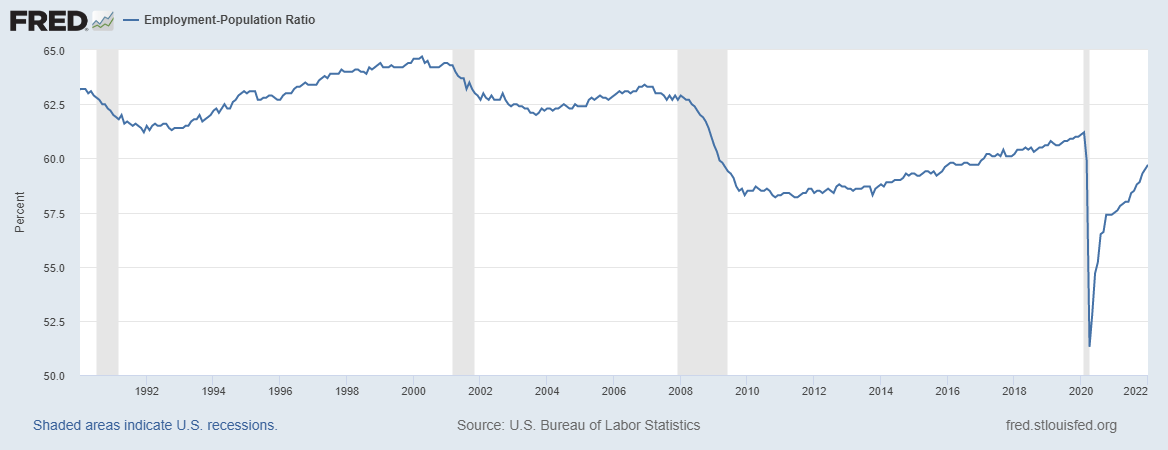
US Employment to population ratio, 1990–2021

The Great Recession was a sharp decline in the United States' economy. In 2008, a series of related economic disasters hit the American and European financial systems. The bursting of a worldwide bubble in housing set the recession in motion. The end of housing bubbles in California, Florida and Arizona led to the collapse of housing prices and the shrinkage of the construction sector. Millions of mortgages (averaging about $200,000 each) had been bundled into securities called collateralized debt obligations that were resold worldwide. Many banks and hedge funds had borrowed hundreds of billions of dollars to buy these securities, which were now "toxic" because their value was unknown and no one wanted to buy them.

A series of the largest banks in the U.S. and Europe collapsed; some went bankrupt, such as Lehman Brothers with $690 billion in assets; others such as the leading insurance company AIG, the leading bank Citigroup, and the two largest mortgage companies were bailed out by the government. Congress voted $700 billion in bailout money, and the Treasury and Federal Reserve committed trillions of dollars to shoring up the financial system, but the measures did not reverse the declines. Banks drastically tightened their lending policies, despite infusions of federal money. The government for the first time took major ownership positions in the largest banks. The stock market plunged 40%, wiping out tens of billions of dollars in wealth; housing prices fell 20% nationwide wiping out billions more. By late 2008 distress was spreading beyond the financial and housing sectors, especially as the "Big Three" of the automobile industry (General Motors, Ford and Chrysler) were on the verge of bankruptcy, and the retail sector showed major weaknesses. Critics of the $700 billion Troubled Assets Relief Program (TARP) expressed anger that much of the TARP money that has been distributed to banks is seemingly unaccounted for, with banks being secretive on the issue.

President Barack Obama signed the American Recovery and Reinvestment Act of 2009 in February 2009; the bill provides $787 billion in stimulus through a combination of spending and tax cuts. The plan is largely based on the Keynesian theory that government spending should offset the fall in private spending during an economic downturn; otherwise the fall in private spending may perpetuate itself and productive resources, such as the labor hours of the unemployed, will be wasted. Critics claim that government spending cannot offset a fall in private spending because the government must borrow money from the private sector in order to add money to it. However, most economists do not think such "crowding out" is an issue when interest rates are near zero and the economy is stagnant. Opponents of the stimulus also point to problems of possible future inflation and government debt caused by such a large expenditure.

In the U.S., jobs paying between $14 and $21 per hour made up about 60% those lost during the recession, but such mid-wage jobs have comprised only about 27% of jobs gained during the recovery through mid-2012. In contrast, lower-paying jobs constituted about 58% of the jobs regained.

=== Gig work ===
In the 21st century, proliferation of smartphones and increasing reliance on outsourced labor led to a class of "gig workers" who perform work such as package delivery for a company like Amazon.com or Walmart, food delivery for a company like DoorDash, or driving for a ridehailing company like Uber or Lyft. This has led to disputes alleging misclassification of employees as independent contractors.

=== Great Lockdown and aftermath (2019–present) ===
On September 16, 2019, the Federal Reserve announced that it would begin acting as the role of investor in order to provide funds in the repo markets after the overnight lending rate jumped above 8% due to a series of technical factors that limited the supply of available funds. Five months after the decision was made, the American stock markets suffered their biggest crash in modern U.S. history as a result of concerns surrounding the coronavirus pandemic and the Russia-Saudi Arabia oil price war. Before the crash happened, the unemployment rate in the United States stood at 3.6% in late 2019, which was the lowest unemployment rate since World War II. Although the unemployment rate decreased substantially between 2009 and 2019, income inequality continued to increase. In September 2019, the United States Census Bureau reported that income inequality in the United States had reached its highest level in 50 years, with the Gini index increasing from 48.2 in 2017 to 48.5 in 2018. Despite the low unemployment, the ISM Manufacturing Index dropped below 50% in August 2019, reaching a record low of 48.3% in October of that year (which was the lowest level since June 2009); it would continue to remain below 50% in the months leading up to the crash.

=== AI bubble ===
As of 2026, the vast majority of U.S. economic growth stemmed from investments into AI infrastructure.

== Historical statistics ==
=== GDP ===
==== 1790–2006 GDP ====
United States annual economic data

United States annual economic data
Year	GDP, nominal ($ billions)	GDP, adjusted ($ billions)	Population (millions)	GDP per capita, nominal ($)	GDP per capita, nominal adjusted ($)
1790	0.19	3.60	3.929	48	916
1791	0.21	3.82	4.048	52	944
1792	0.22	4.10	4.171	53	983
1793	0.25	4.43	4.297	58	1031
1794	0.31	5.00	4.428	70	1129
1795	0.38	5.31	4.562	83	1164
1796	0.41	5.47	4.700	87	1164
1797	0.41	5.57	4.843	85	1150
1798	0.41	5.80	4.990	82	1162
1799	0.44	6.20	5.141	86	1206
1800	0.48	6.55	5.397	91	1237
1801	0.51	6.87	5.486	93	1252
1802	0.45	7.09	5.679	79	1248
1803	0.48	7.21	5.872	82	1228
1804	0.53	7.49	6.065	87	1235
1805	0.56	7.88	6.258	89	1259
1806	0.61	8.26	6.451	95	1280
1807	0.58	8.27	6.644	87	1245
1808	0.64	8.28	6.838	94	1211
1809	0.68	8.92	7.031	97	1269
1810	0.70	9.40	7.424	97	1301
1811	0.76	9.82	7.460	102	1316
1812	0.78	10.2	7.700	101	1326
1813	0.96	10.8	7.939	121	1358
1814	1.06	11.2	8.179	130	1372
1815	0.91	11.3	8.419	108	1342
1816	0.81	11.3	8.659	94	1304
1817	0.76	11.5	8.899	85	1297
1818	0.72	12.0	9.139	79	1308
1819	0.72	12.3	9.379	77	1309
1820	0.70	12.8	9.618	73	1328
1821	0.73	13.4	9.939	73	1351
1822	0.80	14.0	10.268	78	1360
1823	0.75	14.5	10.596	71	1364
1824	0.75	15.3	10.924	69	1400
1825	0.81	16.0	11.252	72	1421
1826	0.86	16.6	11.580	74	1431
1827	0.91	17.1	11.909	76	1433
1828	0.89	17.3	12.237	73	1415
1829	0.92	18.0	12.565	73	1431
1830	1.01	19.5	12.901	78	1518
1831	1.04	21.2	13.321	78	1591
1832	1.12	22.6	13.742	82	1646
1833	1.14	23.3	14.162	80	1647
1834	1.20	23.7	14.582	82	1625
1835	1.32	25.0	15.003	88	1664
1836	1.46	25.7	15.423	95	1667
1837	1.54	26.0	15.843	97	1639
1838	1.58	27.1	16.264	97	1663
1839	1.65	27.8	16.684	99	1666
1840	1.55	27.8	17.123	91	1622
1841	1.63	28.4	17.733	92	1603
1842	1.60	29.4	18.345	87	1600
1843	1.55	30.8	18.957	82	1623
1844	1.69	32.6	19.569	86	1665
1845	1.84	34.6	20.182	91	1715
1846	2.04	37.4	20.794	98	1799
1847	2.39	40.0	21.406	112	1870
1848	2.41	41.4	22.018	109	1881
1849	2.40	42.0	22.631	106	1855
1850	2.56	43.9	23.261	110	1889
1851	2.70	47.5	24.086	112	1972
1852	3.04	53.0	24.911	122	2128
1853	3.28	57.3	25.736	127	2226
1854	3.68	59.3	26.561	139	2232
1855	3.94	61.7	27.386	144	2254
1856	4.00	64.1	28.212	142	2270
1857	4.13	64.4	29.037	142	2218
1858	4.05	67.1	29.862	136	2247
1859	4.38	72.0	30.687	143	2346
1860	4.32	72.3	31.513	137	2296
1861	4.58	73.7	32.351	142	2277
1862	5.76	82.9	33.188	174	2497
1863	7.60	89.3	34.026	223	2624
1864	9.43	90.4	34.863	270	2592
1865	9.86	93.0	35.701	276	2606
1866	8.98	88.8	36.538	246	2430
1867	8.33	90.4	37.376	223	2418
1868	8.14	93.9	38.213	213	2458
1869	7.85	96.6	39.051	201	2473
1870	7.79	100	39.905	195	2509
1871	7.68	105	40.938	188	2573
1872	8.21	113	41.972	196	2683
1873	8.68	123	43.006	202	2824
1874	8.43	124	44.040	191	2815
1875	8.05	123	45.073	179	2726
1876	8.21	128	46.107	178	2781
1877	8.27	132	47.141	175	2804
1878	8.31	139	48.174	172	2894
1879	9.36	157	49.208	190	3188
1880	10.4	170	50.262	206	3379
1881	11.6	191	51.542	226	3708
1882	12.2	201	52.821	231	3800
1883	12.3	206	54.100	227	3808
1884	11.8	203	55.379	212	3667
1885	11.4	201	56.658	202	3552
1886	12.0	218	57.938	208	3764
1887	13.0	234	59.217	219	3944
1888	13.8	249	60.496	227	4108
1889	13.8	258	61.775	224	4169
1890	15.2	284	63.056	240	4502
1891	15.5	287	64.361	240	4459
1892	16.4	301	65.666	250	4590
1893	15.5	284	66.970	231	4242
1894	14.2	271	68.275	208	3972
1895	15.6	300	69.580	224	4313
1896	15.4	294	70.885	218	4153
1897	16.1	307	72.189	223	4256
1898	18.2	344	73.494	248	4685
1899	19.5	365	74.799	261	4884
1900	20.7	376	76.194	272	4943
1901	22.4	397	77.584	289	5112
1902	24.2	417	79.163	305	5261
1903	26.1	429	80.632	323	5317
1904	25.8	414	82.166	314	5034
1905	28.9	459	83.822	344	5480
1906	30.9	475	85.450	362	5564
1907	34.0	492	87.008	391	5649
1908	30.3	439	88.710	342	4949
1909	32.2	468	90.490	356	5169
1910	33.4	473	92.407	362	5116
1911	34.3	488	93.863	366	5200
1912	37.4	511	95.335	392	5359
1913	39.1	531	97.225	403	5462
1914	36.5	490	99.111	368	4948
1915	38.7	504	100.546	385	5011
1916	49.6	574	101.961	487	5626
1917	59.7	560	103.268	578	5418
1918	75.8	610	103.208	735	5910
1919	78.3	615	104.514	749	5883
1920	88.4	609	106.461	830	5721
1921	73.6	595	108.538	678	5483
1922	73.4	628	110.049	667	5708
1923	85.4	711	111.947	763	6350
1924	87.0	733	114.109	762	6422
1925	90.6	750	115.829	782	6475
1926	97.0	799	117.397	826	6806
1927	95.5	807	119.035	803	6777
1928	97.4	816	120.509	808	6771
1929	103.6	865.2	121.767	851	7105
1930	91.2	790.7	123.077	741	6424
1931	76.5	739.9	124.040	617	5965
1932	58.7	643.7	124.840	470	5156
1933	56.4	635.5	125.579	449	5061
1934	66.0	704.2	126.374	522	5572
1935	73.3	766.9	127.250	576	6027
1936	83.8	866.6	128.053	654	6768
1937	91.9	911.1	128.825	713	7072
1938	86.1	879.7	129.825	663	6776
1939	92.2	950.7	130.880	704	7264
1940	101.4	1034.1	131.954	768	7837
1941	126.7	1211.1	133.121	952	9098
1942	161.9	1435.4	133.920	1209	10718
1943	198.6	1670.9	134.245	1479	12447
1944	219.8	1806.5	132.885	1654	13594
1945	223.1	1786.3	132.481	1684	13483
1946	222.3	1589.4	140.054	1587	11348
1947	244.2	1574.5	143.446	1702	10976
1948	269.2	1643.2	146.093	1843	11248
1949	267.3	1634.6	148.665	1798	10995
1950	293.8	1777.3	151.235	1943	11752
1951	339.3	1915.0	153.310	2213	12491
1952	358.3	1988.3	155.687	2301	12771
1953	379.4	2079.5	158.242	2398	13141
1954	380.4	2065.4	161.164	2360	12816
1955	414.8	2212.8	164.308	2525	13467
1956	437.5	2255.8	167.306	2615	13483
1957	461.1	2301.1	170.371	2706	13506
1958	467.2	2279.2	173.320	2696	13150
1959	506.6	2441.3	176.289	2874	13848
1960	526.4	2501.8	179.979	2925	13901
1961	544.7	2560.0	182.992	2977	13990
1962	585.6	2715.2	185.771	3152	14616
1963	617.7	2834.0	188.483	3277	15036
1964	663.6	2998.6	191.141	3472	15688
1965	719.1	3191.1	193.526	3716	16489
1966	787.8	3399.1	195.576	4028	17380
1967	832.6	3484.6	197.457	4217	17647
1968	911.0	3652.7	199.399	4564	18319
1969	984.6	3765.4	201.385	4889	18698
1970	1038.5	3771.9	203.984	5091	18491
1971	1127.1	3898.6	206.827	5449	18850
1972	1238.3	4105.0	209.284	5917	19614
1973	1382.7	4341.5	211.357	6542	20541
1974	1500.0	4319.6	213.342	7031	20247
1975	1638.3	4311.2	215.465	7604	20009
1976	1825.3	4540.9	217.583	8389	20870
1977	2030.9	4750.5	219.760	9241	21617
1978	2294.7	5015.0	222.095	10332	22580
1979	2563.3	5173.4	224.567	11414	23037
1980	2789.5	5161.7	227.225	12276	22716
1981	3128.4	5291.7	229.466	13633	23061
1982	3255.0	5189.3	231.664	14051	22400
1983	3536.7	5423.8	233.792	15128	23199
1984	3933.2	5813.6	235.825	16678	24652
1985	4220.3	6053.7	237.924	17738	25444
1986	4462.8	6263.6	240.133	18585	26084
1987	4739.5	6475.1	242.289	19561	26725
1988	5103.8	6742.7	244.499	20875	27578
1989	5484.4	6981.4	246.819	22220	28286
1990	5803.1	7112.5	249.623	23247	28493
1991	5995.9	7100.5	252.981	23701	28067
1992	6337.7	7336.6	256.514	24707	28601
1993	6657.4	7532.7	259.919	25613	28981
1994	7072.2	7835.5	263.126	26878	29779
1995	7397.7	8031.7	266.278	27782	30163
1996	7816.9	8328.9	269.394	29017	30917
1997	8304.3	8703.5	272.647	30458	31922
1998	8747.0	9066.9	275.854	31709	32868
1999	9268.4	9470.3	279.040	33215	33939
2000	9817.0	9817.0	282.217	34785	34785
2001	10128.0	9890.7	285.226	35509	34677
2002	10469.6	10048.8	288.126	36337	34876
2003	10960.8	10301.0	290.796	37692	35423
2004	11685.9	10675.8	293.638	39797	36357
2005	12433.9	11003.4	296.507	41935	37110
2006	13194.7	11319.4	299.98	44071	37807

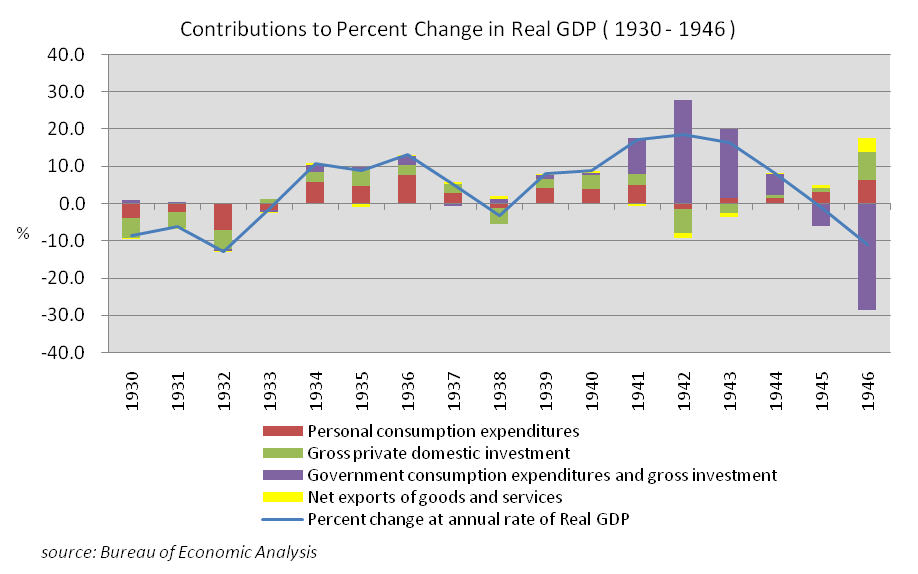
Contributions to Percent Change in Real GDP (1930–1946); source: Bureau of Economic Analysis

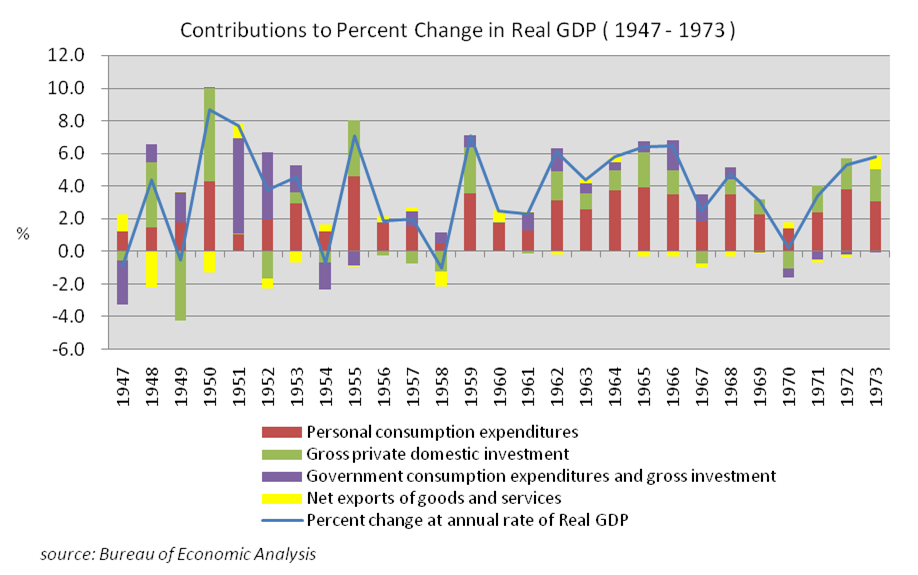
Contributions to Percent Change in Real GDP (1947–1973); source: Bureau of Economic Analysis

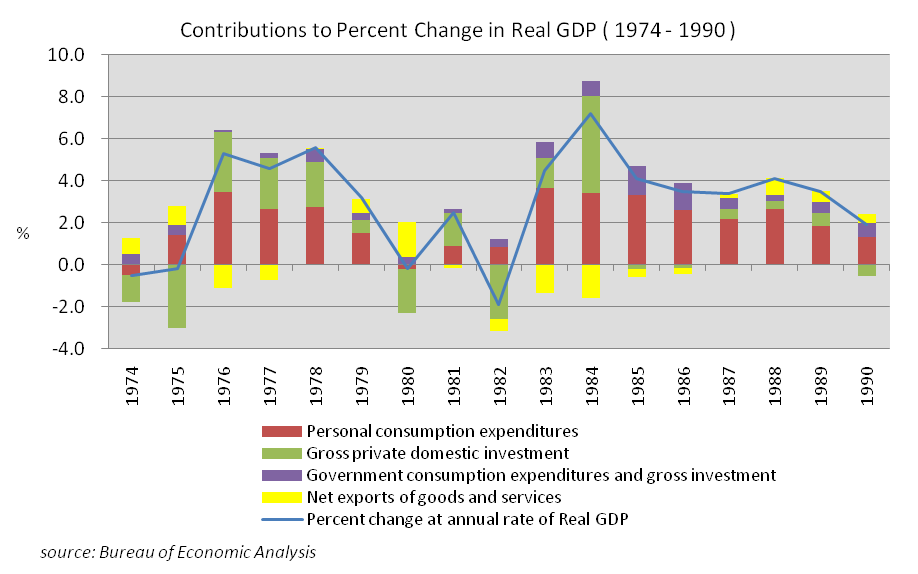
Contributions to Percent Change in Real GDP (1974–1990); source: Bureau of Economic Analysis

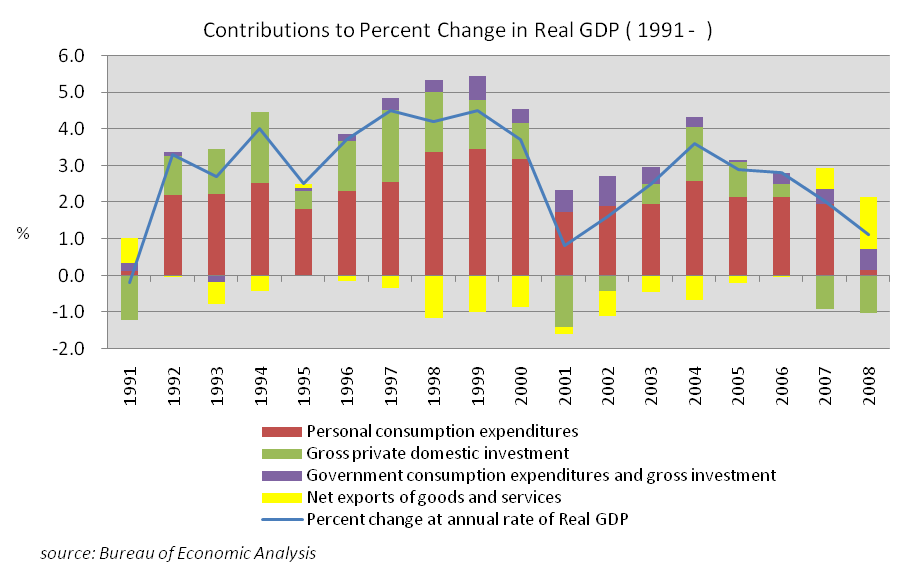
Contributions to Percent Change in Real GDP (1991–2008), source Bureau of Economic Analysis

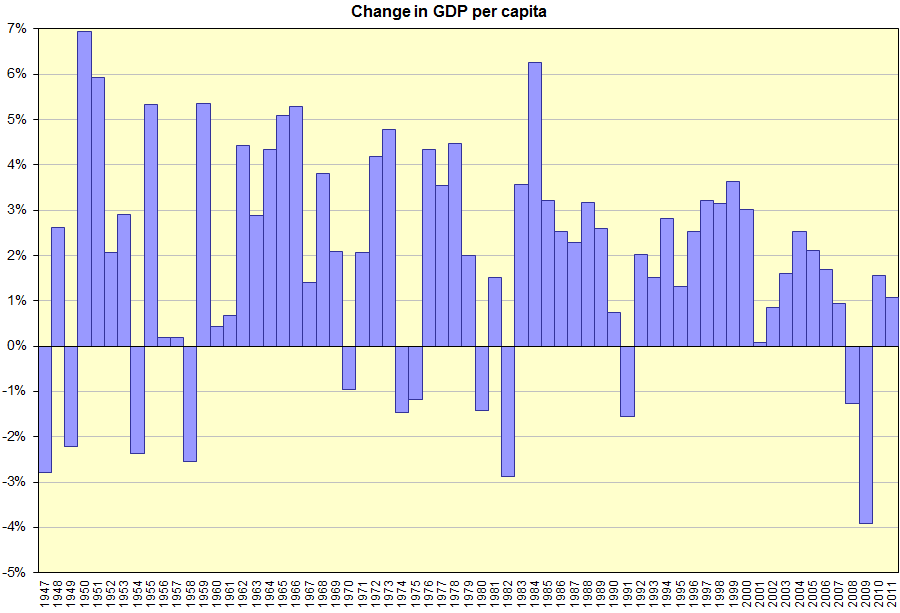
GDP per capita growth.

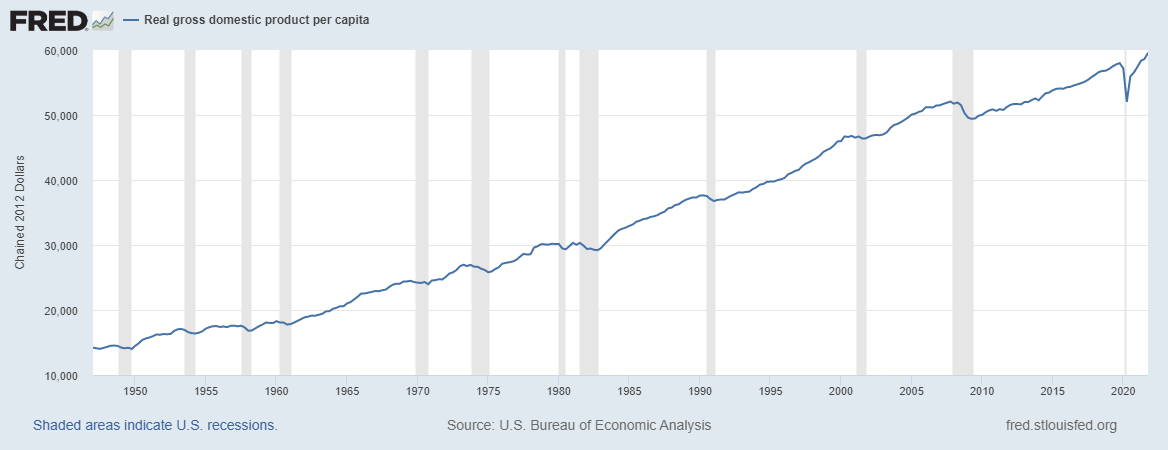
Real GDP per capita in the United States

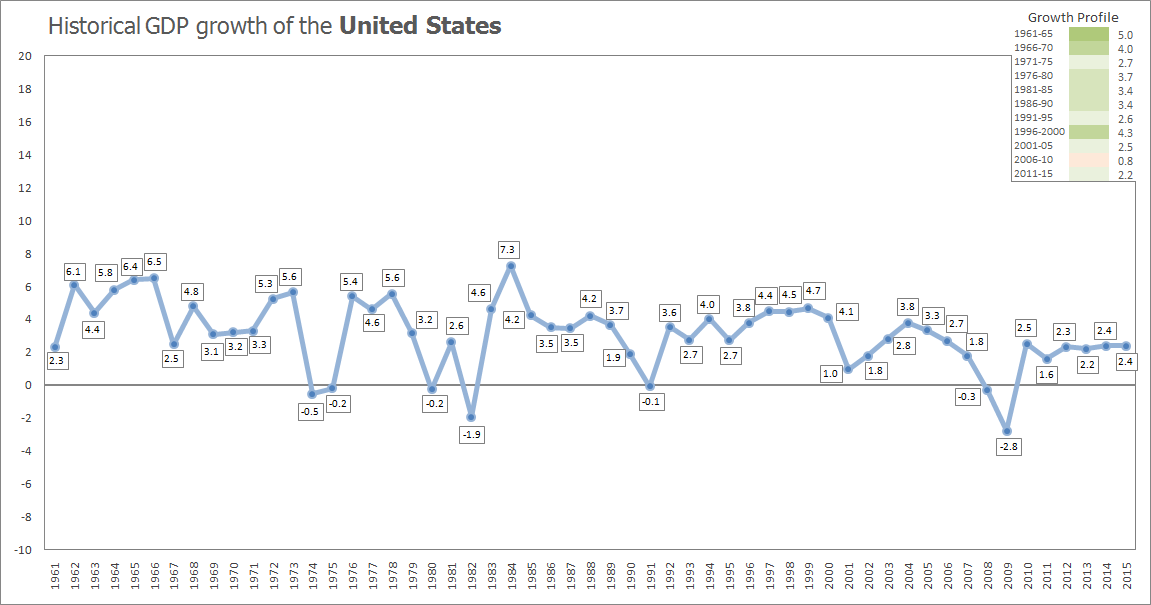
Historical growth of the U.S. economy from 1961 to 2015

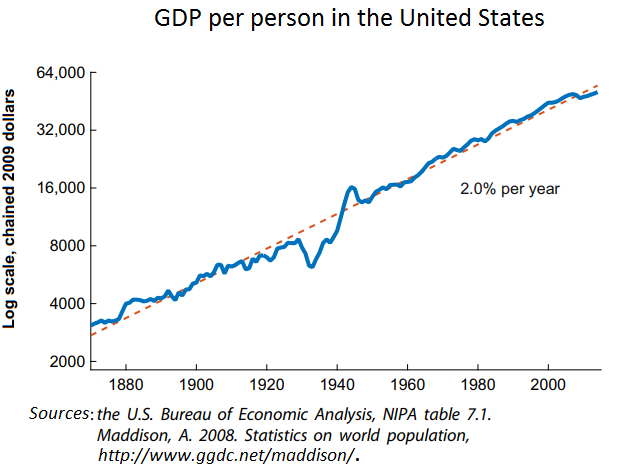
GDP per person in the United States

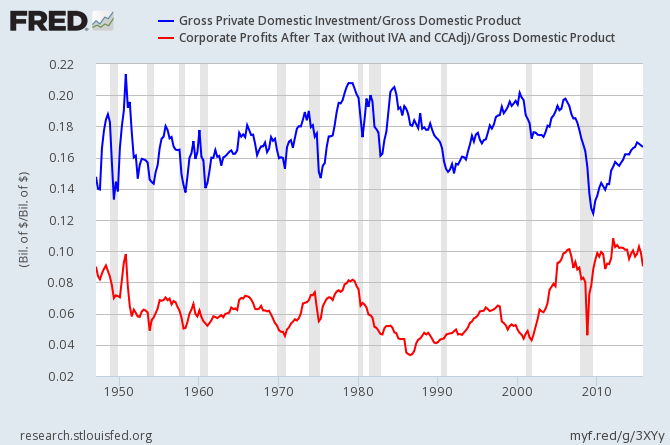
US Gross Private Domestic Investment and Corporate Profits After Tax as shares of Gross Domestic Product

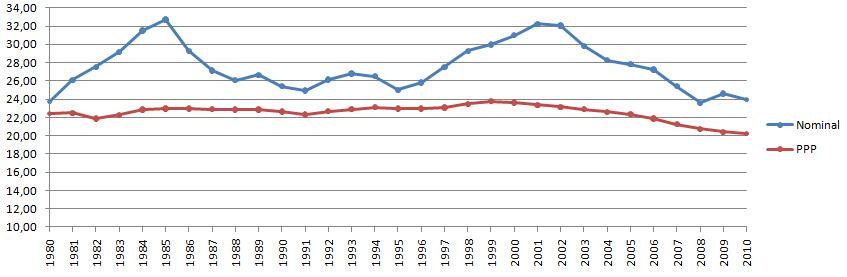
US share of world GDP (%) since 1980.
US share of world GDP (nominal) peaked in 1985 with 32.74% of global GDP (nominal). The second-highest share was 32.24% in 2001.
US share of world GDP (PPP) peaked in 1999 with 23.78% of global GDP (PPP). The share has been declining each year since then.

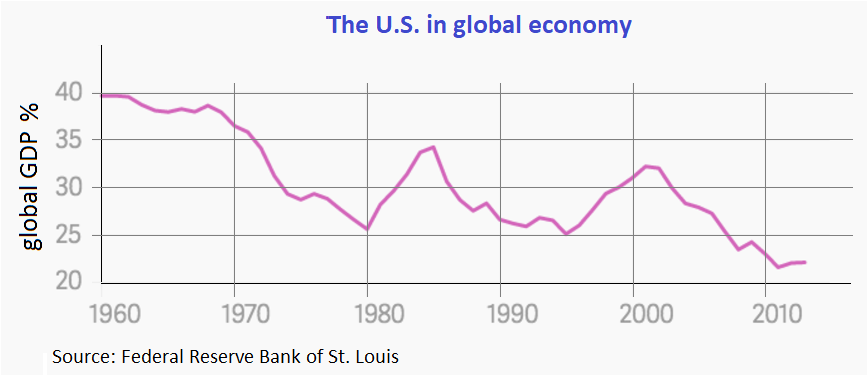
U.S. in global economy

=== Employment ===
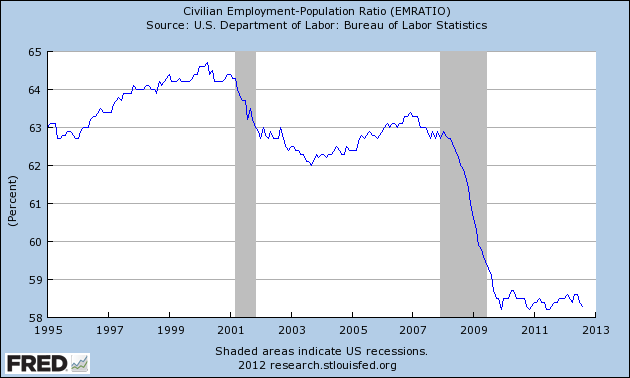
The Percentage of the U.S. working age population employed, 1995–2012.

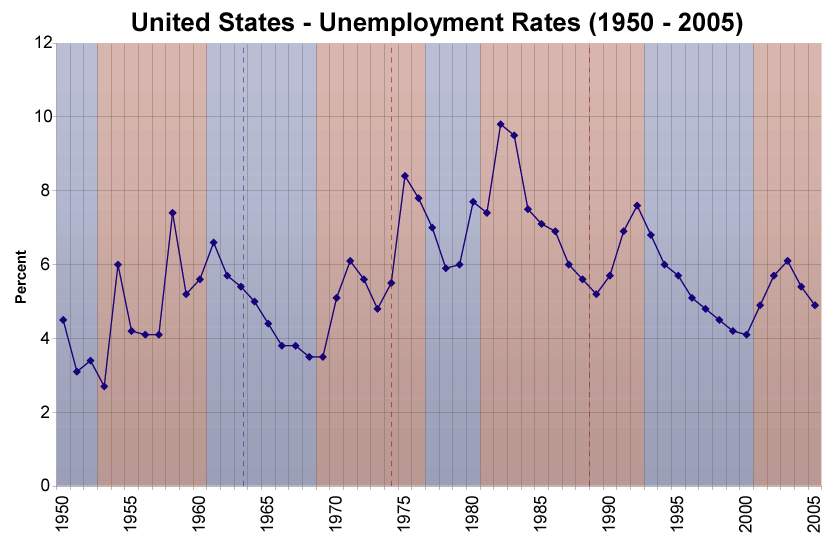
Official U.S. unemployment rate, 1950–2005

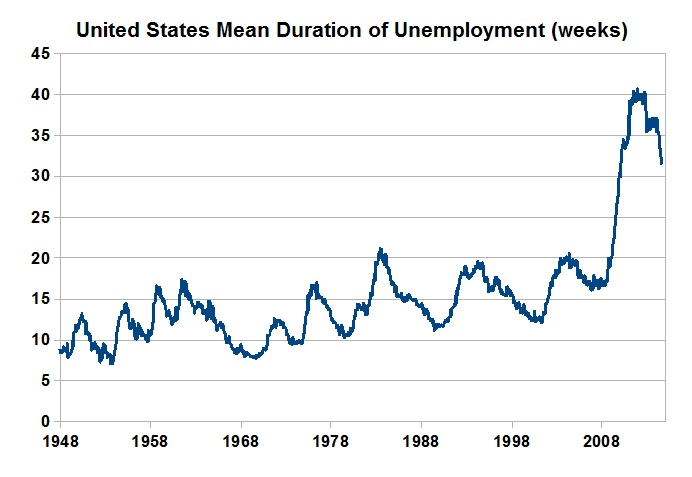
United States mean duration of unemployment 1948–2010.

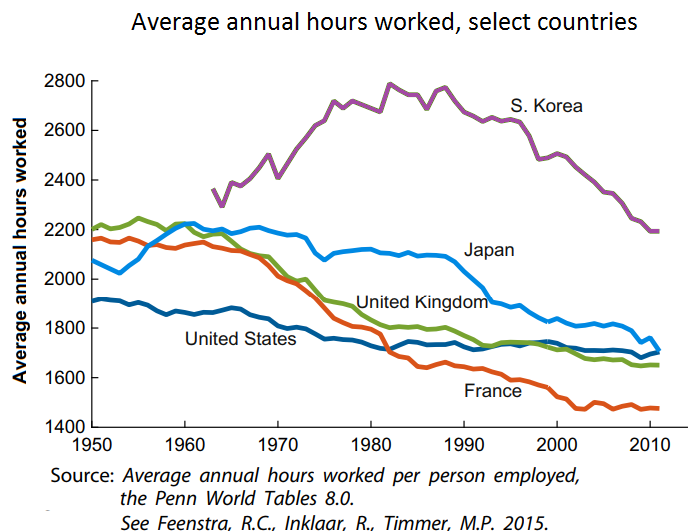
Average annual hours worked

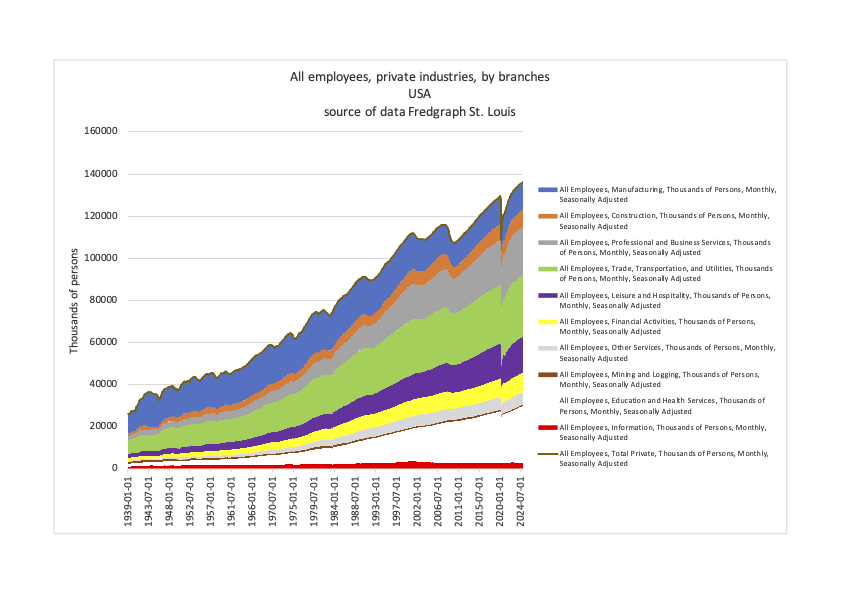
All employees, private industries, by branches

=== Manufacturing ===
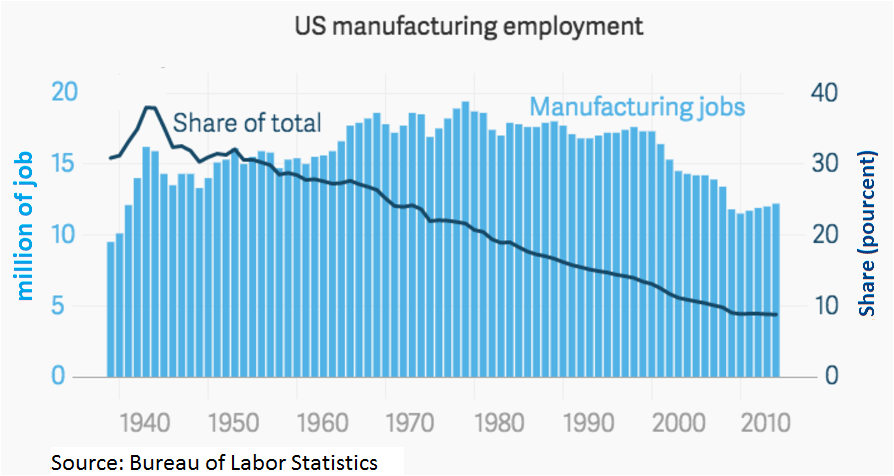
U.S. manufacturing employment

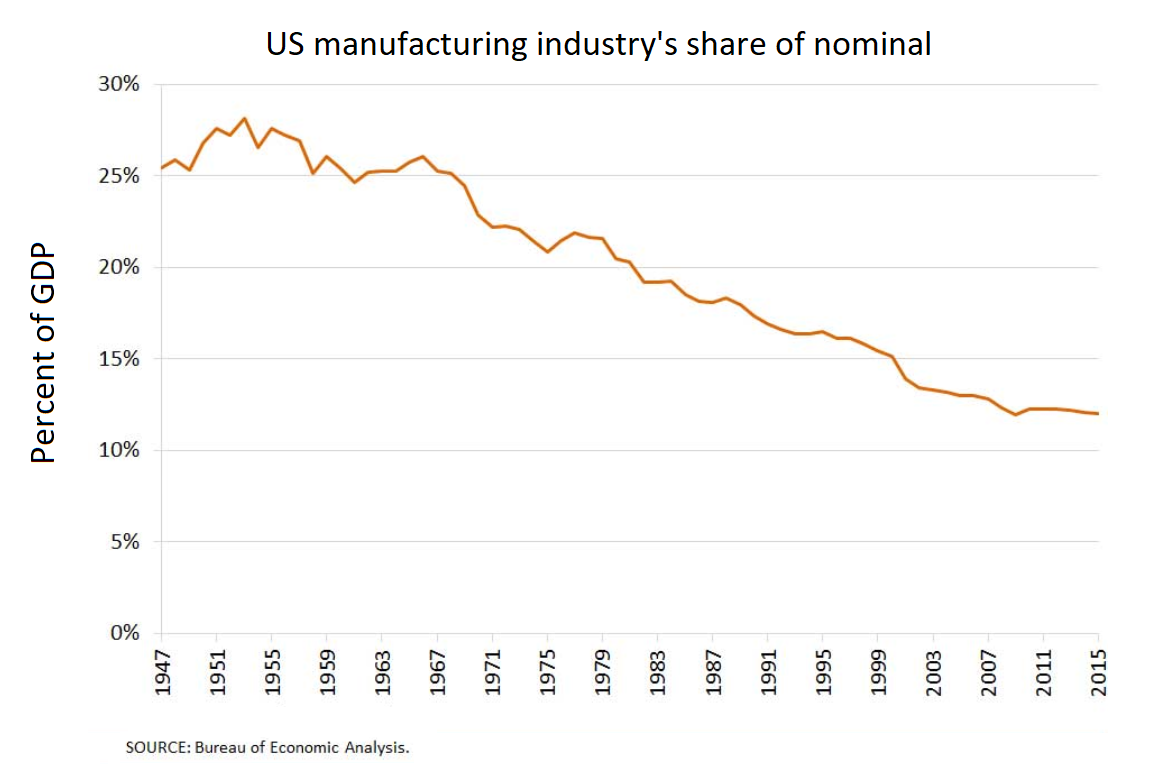
U.S. manufacturing industry's share of nominal GDP

=== Income ===
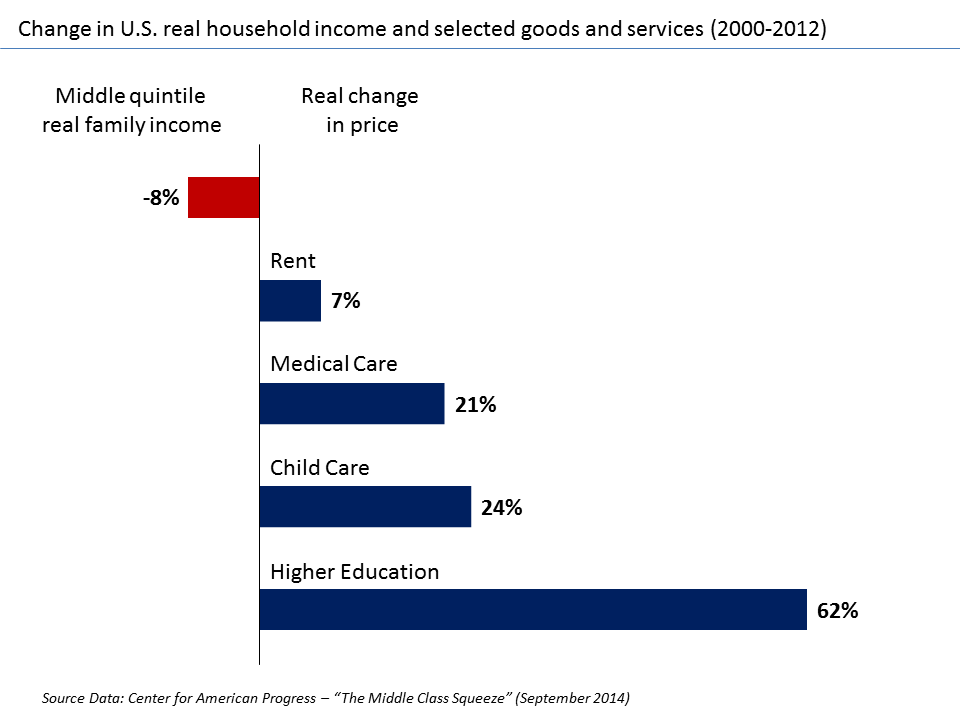
U.S. Change in real income versus selected goods and services v1

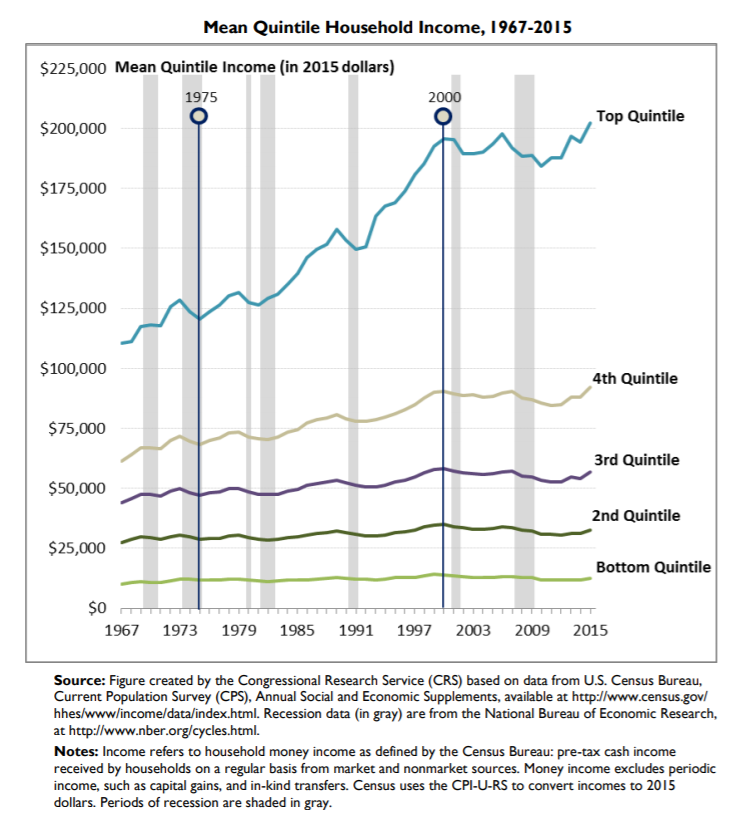
Mean Quintile Household Income (1967–2015)

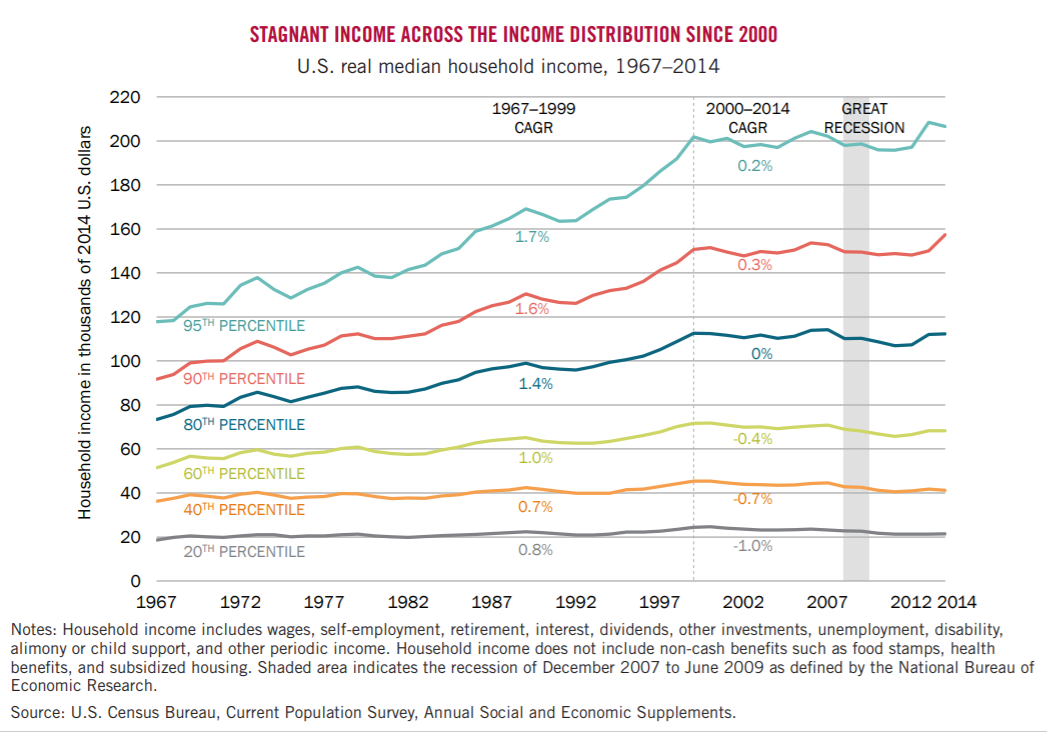
U.S. real median household income, 1967–2014

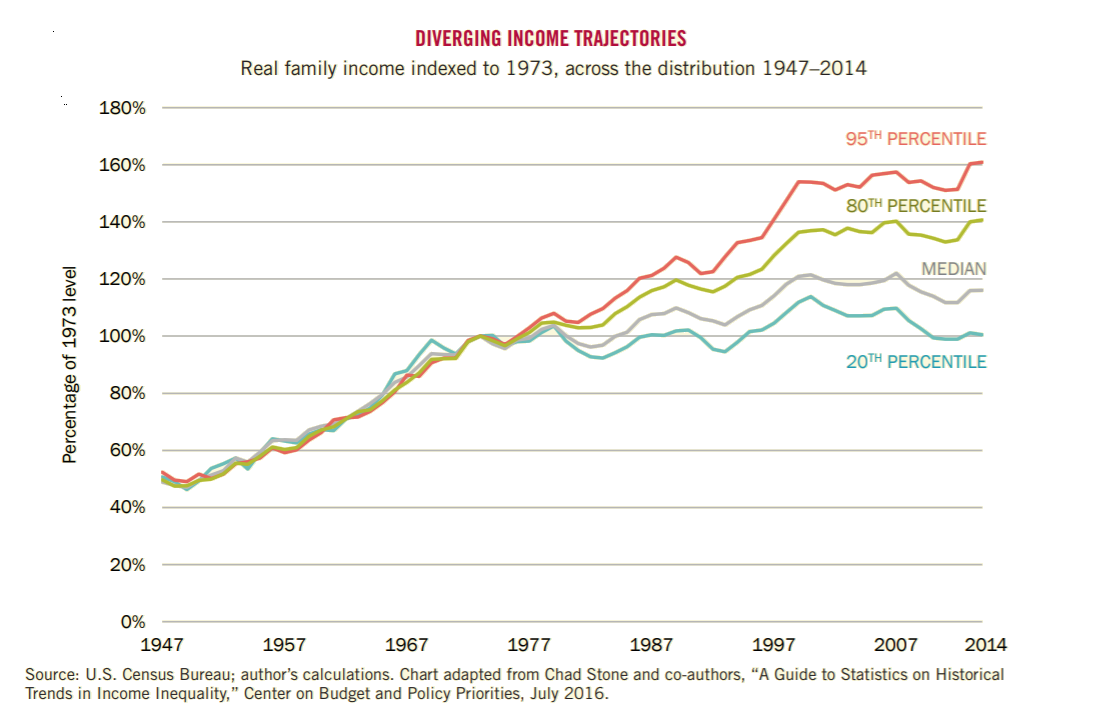
Real family income indexed to 1973, across the distribution 1947–2014

=== Compensation ===
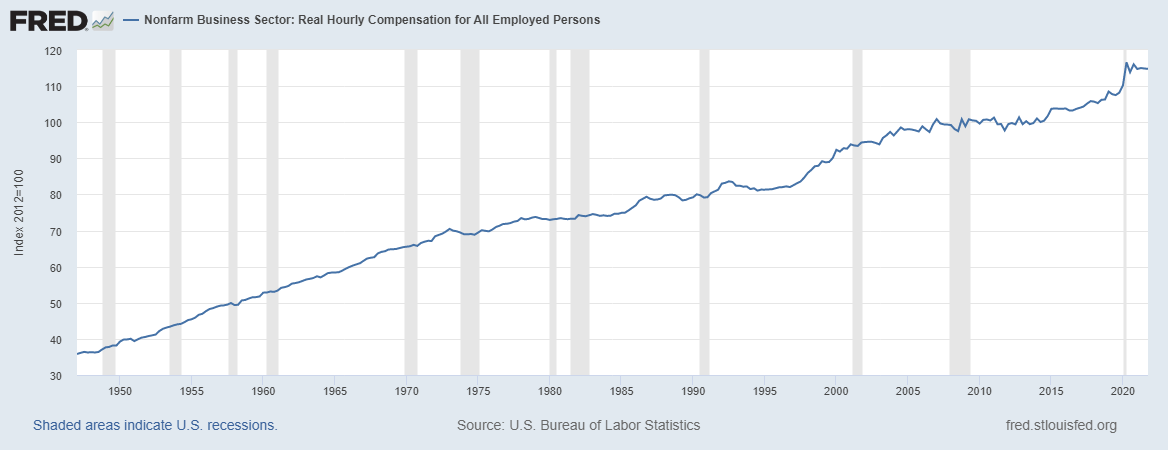
Real compensation per hour in the U.S. (1947–2021).

=== Wage ===
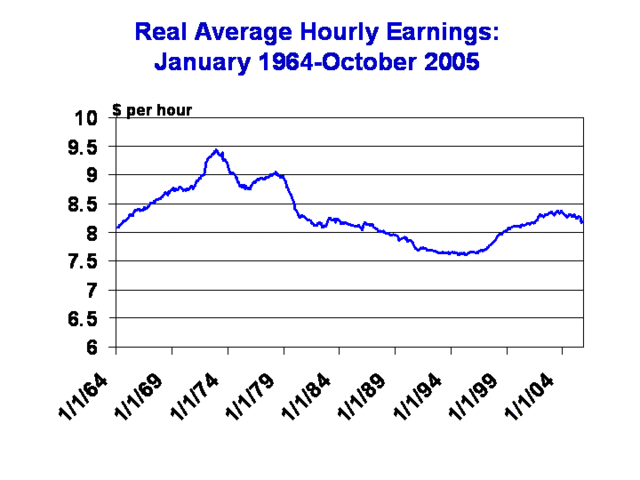
Historical graph of real wages in the U.S. from 1964 to 2005.

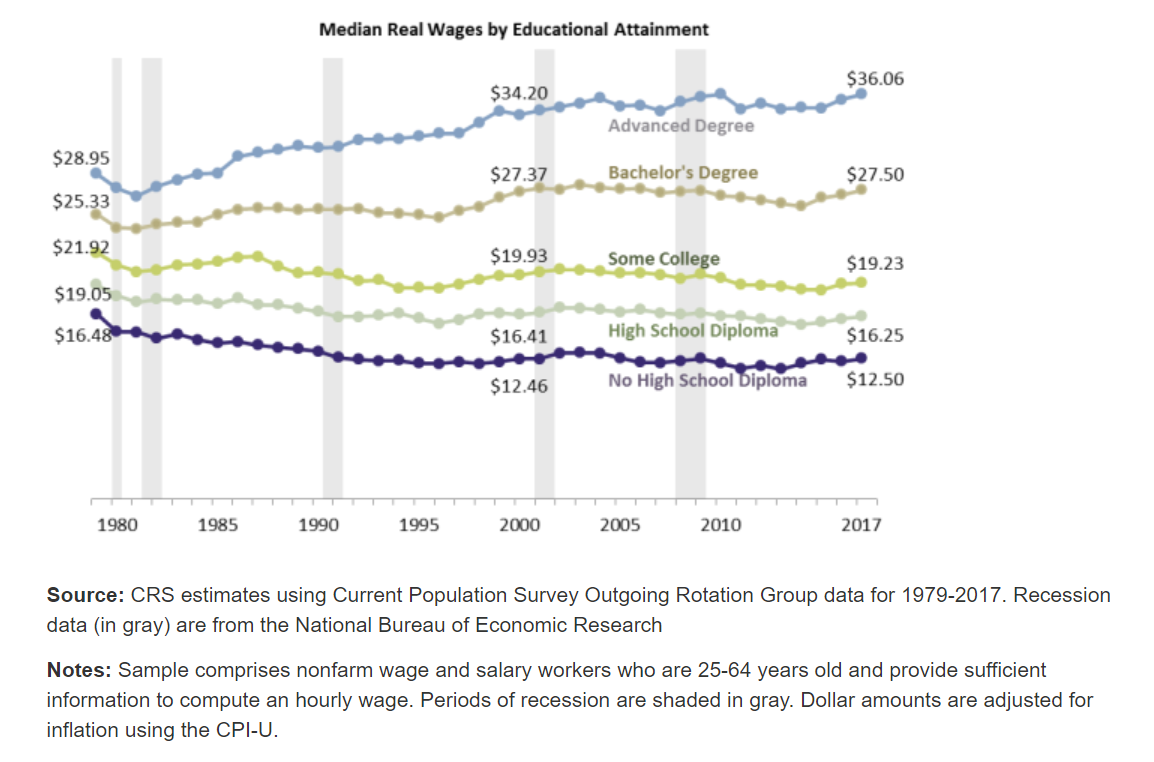
Median Real Wages by Educational Attainment.png

=== Productivity ===
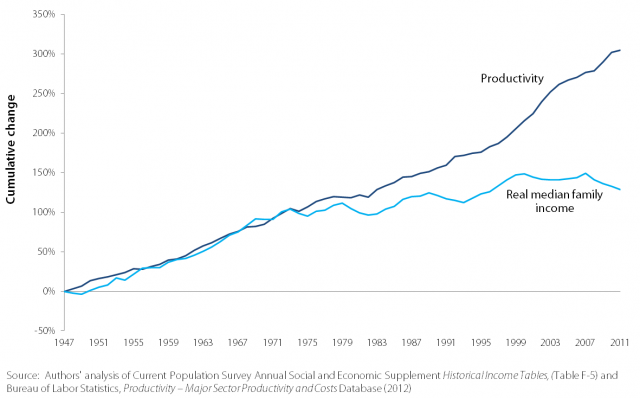
Productivity and real median family income growth, 1947–2009.

The share of national income going to employees is at approximately the same level now as it was in 1970.

Much of the apparent divergence between pay and productivity stems from using different surveys and formulas to calculate inflation.

=== Inequality ===
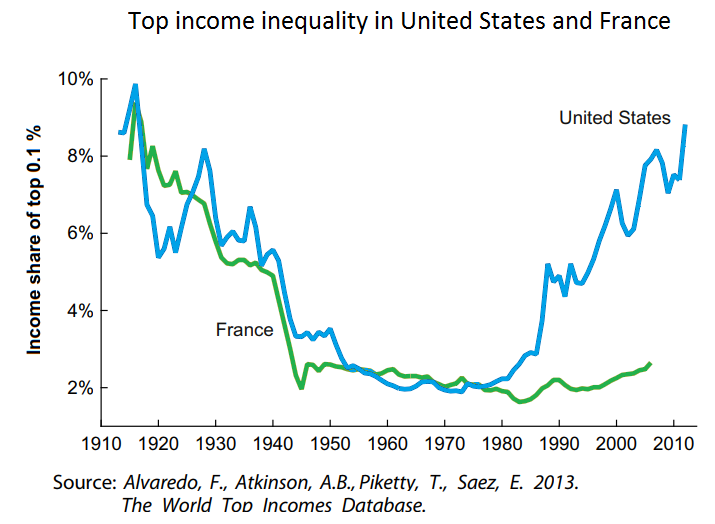
Top income inequality in the United States and France

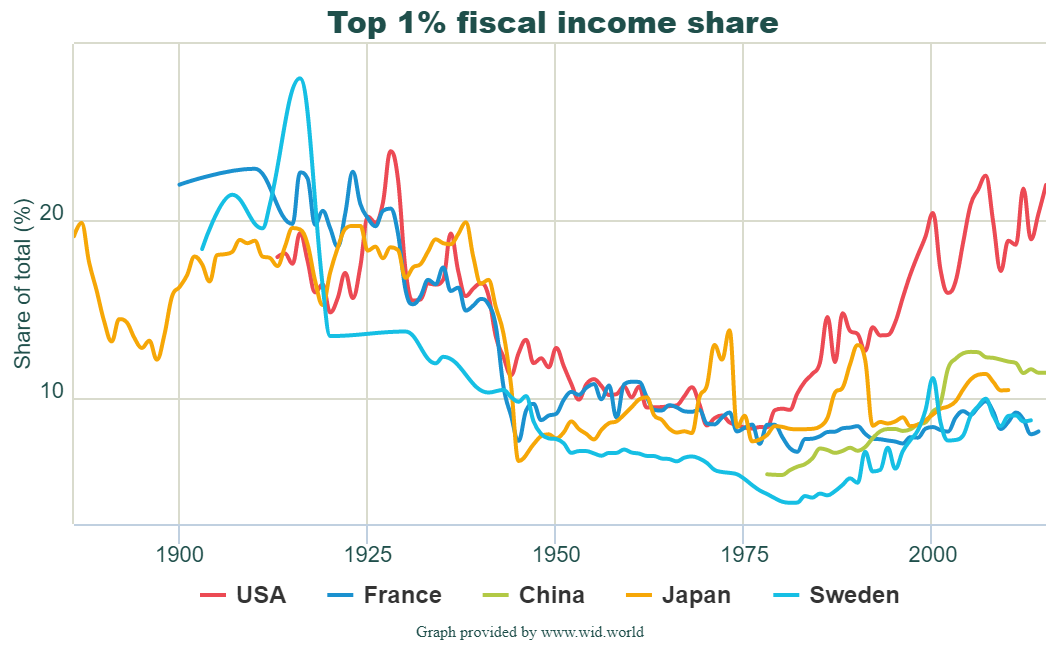
Top 1% fiscal income share

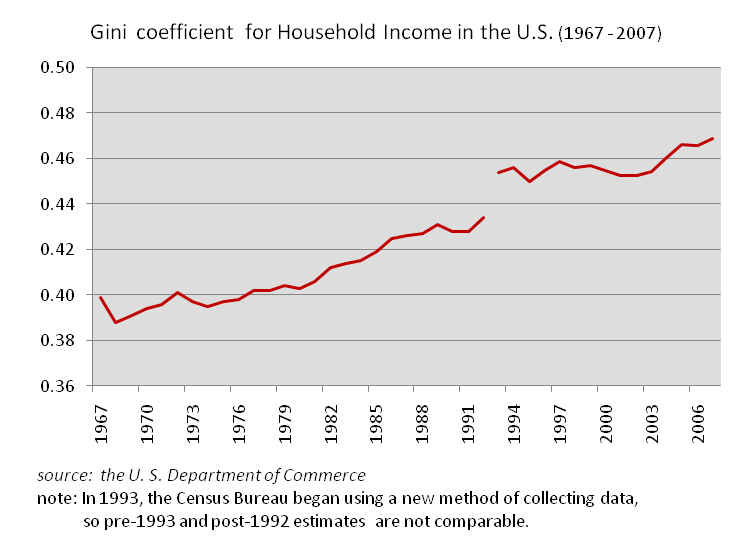
Gini Coefficient for Household Income (1967–2007), source United States Chamber of Commerce

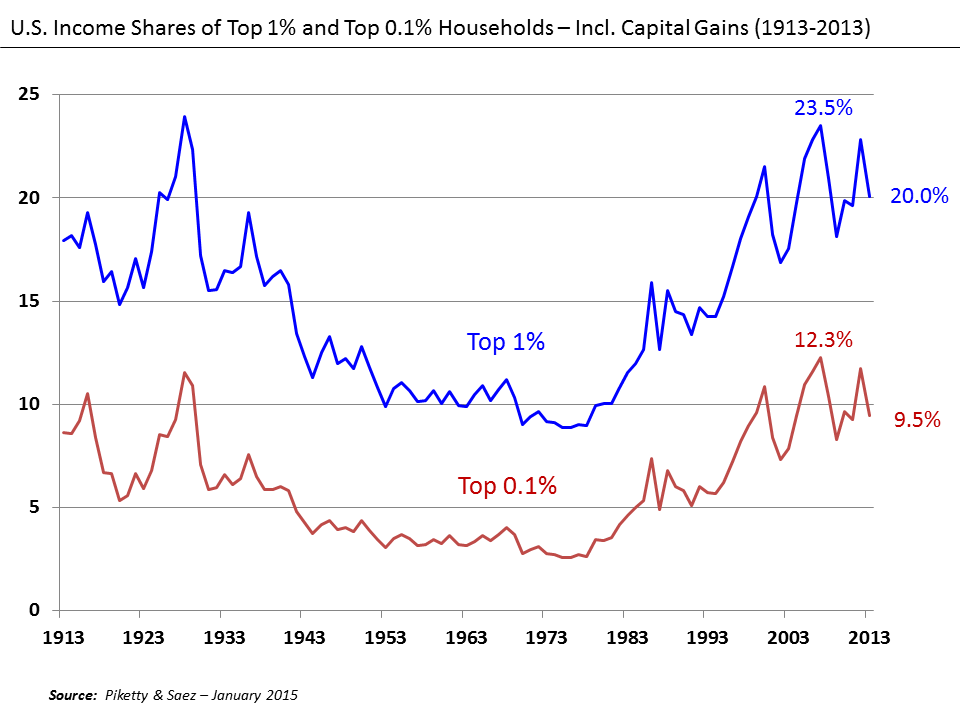
U.S. Income Shares of Top 1% and 0.1% 1913–2013

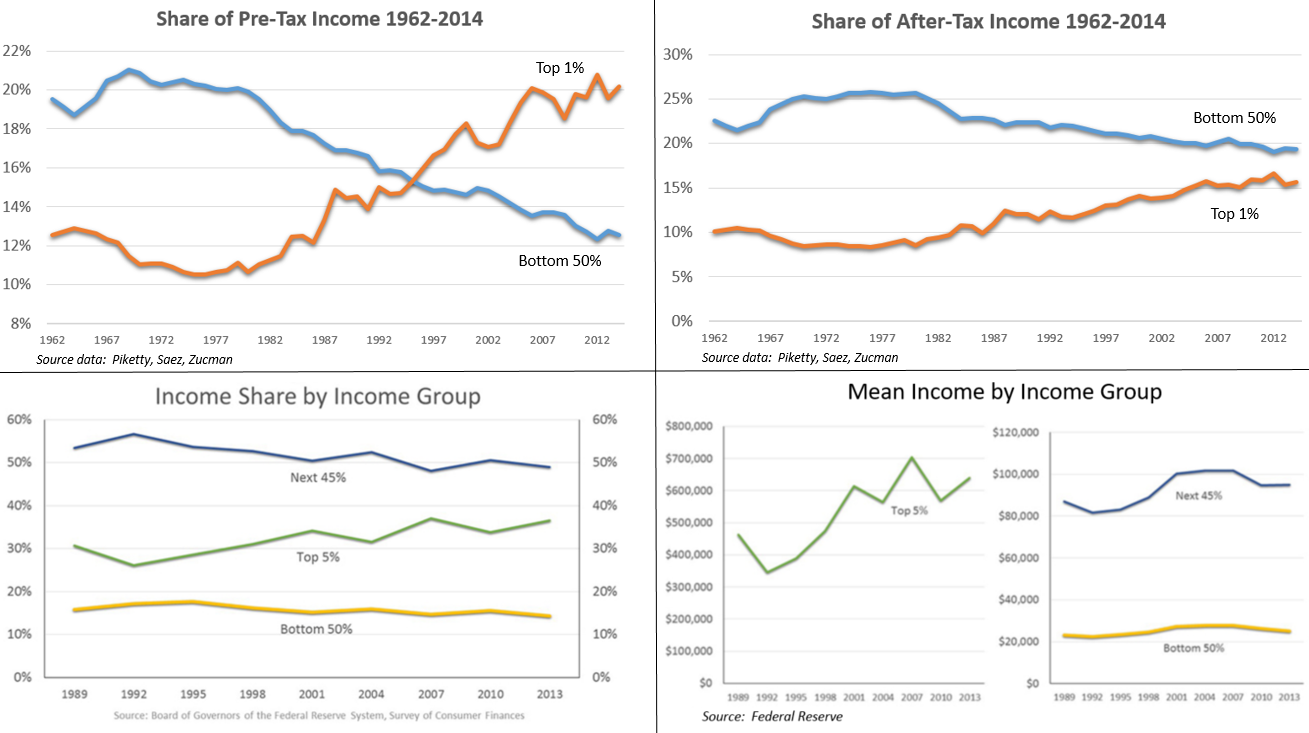
Income inequality panel – v1

=== Health spending ===
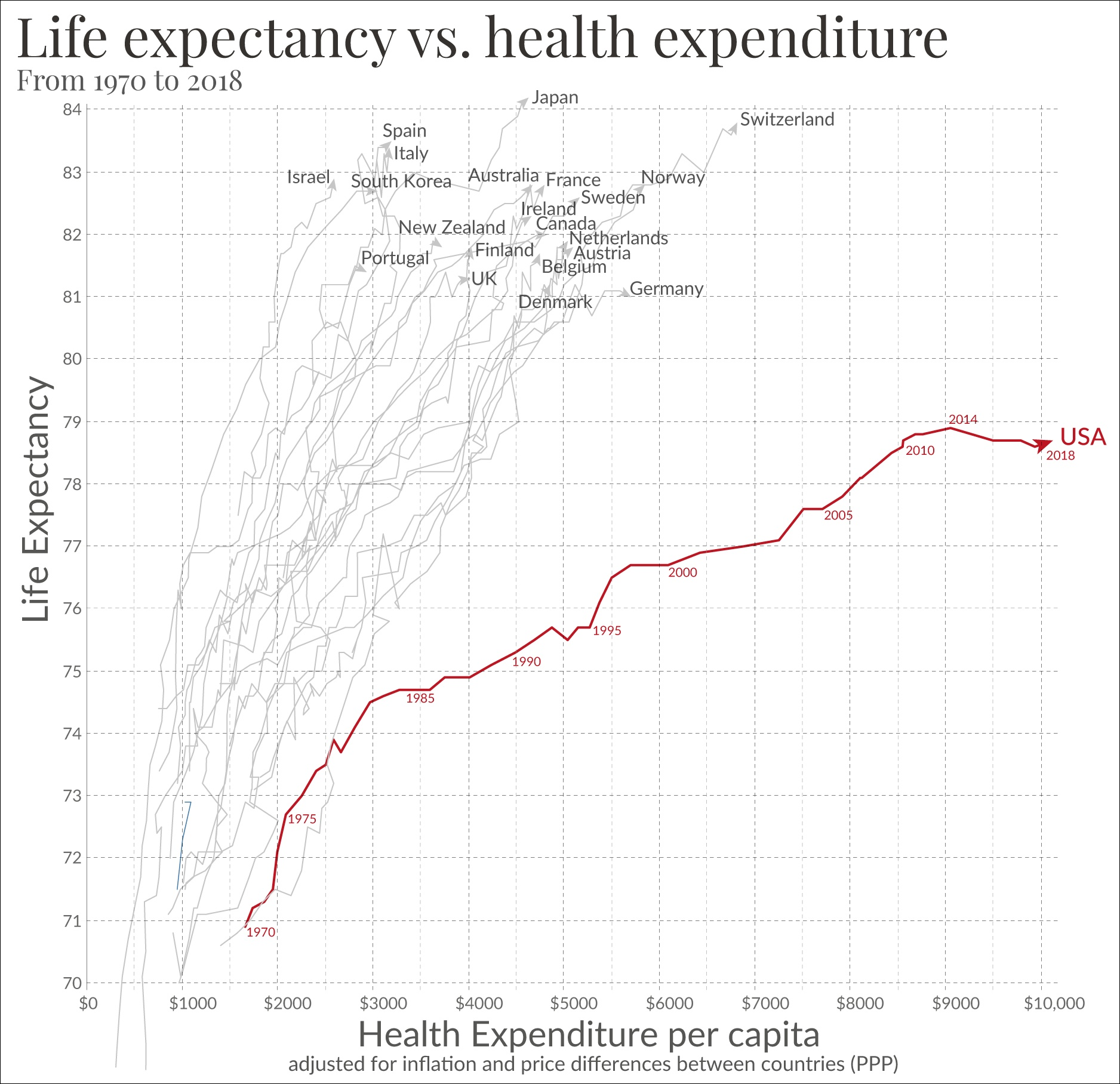
Life expectancy vs healthcare spending of rich OECD countries. US average of $10,447 in 2018.

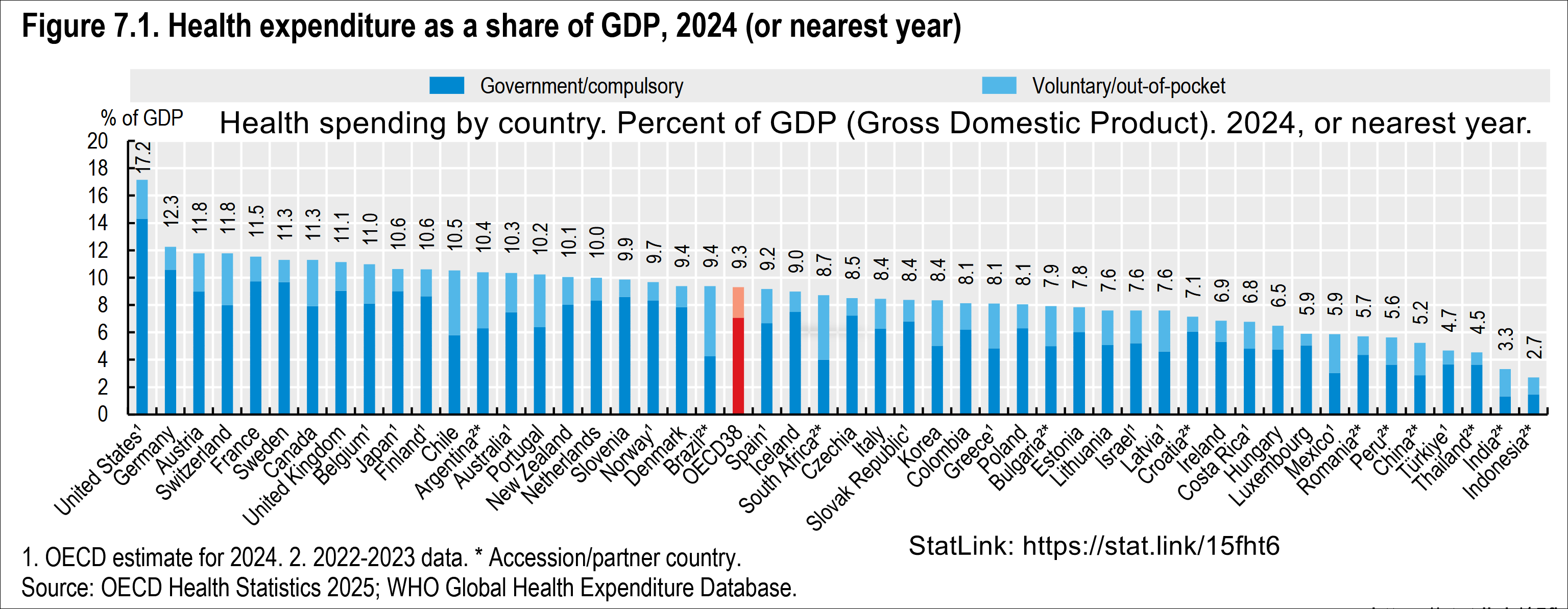
Health spending by country. Percent of GDP (Gross domestic product). For example: 11.2% for Canada in 2022. 16.6% for the United States in 2022.

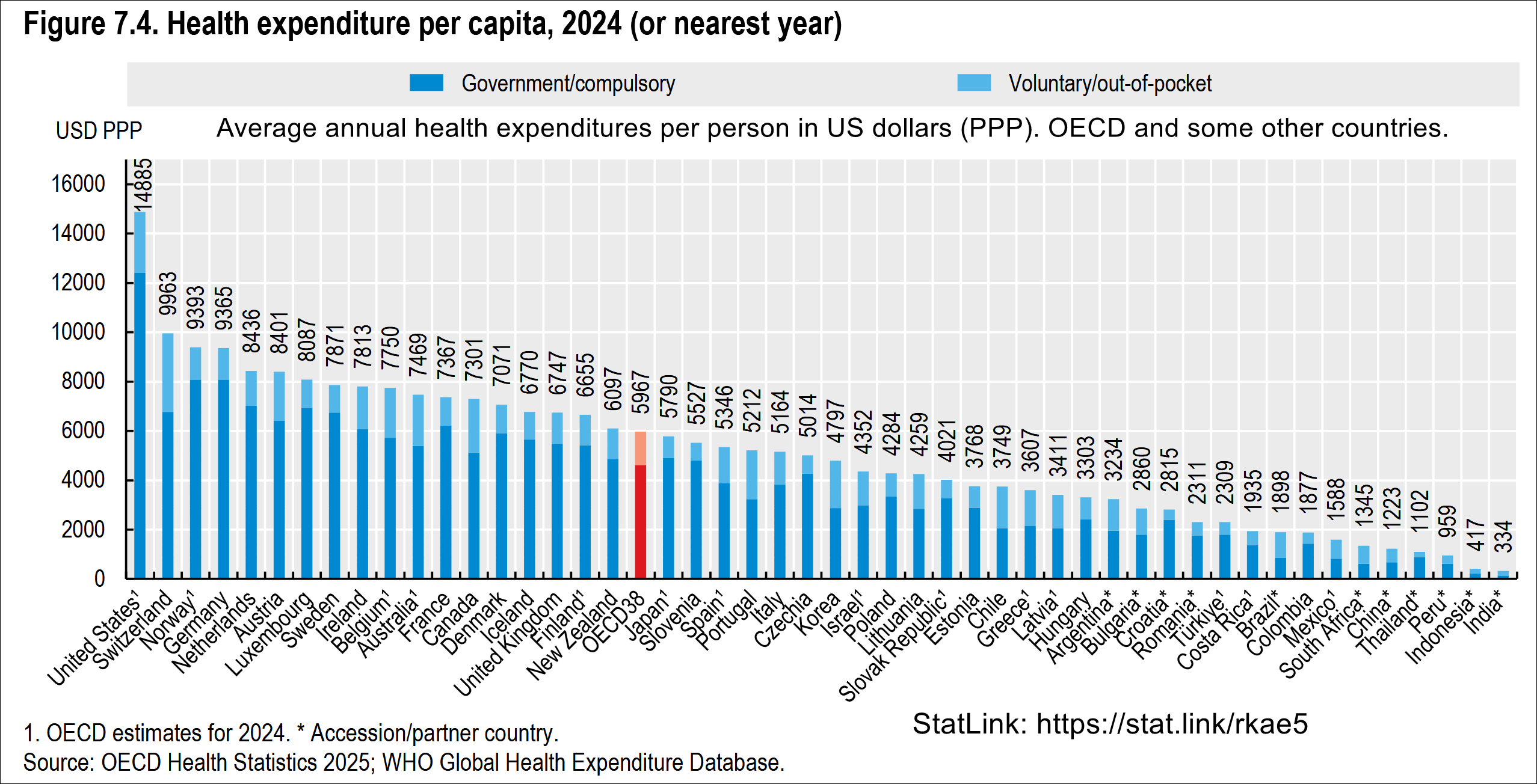
Total healthcare cost per person. Public and private spending. US dollars PPP. For example: $6,319 for Canada in 2022. $12,555 for the US in 2022.

=== Tariff rates ===
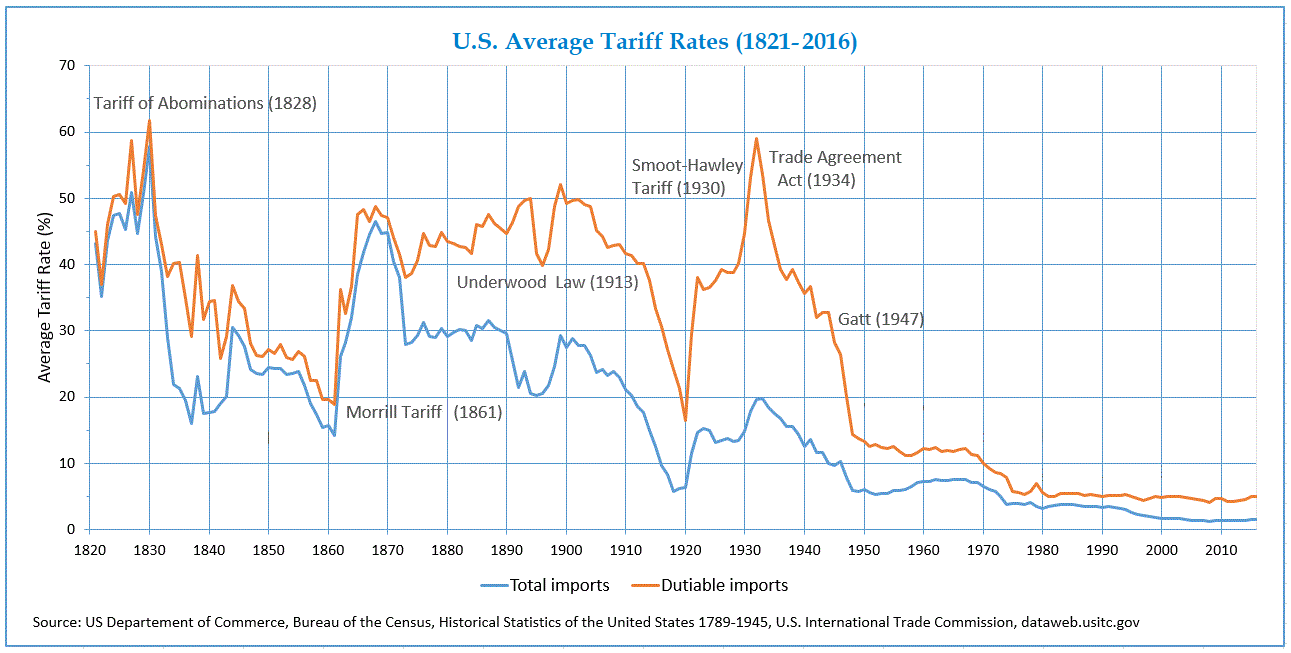
Average tariff rates in USA (1821–2016)

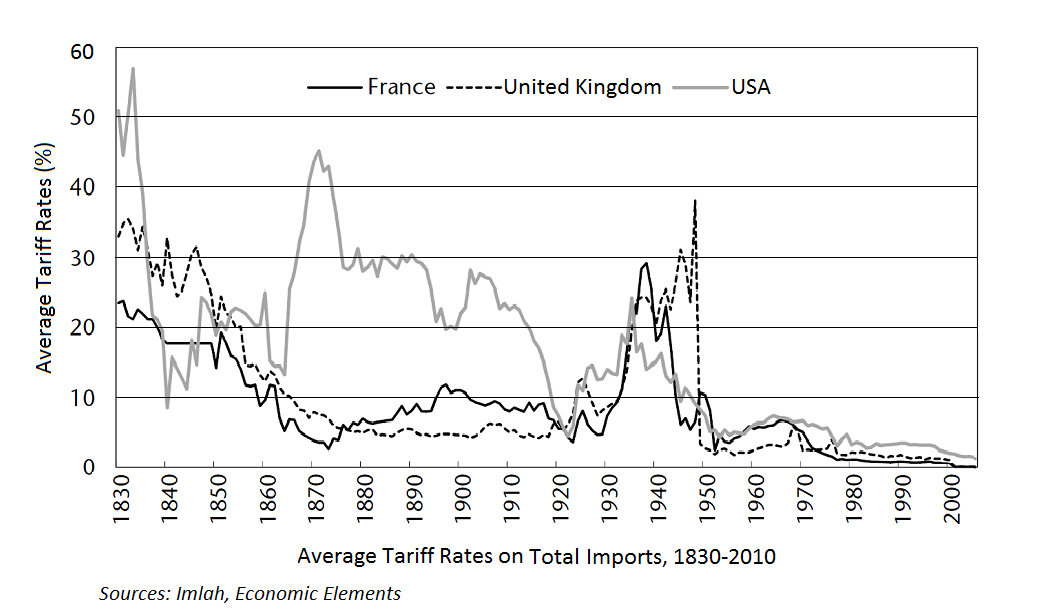
Average tariff rates (France, UK, US)

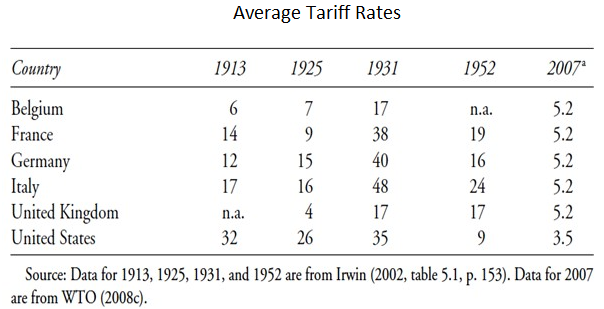
Average tariff rates for selected countries (1913–2007)

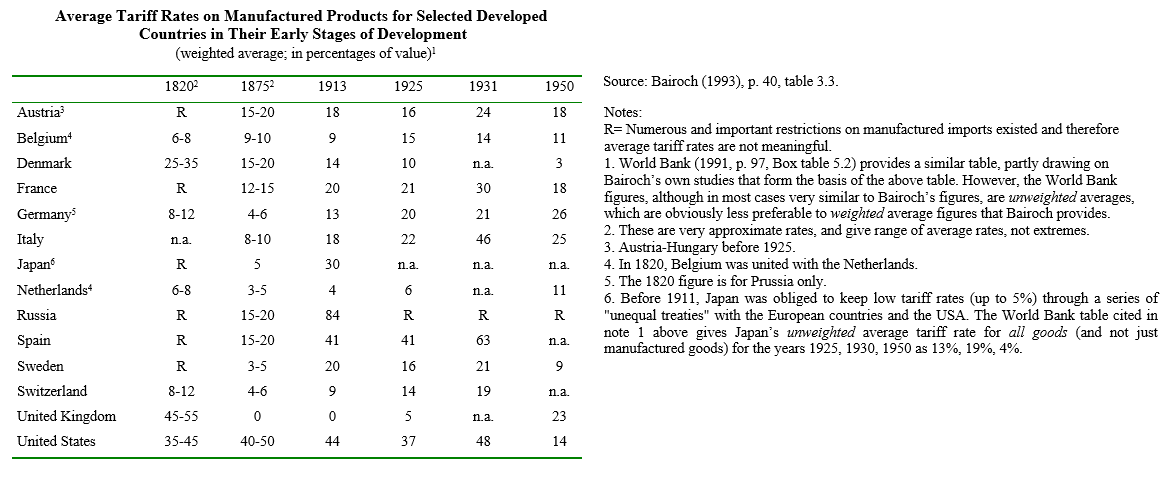
Average tariff rates on manufactured products

=== Trade balance ===
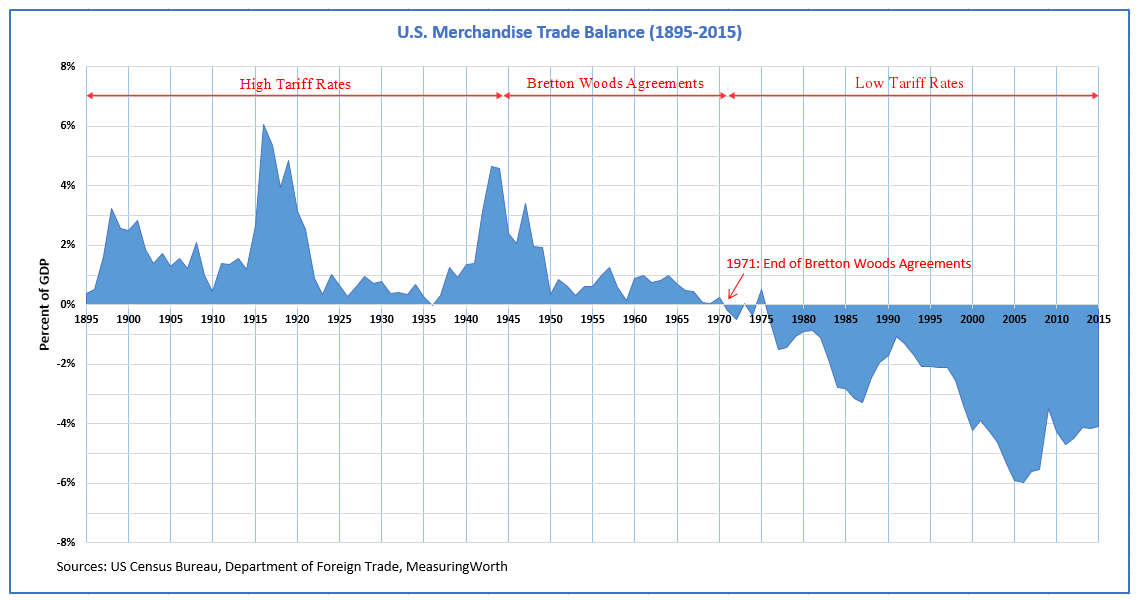
U.S. trade balance and trade policy (1895–2015)

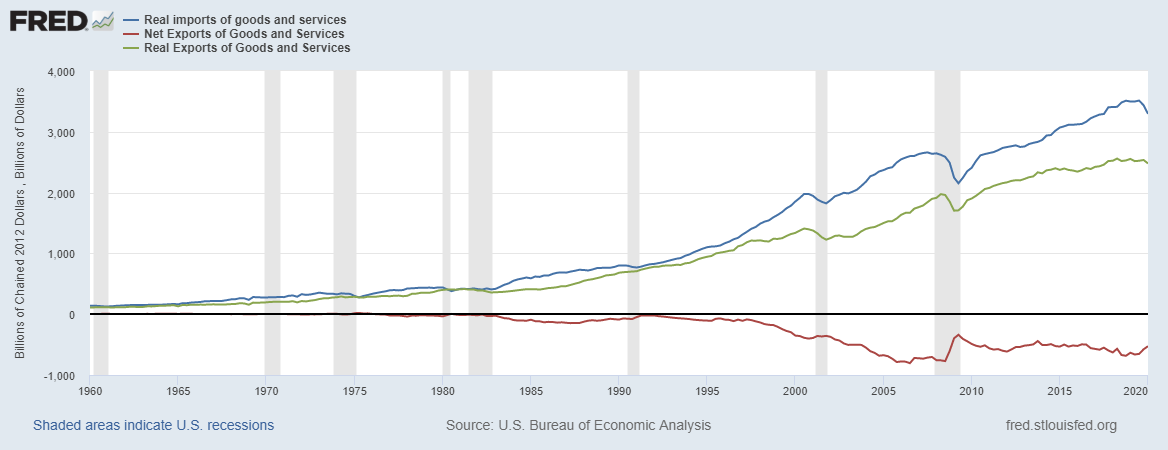
Imports vs exports & net imports

US trade balance (from 1960)

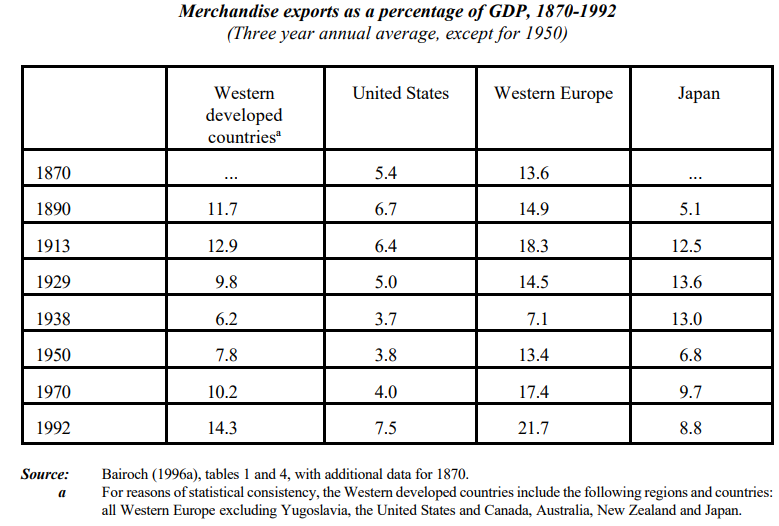
Merchandise exports (1870–1992)

=== Inflation ===
United States historical inflation rate since 1666.

=== Federal tax ===
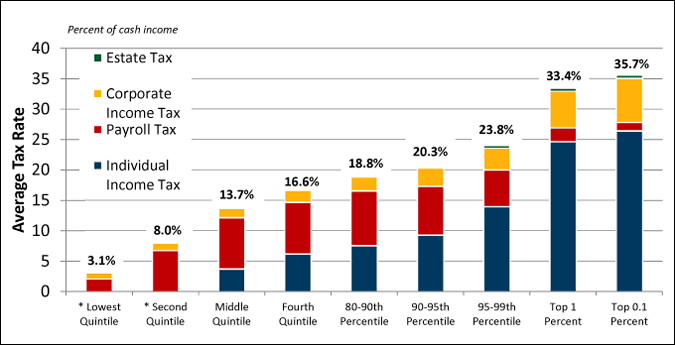
U.S. federal effective tax rates by income percentile and component as projected for 2014 by the Tax Policy Center.

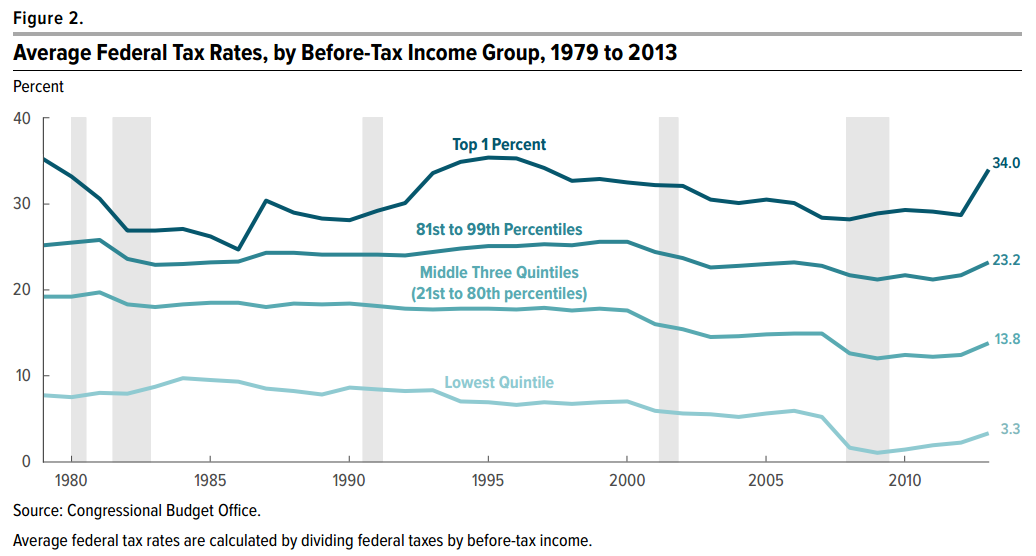
CBO estimates of historical effective federal tax rates broken down by income level.

=== Government spending ===
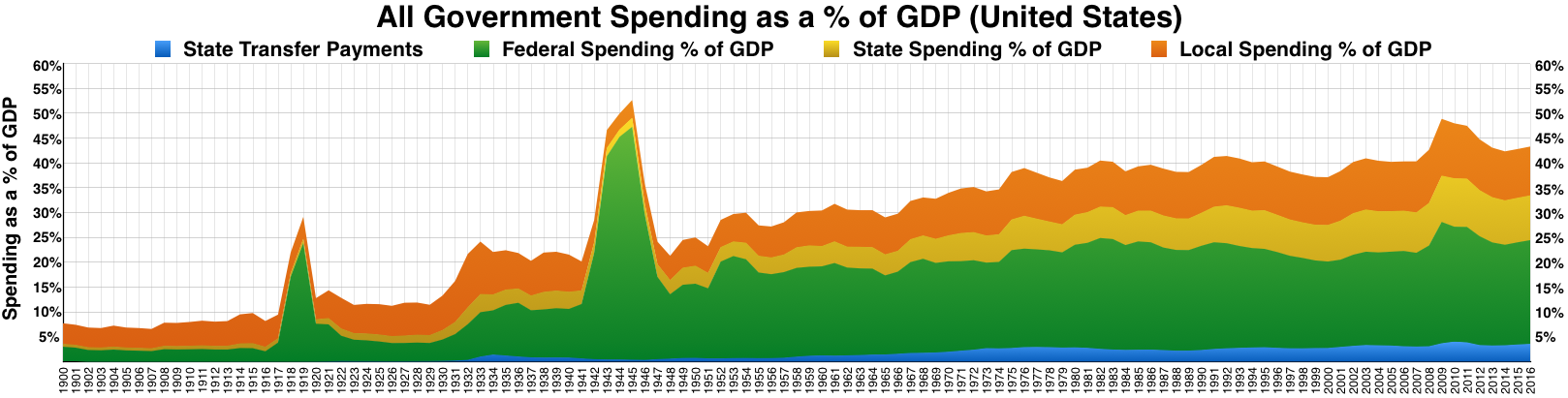
Federal, state, and local government spending as a % of GDP history

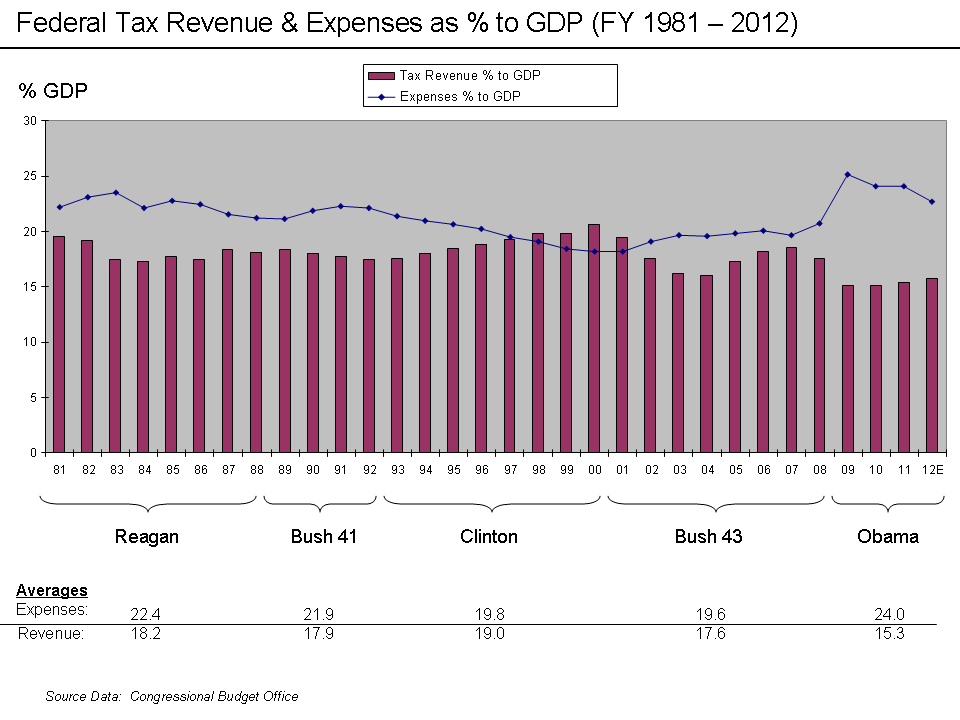
Revenue and expense as % GDP

Further information: List of countries with highest military expenditures

Military spending, top 25 countries by % GDP, 2024
Country	% GDP spent on military
Ukraine	34.5
Israel	8.8
Algeria	8.0
Saudi Arabia	7.3
Russia	7.1
Myanmar	6.8
Oman	5.6
Armenia	5.5
Azerbaijan	5.0
Kuwait	4.8
Jordan	4.8
Burkina Faso	4.7
Mali	4.2
Poland	4.2
Burundi	3.8
Brunei	3.6
Morocco	3.5
United States	3.4
Estonia	3.4
Colombia	3.4
Latvia	3.3
Greece	3.1
Lithuania	3.1
Chad	3.0
Kyrgyzstan	3.0

Military spending, top 25 countries by PPP, 2024
Country	$billions spent on military
United States	997
China	567
Russia	401
India	308
Ukraine	183
South Korea	96
Germany	99
Japan	91
France	91
United Kingdom	86
Brazil	64
Poland	62
Italy	60
Turkey	59
Indonesia	47
Colombia	43
Mexico	40
Spain	39
Australia	31
Canada	31
Netherlands	21
Philippines	21
Romania	21
Greece	17
Malaysia	14

=== Debt ===
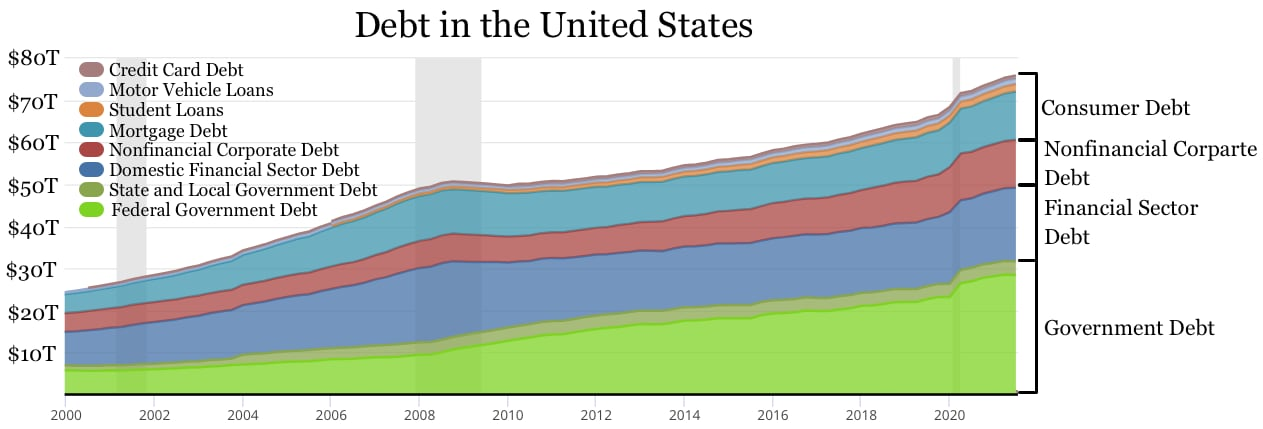
Debt in the United States

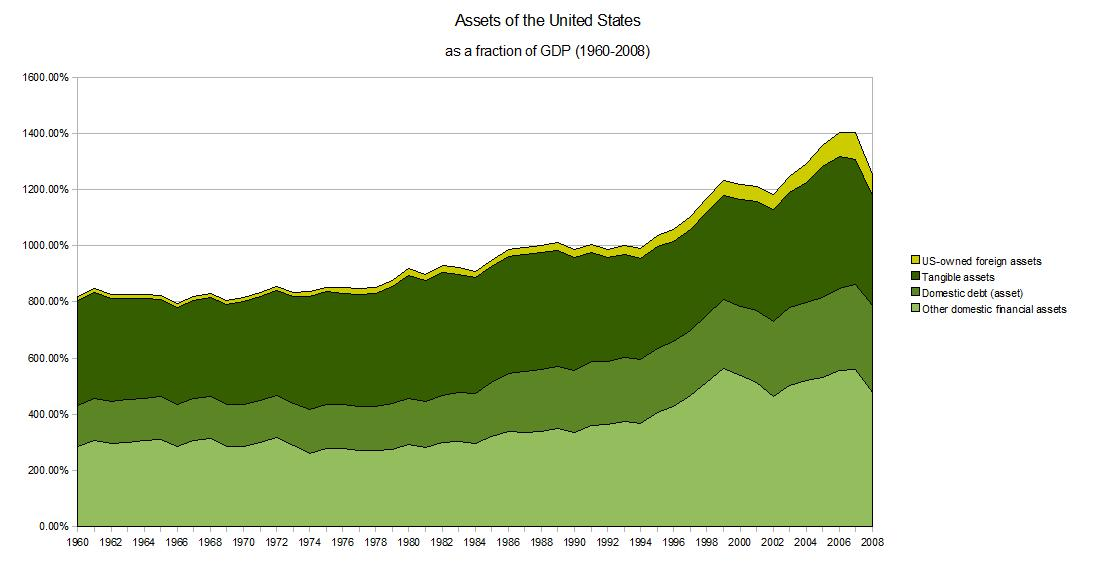
Assets of the United States as a fraction of GDP 1960–2008

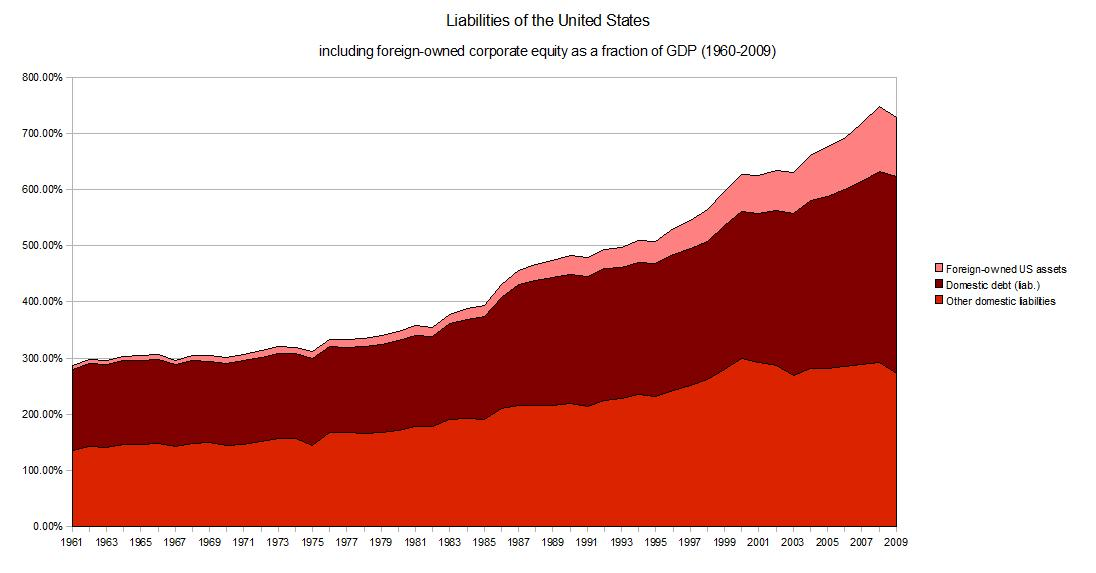
Liabilities of the United States as a fraction of GDP 1960–2009

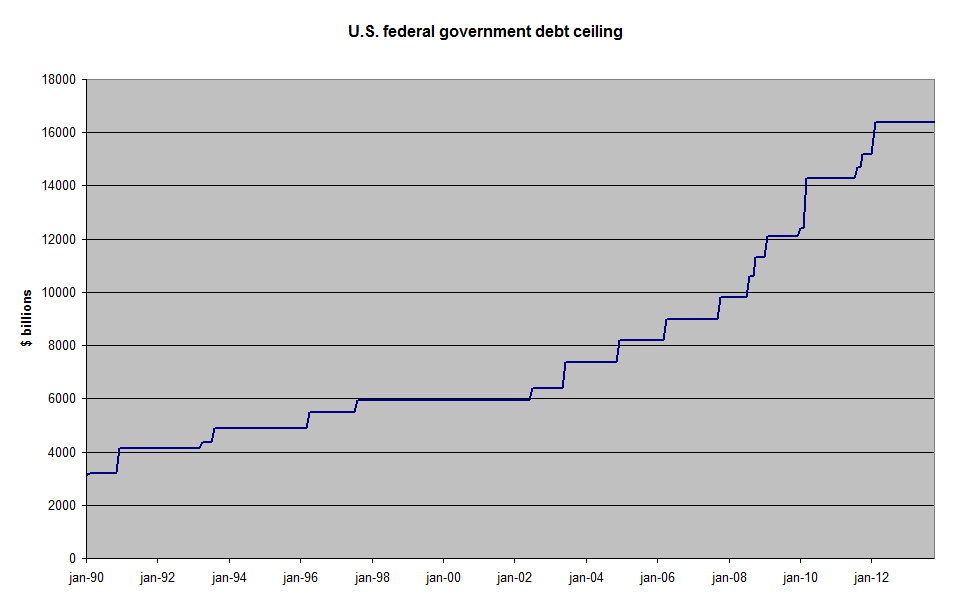
Development of U.S. federal government debt ceiling from 1990 to January 2012.

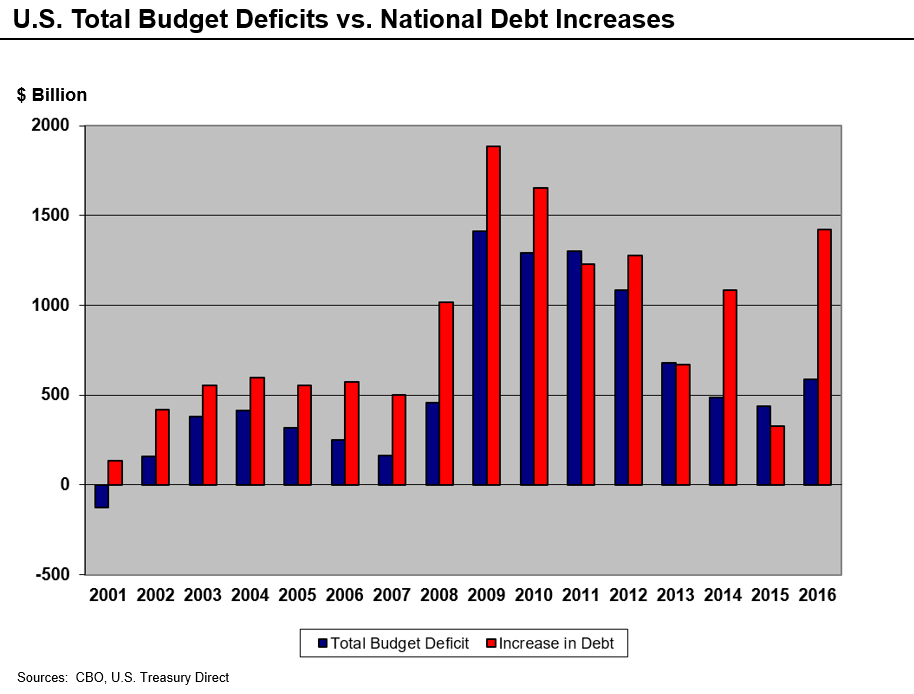
Deficit and debt increases 2001–2016.

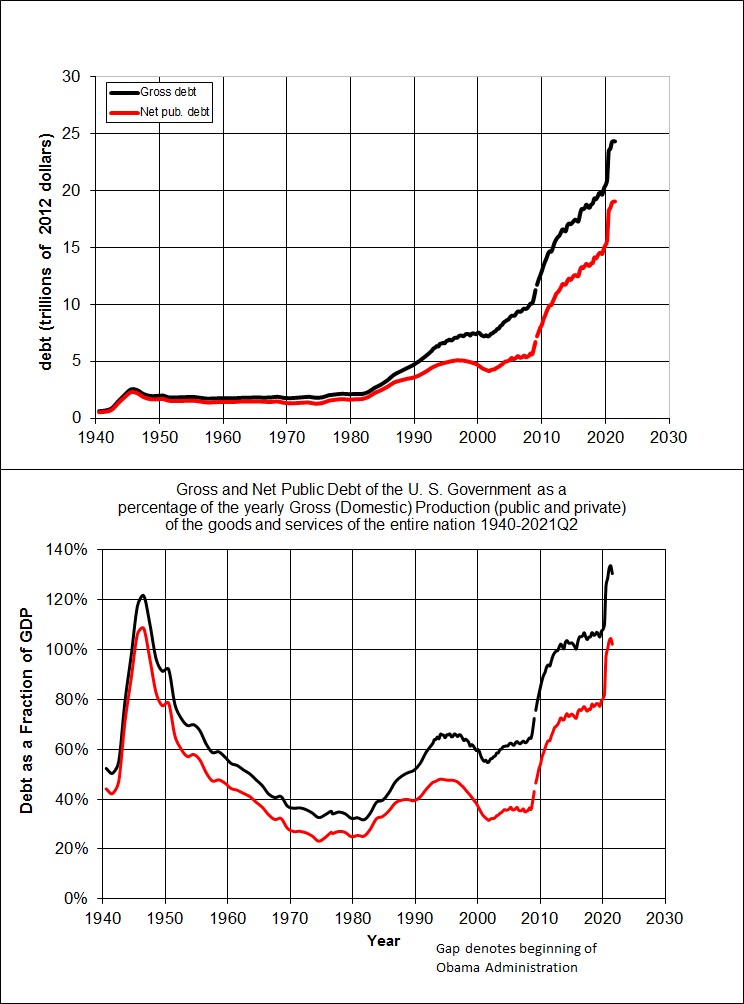
U.S. public net debt and the total public debt

=== Deficit ===
Annual federal deficit as a percent of GDP

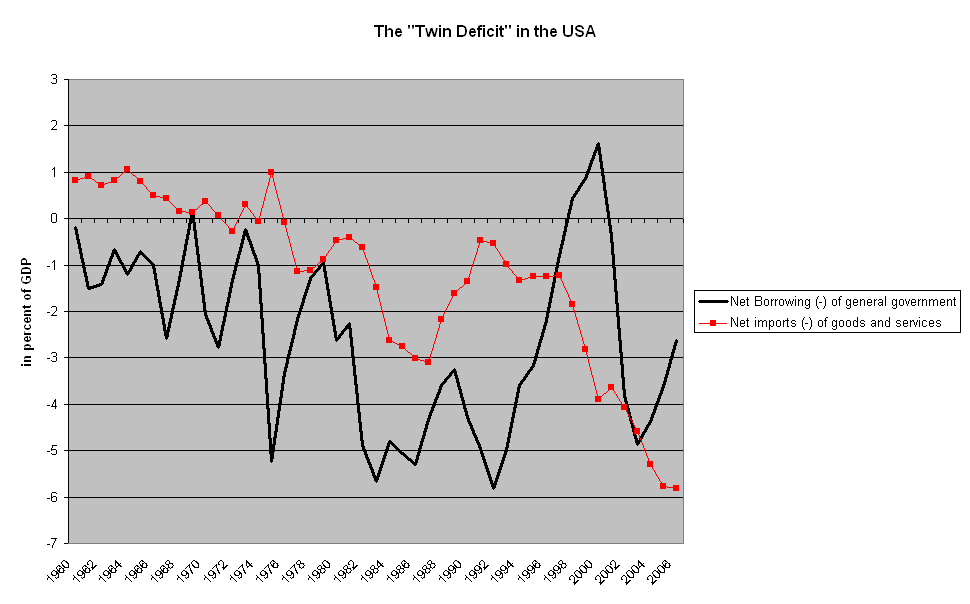
"Twin deficit" (1960–2006)

== See also ==
- History of agriculture in the United States
- Environmental history of the United States
- History of banking in the United States
- History of coal mining in the United States
- Tariff in United States history
- Wall Street's history
- U.S. economic performance by presidential party
- Rural American history
- American urban history

== Bibliography ==
- Atack, Jeremy; Passell, Peter (1994). A New Economic View of American History: From Colonial Times to 1940. New York: W.W. Norton and Co. ISBN 978-0-393-96315-1. 1st edition was Lee, Susan Previant, and Peter Passell. A New Economic View of American History (1979) online 1st edition
- Bridges, Mary. Dollars and Dominion: US Bankers and the Making of a Superpower (Princeton University Press), 1900 to 1940 online review of this book
- Browning, Andrew H. The Panic of 1819: The First Great Depression (2019); scholarly history excerpt
- Cain, Louis P., Price V. Fishback and Paul W. Rhode, eds. The Oxford Handbook of American Economic History (2 vol Oxford Up, 2018) 961 pp. online review
- Carson, Thomas, ed. Gale Encyclopedia of U.S. Economic History (1999)
- Cochran, Thomas C. 200 Years of American Business. (1977) online
- Davis, Lance, Jonathan R. T. Hughes and Duncan M. McDougall. American Economic History: The Development Of A National Economy (2012)
- DeLong, J. Bradford. Slouching Towards Utopia: An Economic History of the Twentieth Century (2022) global history with stress on USA.
- Dubofsky, Melvyn, and Foster Rhea Dulles. Labor in America: A History (2004) online older edition
- Engerman, Stanley L. and Robert E. Gallman, eds. The Cambridge Economic History of the United States (2000), cover 1790–1914; heavily quantitative
- Engerman, Stanley L.; Gallman, Robert E. (1996). The Cambridge Economic History of the United States: vol 1: The Colonial Era. Cambridge Up. ISBN 978-0-521-39442-0. online
- Faulkner, Harold U. The Decline of Laissez Faire, 1897–1917 (1951), broad survey of the era; online
- Faulkner, Harold U. Economic history of the United States (1937) online
- Fink, Leon. The long Gilded Age: American capitalism and the lessons of a new world order (University of Pennsylvania Press, 2014), short survey of late 19th century.
- French, Michael. US Economic History since 1945 (1997)
- Gordon, John Steele An Empire of Wealth: The Epic History of American Economic Power (2004), popular history
- Gordon, Robert J. (2016). The Rise and Fall of American Growth. Princeton, NJ USA: Princeton University Press. ISBN 978-0-691-14772-7.
- Hughes, Jonathan and Louis P. Cain. American Economic History (8th Edition) (2010), textbook
- Kirkland; Edward C. Industry Comes of Age: Business, Labor and Public Policy, 1860–1897 (1961), survey of era
- Kirkland; Edward C. A History of American Economic Life (1951), online
- Lind, Michael. Land Of Promise: An Economic History of the United States (Harper, 2012).
- McCusker, John J. and Russell R. Menard. The Economy of British America, 1607–1789 (1991)
- Matson, Cathy, ed. The Economy of Early America: Historical Perspectives and New Directions (2006) excerpt and text search
- Meyer, Balthasar Henry, and Caroline Elizabeth MacGill. History of Transportation in the United States before 1860 (1917). online
- Mitchell, Broadus. The Depression Decade: From New Era through New Deal, 1929–1941 (1947) online
- Mokyr, Joel, ed. The Oxford Encyclopedia of Economic History (5 vol. 2003), worldwide coverage by experts text search
- Morris, Charles R. A Rabble of Dead Money: The Great Crash and the Global Depression: 1929–1939 (PublicAffairs, 2017), 389 pp. online review
- Myers, Margaret G. Financial History of the United States (1970). online
- Nettels, Curtis P. Roots of American Civilization (1938), strong on colonial economics online
- Porter, Glen. Encyclopedia of American Economic History: Studies of the Principal Movements and Ideas (3 vol 1980)
- Rasmussen, Wayne D., ed. Agriculture in the United States: a documentary history (4 vol, Random House, 1975) 3661pp. vol 4 online; primary sources
- Richardson, Heather Cox. The Greatest Nation of the Earth: Republican Economic Policies during the Civil War (1997)
- Rosenberg, Nathan Inside the Black Box: Technology and Economics (1982)
- Schapsmeier, Edward L; and Frederick H. Schapsmeier. Encyclopedia of American agricultural history (1975) online
- Shachtman, Tom. The Founding Fortunes: How the Wealthy Paid for and Profited from America's Revolution (St. Martin's Press, 2020) popular economic history covers 1763 and 1813; online review
- Schmidt, Louis Bernard, and Earle Dudley Ross, eds. Readings in the economic history of American agriculture (Macmillan, 1925) excerpts from scholarly studies, colonial era to 1920s. online.
- Sellers, Charles, The Market Revolution: Jacksonian America, 1815–1846 (1994) excerpt
- Siegler, Mark V. An Economic History of the United States: Connecting the Present with the Past (Macmillan, 2017), textbook with a topical approach excerpt
- Soule, George. The Prosperity Decade: From War to Depression, 1917–1929 (1947) broad economic history of decade; online
- Taylor, George Rogers. The Transportation Revolution 1815–1860 (1962) broad economic history of the era; online
- Temin, Peter. The Jacksonian Economy (1969)
- Walker, John F. and Harold G. Vatter. History of US Economy Since World War II (1996) non technical articles by experts. online
- Walton, Gary M. and Hugh Rockoff. History of the American Economy with Economic Applications (2012), textbook
- Whaples, Robert and Dianne C. Betts, eds. Historical Perspectives on the American Economy: Selected Readings (1995) articles
- Woytinsky, V.S. World Population and Production: Trends and Outlook (1953). 1268 pp, tables, maps, analysis covering most industrial powers, 1800–1950; US is heavily represented; online
- Woytinsky, Emma S. Profile of the U.S. economy; a survey of growth and change (1967) online
- This article contains public domain text from the United States Department of State from "State.gov". Archived from the original on August 31, 2006.

== Special studies ==
- Chandler, Alfred D. and James W. Cortada. A Nation Transformed by Information: How Information Has Shaped the United States from Colonial Times to the Present
- Chernow, Ron. The house of Morgan: an American banking dynasty and the rise of modern finance (2001).
- Folsom, Burt, et al. The Myth of the Robber Barons (2010)
- Gaspar, Vitor. "The making of a continental financial system: Lessons for Europe from early American history". Journal of European Integration 37.7 (2015): 847–859, summarizes Hamilton's achievements in Atlantic perspective.
- Goldin, Claudia Understanding the Gender Gap: An Economic History of American Women (1990), quantitative
- Gordon, Robert J. (1999). "U.S. Economic Growth since 1870: One Big Wave?". The American Economic Review. 89 (2): 123–128. doi:10.1257/aer.89.2.123. ISSN 0002-8282. JSTOR 117092.
- Gordon, Robert. The Rise and Fall of American Growth: The U.S. Standard of Living since the Civil War (2016), Comprehensive coverage by leading scholar.
- Klebaner, Benjamin J. American commercial banking: A history (Twayne, 1990). online
- La Barca, Giuseppe. International Trade under President Reagan: US Trade Policy in the 1980s (Bloomsbury, 2023). ISBN 978-1-350-27141-8
- Lindert, Peter H. and Jeffrey G. Williamson. Unequal Gains: American Growth and Inequality since 1700 (2016)
- Link, Stefan J. Forging Global Fordism: Nazi Germany, Soviet Russia, and the Contest over the Industrial Order (2020) excerpt
- Mason, David L. From buildings and loans to bail-outs: A history of the American savings and loan industry, 1831–1995 (Cambridge University Press, 2004).
- Misa, Thomas J. A Nation of Steel: The Making of Modern America, 1865–1925 (1995) chapter 1 online, on steel industry
- Morris, Charles R. The Tycoons: How Andrew Carnegie, John D. Rockefeller, Jay Gould, and J. P. Morgan Invented the American Supereconomy (2005)
- Morris, Charles R. A Rabble of Dead Money: The Great Crash and the Global Depression: 1929–1939 (2017)
- Murphy, Sharon Ann. Other People's Money: How Banking Worked in the Early American Republic (2017) online review
- Ransom, Roger. Conflict and Compromise: The Political Economy of Slavery, Emancipation and the American Civil War (1989)
- Schweikart, Larry, ed. Banking and Finance to 1913 (1990); Banking and Finance, 1913–1989 (2 vol 1990), an encyclopedia with short articles by experts
- Wright, Gavin. Old South, New South: Revolutions in the Southern Economy since the Civil War (1986)
- Wright, Gavin. The Political Economy of the Cotton South: Households, Markets, and Wealth in the Nineteenth Century (1978)
- Wright, Robert E. and David J. Cowen. Financial Founding Fathers: The Men Who Made America Rich, University of Chicago Press, 2006. ISBN 0-226-91068-7.
- Yarrow, Andrew L. "The big postwar story: Abundance and the rise of economic journalism". Journalism History 32.2 (2006): 58+ online

== Sources for economic data ==
- Bureau of the Census, Historical Statistics of the United States: Colonial Times to 1970 (1976) part 1 online; part 2 online; volumes 1 and 2
- Carter, Susan B. et al. eds. The Historical Statistics of the United States (6 vol: Cambridge UP, 2006); huge compilation of statistical data; online
- Council of Economic Advisors, Economic Report of the President (annual 1947– ), complete series online; important analysis of current trends and policies, plus statistical tables
- Bureau of Economic Analysis: Official United States GDP data
- Annual Report of the Secretary of the Treasury on the State of the Finances, 1789–1980
- Annual Report of the Comptroller of the Currency, 1863–1980
- Annual Report of the Board of Governors of the Federal Reserve System
- 75 Years of American Finance, a graphic presentation of American financial history from 1861 through 1938
- Statistical Abstract of the United States
- Long Term Economic Growth – 1860–1965: A Statistical Compendium
- Business Booms and Depressions since 1775, a chart of the past trend of price inflation, federal debt, business, national income, stocks and bond yields for the United States from 1775 to 1943.
- Budget of the United States Government
