= Starve the beast =

Political strategy utilized by American conservatives

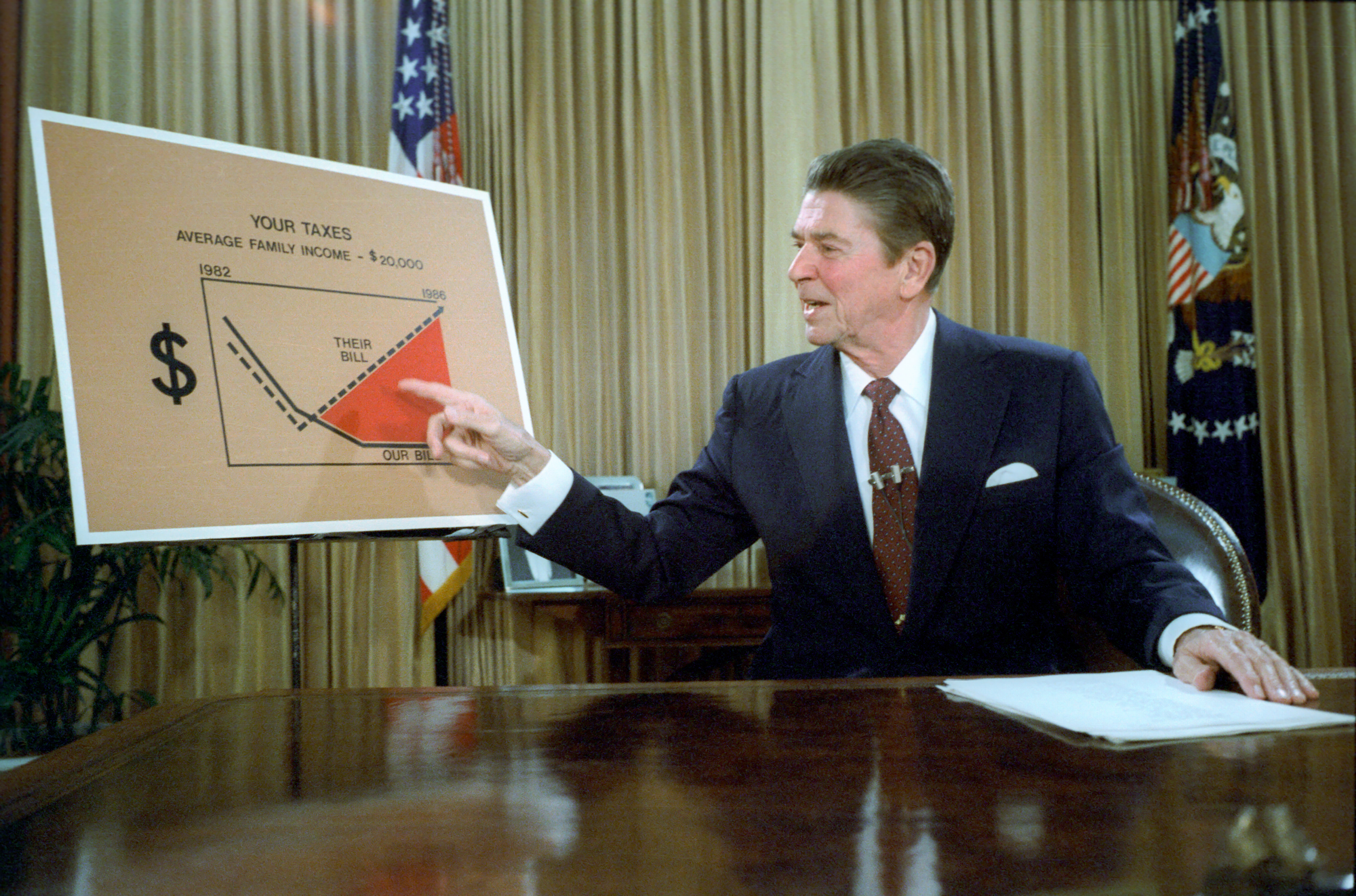
On July 27, 1981, Ronald Reagan gave a televised address from the Oval Office, outlining his plan for tax cuts.

"Starve the beast" is a political strategy employed by American conservatives to limit government spending by cutting taxes, to deprive the federal government of revenue in a deliberate effort to force it to reduce spending. The term "the beast", in this context, refers to the United States federal government and the programs it funds, primarily with American tax money, particularly social programs such as education, welfare, Social Security, Medicare, and Medicaid.

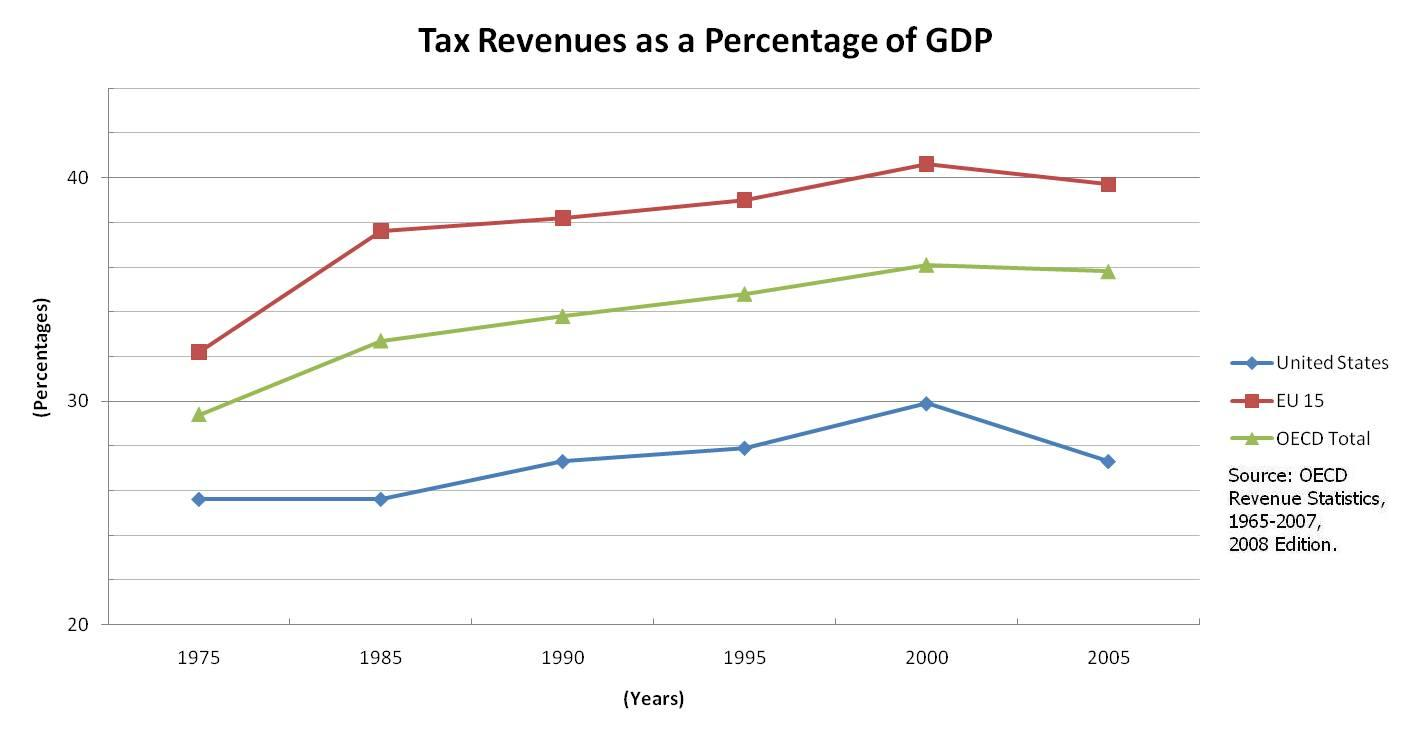
Total tax revenues were calculated as a percentage of GDP for the U.S. in comparison to the OECD and the EU 15.

On July 14, 1978, economist and future Federal Reserve chairman Alan Greenspan testified to the Senate Finance Committee: "Let us remember that the basic purpose of any tax cut program in today's environment is to reduce the momentum of expenditure growth by restraining the amount of revenue available and trust that there is a political limit to deficit spending."

Before his election as President, then-candidate Ronald Reagan foreshadowed the strategy during the 1980 US Presidential debates, saying "John Anderson tells us that first we've got to reduce spending before we can reduce taxes. Well, if you've got a kid that's extravagant, you can lecture him all you want to about his extravagance. Or you can cut his allowance and achieve the same end much quicker."

== Since 2000 ==
The tax cuts and deficit spending of former US President George W. Bush's administration were attempts to "starve the beast". Bush said in 2001: "so we have the tax relief plan [...] that now provides a new kind—a fiscal straightjacket [sic] for Congress. And that's good for the taxpayers, and it's incredibly positive news if you're worried about a federal government that has been growing at a dramatic pace over the past eight years and it has been."

Republican presidential candidate Fred Thompson's tax-cut plan, incorporating a flat tax, also deferred paying for the larger deficits it would create. It "would most likely be funded by lower government spending on Social Security and Medicare benefits", according to the Wall Street Journal.

Political activist Grover Norquist authored an oath, the so-called "Taxpayer Protection Pledge", that 279 Senators and Congressman have signed. The oath states the signatories will never vote to raise taxes on anyone under any circumstances. It is viewed by some of the unsigned as a stumbling block to mutual fiscal negotiations to benefit the country.

== Economic analysis ==
James M. Buchanan, a Nobel Prize-winning economist, helped develop the fiscal illusion hypothesis: "It's obvious, borrowing allows spending to be made that will yield immediate political payoffs without the incurring of any immediate political cost." In their book Democracy in Deficit (1977), Buchanan and Richard E. Wagner suggest that the complicated nature of the U.S. tax system causes fiscal illusion and results in greater public expenditure than would be the case in an idealized system in which everyone is aware in detail of what their share of the costs of government is.

Empirical evidence shows that Starve the Beast may be counterproductive, with lower taxes actually corresponding to higher spending. An October 2007 study by Christina D. Romer and David H. Romer of the National Bureau of Economic Research found: "[...] no support for the hypothesis that tax cuts restrain government spending; indeed, [the findings] suggest that tax cuts may actually increase spending. The results also indicate that the main effect of tax cuts on the government budget is to induce subsequent legislated tax increases."

William Niskanen, chairman emeritus of the libertarian Cato Institute, criticized "starve the beast". According to Niskanen, if deficits finance 20% of government spending, then citizens perceive government services as discounted; services that are popular at 20% off the listed price would be less popular at full price. He hypothesized that higher revenues could constrain spending, and found strong statistical support for that conjecture based on data from 1981 to 2005. Another Cato researcher, Michael New, tested Niskanen's model in different time periods and using a more restrictive definition of spending (non-defense discretionary spending) and arrived at a similar conclusion.

Professor Leonard E. Burman of Syracuse University testified to a U.S. Senate committee in July 2010 that: "My guess is that if President Bush had announced a new war surtax to pay for Iraq or an increase in the Medicare payroll tax rate to pay for the prescription drug benefit, both initiatives would have been less popular. Given that the prescription drug benefit only passed Congress by one vote after an extraordinary amount of arm-twisting, it seems unlikely that it would have passed at all if accompanied by a tax increase. Starve the beast doesn't work."

Economist Paul Krugman summarized: "Rather than proposing unpopular spending cuts, Republicans would push through popular tax cuts, with the deliberate intention of worsening the government's fiscal position. Spending cuts could then be sold as a necessity rather than a choice, the only way to eliminate an unsustainable budget deficit." He wrote that the "beast is starving, as planned" and that "Republicans insist that the deficit must be eliminated, but they're not willing either to raise taxes or to support cuts in any major government programs. And they're not willing to participate in serious bipartisan discussions, either, because that might force them to explain their plan—and there isn't any plan, except to regain power."

Historian Bruce Bartlett, former domestic policy adviser to President Ronald Reagan, referred to "starve the beast" as "the most pernicious fiscal doctrine in history", and blames it for the increase in US government debt since the 1980s.

== Political advocacy ==
Former U.S. Senator Jon Kyl (R-AZ), a veteran of the Senate Finance Committee, stated "you should never have to offset the cost of a deliberate decision to reduce tax rates on Americans."

Lobbyist Grover Norquist is a well-known proponent of the strategy and has famously said, "My goal is to cut government in half in twenty-five years, to get it down to the size where we can drown it in the bathtub."

=== "Feed the beast" ===
A related idea known as "Feed the beast", refers to increasing taxes for the purported purpose of balancing the budget only to make the government spend those inflows. Writer Stephen Moore and economist Richard Vedder have written in the Wall Street Journal that every new dollar of new taxes leads to more than one dollar of new spending according to their research. In an op-ed, they both stated that "[t]he grand bargain so many in Washington yearn for—tax increases coupled with spending cuts—is a fool's errand [because] higher tax collections never resulted in less spending". Their conclusions have been disputed by economist and writer Bruce Bartlett in The Fiscal Times, who stated that tax increases in the early 1990s helped contribute to more austere budgets in the late 1990s.

== See also ==
- Financial position of the United States
- National debt of the United States
- Reaganomics
- Tax resistance
- Taxation in the United States
- Two Santa Claus Theory
