= Fiscal =

Fiscal usually refers to government finance. In this context, it may refer to:

== Economics ==
- Fiscal policy, use of government expenditure to influence economic development
- Fiscal policy debate
- Fiscal adjustment, a reduction in the government primary budget deficit
- Fiscal agent, a proxy that manages fiscal matters on behalf of another party
- Fiscal illusion, a public choice theory of government expenditure
- Fiscal space, the flexibility of a government in its spending choices
- Fiscal sponsorship, when non-profit organizations offer their legal and tax-exempt status to groups
- Fiscal sustainability, the ability of a government to sustain its current spending
- Fiscal transparency, publication of information on how governments manage public resources
- Fiscal year, reporting periods for firms and other agencies

== Places ==
- Fiscal Parish, in Portugal
- Fiscal, Spain municipality in Huesca, Spain

== Other ==
- Fiscal Studies, a quarterly peer-reviewed academic journal
- Fiscal cancel, a cancellation on a stamp
- Fiscal fine, a form of deferred prosecution agreement in Scotland
- Fiscal of Colombo, a predecessor to the Inspector General of Police
- Deputy Fiscal, an officer of a District Court, Small Claims Court or Magistrates’ Court in Sri Lanka
- Procurator fiscal, a public prosecutor in Scotland
- Fiscal flycatcher, a small passerine bird in the Old World flycatcher family
- Fiscal (bird), some African species of the shrike genus Lanius
- Fiscal metering in oil & gas, to mean custody transfer

== See also ==
- Fiscal Responsibility Act (disambiguation)
