= Cebula =

Cebula is a Polish surname meaning "onion". Notable people with the surname include:

- Anne Cebula (born 1998), American épée fencer and model
- Erin Cebula, Canadian television personality
- Ewald Cebula (1917–2004), Polish football player and manager
- Józef Cebula (1902–1941), Polish priest
- Marcin Cebula (born 1995), Polish footballer
- Marek Cebula (born 1965), Polish politician, entrepreneur, and local government official
- Richard J. Cebula, economist and academic
- Tomasz Cebula (born 1966), Polish footballer
