= Richard Vedder =

American economist

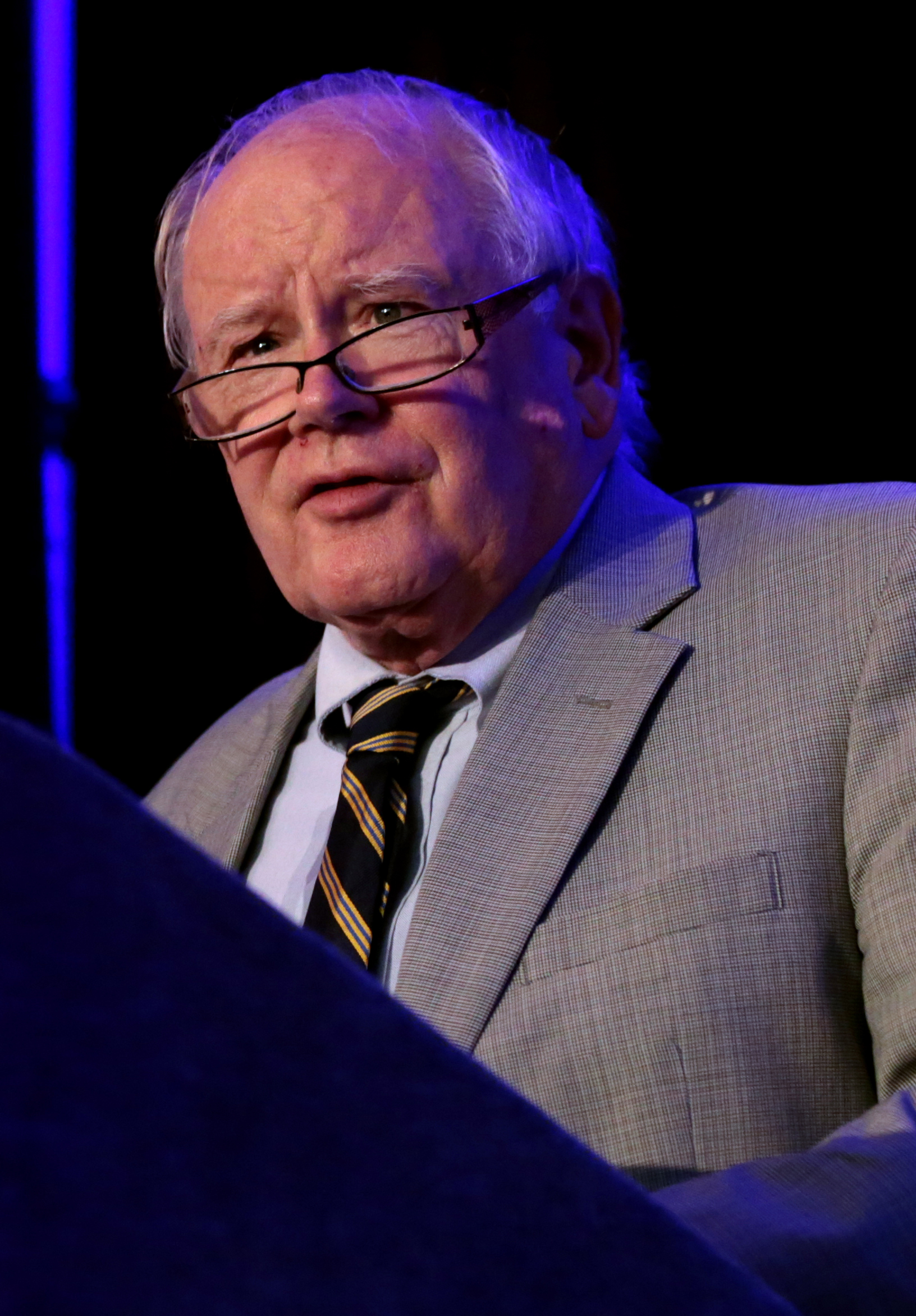
- Vedder in July 2017
- Born: November 5, 1940 (age 85)
- Education: University of Illinois
- Occupations: Author, historian, professor, columnist, policy scholar

Richard K. Vedder (born November 5, 1940) is an American economist, historian, author, and columnist. He is a professor emeritus of economics at Ohio University and senior fellow at The Independent Institute.

== Biography ==
Vedder was born on November 5, 1940. He earned his bachelor's in economics in 1962 from Northwestern University in 1962 and his Ph.D in economics from the University of Illinois in 1965. He has since studied U.S. economic history, particularly as it relates to public policy. Some of his research has involved American immigration, economic issues in American education, and the interrelationship between labor and capital markets.

Vedder serves as an adjunct scholar at the American Enterprise Institute (AEI), a think tank known for mostly libertarian and conservative perspectives. He has served as an economist with Congress' Joint Economic Committee. In his role with the AEI, he later testified before the Committee on October 30, 2008. He is also director of the Center for College Affordability and Productivity in Washington, D.C.

== Public commentary ==
=== Higher education ===
Vedder wrote in his June 2004 book Going Broke by Degree: Why College Costs Too Much that American universities have become less productive and less efficient in recent years as well as more likely to shift funds away their core mission of teaching. He also criticized rising tuition costs. He proposed as a broad solution moving state universities toward free market competition and privatization. He specifically recommended as well that colleges expand distance learning, cut out non-educational programs, modify tenure, raise teaching loads, and reduce administrative staffs.

On May 27, 2011, Vedder appeared on the news/public affairs TV program PBS NewsHour and stated that since "the cost of college is rising relative to the benefits of college," but "learning outcomes are stagnant or falling in this country," American society must "open up opportunities for people to consider a variety of different options after high school, one of which is college, but there are many others." Vedder also stated that "as many as one out of three college graduates today are in jobs that previously or historically have been filled by people with lesser educations, jobs that do not require higher-level learning skills, critical thinking skills, or writing skills or anything of that nature."

=== Government spending ===
Vedder and writer Stephen Moore wrote in the Wall Street Journal editorial page in March 2011 that every new dollar of new taxes leads to more than one dollar of new spending according to their research. Thus, they found evidence in favor of the "Feed the Beast" theory: that increasing taxes for the purported purpose of balancing the budget leads only to the government spending such inflows.

=== U.S. bailout ===
After the 2008 financial crisis, Vedder stated that he "somewhat reluctantly" supported the $700 billion bailout package included in the Emergency Economic Stabilization Act of 2008. He attributed the crisis to governmental failure and "public policy miscues," saying the 2008 financial crisis "never would have happened" in "the absence of these governmental mistakes."

=== Walmart wages ===
Vedder wrote, along with Wendell Cox, the December 2006 book The Wal-Mart Revolution in which they asserted that criticisms of wage practices at WalMart are "unfounded." He argued that Walmart workers are "paid fairly" given their skill and experience, and he stated that they also receive side benefits such as health insurance that is fairly similar to competing firms. He further argued that communities with new Walmart stores have greater total employment and higher incomes.

== Books and writings ==
Vedder's scholarly writings have appeared in journals such as Explorations in Economic History, The Journal of Economic History, and Agricultural History. He has written over two hundred such scholarly articles. Vedder's writings have also appeared in The Wall Street Journal, USA Today, Investor's Business Daily, and the Christian Science Monitor.

He has published the books The American Economy in Historical Perspective, Unemployment and Government in Twentieth-Century America (with Lowell Gallaway), Can Teachers Own Their Own Schools?, Going Broke by Degree: Why College Costs Too Much, and The Wal-Mart Revolution: How Big-Box Stores Benefit Consumers, Workers, and the Economy (with Wendell Cox).

== Bibliography ==
- Richard K. Vedder; David C. Klingaman (1975). Essays in Nineteenth Century Economic History: The Old Northwest. Ohio University Press. ISBN 978-0-8214-0170-5.
- Richard K Vedder; Lowell E. Gallaway (1997). Out of Work: Unemployment and Government in Twentieth-Century America. NYU Press. ISBN 978-0-8147-8833-2.
- Richard K. Vedder (2004). Going Broke by Degree: Why College Costs Too Much. American Enterprise Institute. ISBN 978-0-8447-4197-0.
- Richard K. Vedder; Wendell Cox (2006). The Wal-Mart Revolution: How Big-box Stores Benefit Consumers, Workers, and the Economy. AEI Press. ISBN 978-0-8447-4244-1.

== See also ==
- List of American Enterprise Institute scholars and fellows
- United States Congress Joint Economic Committee
