= Richard J. Cebula =

American economist

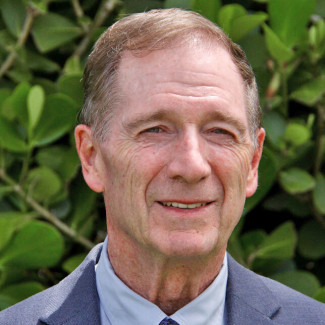
- Citizenship: American
- Occupations: Economist and academic
- Awards: Kenneth G. Elzinga Distinguished Teaching Award (2007); Lifetime Achievement in Advancing Regional Science Award (2013); University of Georgia Graduate School Alumni of Distinction Award (2013); Fellow, Academy of Economics and Finance (2014); Distinguished Fellow, MCRSA (2019); Roger R. Stough Outstanding Mentor Award (2023; Fellow, Southern Regional Science Association (2025)

Academic background
- Education: A.B. in economics M.A. in economics Ph.D. in economics
- Alma mater: Fordham College; University of Georgia; Georgia State University

Academic work
- Institutions: University of Tennessee

Richard J. Cebula is an economist and academic. He is an affiliate professor at the University of Tennessee and the editor-in-chief of The American Journal of Economics and Sociology. His research interests have included sports economics, microeconomics, economic freedom and markets, labor economics, health economics, and public economics & taxation. He is a recipient of the Kenneth G. Elzinga Distinguished Teaching Award from the Southern Economic Association and The Roger Stough Award in Recognition of Outstanding Mentorship from the North American Regional Science Council.

== Education ==
Cebula was born in Brooklyn, New York. In 1966, Cebula completed his A.B. in economics from Fordham College and earned his M.A. in economics from the University of Georgia in 1968. Later, he obtained his Ph.D. in economics from Georgia State University in 1971. In 2013, he received the University of Georgia Graduate School Alumni of Distinction Award as a member of the inaugural class of honorees.

== Career ==
From 1971 to 1973, Cebula worked as an assistant professor at Ohio University. Subsequently, he was employed as an assistant professor at Emory University, a position he maintained until 1976. Later, he was promoted to associate professor in 1976 and full professor in 1980 where he continued his career until 1992.

Between 1992 and 2006, he was a professor of economics at the Georgia Institute of Technology. He was appointed as the Solomons Endowed Chair in Economics and Finance from 2007 to 2010 at Georgia Southern University. From 2010 to 2020, he held the Walker/Wells Fargo Endowed Chair in Finance at Jacksonville University. He was a Visiting Professor at the Center for Study of Public Choice and Department of Economics at George Mason University from 2020 to 2023 before becoming an Affiliate Professor at the University of Tennessee. He is also the Editor-in-Chief of The American Journal of Economics and Sociology. He also has been President of the Academy of Economics and Finance, The Southern Regional Science Association, and The Mid-Continent Regional Science Association.

Cebula has written, co-authored, or edited 16 scholarly books, including Runaway College Costs (Johns Hopkins University Press, 2020) with James V. Koch, and The Economic Impact of Intercollegiate Athletics on Former Students: Unfulfilled Promises (Palgrave MacMillan, 2025) with J. Koch and R. Finelli. He has also published more than 600 articles in peer-reviewed scholarly journals, more than 100 of which are in leading journals. He has previously served as Editor-in-Chief of the Journal of Financial Economic Policy, the Journal of Economics and Finance, the Journal of Regional Analysis and Policy, and the Journal of Economics and Finance Education. He also serves on the Editorial Boards of 10 other economics journals, including the Advisory Council of the Harvard Business Review.

== Research ==
Cebula's work has focused on applied economics and public policy, with an emphasis on applied microeconomics, including labor economics, health economics, public economics and taxation, law and economics, and sports economics. His research has used empirical methods to examine how public policy, economic institutions, and market conditions affect economic outcomes and impact society.

Cebula's research has addressed issues in macroeconomic policy, including the impact of economic freedom on growth. He has analyzed fiscal variables, including taxation, to study government financial policies as well as financial outcomes, including interest rates and bond yields. His work has also examined topics such as tax evasion, the shadow economy, and the effects of economic freedom, and institutional factors on economic performance. In addition to fiscal and financial topics, he has contributed to research on migration, labor markets, and regional economic behavior. His studies have explored determinants of migration patterns, settlement decisions, and the role of economic conditions and public policy in shaping these movements.

According to RePEc, Cebula's research places him in the top 1% of all registered research economists. On ResearchGate, his research interest score exceeds 99% of researchers in fields such as Economic History, Economic Sociology, and Public Economics.

== Awards and honors ==
- 2007 – Kenneth G. Elzinga Distinguished Teaching Award, Southern Economic Association (SEA)
- 2013 – Lifetime Achievement in Advancing Regional Science Award, Mid-Continent Regional Science Association (MCRSA)
- 2013 – University of Georgia Graduate School Alumni of Distinction Award
- 2014 – Fellow, Academy of Economics and Finance (AEF)
- 2018 – Distinguished Service Award, (MCRSA)
- 2019 – Distinguished Fellow, (MCRSA)
- 2023 – Roger R. Stough Outstanding Mentor Award, The North American Regional Science Council (NARSC)
- 2025 – Distinguished Fellow, Southern Regional Science Association (SRSA)

== Selected articles ==
- Gatons, Paul K.; Cebula, Richard J. (1972). "Wage-Rate Analysis: Differentials and Indeterminacy". ILR Review. 25 (2): 207–212. doi:10.1177/001979397202500204.
- Gallaway, Lowell E.; Cebula, Richard J. (1973). "Differentials and Indeterminacy in Wage Rate Analysis: An Empirical Note". ILR Review. 26 (3): 991–995. doi:10.1177/001979397302600306.
- Cebula, Richard J. (1974). "Interstate Migration and the Tiebout Hypothesis: An Analysis According to Race, Sex and Age". Journal of the American Statistical Association. 69 (348): 876–879. doi:10.1080/01621459.1974.10480221.
- Cebula, Richard J. (1978). "An Empirical Note on the Tiebout-Tullock Hypothesis". The Quarterly Journal of Economics. 92 (4): 705. doi:10.2307/1883186.
- Barth, James; Cebula, Richard; Xu, Jiayi (2023). "The Paycheck Protection Program: Minority vs. Non-Minority Bank Response". American Business Review. 26 (1). doi:10.37625/abr.26.1.5-18.
- Wang, Shuangjin; Zhang, Xiaoqian; Cebula, Richard J.; Foley, Maggie (2024). "Cross-shareholding, Managerial capabilities, and Strategic risk-taking in enterprises: A game or a win-win?". Finance Research Letters. 62 105228. doi:10.1016/j.frl.2024.105228.
- Cebula, Richard J. (2024). "The Tiebout-Tullock hypothesis re-examined using tax freedom measures: the case of post-Great Recession state-level gross in-migration". Public Choice. 199 (1): 65–81. doi:10.1007/s11127-022-01038-5.
- Cebula, Richard; Jolley, G. Jason (2024). "Economic Dynamism: Interrelationships among Entrepreneurship-Friendly Environments, Geographic Mobility, and Labor Market Freedom in both the Pre- and Post-Great Recession Periods". American Business Review. 27 (2). doi:10.37625/abr.27.2.640-656.
- Wang, Shuangjin; Wang, Puxuan; Cebula, Richard; Foley, Maggie; Liang, Chen (2025). "Scientometric analysis of development and opportunities for research in digital agriculture innovation management". Environmental Modelling & Software. 188 106392. doi:10.1016/j.envsoft.2025.106392.
- Cebula, Richard (2025). "A Cointegrating Regression Analysis of the Impacts of Greater Economic Freedom and Perceived Risk from a Larger National Debt-to-GDP Ratio on the Real Cost of Borrowing for Corporations in the U.S.". American Business Review. 28 (2). doi:10.37625/abr.28.2.481-495.
