= Net worth =

Total assets minus total outside liabilities of an individual or a company

Net worth is the value of all the non-financial and financial assets owned by an individual or institution minus the value of all its outstanding liabilities. Financial assets minus outstanding liabilities equal net financial assets, so net worth can be expressed as the sum of non-financial assets and net financial assets. This concept can apply to companies, individuals, governments, or economic sectors such as the financial corporations sector, or even entire countries.

== By entity ==
=== Calculation ===
Net worth is the excess of assets over liabilities. The assets that contribute to net worth can include homes, vehicles, various types of bank accounts, money market accounts, stocks and bonds. The liabilities are financial obligations such as loans, mortgages, and accounts payable (AP) that deplete resources.

=== Companies ===
Net worth in business is also referred to as equity. It is generally based on the value of all assets and liabilities at the carrying value which is the value as expressed on the financial statements. To the extent items on the balance sheet do not express their true (market) value, the net worth will also be inaccurate. On reading the balance sheet, if the accumulated losses exceed the shareholder's equity, net worth becomes negative.

Net worth in this formulation does not express the market value of a firm; a firm may be worth more (or less) if sold as a going concern, or indeed if the business closes down.

Net worth vs. debt is a significant aspect of business loans. Business owners are required to "trade on equity" in order to further increase their net worth.

=== Individuals ===
For individuals, net worth or wealth refers to an individual's net economic position: the value of the individual's assets minus liabilities. Examples of assets that an individual would factor into their net worth are retirement accounts, other investments, home(s), and vehicles. Liabilities include both secured debt (such as a home mortgage) and unsecured debt (such as consumer debt or personal loans). Typically intangible assets such as educational degrees are not factored into net worth, even though such assets positively contribute to one's overall financial position.

When calculating personal net worth for purposes of identifying assets that are available to provide income, especially retirement income, some personal finance experts recommend not including the home equity of the person's primary residence.

For a deceased individual, net worth can be used for the value of their estate when in probate.

Individuals with considerable net worth are described in the financial services industry as high-net-worth individuals and ultra high-net-worth individuals.

In personal finance, knowing an individual's net worth can be important to understand their current financial standing and give a reference point for measuring future financial progress.

=== Governments ===
Balance sheets that include all assets and liabilities can also be constructed for governments. Compared with government debt, a government's net worth is an alternative measure of the government's financial strength. Most governments utilize an accrual-based accounting system in order to provide a transparent picture of government operational costs. Other governments may utilize cash accounting in order to better foresee future fiscal events. The accrual-based system is more effective, however, when dealing with the overall transparency of a government's spending. Massive governmental organizations rely on consistent and effective accounting in order to identify total net worth.

=== Countries ===
A country's net worth is calculated as the sum of the net worth of all companies and individuals resident in that country, plus the government's net worth. For the United States, this measure is referred to as the financial position, and totalled $123.8 trillion as of 2014.

== Importance ==
Net worth is a representation of where one stands financially. This can be used to help create budgets, influence wise spending, motivate one to pay off debt, and it can motivate someone to save and invest. Net worth is also important to look at when considering retirement.

== See also ==
- Net operating assets
- Negative equity
