= Fiscal Responsibility Act =

Fiscal Responsibility Act may refer to:

== India ==
- Fiscal Responsibility and Budget Management Act, 2003, an Act of the Parliament of India

== United Kingdom ==
- Fiscal Responsibility Act 2010, an Act of the United Kingdom Parliament

== United States ==
- Tax Equity and Fiscal Responsibility Act of 1982, an Act of the 97th United States Congress
- Fiscal Responsibility Act of 2007, a proposed Act of the 110th United States Congress
- Fiscal Responsibility Act of 2023, an Act of the 118th United States Congress
