= Government revenue =

How the state collects money

Government revenue or national revenue is money received by a government from taxes and non-tax sources to enable it, assuming full resource employment, to undertake non-inflationary public expenditure. Government revenue as well as government spending are components of the government budget and important tools of the government's fiscal policy. The collection of revenue is the most basic task of a government, as the resources released via the collection of revenue are necessary for the operation of government, provision of the common good (through the social contract in order to fulfill the public interest) and enforcement of its laws; this necessity of revenue was a major factor in the development of the modern bureaucratic state.

Government revenue is distinct from government debt and money creation, which both serve as temporary measures of increasing a government's money supply without increasing its revenue.

== Sources ==
There are a variety of sources from which government can derive revenue. The most common sources of government revenue have varied in different places and time periods. In modern times, tax revenue is typically the primary source of revenue for a government. Types of taxes recognized by the OECD include taxes on income and profits (including income taxes and capital gains taxes), social security contributions, payroll taxes, property taxes (including wealth taxes, inheritance taxes, and gift taxes), and taxes on goods and services (including value-added taxes, sales taxes, excises, and duties). Besides, lotteries can also bring in considerable revenue for the government. In early 2009, the Australian government used lotteries to boost spending, generating more than $60m in additional tax revenue for state governments. Foreign aid is often a major source of revenue for developing countries, and for some developing countries it is the primary source of revenue.

== Politics ==
Most governments have a finance minister that oversees government revenue. Governments may also have a separate revenue service dedicated to the collection of revenue.

== History ==
Throughout history, the way governments have been financed, the way they have generated wealth, has changed. This reflects the changing dynamics of societies, economies, and governance structures over time. In ancient civilizations such as Mesopotamia, Egypt and Rome, government revenue came primarily from taxes on trade and agriculture.

=== Mesopotamia ===
In the ancient Mesopotamia, as they lacked a currency system, households were obliged to pay taxes through goods instead. Poll taxes mandated that each man contribute a cow or sheep to the authorities. Merchants moving goods between locations were subjected to tolls and customs duties. Consequently, to minimize their exposure to these levies, merchants frequently engaged in smuggling. However, if caught smuggling, they faced punishment such as imprisonment.

=== Roman Empire ===
Taxes in the ancient Roman Empire were quite different. They were rife with unauthorized money-making schemes. The notorious publicani were private tax collectors hired by provincial governors to gather taxes exceeding the official rates. These publicani would then collaborate with other wealthy Romans, buying grain cheaply during harvest and selling it at exorbitant prices during shortages. They also lent money to struggling locals at exorbitant interest rates, often 4% or more per month. It's no wonder they were consistently grouped with "sinners" in the New Testament. Every emperor grappled with the challenge of funding the expanding administration. Various attempts to reform the tax system were made over time. The most significant changes occurred later. Diocletian, from A.D. 284-305, implemented a universal price freeze with mixed success while reintroducing the land tax on Italian landowners, mostly paid in goods rather than money. He also imposed additional tolls on traders and corporations. While theoretically providing relief to taxpayers, in practice, it fell short due to subsequent taxes imposed after the land tax was paid. Moreover, the burden disproportionately fell on the local senatorial class, risking financial ruin for any shortfall in payment. To compound matters, Constantine, Diocletian's successor, made the municipal senatorial class hereditary. This meant that even if your father had squandered the family fortune, you still inherited his status as a senator along with his tax obligations.

=== Crusader States ===
In the 12th and 13th centuries, within the crusader states, the ruling class, known collectively as the Franks, displayed a remarkable proficiency in financial management and governance. This was largely due to their ability to inherit and utilize existing administrative systems established by their Arab and Greek predecessors. Notably, the Holy Land had been under the rule of the Byzantine Empire for over three centuries, leaving behind intricate bureaucratic structures. While many of the institutions vital to the crusader states were not originally their own, the Franks adeptly adapted the legacy of their predecessors to suit their own requirements.

Regarding sources of revenue, the Franks, like those who came before them, augmented their treasury through the following methods: 1. Rents on land, i.e. payments made by tenant farmers to the landowner in exchange for the privilege of cultivating and utilizing the land. 2. Tariffs on imports and exports collected at the ports 3. Fees levied by the courts on individuals convicted of crimes and minor offenses. 4. Machinery used for extracting olive oil and pressing grapes to make wine 5. Fees for anchoring and using harbor facilities

=== Middle Ages ===
In the Middle Ages, Feudal dues constituted another form of taxation, typically paid in goods or services rather than money and were established by custom. The church enjoyed exemptions from these dues, so monarchs often resorted to demanding loans, known as forced loans, from ecclesiastical institutions. It was a common occurrence for one bishop to reverse the actions of another, typically in exchange for payment. Threats of excommunication held little sway, leading to successful coercion of loans from the church, which, owing to various factors, was notably wealthy. The only excommunication threat that carried weight was if it originated from the Pope. However, starting from 1378, when there were three rival Popes, the nobility exploited this situation shamelessly. This state of affairs persisted until the Council of Constance resolved the schism in 1418.

=== The United States Example ===
In 1915, the primary sources of income for the federal government differed significantly. Nearly half of all federal revenue originated from excise taxes, including those imposed on alcohol and tobacco. Additionally, 30.1% of federal revenue derived from customs duties, also known as tariffs, levied on imported goods from foreign countries. As per the Census data from 1915, revenues from liquor taxes totaled $224 billion, constituting 66.8% of excise tax revenue, while tobacco taxes amounted to $80 billion, making up 23.8% of excise tax revenue. Whereas, over the next century, the primary sources of federal revenue faded away, where individual income taxes and payroll taxes contributed overwhelmingly to the government's income.

In 1915, individual income taxes contributed 5.9 percent to federal revenue, and corporate income taxes contributed 5.6 percent. During that period, both taxes were comparatively modest: the highest rate for individual income tax stood at 7 percent, while the highest corporate tax rate was merely 1 percent. Over time, Congress maintained the majority of federal excise tax rates at their current levels, resulting in a slower growth of overall excise tax revenues compared to the expansion of the federal government. Several additional federal taxes became more noticeable.

The Revenue Act of 1942 brought about a significant shift in individual income taxes. Previously targeting only wealthy Americans, these taxes were broadened to apply to approximately 50 million households. As a result of this expansion, individual income taxes surged from comprising 13.6 percent of federal revenues in 1940 to constituting 45 percent of revenues by 1944, thereby emerging as the primary source of federal income. Moreover, payroll taxes increased significantly over the course of the 20th century, driven by the implementation and growth of Social Security and Medicare programs.

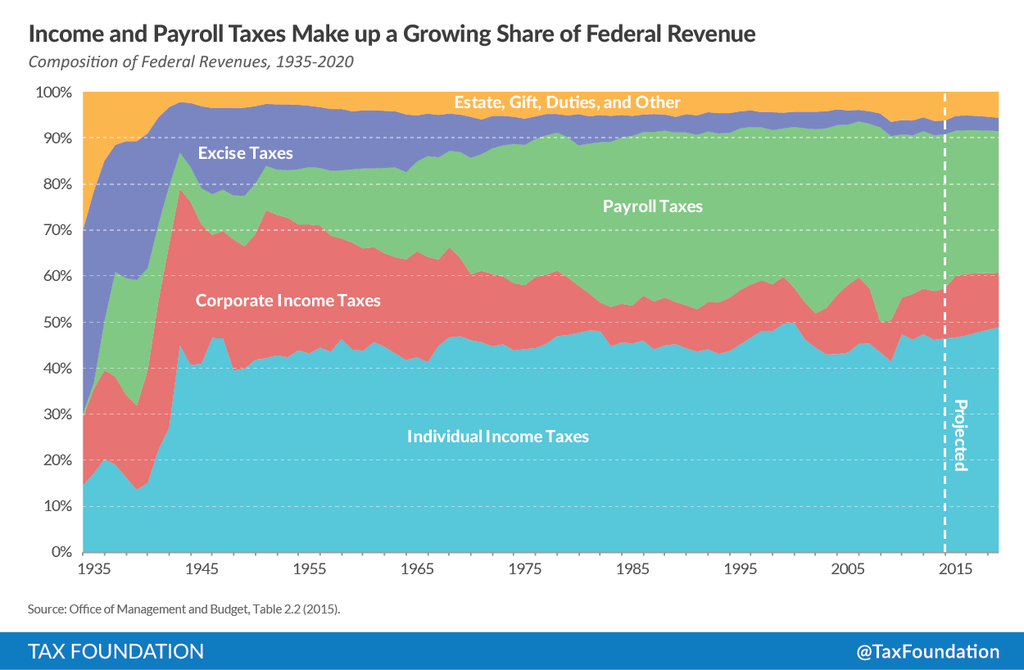

== See also ==
- Fiscal illusion
- List of countries by government budget
- List of countries by tax revenue to GDP ratio
- Ministry of Finance
