= Fiscal illusion =

Failure to accurately perceive the amount of government expenditure

In public choice theory, fiscal illusion is a failure to accurately perceive the amount of government expenditure. The theory of fiscal illusion was first developed by the Italian economist Amilcare Puviani in his 1903 book Teoria della illusione finanziaria (Theory of Financial Illusion (not yet translated into English, but translated into German in 1960 under the title Die Illusionen in der öffentlichen Finanzwirtschaft, Berlin: Duncker & Humblot, 1960)). Fiscal illusion occurs when government revenues are not completely transparent or are not fully perceived by taxpayers; then the cost of government is seen to be less than it actually is. Since some or all taxpayers benefit from government expenditures from these unobserved or hidden revenues, the public's appetite for government expenditures increases, thus providing politicians incentive to expand the size of government.

== Overview ==
Fiscal illusion has been used to explain the flypaper effect often seen when a higher level of government provides a grant to a lower level of government. Here, instead of reducing taxes in order to pass on the benefits of the grant to local taxpayers, the grant-receiving body increases expenditures in order to expand local services in some way. Fiscal illusion is invoked as an explanation because the local taxpayers are not fully aware of the grant as a source of the local government's revenue.

Another example of fiscal illusion can be seen in local property tax politics. Here renters, who do not pay local property taxes directly, may vote for an expansion of local government services. Fiscal illusion theory suggests they support this policy because its cost is masked by its roundabout nature (through an increase in their rent payments).. In this case, however, economic theory suggests that only taxes falling on new structures and improvements will be passed on; taxes on existing structures (with deductions for maintenance) and on land are not expected to be passed on as they do not affect the returns to new housing investment, and therefore housing supply. In this case, renters have a material interest in land tax increases used to fund local services or infrastructure, and their agitation for such cannot be considered a case of fiscal illusion.

In their book Democracy in Deficit (1977), James M. Buchanan and Richard E. Wagner suggest that the complicated nature of the U.S. tax system causes fiscal illusion and results in greater public expenditure than would be the case in an idealized system in which everyone is aware in detail of what their share of the costs of government is.

Finally, another example of fiscal illusion may be seen in deficit spending. CATO Institute economist William Niskanen (2004), for instance, has noted that the "starve the beast" strategy popular among US conservatives wherein tax cuts now force a future reduction in federal government spending is empirically false. Instead, he has found that there is 'a strong negative relation between the relative level of federal spending and tax revenues'. Tax cuts and deficit spending, he argues, make the cost of government appear to be cheaper than it otherwise would be.

Mourao (2008) attempts to quantify fiscal illusion empirically for almost 70 democracies since 1960.

== See also ==
- Baumol's cost disease
- Money illusion

== Additional sources ==
- Mueller, Dennis C. (2003). Public Choice III. Cambridge University Press. pp. 221–22.
- Niskanen, William (2002). "‘Starve the Beast’ Does Not Work". CATO Policy Report March/April 2004.
