= Fiscal Responsibility Act of 2007 =

Proposed Act of the United States Congress

The Fiscal Responsibility Act of 2007 (H.R. 500) was introduced to the United States Congress by Rep. Nathan Deal of Georgia's 9th congressional district on January 16, 2007.

== Legislative overview ==
The bill, which had eight co-sponsors, was referred to the House Administration Committee and the House Oversight and Government Reform Committee. Its primary purpose was to provide members of Congress with a personal financial incentive to curb the federal government's budget deficits. The proposed legislation gained endorsements from the American Conservative Union and Downsize DC, reflecting support from fiscal conservative groups.

=== Provisions ===
Under the bill, the pay of members of Congress would have been docked in years when the federal government ran a budget deficit. Key details of the proposed pay adjustments included:

- A 5% salary reduction in the year following any deficit, based on pay rates from two years prior.
- Progressive reductions of up to 10% for consecutive years of deficits.
- Restoration of salaries, including cost-of-living adjustments, after any deficit-free fiscal year.

Exemptions were provided for spending deemed by the Congressional Budget Office (CBO) to be directly related to military conflicts lasting over 30 days or in response to terrorist attacks on U.S. soil.

=== Rationale and goals ===
The bill aimed to directly link Congressional salaries to federal fiscal performance, thereby incentivizing lawmakers to adopt balanced budget measures. Supporters argued that this would enhance accountability and fiscal responsibility within the federal government. Critics, however, expressed concerns about its effectiveness and potential unintended consequences, such as incentivizing short-term fiscal decisions over long-term economic stability.

=== Outcome ===
Despite its innovative approach to fiscal accountability, the bill did not pass. Legislative inaction reflected broader challenges in securing bipartisan support for deficit-control measures during the 110th Congress.

== Legacy ==
Although the Fiscal Responsibility Act of 2007 did not become law, its introduction set the stage for future discussions on accountability mechanisms within Congress. On June 3, 2023, the Fiscal Responsibility Act of 2023 was signed into law, representing a renewed effort to address fiscal policy and government spending.
