= Democracy in Deficit =

Economics book

Democracy in Deficit: The Political Legacy of Lord Keynes is a book by American economists James M. Buchanan and Richard E. Wagner originally published in 1977.

== Contents ==
The book consists of 12 chapters:

1. What Hath Keynes Wrought?
2. The Old-Time Fiscal Religion
3. First, the Academic Scribblers
4. The Spread of the New Gospel
5. Assessing the Damages
6. The Presuppositions of Harvey Road
7. Keynesian Economics in Democratic Politics
8. Money-Financed Deficits and Political Democracy
9. Institutional Constraints and Political Choice
10. Alternative Budgetary Rules
11. What about Full Employment?
12. A Return to Fiscal Principle
