= Fiscal transparency =

Publication of treasury documents

Fiscal transparency refers to the publication of information on how governments raise, spend, and manage public resources. More specifically, it means publication of high quality information on how governments raise taxes, borrow, spend, invest, and manage public assets and liabilities.

Fiscal transparency includes public reporting on the past, present, and future state of public finances. Fiscal policies have critical impacts on economic, social and environmental outcomes in all countries at all levels of development.

Fiscal transparency is sometimes used synonymously with budget transparency. However, fiscal transparency is in principle wider than budget transparency. It includes all public assets, liabilities, and contingent obligations, as well as revenues and expenditures authorised in an annual budget i.e. it includes all stocks as well as flows, whereas stocks often do not feature in budget documents (aside from debt).

Fiscal transparency includes fiscal activities undertaken outside the budget sector but within the government sector e.g. by autonomous government agencies or extra-budgetary funds that may not be reported as part of the budget sector.

Fiscal transparency also includes ‘quasi-fiscal activities’ undertaken outside the government sector by public corporations, the central bank, or (sometimes) by private corporations i.e. activities that are fiscal in character but that are not financed by government but by the corporations themselves, such as subsidised lending or subsidised service delivery by public corporations, or construction of public infrastructure by companies developing natural resources (Reference: Background Paper prepared for the Open Government Partnership-GIFT Fiscal Openness Working Group).

== Budget transparency ==
On the other hand, “Budget transparency” may refer to the narrower budget sector (e.g. ‘budgetary central government), any may not include the budgets of autonomous agencies, or extra-budgetary funds. The term may also refer to a wider concept e.g. the International Budget Partnership’s ‘Open Budget Survey’, which includes some questions on assets and liabilities but which focuses on 8 key reports centred around the budget. The term budget transparency is generally not used to refer to as wide a concept as fiscal transparency.

Fiscal openness refers to fiscal transparency together with direct public participation in fiscal policy formulation and implementation. Following the 2008 financial crisis, international fiscal transparency initiatives have increasingly incorporated public participation as a key element in order to promote improved policy formulation and implementation, and to strengthen accountability for fiscal management (see below).

The 1997 Asian financial crisis first prompted the international community to set out a comprehensive codification of what is meant by fiscal transparency. The IMF’s Code of Good Practices on Fiscal Transparency, adopted in 1998 (and revised in 2001 and 2007), comprised four pillars: clarity of roles and responsibilities; open budget processes; public availability of information; and assurances of integrity. The Code was accompanied by a Fiscal Transparency Manual, which together with the Code provided the basis for an IMF initiative to assess country practices against the Code - the so-called Reports on the Observance of Standards and Codes (ROSC). By the end of 2006 around half of the Fund's member countries had undertaken a Fiscal ROSC, nearly all of which were published on the Fund's web site.

In the early 2000s a number of further fiscal transparency initiatives were launched. The International Federation of Accountants (IFAC) initiated the International Public Sector Accounting Standards (IPSAS) (href: http://www.ipsasb.org) program, and has since introduced two bases of public sector accounting: cash, and accrual. In 2001 the IMF's Statistics Department issued a fully revised Government Finance Statistics Manual (GFSM2001), which set the accrual basis of recording transactions, including a government balance sheet, as the standard for all countries for reporting analytical fiscal statistics. In 2002 the OECD issued the Best Practices on Budget Transparency, and the following year the Extractive Industries Transparency Initiative (EITI) was launched. In 2005 the IMF issued a Guide on Resource Revenue Transparency that contained generally recognized good or best practices for transparency of resource revenue management in countries that derive a significant share of revenues from natural resources. Commencing much earlier, the International Organization of Supreme Audit Institutions (INTOSAI) has developed a comprehensive set of international standards that play an important role in fiscal transparency and accountability.

This decade also saw the launch of a major civil society initiative to promote greater transparency of government budgets: the Open Budget Survey (OBS) and the associated Open Budget Index (OBI) developed by the International Budget Partnership. The objective of the Open Budget Initiative was to improve governance and combat poverty: ‘open governments transform lives’. The survey has evolved to cover three pillars of budget accountability: (i) Budget transparency, rated by the answers to 109 survey questions covering eight key documents over the annual budget cycle. This produces a score between 0 and 100 on the OBI; (ii) Public participation, evaluated using 16 questions introduced in the 2012 survey that rate opportunities for direct public participation in budget preparation and implementation; (iii) the strength of oversight, using 15 questions on the strength of the legislature and the supreme audit institution. The first OBS was published in 2006, and the fifth survey, covering 102 countries, was published in September 2015. The survey is implemented by independent budget experts based in each of the countries surveyed, under the oversight of the International Budget Partnership. Each survey is peer reviewed by in-country experts, and reviewed by IBP experts, and a draft is made available to each government for comment.

== Fiscal Transparency Code ==
In a significant paper on Fiscal Transparency, Accountability, and Risk, the IMF in 2012 reviewed the state of fiscal transparency after the 2008 financial crisis and proposed a series of improvements to existing international fiscal transparency standards and monitoring arrangements. The 2012 paper laid the groundwork for the IMF's new Fiscal Transparency Code and Fiscal Transparency Evaluation that replaced the 2007 Code and the related fiscal module of the ROSC.

The new Code covers four key elements of fiscal transparency:

- Pillar I: Fiscal Reporting.
- Pillar II: Fiscal Forecasting and Budgeting.
- Pillar III: Fiscal Risk Analysis and Management.
- Pillar IV: Resource Revenue Management.

For each of the principles defined in the Code, the new Code differentiates between basic, good, and advanced practices in order to distinguish between different levels of performance and capacity and to provide countries with clear milestones toward full compliance.

Pillars I, II, and III have been issued, and a draft of Pillar IV has been made available for public consultation in 2015 and piloting in the field. It adapts the principles of the first three pillars to the particular circumstances of resource-rich countries.

To date thirteen Fiscal Transparency Evaluations have been conducted by the IMF and nine of the evaluation reports have been finalized and published on the IMF's web site: for Bolivia, Costa Rica, Finland, Ireland, Mozambique, the Philippines, Portugal, Romania, and Russia.

== Further assessments of fiscal transparency ==
Further assessments of fiscal transparency, or of elements of budget transparency, are available from:

- The Public Expenditure and Financial Accountability (PEFA) program, a multi-donor initiative intended to improve the quality of public financial management (PFM) in countries receiving development assistance. PEFA was launched in 2001 and comprises a set of ordinal indicators that measure the performance of PFM systems. A number of the indicators measure elements of budget transparency e.g. indicators on the comprehensiveness of budget documents, the extent of unreported operations, public access to key fiscal information, fiscal reporting, the coverage of audit reports, and legislative oversight. As of mid-2015 PEFA assessments had been completed in 149 countries (46 governments and 136 sub-national governments).
- The United States State Department's annual Fiscal Transparency Reports that assess fiscal transparency in countries that are anticipated recipients of US foreign assistance funds. The reports, produced since 2008 and published since 2012, evaluate the public availability, substantial completeness, and reliability of budget documents, as well as the transparency of processes for awarding government contracts and licenses for natural resource extraction. The 2015 report covered 140 countries, and found that 60 countries did not meet the Department's defined minimum level of fiscal transparency. The reports can be found at

== Global Initiative for Fiscal Transparency ==
In addition to the revision of the IMF Fiscal Transparency Code, the 2008 financial crisis also prompted more widespread reflection on the effectiveness of the existing international arrangements to promote fiscal transparency and accountability.

Global Initiative for Fiscal Transparency
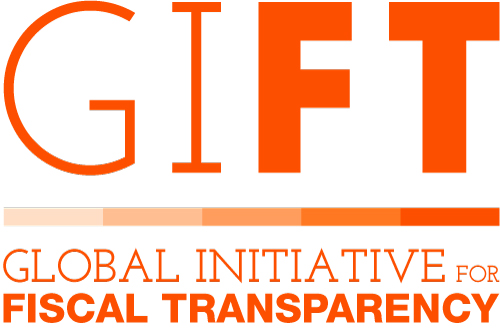
- Abbreviation: GIFT
- Type: International multi-stakeholder action network
- Purpose: Advance and institutionalize global norms and significant, continuous improvements on fiscal transparency, engagement, and accountability in countries around the world.
- Headquarters: Washington, D.C., United States
- Region served: Worldwide
- Network Director: Juan Pablo Guerrero
- Website: fiscaltransparency.net

One outcome of this was the creation of the Global Initiative for Fiscal Transparency (GIFT) in 2011. GIFT is a multi-stakeholder action network that aims to “Advance and institutionalize global norms and significant, continuous improvements on fiscal transparency, engagement, and accountability in countries around the world.” GIFT's Lead Stewards are the World Bank, the IMF, the International Budget Partnership, the International Federation of Accountants, the Federal Secretary of Budget & Planning of the Government of Brazil and the Philippines Department of Budget & Management. A range of other official and civil society organisations are stewards of GIFT.

Although fiscal openness is improving in many countries, the rate is uneven and slow, and backlashes are constantly registered: it might take a generation to have significant and sustainable improvement in important world regions. At the same time, the challenge is complex and broad and needs multiple stakeholders to address it in a coordinated manner. GIFT connects important international actors with other networks, together with champion governments and civil society organizations: while facilitating dialogue and cooperation in a platform where relevant stakeholders and networks participate, GIFT strengthens norms and creates incentives for countries to engage in a dialogue with civil society organizations, to improve transparency and engagement on the source and use of public resources.

GIFT's Action-Agenda is organized and implemented around four main streams of work:

1. Advancing Global Norms on Fiscal Transparency GIFT helps strengthening the normative architecture for fiscal transparency norms and pursues the adoption of a new set of principles on public participation in budget making.

2. Increasing and Improving Peer-Learning and Technical Assistance GIFT continues to develop the Open Government Partnership-GIFT Fiscal Openness Working Group, with the goal of working with governments and CSOs to improve fiscal transparency in various countries, and bringing them together to support each other; by providing a forum to share experiences, GIFT intends to create incentives through peer pressure, as well as practical approaches and innovations.

3. Aligning Incentives Work with Greater Knowledge (Evidence based Research Agenda) GIFT is focusing on advancing research on evidence of incentives, development impacts, and practical approaches and innovations in fiscal transparency: country case studies on public participation, fiscal open data, fiscal transparency incentives and other research have been produced.

4. Harnessing New Technologies/Open Data to engage the General Public GIFT has develop a Community of Practice platform as a communications mechanism for training, online seminars, virtual meetings, online discussion, good practices, online training courses, discussions, blogs, etc. At the same time, GIFT is developing an open budget data specification intended to make easy and simple the publication of budget data, increase the use of visualization tools supplied with budget data, and ease the re-use of budget data for governments and the public.

One of GIFT's first actions was the development of a new set of High Level Principles of Fiscal Transparency, Participation and Accountability, designed to sit above the existing set of international standards and norms, to promote increased coherence across those standards, and to promote the development of new norms where there are gaps. The GIFT High Level Principles were endorsed by the General Assembly of the United Nations (UNGA) in December 2012 (UNGA resolution 67/218).

Two of the High Level Principles assert transparency and participation as citizen rights. High Level Principle One asserts that the public has a right to fiscal information. This reflects the recognised right to access to information, which is internationally accepted as a fundamental civil right. It establishes that the public has the right to information on fiscal policies, and fiscal transparency ensures that the public can track the way this money is used.

High Level Principle 10, on the other hand, asserts a public right to direct public participation in the formulation and implementation of fiscal policy. This has subsequently been reflected in the incorporation of requirements for public participation in the 2014 IMF Fiscal Transparency Code, and in the Organization for Economic Cooperation and Development's Principles of Budgetary Governance 2014.

From the OBS-2015 Executive Report: Results from the Open Budget Survey 2015 reveal large gaps in the amount of budget information that governments are making available to the public. The average OBI score of the 102 countries surveyed in 2015 is 45 out of 100. A large majority of the countries assessed – in which 68 percent of the world's population live – provide insufficient budget information. These 78 countries have OBI scores of 60 or less.

A troubling 17 countries provide scant or no budget information, with scores of 20 or less.

The Survey found that around one-third of budget documents that should be available to the public are not. They were either not produced at all, produced for internal use only, or published too late to be useful. Of particular concern, governments in 16 countries failed to even publish the foundational document that describes the government's proposed budget policies, the Executive's Budget Proposal.

Many of the budget documents that are missing from the public domain are prepared, but remain off limits to the public. Budget transparency could be significantly advanced if governments were to take the simple step of releasing these already-prepared documents. Failing to publish information that is already being produced is clearly a question of political will, which donors and civil society can influence. In addition, the forthcoming global development and climate change agreements should require public reporting of investments toward meeting these commitments, a key step toward opening budgets.

The Survey also found that even when budget documents are published, they frequently lack sufficient detail. For example, the Executive's Budget Proposals that are published provide, on average, less than three-fifths of the desired information.

Thus, to even further increase budget transparency, governments need to provide more comprehensive budget information. This can be an issue of a government's capacity, and so donors and civil society can support progress by providing technical assistance.

Although fiscal transparency is improving in many countries, the rate is uneven and slow: it may take a generation to achieve significant and sustainable improvement in important world regions. At the same time, the challenge is complex and broad, and needs multiple stakeholders to address it in a coordinated manner. To disclose what government organizations do with financial recourses is not always easy; in fact, there is much resistance to fiscal transparency.

There is evidence that fiscal transparency strengthens the efficiency, equity, effectiveness, stability and sustainability of fiscal policies. This in turn enhances the likelihood that fiscal policies will have positive economic, social and environmental impacts1.

== See also ==
- Fiscal illusion, a failure to accurately perceive the amount of government expenditure
- The global financial system: the worldwide framework of legal agreements, institutions, and both formal and informal economic actors that together facilitate international flows of financial capital for purposes of investment and trade financing.
- Open government
- United Nations' COFOG: Classification of the Functions of Government, a classification of expenditure accounts, defined by the United Nations Statistics Division in order to enable comparisons between countries.
- Radical transparency
