= Richard E. Wagner =

American economist (born 1941)

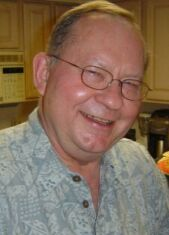
- Richard Wagner
- Born: April 28, 1941 (age 85); Jamestown, North Dakota, U.S.

Academic background
- Education: University of Virginia; University of Southern California

Academic work
- Discipline: Public finance, public choice theory
- School or tradition: Public Choice school
- Website: www.richardewagner.com; Information at IDEAS / RePEc

Richard Edward Wagner (born April 28, 1941) is an American economist and professor emeritus at George Mason University. His research focuses on public finance, public choice, macroeconomics, and political economy. He is associated with the public choice tradition and has written extensively on fiscal policy, democratic governance, constitutional economics, and the institutional foundations of economic activity. Wagner co-authored Democracy in Deficit: The Political Legacy of Lord Keynes (1977) with economist James M. Buchanan. His later work developed the concept of entangled political economy and examined macroeconomics through the framework of complex systems.

== Biography ==
Wagner was born on April 28, 1941, in Jamestown, North Dakota. He received a Bachelor of Science degree from the University of Southern California in 1963 and a Ph.D. in economics from the University of Virginia in 1966. At Virginia, he studied under economist James M. Buchanan, whose work in public choice and constitutional political economy influenced Wagner's approach to the study of government and economic institutions.

== Career ==
Wagner began his academic career in 1966 as an assistant professor at the University of California, Irvine.

In 1968, Wagner moved to Tulane University to concentrate on economics research and teaching. He held academic appointments at Virginia Polytechnic Institute and State University, Auburn University, and Florida State University. In 1988, he joined George Mason University as the Holbert R. Harris Professor of Economics.

At George Mason University, Wagner served as chair of the Department of Economics from 1989 to 1995 and as director of graduate studies during several periods. He retired in June 2022 and holds the title of professor emeritus. Following his retirement, he continued his research and writing in collaboration with former doctoral students and other scholars.

== Research ==
Wagner's research examines the relationship between economic activity, political institutions, and social organization. Focusing on public choice theory and constitutional political economy, he has investigated public finance, government expenditure, public debt, and the institutional conditions that shape collective decision-making. His work also focuses on the history of economic thought, particularly the Scottish Enlightenment and its influence on political economy.

=== Public finance and public choice ===
Wagner's early research addressed taxation, public expenditure, and fiscal institutions. His book The Fiscal Organization of American Federalism (1971) examined public finance within the American federal system.

In Democracy in Deficit: The Political Legacy of Lord Keynes (1977), co-authored with James M. Buchanan, Wagner analyzed the political incentives surrounding government borrowing and deficit financing.

In Fiscal Sociology and the Theory of Public Finance (2007), he examined the relationship between fiscal arrangements and the social and political structures in which they operate.

=== Political economy and social institutions ===
Wagner's work also focuses on the interdependence of political and economic processes. In Politics as a Peculiar Business: Insights from a Theory of Entangled Political Economy (2016), he developed the concept of entangled political economy to analyze the interactions between governmental institutions and market activities.

His research also draws on the Scottish Enlightenment, particularly its treatment of social order as an outcome of human interaction within institutional and legal constraints. Wagner has argued that economics should examine the organization of social relationships rather than focus exclusively on resource allocation under idealized assumptions.

=== Macroeconomics and complexity ===
Wagner has examined macroeconomic as products of interactions among individuals and institutions rather than as the decisions of a unified economic actor. In Mind, Society, and Human Action: Time and Knowledge in a Theory of Social-Economy (2010), he explored the roles of knowledge, time, and human action in economic processes. His book Macroeconomics as Systems Theory: Transcending the Micro-Macro Dichotomy (2020) examined aggregate economic patterns through systems theory.

== Honors and awards ==
His scholarship has also been the subject of retrospective discussion in The Legacy of Richard E. Wagner, an edited volume published by the Mercatus Center at George Mason University in 2023.

On 11 November 2023, Wagner received an honorary Doctor of Social Sciences degree from Universidad Francisco Marroquín in Guatemala City.

== Selected publications ==
- Wagner, Richard E. (1971). The fiscal organization of American federalism: description, analysis, reform. Markham series in public policy analysis. Chicago: Markham Pub. Co. ISBN 978-0-8410-0907-3.
- Wagner, Richard E. (1976-03-01). "Revenue structure, fiscal illusion, and budgetary choice". Public Choice. 25 (1): 45–61. doi:10.1007/BF01726330. ISSN 1573-7101.
- Wagner, Richard E. (1976). "Institutional Constraints and Local Community Formation". The American Economic Review. 66 (2). American Economic Association: 110–115. ISSN 0002-8282.
- Buchanan, James M.; Wagner, Richard E.; Buchanan, James M. (2000). Democracy in deficit: the political legacy of Lord Keynes. The collected works of James M. Buchanan. Indianapolis: Liberty Fund. ISBN 978-0-86597-227-8.
- Wagner, Richard E. (1983). Public finance: revenues and expenditures in a democratic society. Boston: Little, Brown. ISBN 978-0-316-91684-4.
- Wagner, Richard E. (1989). To promote the general welfare: market processes vs. political transfers. San Francisco, Calif: Pacific Research Institute for Public Policy. ISBN 978-0-936488-25-7.
- Tollison, Robert D.; Wagner, Richard E. (2011-05-18). The Economics of Smoking. Springer Netherlands. ISBN 978-94-011-3893-2.
- "Romance, Realism, and Economic Reform" (co-authored with Tollison) in Kyklos vol. 44, no. 1 (1991)
- Rowley, Charles Kershaw; Thorbecke, Willem; Wagner, Richard E. (1995). Trade protection in the United States. Brookfield, Vt: E. Elgar. ISBN 978-1-85898-198-7.
- Wagner, Richard E. (2007). Fiscal sociology and the theory of public finance: an exploratory essay. New thinking in political economy. Cheltenham, UK ; Northampton, MA: Edward Elgar. ISBN 978-1-84720-246-8.
- Wagner, Richard E. (2013). Mind, society, and human action: time and knowledge in a theory of social economy. Routledge foundations of the market economy (1. issued in paperback ed.). London: Routledge. ISBN 978-0-415-75001-1.
- Wagner, Richard E. (2012). "A macro economy as an ecology of plans". Journal of Economic Behavior & Organization. 82 (2–3): 433–444. doi:10.1016/j.jebo.2011.07.019.
- Wagner, Richard E., ed. (2016). Politics as a peculiar business: insights from a theory of entangled political economy. New thinking in political economy. Cheltenham, UK ; Northampton, MA: Edward Elgar Publishing. ISBN 978-1-78536-547-8.
- Wagner, Richard E. (2020). Macroeconomics As Systems Theory: Transcending the Micro-Macro Dichotomy. Cham: Springer International Publishing AG. ISBN 978-3-030-44465-5.
- Wagner, Richard E. (2022). Rethinking public choice. Rethinking economics. Cheltenham, UK ; Northampton, MA: Edward Elgar Publishing. ISBN 978-1-80220-473-5.
- Wagner, Richard E. (2022). Rethinking economics as social theory. Rethinking economics. Cheltenham, UK ; Northampton, MA, USA: Edward Elgar Publishing. ISBN 978-1-80220-475-9.
- Tuszynski, Meg Patrick; Wagner, Richard E. (2024). Reason, Ideology, and Democracy: A Study in Entangled Political Economy. Cham: Springer Nature Switzerland. doi:10.1007/978-3-031-69840-8. ISBN 978-3-031-69842-2.
