= Deficit hawk =

Political slang term

Deficit hawk is a political slang term in the English-speaking world for people who place great emphasis on keeping government budgets under control. 'Hawk' can be used to describe someone calling for harsh or pain-inducing measures (alluding to the predatory nature of hawks in the natural world) in many political contexts; in the specific context of deficit reduction, the term is more commonly applied to those advocating for cuts in government spending than to those supporting increases in taxes.

Economist and opinion writer Paul Krugman has popularized the use of "deficit scold" in place of deficit hawk. According to Krugman, a columnist of The New York Times, "the Peter G. Peterson Foundation is deficit-scold central; Peterson funding lies behind much of the movement." Deficit hawks often warn that unsustainable fiscal policies could lead to investors losing confidence in U.S. government bonds, which would in turn force an increase in interest rates. Krugman has dismissed this concern by saying that there is no evidence that these "bond vigilantes" will appear anytime soon.

The Concord Coalition is another influential political advocacy group dedicated to promoting a balanced budget in the United States. The Coalition is generally perceived as bipartisan.

Critics of deficit hawks have argued that hawks stoke fears about the deficit in order to dismantle the social safety net. William Greider claims, "Their real intent is to stymie the very spending programs that can deliver economic recovery and relief to battered citizens." Greider points to the example of World War II spending during the Great Depression, in which the government ran up massive deficits but set up America's postwar prosperity. And Dean Baker, co-director of the Center for Economic and Policy Research (CEPR), suggests a duplicity in their motives as well:

It will matter far more to our children and grandchildren whether they share in the gains of economic growth than if they have to pay higher tax rates for Social Security and Medicare. The rich, with the full complicity of the media, are doing their best to keep national policy focused on the cost of Social Security and Medicare. But the arithmetic says that the upward redistribution to the wealthy is the far more important issue for future living standards.

The political power of deficit hawks has waned considerably since the COVID-19 pandemic, which resulted in widespread deficit spending by many governments around the world in order to combat the economic downturn caused by the pandemic.

== See also ==
- Monetary hawk and dove
- Balanced budget
- Balanced budget amendment
- Balance of payments
- Citizens Against Government Waste
- Clintonomics
- Concord Coalition
- Fiscal conservatism
- Fiscal council
- Fiscal policy
- Fiscal responsibility
- United States federal budget
