= Concord Coalition =

American think tank focused on the federal budget

The Concord Coalition is a political advocacy group in the United States, formed in 1992. A bipartisan organization, it was founded by U.S. Senator Warren Rudman, former Secretary of Commerce Peter George Peterson, and U.S. Senator Paul Tsongas. The Concord Coalition's advocacy centers on ending deficit spending and promoting a balanced budget in the U.S. federal government. The group's mission statement is to educate "the public about the causes and consequences of federal budget deficits, the long-term challenges facing America's unsustainable entitlement programs, and how to build a sound foundation for economic growth."

Former Senator Bob Kerrey was named a co-chair of the Concord Coalition in January 2002. Robert L. Bixby has been the executive director of the Concord Coalition since 1999. In March 2025, Concord Coalition announced former U.S. Representative Carolyn Bourdeaux as its new executive director.

== Activities ==
Since 2006, the Concord Coalition has organized the Fiscal Wake-Up Tour, visiting cities to message to citizens and elected officials about the country's debt and fiscal future. Participants in the tour include representatives from The Brookings Institution, The Heritage Foundation, the Committee for Economic Development, the Progressive Policy Institute, and the American Enterprise Institute. Former Comptroller General of the United States David M. Walker serves as an advisor to the tour and participates in its public events.

The group's executive director, Robert Bixby, has noted that the federal deficit "is not some abstract issue in Washington" and that it "has real-world consequences for what's going to happen in state and local governments."

The Coalition's efforts to raise public awareness, with Bixby touring across the nation, plays a key role in the 2008 documentary film I.O.U.S.A.

== Board of directors ==
- Co-chairman – Warren Rudman
- Co-chairman – Bob Kerrey
- Co-chairman – Paul Tsongas (1941–1997)
- President – Peter G. Peterson
- Secretary-Treasurer/Budget Chairman – Charles A. Bowsher
- Finance Chairman – Eugene M. Freedman
- Executive Director – Carolyn Bourdeaux

== See also ==
- List of think tanks in the United States
- Balance of payments
- Citizens Against Government Waste
- Deficit hawk
- Fiscal conservatism
- Fiscal responsibility
- PAYGO
- United States federal budget
- National debt of the United States
