= Fiscal conservatism =

Political and economic philosophy

In American political theory, fiscal conservatism or economic conservatism is a political and economic philosophy regarding fiscal policy and fiscal responsibility with an ideological basis in capitalism, individualism, limited government, and laissez-faire economics. Fiscal conservatives advocate tax cuts, reduced government spending, free markets, deregulation, privatization, free trade, and minimal government debt. Fiscal conservatism follows the same philosophical outlook as classical liberalism.

The term has its origins in the era of the American New Deal during the 1930s as a result of the policies initiated by modern liberals, when many classical liberals started calling themselves conservatives as they did not wish to be identified with what was being called liberalism in the United States. In the United States, the term liberalism has become associated with the welfare state and expanded regulatory policies created as a result of the New Deal and its offshoots from the 1930s onwards.

Fiscal conservatives formed one of the three legs of the traditional American conservative movement that had emerged during the 1950s, together with social conservatism and national defense conservatism. Many Americans who are classical liberals also tend to identify as libertarian, holding more culturally liberal views and advocating a non-interventionist foreign policy while supporting lower taxes and less government spending. As of 2020, 39% of Americans polled considered themselves "economically conservative".

Because of its proximity to the United States, the term has entered the lexicon in Canada. In many other countries, economic liberalism, or simply liberalism, is used to describe what Americans call fiscal conservatism.

== Overview ==
=== Principles ===
Fiscal conservatism is the economic philosophy of prudence in government spending and debt. The principles of capitalism, limited government, and laissez-faire economics form its ideological foundation. Fiscal conservatives advocate the avoidance of deficit spending, the lowering of taxes, and the reduction of overall government spending and national debt whilst ensuring balanced budgets. In other words, fiscal conservatives are against the government expanding beyond its means through debt, but they will usually choose debt over tax increases. They strongly believe in libertarian principles such as individualism and free enterprise, and advocate deregulation, privatization, and free trade.

In his Reflections on the Revolution in France, Edmund Burke argued that a government does not have the right to run up large debts and then throw the burden on the taxpayer, writing "it is to the property of the citizen, and not to the demands of the creditor of the state, that the first and original faith of civil society is pledged. The claim of the citizen is prior in time, paramount in title, superior in equity. The fortunes of individuals, whether possessed by acquisition or by descent or in virtue of a participation in the goods of some community, were no part of the creditor's security, expressed or implied. ... [T]he public, whether represented by a monarch or by a senate, can pledge nothing but the public estate; and it can have no public estate except in what it derives from a just and proportioned imposition upon the citizens at large".

=== Factions or subgroups ===
Although all fiscal conservatives generally agree on a smaller and less expensive government, there are disagreements over priorities. There are three main factions or subgroups, each advocating for a particular emphasis. Deficit hawks emphasize balancing government budgets and reducing the size of government debt, viewing government debt as economically damaging and morally dubious since it passes on obligations on to future generations who have played no part in present-day tax and spending decisions. Deficit hawks are willing to consider tax increases if the additional revenue is used to reduce debt rather than increase spending.

A second group put their main emphasis on tax cuts rather than spending cuts or debt reduction. Many embrace supply-side economics, arguing that as high taxes discourage economic activity and investment, tax cuts would result in economic growth, leading in turn to higher government revenues. According to them, these additional government revenues would reduce the debt in the long term. They also argue for reducing taxes even if it were to lead to short-term increases in the deficit. Some supply-siders have advocated that the increases in revenue through tax cuts make drastic cuts in spending unnecessary. However, the Congressional Budget Office has consistently reported that income tax cuts increase deficits and debt and do not pay for themselves. For example, the CBO estimated that the Bush tax cuts added about $1.5 trillion to deficits and debt from 2002 to 2011 and it would have added nearly $3 trillion to deficits and debt over the 2010–2019 decade if fully extended at all income levels.

A third group makes little distinction between debt and taxes. This group emphasizes reduction in spending rather than tax policy or debt reduction. They argue that the true cost of government is the level of spending, not how that spending is financed. Every dollar that the government spends is a dollar taken from workers, regardless of whether it is from debt or taxes. Taxes simply redistribute purchasing power; it does so in a particularly inefficient manner, reducing the incentives to produce or hire, and borrowing simply forces businesses and investors to anticipate higher taxes later on.

== History ==
=== Classical liberalism ===
Classical liberalism in the United States forms the historical foundation for modern fiscal conservatism. Kathleen G. Donohue argues that classical liberalism in the 19th-century United States was distinct from its counterpart in Britain:

[A]t the center of classical liberal theory [in Europe] was the idea of laissez-faire. To the vast majority of American classical liberals, however, laissez-faire did not mean no government intervention at all. On the contrary, they were more than willing to see the government provide tariffs, railroad subsidies, and internal improvements, all of which benefited producers. What they condemned was intervention on behalf of consumers.

Economic liberalism owes its ideological creation to the classical liberalism tradition in the vein of Adam Smith, Friedrich Hayek, Milton Friedman, Ayn Rand, and Ludwig von Mises. They provided moral justifications for free markets. Liberals of the time, in contrast to modern ones, disliked government authority and preferred individualism. They saw free market capitalism as the preferable means of achieving economic ends.

=== Early to mid 20th century ===
In the early 20th century, fiscal conservatives were often at odds with progressives who desired economic reform. During the 1920s, Republican President Calvin Coolidge's pro-business economic policies were credited for the successful period of economic growth known as the Roaring Twenties. However, his actions may have been due more to a sense of federalism than fiscal conservatism as Robert Sobel notes: "As Governor of Massachusetts, Coolidge supported wages and hours legislation, opposed child labor, imposed economic controls during World War I, favored safety measures in factories, and even worker representation on corporate boards".

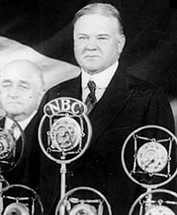
Herbert Hoover addresses a large crowd in his 1932 presidential campaign.

Contrary to popular opinion, then-Republican President Herbert Hoover was not a fiscal conservative. He promoted government intervention during the early Great Depression, a policy that his successor, Democratic President Franklin D. Roosevelt, continued and increased despite campaigning to the contrary. Coolidge's economic policies are often popularly contrasted with the New Deal deficit spending of Roosevelt and Republican Party opposition to Roosevelt's government spending was a unifying cause for a significant caucus of Republicans through even the presidencies of Harry S. Truman and Dwight D. Eisenhower. Barry Goldwater was a famous champion of both the socially and fiscally conservative Republicans.

In 1977, Democratic President Jimmy Carter appointed Alfred E. Kahn, a professor of economics at Cornell University, to be chair of the Civil Aeronautics Board (CAB). He was part of a push for deregulation of the industry, supported by leading economists, leading think tanks in Washington, a civil society coalition advocating the reform (patterned on a coalition earlier developed for the truck-and-rail-reform efforts), the head of the regulatory agency, Senate leadership, the Carter administration and even some in the airline industry. This coalition swiftly gained legislative results in 1978.

The Airline Deregulation Act (Pub.L. 95–504) was signed into law by President Carter on October 24, 1978. The main purpose of the act was to remove government control over fares, routes, and market entry of new airlines from commercial aviation. The CAB's powers of regulation were to be phased out, eventually allowing market forces to determine routes and fares. The Act did not remove or diminish the Federal Aviation Administration's regulatory powers over all aspects of airline safety.

In 1979, Carter deregulated the American beer industry by making it legal to sell malt, hops, and yeast to American home brewers for the first time since the effective 1920 beginning of Prohibition in the United States. This Carter deregulation led to an increase in home brewing over the 1980s and 1990s that by the 2000s had developed into a strong craft microbrew culture in the United States, with 3,418 micro breweries, brewpubs and regional craft breweries in the United States by the end of 2014.

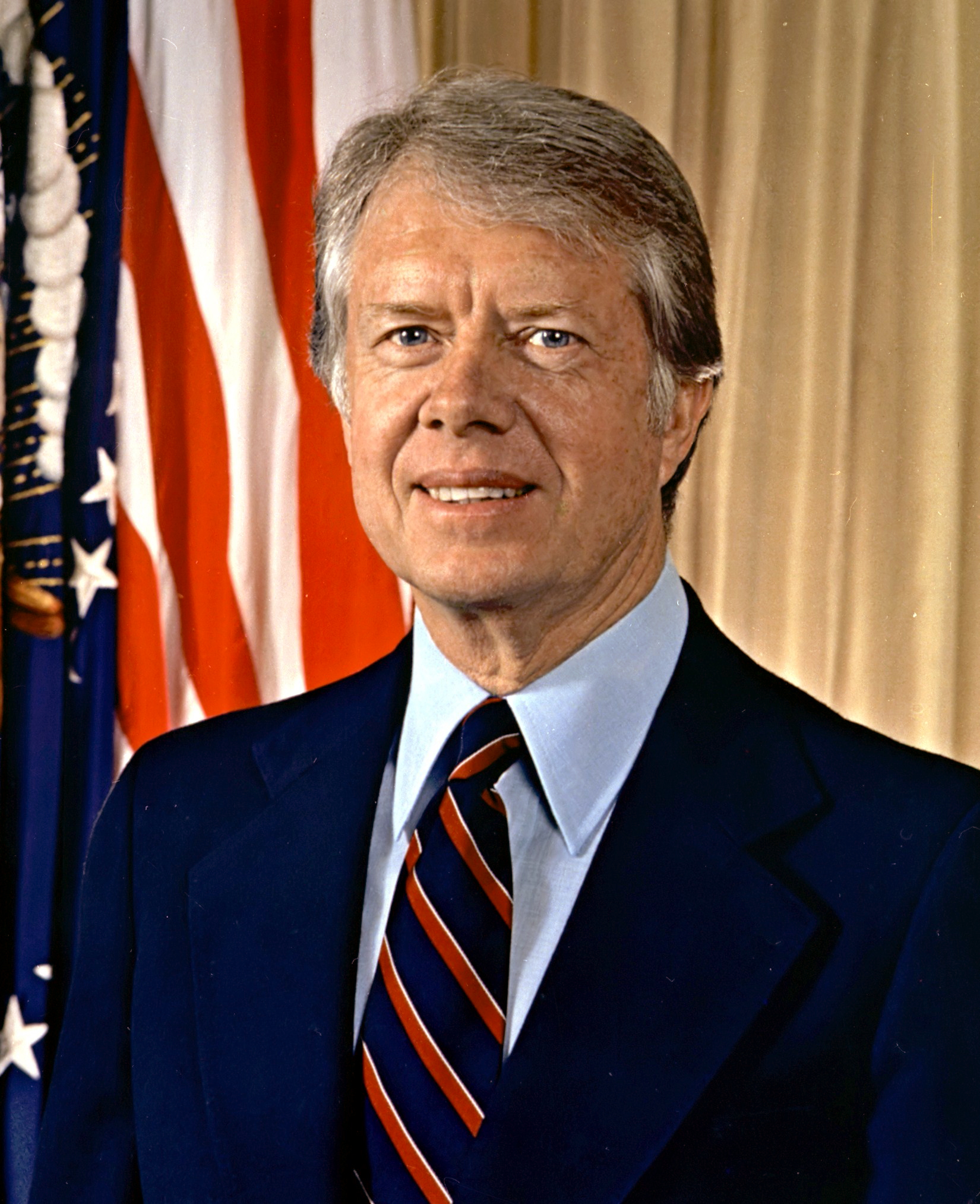
Jimmy Carter, who reduced the debt-to-GDP ratio in the 1970s

Public debt as a percentage of GDP fell rapidly in the post-World War II period and reached a low in 1974 under Richard Nixon. Debt as a share of GDP has consistently increased since then, except under Carter and Bill Clinton. The United States national debt rose during the 1980s as Ronald Reagan cut tax rates and increased military spending. The numbers of public debt as a percentage of GDP are indicative of the process:

raw data

=== Reagan era ===
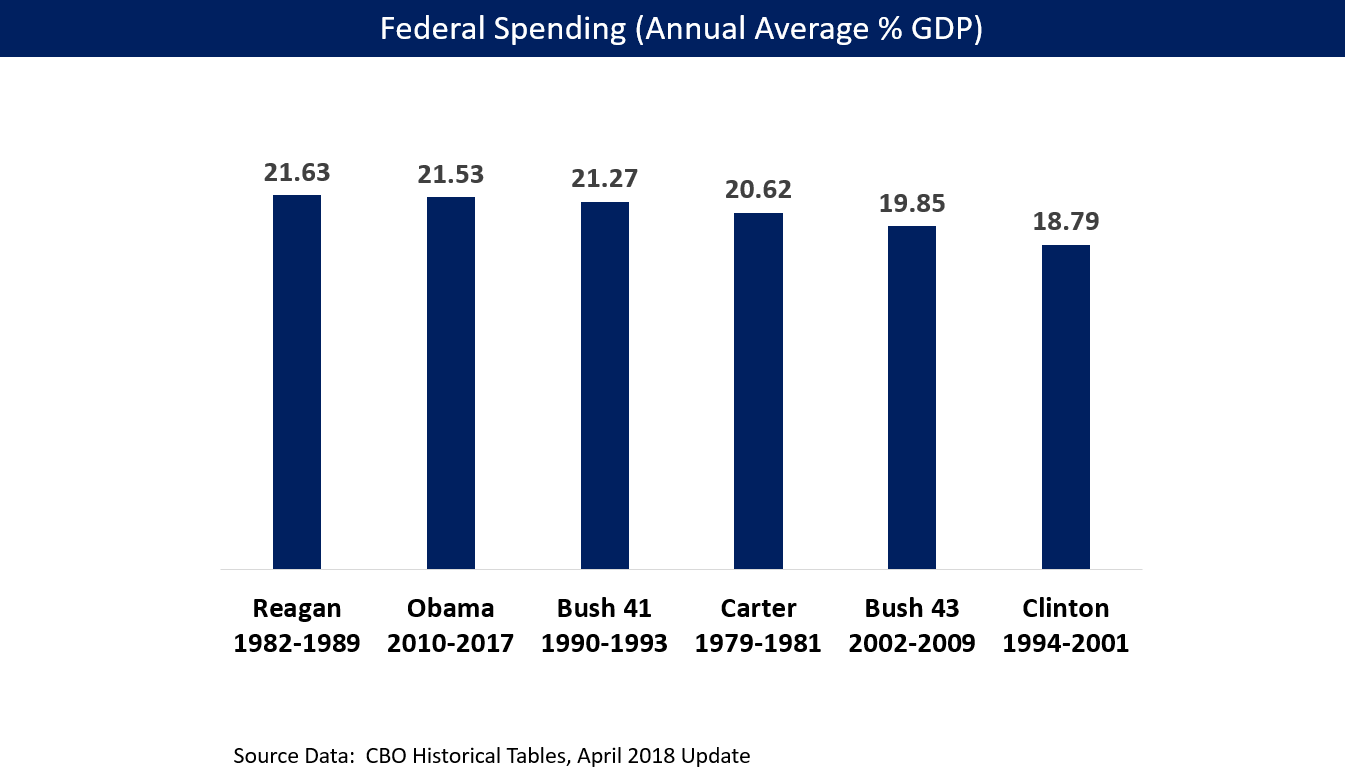
Ronald Reagan spent the most of any recent President (Carter to Obama) as measured by annual average percentage of the GDP.

Fiscal conservatism was rhetorically promoted during the presidency of Republican Ronald Reagan (1981–1989). During Reagan's tenure, the top personal income tax bracket dropped from 70% to 28% while payroll taxes and the effective tax rates on the lower two income quintiles increased. Reagan cut the maximum capital gains tax from 28% to 20%, though in his second term he raised it back up to 28%. He successfully increased defense spending, but conversely, liberal Democrats blocked his efforts to cut domestic spending. Real GDP growth recovered strongly after the 1982 recession, growing at an annual rate of 3.4% for the rest of his time in office. Unemployment dropped after peaking at over 10.7% percent in 1982, and inflation decreased significantly. Federal tax receipts nearly doubled from $517 billion in 1980 to $1,032 billion in 1990. Employment grew at about the same rate as the population.

According to a United States Department of the Treasury nonpartisan economic study, the major tax bills enacted under Reagan caused federal revenue to fall by an amount equal to roughly 1% of GDP. Although Reagan did not offset the increase in federal government spending or reduce the deficit, his accomplishments are more notable when expressed as a percent of the gross domestic product. Federal spending fell from 22.2% of the GDP to 21.2%. By the end of Reagan's second term, the national debt held by the public increased by almost 60% and the total debt equalled $2.6 trillion. In fewer than eight years, the United States went from being the world's largest creditor nation to the world's largest debtor nation.

=== Ross Perot ===
In the 1992 presidential election, Ross Perot, a successful American businessman, ran as a third-party candidate. Despite significant campaign stumbles and the uphill struggles involved in mounting a third-party candidacy, Perot received 18.9% of the popular vote (the largest percentage of any third-party candidate in modern history), largely based on his central platform plank of limited-government, balanced-budget fiscal conservatism.

=== Clinton era ===
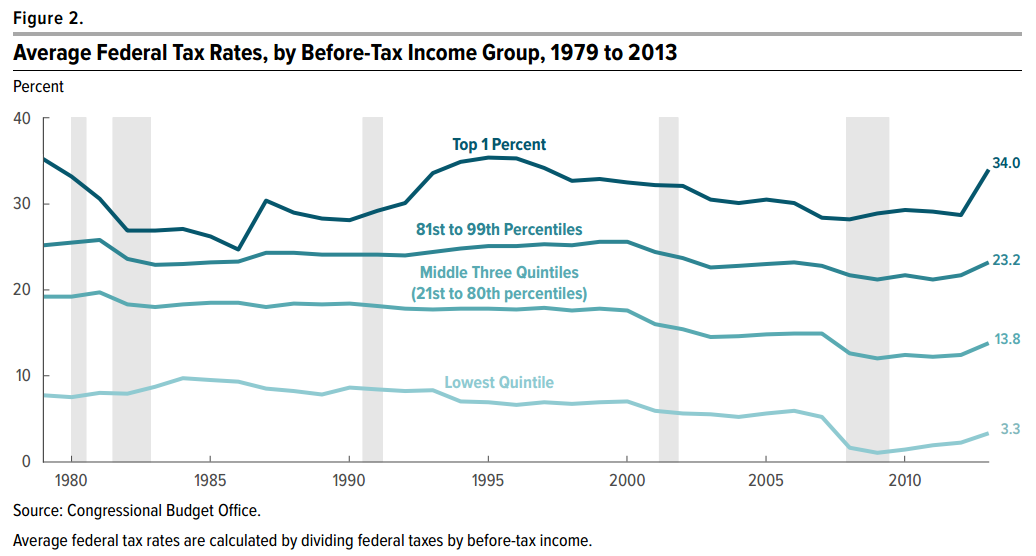
This table shows that Bill Clinton's Omnibus Budget Reconciliation Act of 1993 which increased the average federal tax rates for the top 1% while lowering average tax rates for the middle class was followed by President Barack Obama starting in 2013 through the partial expiration of the Bush tax cuts and that both tax increases lowered deficits relative to Congressional Budget Office policy baselines without them.

While the mantle of fiscal conservatism is most commonly claimed by Republicans and libertarians, it is also claimed in some ways by many centrist or moderate Democrats who often refer to themselves as New Democrats. Although not supportive of the wide range tax cut policies that were often enacted during the Reagan and Bush administrations, the New Democrat coalition's primary economic agenda differed from the traditional philosophy held by liberal Democrats and sided with the fiscal conservative belief that a balanced federal budget should take precedence over some spending programs.

Former President Bill Clinton, who was a New Democrat and part of the somewhat fiscally conservative Third Way advocating Democratic Leadership Council, is a prime example of this as his administration along with the Democratic-majority congress of 1993 passed on a party-line vote the Omnibus Budget Reconciliation Act of 1993 which cut government spending, created a 36% individual income tax bracket, raised the top tax bracket which encompassed the top 1.2% earning taxpayers from 31% to 39.6% and created a 35% income tax rate for corporations. The 1993 Budget Act also cut taxes for fifteen million low-income families and 90% of small businesses. Additionally during the Clinton years, the PAYGO (pay-as-you-go) system originally introduced with the passing of the Budget Enforcement Act of 1990 (which required that all increases in direct spending or revenue decreases be offset by other spending decreases or revenue increases and was very popular with deficit hawks) had gone into effect and was used regularly until the system's expiration in 2002.

In the 1994 midterm elections, Republicans ran on a platform that included fiscal responsibility drafted by then-Congressman Newt Gingrich called the Contract with America which advocated such things as balancing the budget, providing the President with a line-item veto and welfare reform. After the elections gave the Republicans a majority in the House of Representatives, newly minted Speaker of the House Gingrich pushed aggressively for reduced government spending which created a confrontation with the White House that climaxed in the 1995–1996 government shutdown. After Clinton's re-election in 1996, they were able to cooperate and pass the Taxpayer Relief Act of 1997, which lowered the top capital gains tax rate from 28% to 20% and the 15% rate to 10%.

After this combination of tax hikes and spending reductions, the United States was able to create budget surpluses from fiscal years 1998–2001 (the first time since 1969) and the longest period of sustained economic growth in United States history.

=== Modern fiscal conservatism ===
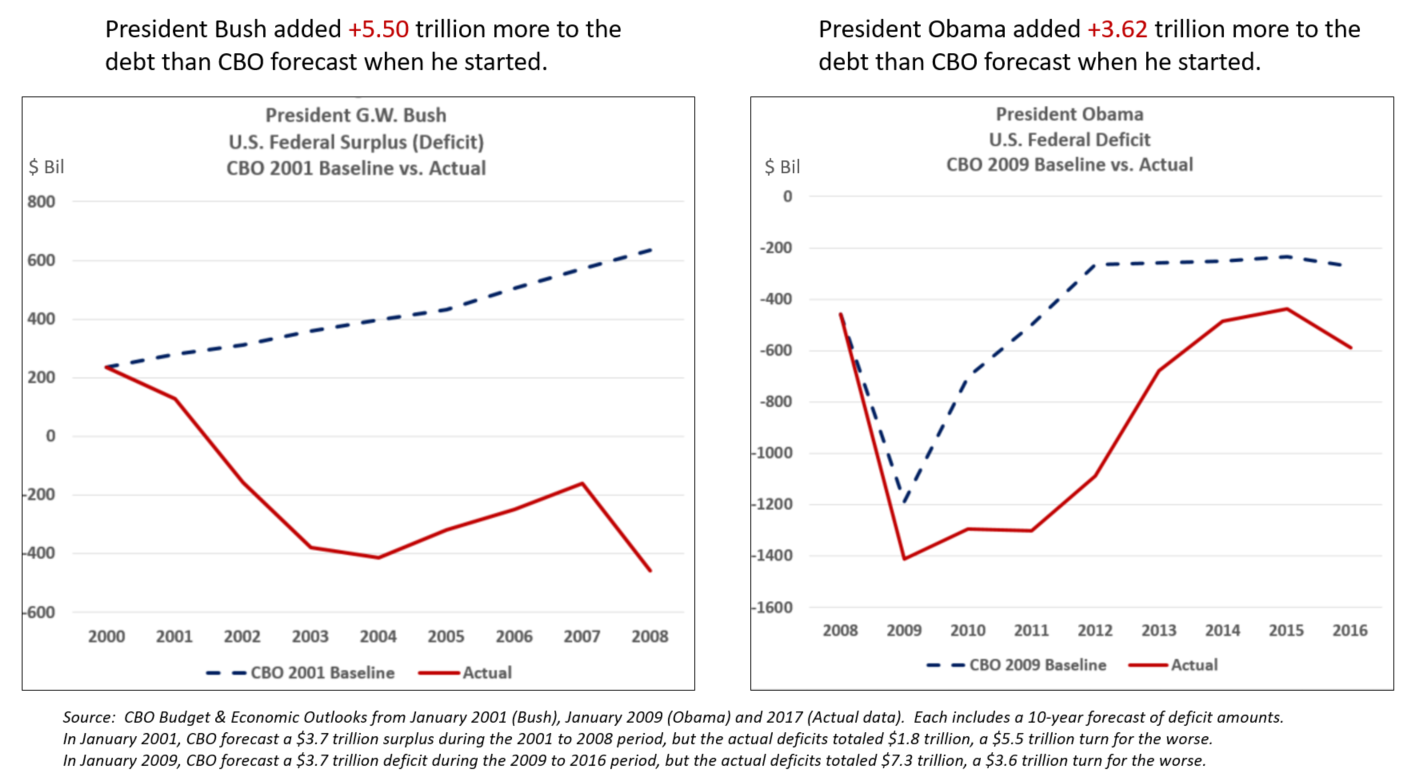
Comparison of annual federal deficits (CBO 10-year forecast from before inauguration vs. the actual amount) during the Obama and Bush presidencies showcasing how George W. Bush added far more to the debt relative to the CBO 2001 forecast than Obama added relative to the CBO 2009 forecast

American businessman, politician, and former Mayor of New York City Michael Bloomberg considers himself a fiscal conservative and expressed his definition of the term at the 2007 British Conservative Party Conference, stating:

To me, fiscal conservatism means balancing budgets – not running deficits that the next generation can't afford. It means improving the efficiency of delivering services by finding innovative ways to do more with less. It means cutting taxes when possible and prudent to do so, raising them overall only when necessary to balance the budget, and only in combination with spending cuts. It means when you run a surplus, you save it; you don't squander it. And most importantly, being a fiscal conservative means preparing for the inevitable economic downturns – and by all indications, we've got one coming.

While the term "fiscal conservatism" would imply budget deficits would be lower under conservatives (i.e., Republicans), this has not historically been the case. Economists Alan Blinder and Mark Watson reported in 2016 reported that budget deficits since WW2 tended to be smaller under Democratic Party presidents, at 2.1% potential GDP versus 2.8% potential GDP for Republican presidents, a difference of about 0.7% GDP. They wrote that higher budget deficits should theoretically have boosted the economy more for Republicans, and therefore cannot explain the greater GDP growth under Democrats.

By the 2020s, the Republican Party had largely abandoned fiscal conservatism as an ideological cornerstone.

== Rest of the world ==
=== Europe ===
As a result of the expansion of the welfare state and increased regulatory policies implemented by the Roosevelt administration beginning in the 1930s, in the United States, the term liberalism has today become associated with modern rather than classical liberalism. In Western Europe, the expanded welfare states created after World War II were created by socialist or social-democratic parties such as the British Labour Party rather than liberal parties. Many liberal parties in Western Europe tend to adhere to classical liberalism, with the Free Democratic Party in Germany being one example. The Liberal Democrats in the United Kingdom have a classical liberal and a social liberal wing of the party. In many countries, liberalism or economic liberalism is used to describe what Americans call fiscal conservatism.

=== United Kingdom ===
Fiscal conservatism in the United Kingdom was arguably most popular during the premiership of Conservative Margaret Thatcher. After a number of years of deficit spending under the previous Labour government, Thatcher advocated spending cuts and selective tax increases to balance the budget. As a result of the deterioration in the United Kingdom's public finances—according to fiscal conservatives caused by another spate of deficit spending under the previous Labour government, the late-2000s recession and by the Euro area crisis—the Cameron–Clegg coalition (Conservative–Liberal Democrats) embarked on an austerity programme featuring a combination of spending cuts and tax rises in an attempt to halve the deficit and eliminate the structural deficit over the five-year parliament.

=== Canada ===
In Canada, the rise of the socialist Co-operative Commonwealth Federation pushed the Liberal Party to create and expand the welfare state before and after World War II. Fiscal conservatism in Canada is generally referred to as Blue Toryism when it is present within the Conservative Party of Canada, and Blue Grit when present within the Liberal Party of Canada. In Alberta, fiscal conservatism is represented by the United Conservative Party. In Ontario, fiscal conservatism is represented by the Progressive Conservative Party of Ontario. However, the Ontario Liberal Party and Liberal Party of Canada have also strived for fiscal conservatism.

=== South Korea ===
The term is sometimes used in South Korea, where left-liberal Democratic Party of Korea (DPK) and conservative People Power Party (PPP) are the two main parties. Fiscal conservatism is mainly represented by PPP. South Korea's former president, Yoon Suk-yeol, is known as a "fiscal conservative".

== See also ==
- Balance of payments – Difference between the inflow and outflow of money to a country at a given time
- Balance of trade – Difference between the monetary value of exports and imports
- Capitalism – Economic system based on private ownership
- Citizens Against Government Waste – Fiscally conservative watchdog group
- Classical liberalism – Ideology supporting both civil and economic liberties
- Concord Coalition – American think tank focused on the federal budget
- Criticism of welfare – Social philosophy
- Economic freedom – Ability to make economic choices freely
- Economic liberalism – Political and economic ideology
- Market economy – Type of economic system
- Minarchism – Government with minimal intervention
- Republican Main Street Partnership – Moderate Republican fundraising organization
- Right-wing politics – Political ideologies favouring social orders
- Trickle-down economics – Economic and political term
