= Deficit reduction =

Deficit reduction can refer to any method of reducing a government budget deficit (including reduced government spending and/or increased government revenue).

== Policy approaches ==
Governments may pursue deficit reduction through a combination of expenditure reductions, revenue increases, or policies aimed at promoting economic growth. Spending-based measures can include cuts to public services, reductions in transfer payments, or reforms to entitlement programs. Revenue-based measures may involve raising tax rates, broadening the tax base, or improving tax compliance and enforcement.

Some governments implement fiscal rules or medium-term budget frameworks to constrain deficits over time. Others may adopt countercyclical fiscal policies, allowing deficits to rise during economic downturns and reducing them during periods of growth. The choice of approach often depends on economic conditions, political priorities, and concerns about debt sustainability.

== See also ==
- Deficit (disambiguation)
- Deficit Reduction Act (disambiguation)
- Deficit reduction in the United States
- United States Congress Joint Select Committee on Deficit Reduction
