= Rubinomics =

Economic policies of US President Bill Clinton

Rubinomics, a portmanteau of Rubin and economics, was originally used to collectively describe the economic policies of President of the United States Bill Clinton. It is named after Robert E. Rubin, former United States Secretary of the Treasury.

Rubinomics emphasizes the effect that balancing the government budget has on long-term interest rates. Taxes should match government spending in the long run, and deficit-financed tax cuts are a counter-productive way to increase growth. Instead, it proposes cutting the budget deficit through (but not limited to) increasing progressive taxation, decreasing regressive taxation, and lowering long-term interest rates. This can be seen as a form of the fiscal theory of the price level – fiscal policy affecting long term inflation (as expressed by long-term interest rates).

Rubinomics has never rejected Keynesian approaches to economics, which call for the government to run a deficit in times of recession. But it worries about the long-term effect that deficits, especially structural deficits, have on inflation.

During the early 1990s, long-term interest rates remained stubbornly high even as the Federal Reserve cut the Federal Funds rate. Rubin and most other economists (including Alan Greenspan) attributed this high yield curve to an "inflation premium" that bond-traders were demanding. Reducing interest rates, Rubin argued, would reduce "crowding out" of private capital by government borrowing and lead to increased private sector investment and consumption and, therefore, stronger growth.

Clinton, who had campaigned on the promise to put people first and invest in human capital, accepted Rubin's reasoning and put deficit reduction at the forefront of his economic plan, to the chagrin of more left-wing advisers such as Robert Reich and Joseph Stiglitz. In particular, Stiglitz was not opposed to Clinton's plan to reduce the deficit, but suggested that Clinton put more money into research and development, technology, infrastructure, and education, quoting "given the high returns for these investments, GDP in 2000 would have been even higher, and the economy's growth potential would have been stronger."

An early instance of Rubinomics is President Clinton proposing to raise taxes in 1993 that would cut the deficit by $500 billion over five years by reducing $255 billion of spending and raising taxes on the wealthiest 1.2% of Americans. Clinton signed the Omnibus Budget Reconciliation Act of 1993 into law on August 10, 1993. The law created a 36 percent to 39.6 percent income tax for high-income individuals in the top 1.2% of wage earners. Businesses were given an income tax rate of 35%. The cap was repealed on Medicare. Gas taxes were raised 4.3 cents per gallon. The taxable portion of Social Security benefits was also increased.

There were already a significant number of skeptics of this policy. Newt Gingrich, at the time a leading Republican member of the United States House of Representatives, predicted, "The tax increase will kill jobs and lead to a recession, and the recession will force people off of work and onto unemployment and will actually increase the deficit."

Instead, the economy expanded greatly; the fiscal adjustment helped bring the United States federal budget into surplus from fiscal years 1998 to 2001, the only surplus years since 1969. Debt held by the public, a primary measure of the national debt, fell relative to GDP throughout Clinton's two terms, from 47.8% in 1993 to 31.4% in 2001. Long-term interest rates, as measured by the 10-year U.S. Treasury, fell from 6.60% in January 1993 to 5.16% in January 2001, unemployment fell, and the budget deficit turned into a surplus. The U.S. stock market climbed, and the economy experienced the longest economic expansion to date, creating the environment that incubated the technology boom.

== See also ==
- Clintonomics
- Democratic Party (United States)
- Fiscal theory of the price level
- Freakonomics
- Reaganomics
