= Deficit Reduction Act =

The Deficit Reduction Act may refer to various pieces of United States legislation, including:

- Deficit Reduction Act of 1984
- Gramm-Rudman-Hollings Deficit Reduction Act of 1985
- Omnibus Budget Reconciliation Act of 1993
- Deficit Reduction Act of 2005

== See also ==
- Deficit (disambiguation)
