= Deficit =

A deficit is the amount by which a sum falls short of some reference amount.

== Economics ==
- Deficit (economics), the excess of an organization's expenditure over its revenue

== Psychology ==
- Attention deficit hyperactivity disorder, a developmental disorder
- Cognitive deficit, any characteristic that acts as a barrier to cognitive performance

== Other ==
- Defect (geometry), angular deficit
- Déficit, a 2007 Mexican film by Gael García Bernal

== See also ==
- Government debt, the accumulated amount of deficits; "debt" and "deficit" are sometimes confused.
- Deficit Reduction Act (disambiguation)
- Deficit reduction
- Fiscal (disambiguation)
