= Citizens Against Government Waste =

Fiscally conservative watchdog group

- Abbreviation: CAGW
- Formation: 1984
- Type: Advocacy group
- Headquarters: 1100 Connecticut Avenue NW
- Location: Washington, D.C.
- Region served: United States
- President: Thomas A. Schatz
- Website: http://www.cagw.org

Citizens Against Government Waste (CAGW) is a non-profit 501(c)(3) organization in the United States. It functions as a "government watchdog" and advocacy group for fiscally conservative causes. The Council for Citizens Against Government Waste (CCAGW) is the lobbying arm of CAGW, organized as a section 501(c)(4) organization and therefore is permitted to engage in direct lobbying activities. According to its website, "CAGW is a private, non-partisan, non-profit organization representing more than one million members and supporters nationwide. CAGW's stated mission is to eliminate waste, mismanagement, and inefficiency in the federal government."

== History ==
CAGW was founded in 1984 by industrialist J. Peter Grace and syndicated columnist Jack Anderson. Grace was chairman of President Ronald Reagan's Grace Commission (also known as the President's Private Sector Survey on Cost Control).

CAGW is located in Washington, D.C. Thomas A. Schatz has been president since 1992.

== Publications ==
CAGW produces a number of publications critical of government expenditures known colloquially as "pork-barrel" projects. The CAGW-published Congressional Pig Book Summary (Pig Book) is an annual list of such projects and their sponsors. The 2008 Pig Book identified 10,610 projects in that year's congressional appropriations bills that constitute the discretionary portion of the federal budget for fiscal 2008, costing taxpayers $17.2 billion.

Related publications include Prime Cuts, a list of recommendations for eliminating waste in the federal government and Porker of the Month, a monthly press release.

Since 1989, the CCAGW has examined congressional roll-call votes to determine which members of Congress are voting in what they view as the interest of taxpayers. CAGW makes public what legislators are engaging in "pork-barrel" spending based on 'key' votes for each congressional session.

== Activities ==
CAGW and CCAGW seek to influence public policy through public education, lobbying, and mobilization for email and letter campaigns to elected officials. CAGW claims to have helped save taxpayers $944 billion through its campaigns.

CAGW was one of the critics of a $23.5 billion Air Force plan in 2001 to lease and then buy 100 refueling tankers from Boeing. Congress squashed the plan after it was revealed that an Air Force official inflated the price in exchange for an executive job at Boeing.

CAGW was a critic of Sen. John Thune (R-S.D.) and his efforts to secure a $2.3 billion federal loan for a railroad company that once employed him as a lobbyist. The Federal Railroad Administration (FRA) cited an "unacceptably high risk to taxpayers" in denying the loan to the Dakota, Minnesota, and Eastern Railroad (DM&E) in 2007.

CAGW named Sen. Christopher Dodd (D-Conn.) its June 2008 Porker of the Month for accepting a preferential mortgage deal from Countrywide Financial which stood to benefit from a mortgage bailout bill he was pushing through Congress.

=== Microsoft's antitrust case litigation ===
In 2001, the Los Angeles Times reported that at least two dead people had sent a form letter by CAGW opposing the antitrust case against Microsoft to Mark Shurtleff, then Attorney General of Utah. State officials found that the decedents' family members had crossed out the names on the form letters and signed for them; another letter had come from the nonexistent city of "Tuscon, Utah".

=== Freeware initiative ===
In 2003, CAGW put out a press release opposed to what it called the "Freeware Initiative" in the State of Massachusetts, which it claimed would have required "that all IT expenditures in 2004 and 2005 be made on an open-source/Linux format."

Responding to the press release, a state official denied the existence of such an initiative and said the state was simply considering ways to integrate disparate systems using open standards such as HTTP (Hypertext Transfer Protocol), XML (Extensible Markup Language) and Java.

=== CAGW and tobacco ===
The St. Petersburg Times reported that CAGW "got at least $245,000 from the tobacco industry" and subsequently lobbied on its behalf. Internal tobacco industry documents made available by the 1998 Master Settlement Agreement indicate that CAGW and its affiliates supported the tobacco industry in several instances. Specifically, in 2001 when an industry-sponsored bill entitled the "Youth Smoking Reduction Act" was introduced in Congress, CAGW provided a letter of support, despite the opposition of most public health organizations. CAGW was also contacted by Phillip Morris to include ASSIST (Alcohol, Smoking and Substance Involvement Screening Test), a federal tobacco control program, in their Pig Book. ASSIST was considered an imminent threat to industry activities at the time.

Asked about his group's tobacco work, CAGW president Tom Schatz said, "We have always welcomed contributions to support the issues we support. Many of them have to do with fighting higher taxes and more regulations."

=== Other ===
Throughout its history, CAGW has been accused of fronting lobbying efforts of corporations to give them the appearance of "grassroots" support.

According to the St. Petersburg Times in 2006, the Pig Book has been used to benefit corporate donors, specifically health clubs who donated to CAGW. It listed federal grants to YMCAs who compete with those health clubs as waste. CAGW's president countered that "The Ys are there because they qualify as pork. Period."

A Senate Finance Committee investigating ties between CAGW (and other non-profits) and Jack Abramoff in 2006 stated in a report that the non-profits: 'probably violated their tax-exempt status "by laundering payments and then disbursing funds at Mr. Abramoff's direction; taking payments in exchange for writing newspaper columns or press releases that put Mr. Abramoff's clients in a favorable light; introducing Mr. Abramoff's clients to government officials in exchange for payment; and agreeing to act as a front organization for congressional trips paid for by Mr. Abramoff's clients."'

In 2007, CAGW supported a bill that would limit damages resulting from malpractice lawsuits. Many consumer watchdog groups opposed the bill.

=== "Chinese Professor" ad ===
The CAGW launched an ad, now commonly referred to as "Chinese Professor" for the 2010 midterm elections, which portrays a 2030 conquest of an indebted United States by China. Local Asian American extras were used to portray the Chinese students, although the actors were not informed of the nature of the shoot. Columnist Jeff Yang said of the ad, and others like it, "That’s what makes the widespread demonization of China and 'the Chinese' so frightening to Asian Americans: The line between Asians on that side of the ocean and those on this side has always been blurry to those with a surplus of rage and a deficit of judgment." Larry McCarthy, the producer of "Chinese Professor," defended his work by saying that "this ad is about America, it's not about China."

=== CARES Act ===
During the 2020 COVID-19 pandemic, the group received assistance between $150,000 and $350,000 in federally backed small business loan from Truist Bank as part of the Paycheck Protection Program, saying that the funds would allow them to keep 17 jobs. Their loan was seen as notable, since they campaign against excess government spending and are small-government advocates. CAGW said it was the first time they have accepted government money. Danny Westneat of The Seattle Times quipped that "We're all socialists now, apparently", calling CAGW an anti-debt crusader.

=== Net neutrality and bulk billing ban ===
CAGW condemns the FCC's proposed 2024 ban on bulk billing contracts, which allow the owner of a multi-tenant building choose the internet service provider for the tenants and make the payment mandatory as part of their rental contract. Many consumer protection groups consider these fees unfair and harmful for the residents.

It also describes net neutrality strictly negatively as "adversely impacting providers and consumers alike".
