= 2013 United States federal government shutdown =

From October 1 to 17, 2013, the United States federal government entered a shutdown and curtailed most routine operations because neither legislation appropriating funds for the fiscal year 2014 nor a continuing resolution for the interim authorization of appropriations for fiscal year 2014 was enacted in time. Regular government operations resumed October 17 after an interim appropriations bill was signed into law.

During the shutdown, about 800,000 federal employees were indefinitely furloughed, and another 1.3 million were required to report to work without known payment dates. Only those government services deemed "excepted" under the Antideficiency Act were continued; and only those employees deemed "excepted" were permitted to report to work. The previous U.S. federal government shutdown was in 1995–96. The 16-day-long shutdown of October 2013 is the fifth-longest government shutdown in U.S. history, after the 21-day 1995–96 shutdown, the 35-day 2018–2019 shutdown, the 43-day 2025 shutdown, and the 76-day 2026 partial shutdown of the Department of Homeland Security.

A "funding-gap" was created when the two chambers of Congress failed to agree to an appropriations continuing resolution. The Republican-led House of Representatives, encouraged by Ted Cruz and a handful of other Republican senators, and conservative groups such as Heritage Action, offered several continuing resolutions with language delaying or defunding the Affordable Care Act (commonly known as "Obamacare"). The Democratic-led Senate passed several amended continuing resolutions for maintaining funding at then-current sequestration levels with no additional conditions. Political fights over this and other issues between the House on one side and President Barack Obama and the Senate on the other led to a budget impasse which threatened massive disruption.

The deadlock centered on the Continuing Appropriations Resolution, 2014, which was passed by the House of Representatives on September 20, 2013. The Senate stripped the bill of the measures related to the Affordable Care Act, and passed it in revised form on September 27, 2013. The House reinstated the Senate-removed measures, and passed it again in the early morning hours on September 29. The Senate declined to pass the bill with measures to delay the Affordable Care Act, and the two legislative houses did not develop a compromise bill by the end of September 30, 2013, causing the federal government to shut down due to a lack of appropriated funds at the start of the new 2014 federal fiscal year. Also, on October 1, 2013, many aspects of the Affordable Care Act implementation took effect. The health insurance exchanges created by the Affordable Care Act launched as scheduled on October 1. Much of the Affordable Care Act is funded by previously authorized and mandatory spending, rather than discretionary spending, and the presence or lack of a continuing resolution did not affect it. Some of the law's funds also come from multiple-year and "no-year" discretionary funds that are not affected by a lack of a continuing resolution. Late in the evening of October 16, 2013, Congress passed the Continuing Appropriations Act, 2014, and President Obama signed it shortly after midnight on October 17, ending the government shutdown and suspending the debt limit until February 7, 2014.

According to a Washington Post/ABC News poll conducted shortly after the shutdown, 81% of Americans disapproved of the shutdown, 86% felt it had damaged the United States' image in the world, and 53% held Republicans in Congress accountable for the shutdown.

== Background ==
The United States Constitution requires government spending be approved in bills passed by the United States Congress. Some government functions such as the Federal Reserve System are completely self-funded. Others, like Social Security and Medicare, are partially self-funded but may be subject to administrative shutdowns and failures if the government fails to meet its financial obligations. Some programs are fully or partially funded for multiple years and some are funded every year.

The legislation that sets government spending is called appropriations legislation. Since the 1990s, Congress has often failed to pass the twelve to thirteen appropriation bills that set government-wide spending, often passing "continuing resolutions (CR)" to extend existing spending law at or near current levels, and "omnibus" bills that combine many appropriations bills into one. Budget negotiations can be difficult when the president is not of the party that controls one or both houses of Congress. The last budget was passed on April 29, 2009.

If the Congress fails to pass budgetary approval by the end of the fiscal year, a "funding gap" results. The Antideficiency Act requires government functions not excepted by the Act to begin shutting down immediately so that the Constitutional authority of Congress over spending is not breached. The Office of Management and Budget provides agencies with annual instructions on how to prepare for and operate during a funding gap according to the Antideficiency Act. Technically, seventeen federal government shutdowns precede the October 2013 shutdown. Most were partial or for single days or weekends and involved few if any furloughs. The first was in 1976. Only the shutdowns of 1995–96 involved the whole federal government and were longer than four days.

== Preceding events ==
=== Republicans' 2010 congressional victory ===
The tensions that would ultimately produce the 2013 shutdown began to take shape after Republicans, strengthened by the emergence of the Tea Party, won back a majority of the seats in the House of Representatives from the Democrats in 2010. Even at that time, some conservative activists and Tea Party-affiliated politicians were already calling on congressional Republicans to be willing to shut down the government in order to force congressional Democrats and the president to agree to deep cuts in spending and to repeal the Affordable Care Act, which had been signed into law only a few months earlier. Former speaker of the House Newt Gingrich, a Republican who had presided over Congress during the last government shutdowns 15 years earlier, said in April 2010 that if Republicans won back control of Congress in the 2010 election, they should remove any funding for the Affordable Care Act in any appropriations bills they passed. Gingrich said Republicans needed to "be ready to stand on principle" and should refuse to fund the new healthcare law even if their refusal would result in a shutdown of the government.

As the November 2010 congressional elections drew near, Rep. Lynn Westmoreland, a Republican from Georgia, said that if the Republicans won a majority of seats in the House, they would pass appropriation bills that the President would veto, leading to a government shutdown. Westmoreland told supporters: "We have put Band-Aids on some things that need to be cleaned out. That is going to take some pain. There's going to have to be some pain for us to do some things that we've got to do to right the ship." Sen. Mike Lee of Utah, then running for office as the Republican Party's nominee, said that although a shutdown would be frustrating for many and an inconvenience, it might be absolutely necessary to make it politically possible to restructure federal spending. Conservative political commentator Erick Erickson wrote, "I'm almost giddy thinking about a government shutdown next year. I cannot wait".

Although the November 2010 election left Republicans in control of the House, Democrats remained in control of the Senate and the White House, resulting in a division of power that would lead to a series of clashes over spending priorities and other policy matters. In early 2011, some Republicans threatened to force a shutdown unless the President and Democratic-controlled Senate agreed to much deeper spending cuts. Rep. Joe Walsh of Illinois said the country might need a government shutdown as a form of "shock therapy" to raise awareness of the state of the federal government's finances. Conservative activists held rallies in early 2011 urging Republican lawmakers to shut down the government if necessary to push Democrats to agree to Republican budgetary proposals. When Democrats said a government shutdown would have catastrophic effects on the economy and would hurt American families, many conservatives said Democrats were overstating the severity of the effects a shutdown would produce. A Gallup poll of public opinion showed that the majority of Republicans were in favor of shutting down the government rather than having congressional Republicans accept a compromise budget plan, while the majority of Americans overall (including majorities of Democrats and of independents) preferred that lawmakers reach a compromise deal. In April 2011, Republicans in the House of Representatives threatened to shut down the government unless the Senate and the President agreed to further spending cuts as well as to cuts in federal funding for Planned Parenthood and other birth-control providers and to curtailing the Environmental Protection Agency's authority to enforce the Clean Air Act and carbon dioxide emissions. House Republicans gave Speaker John Boehner an ovation when he informed them that he was advising the House Administration Committee to begin preparations for a possible shutdown. A budget deal was agreed to less than two hours before a shutdown would have begun.

Several similar funding crises resulting from disagreements over budgetary policy ensued in the following three years, with shutdowns being narrowly averted by last-minute deals each time. Congressional Republicans remained committed to eliminating or undermining the Affordable Care Act, taking more than 40 largely symbolic votes passing bills to repeal or defund the act which the Democratic-controlled Senate rejected or refused to consider.

=== Renewed efforts in 2013 ===
In January 2013, Republican senator John Cornyn of Texas wrote that "it may be necessary to partially shut down the government in order to secure the long-term fiscal well being of our country, rather than plod along the path of Greece, Italy and Spain." The New York Times later reported that, soon after Obama began his second term that month, a coalition of conservative activists led by former Reagan administration attorney general Ed Meese (who is also an emeritus fellow of the conservative think tank The Heritage Foundation), began developing plans to defund the Affordable Care Act. They strategized that they would be able to block implementation of the Affordable Care Act if they could persuade congressional Republicans to threaten cutting off financing for the entire federal government. Meese's coalition produced a "blueprint to defunding Obamacare". The plan, which said "Conservatives should not approve a CR [continuing resolution] unless it defunds Obamacare," was signed by leaders of more than three dozen conservative groups.

As reported by The New York Times, conservative activists, supported by funds from the billionaire Koch brothers and conservative political action committees, worked with Tea Party–affiliated members of Congress, such as senators Ted Cruz and Mike Lee, to promote an appropriations bill that would exclude funds for the Affordable Care Act. (Note: The tax-exempt Freedom Partners, linked to the Koch brothers, distributed over $200 million in 2012 to non-profit organizations opposing the Affordable Care Act. Recipients included Heritage Action, Tea Party Patriots, and the Center to Protect Patient Rights. The Center to Protect Patient Rights in turn donated to groups calling themselves the "Repeal Coalition", including American Commitment and 60 Plus Association, which sent a letter in August urging Republicans to delay the Affordable Care Act in any budget deal. The group Conservative 50 Plus Alliance also sent a petition with over 68,000 signatures to the Senate. In response to statements made about the Koch brothers by Senate Majority Leader Harry Reid, Philip Ellender, Koch Industries president of government and public affairs, sent a letter to Senate offices on October 9, 2013, saying that Reid claimed "Koch was behind the shutdown of the federal government." According to the Los Angeles Times, Ellender sought to distance Koch Industries from the Koch brothers themselves, saying Koch Industries had not taken a position on the tactic of tying the continuing resolution to defund Obamacare. Sheila Krumholz said Ellender was technically correct in his effort to distinguish Koch Industries from the Koch brothers, but said "it's a distinction without a difference." The Los Angeles Times went on to mention the Koch brothers' connections to Americans for Prosperity, the Heritage Action Fund, and Freedom Partners.)

=== The Mark Meadows and Mike Lee letters ===
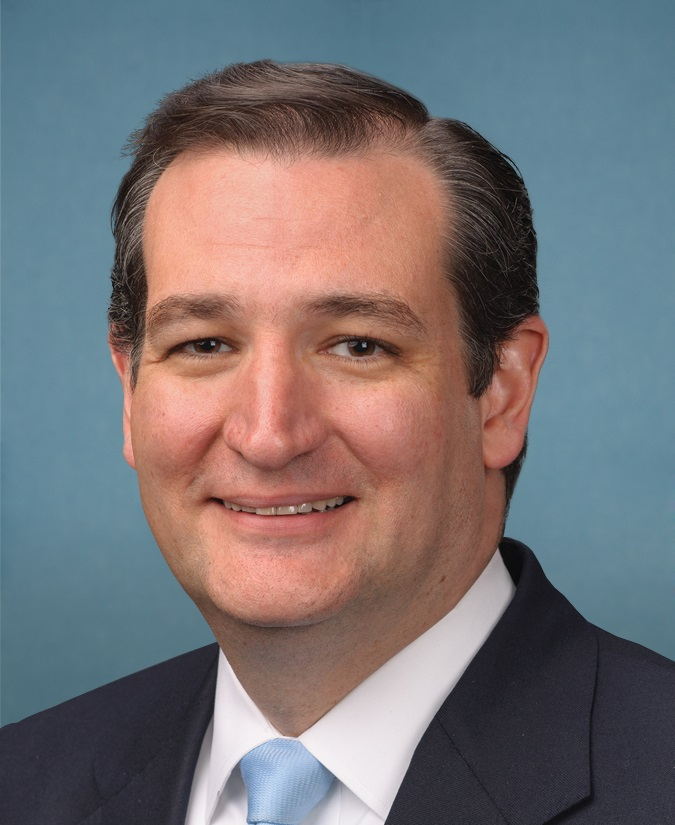
Sen. Ted Cruz

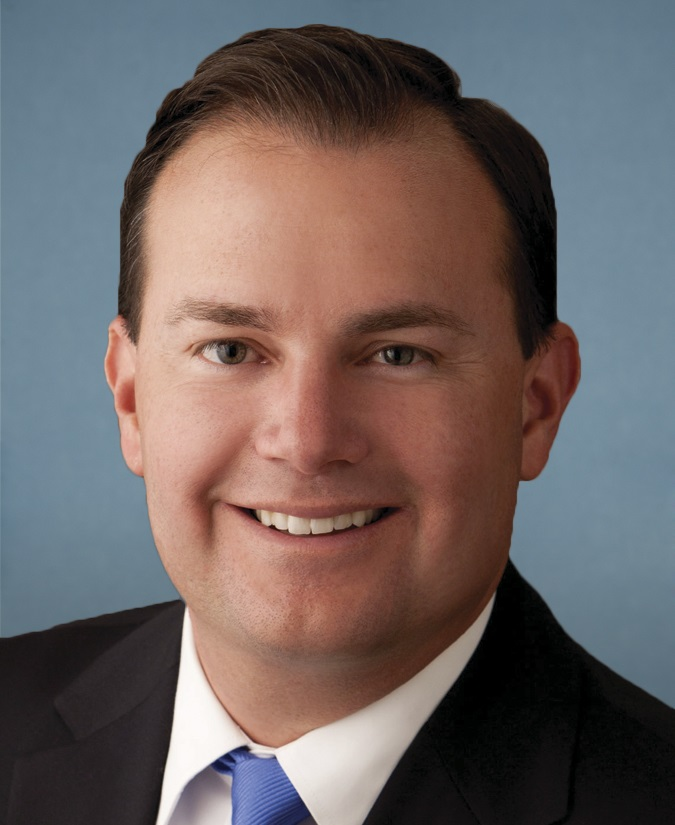
Sen. Mike Lee

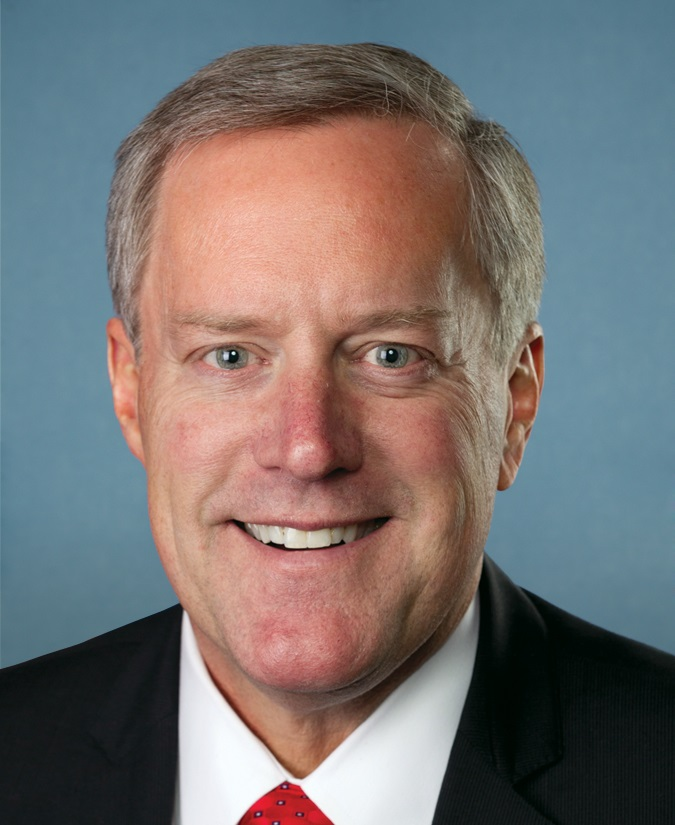
Rep. Mark Meadows

In July and August 2013, Sen. Mike Lee, along with fellow Tea Party–affiliated senators Ted Cruz of Texas, Marco Rubio of Florida, and Rand Paul of Kentucky, lobbied their colleagues in the Senate to support a letter written by Lee calling for defunding the Affordable Care Act. The letter was eventually signed by 19 senators, although 5 of the co-signatories later withdrew their support.

Freshman representative Mark Meadows of North Carolina circulated a similar letter in the House of Representatives that was signed by 80 House members. The New York Daily News wrote that it was Meadows' letter that had put the federal government on the road to shutdown, noting that calls to defund the Affordable Care Act through spending bills languished until Meadows wrote an open letter on August 21, 2013, to House speaker John Boehner and Majority Leader Eric Cantor asking them to defund the Affordable Care Act in any appropriations bills brought to the House floor. CNN described Meadows as the "architect of the brink" for his letter.

Joshua Withrow of the Tea Party group FreedomWorks, which had endorsed the Meese coalition's plan months earlier, explained the overall strategy, writing in August 2013 that the continuing resolution due to expire September 30 "must be renewed in order for the doors to stay open in Washington. The CR is the best chance we will get to withdraw funds from Obamacare. This can be done by attaching bills by Senator Ted Cruz (R-TX) or Congressman Tom Graves (R-GA) to the CR, which will totally defund Obamacare." He added, "Senator Mike Lee (R-UT) and Congressman Mark Meadows (R-NC) are leading the charge to get their colleagues to commit to this approach, by putting their signatures to a letter affirming that they will refuse to vote for a CR that contains Obamacare funding...."

Senators who signed Sen. Mike Lee's letter

19 Senators, all Republicans, signed Mike Lee's letter

Signed the letter

- Jeffrey Chiesa (NJ)
- Mike Crapo (ID)
- Ted Cruz (TX)
- Mike Enzi (WY)
- Deb Fischer (NE)
- Chuck Grassley (IA)
- Jim Inhofe (OK)
- Mike Lee (UT)
- Rand Paul (KY)
- Jim Risch (ID)
- Pat Roberts (KS)
- Marco Rubio (FL)
- John Thune (SD)
- David Vitter (LA)

Signed but later withdrew support

- Kelly Ayotte (NH)
- John Boozman (AR)
- John Cornyn (TX)
- Mark Kirk (IL)
- Roger Wicker (MS)
Representatives who signed Rep. Mark Meadows' letter

80 Representatives, all Republicans, signed Mark Meadows' letter:

- Justin Amash (MI-3)
- Michele Bachmann (MN-6)
- Andy Barr (KY-6)
- Joe Barton (TX-6)
- Dan Benishek (MI-1)
- Kerry Bentivolio (MI-11)
- Gus Bilirakis (FL-12)
- Rob Bishop (UT-1)
- Diane Black (TN-6)
- Jim Bridenstine (OK-1)
- Mo Brooks (AL-5)
- Paul Broun (GA-10)
- Bill Cassidy (LA-6)
- Steve Chabot (OH-1)
- Howard Coble (NC-6)
- Doug Collins (GA-9)
- Mike Conaway (TX-11)
- Paul Cook (CA-8)
- Rick Crawford (AR-1)
- Steve Daines (MT-AL)
- Rodney Davis (IL-13)
- Ron DeSantis (FL-6)
- Jeff Duncan (SC-3)
- Jimmy Duncan (TN-2)
- Blake Farenthold (TX-27)
- Chuck Fleischmann (TN-3)
- John Fleming (LA-4)
- Bill Flores (TX-17)
- Trent Franks (AZ-8)
- Phil Gingrey (GA-11)
- Louie Gohmert (TX-1)
- Paul Gosar (AZ-4)
- Sam Graves (MO-6)
- Tom Graves (GA-14)
- Tim Griffin (AR-2)
- Ralph Hall (TX-4)
- George Holding (NC-13)
- Richard Hudson (NC-8)
- Tim Huelskamp (KS-1)
- Bill Huizenga (MI-2)
- Randy Hultgren (IL-14)
- Walter B. Jones Jr. (NC-3)
- Jim Jordan (OH-4)
- Steve King (IA-4)
- Jack Kingston (GA-1)
- Raul Labrador (ID-1)
- Doug LaMalfa (CA-1)
- Doug Lamborn (CO-5)
- Cynthia Lummis (WY-AL)
- Kenny Marchant (TX-24)
- Tom Marino (PA-10)
- Thomas Massie (KY-4)
- Tom McClintock (CA-4)
- Luke Messer (IN-6)
- Mick Mulvaney (SC-5)
- Randy Neugebauer (TX-19)
- Steven Palazzo (MS-4)
- Steve Pearce (NM-2)
- Scott Perry (PA-4)
- Joe Pitts (PA-16)
- Ted Poe (TX-2)
- Mike Pompeo (KS-4)
- Bill Posey (FL-8)
- Phil Roe (TN-1)
- Todd Rokita (IN-4)
- Keith Rothfus (PA-12)
- Matt Salmon (AZ-5)
- Steve Scalise (LA-1)
- Aaron Schock (IL-18)
- David Schweikert (AZ-6)
- Jim Sensenbrenner (WI-5)
- Jason Smith (MO-8)
- Steve Stockman (TX-36)
- Marlin Stutzman (IN-3)
- Tim Walberg (MI-7)
- Jackie Walorski (IN-2)
- Randy Weber (TX-14)
- Brad Wenstrup (OH-2)
- Joe Wilson (SC-2)
- Ted Yoho (FL-3)

Conservative groups ran negative media campaigns to pressure congressional Republicans who had doubted the strategy into supporting it. Republican Richard Burr, the senior senator from North Carolina, called threatening a shutdown over the Affordable Care Act "the dumbest idea I've ever heard of". In response, the Senate Conservatives Fund bought a radio ad against Burr. The fund also ran radio ads against Republican Senators for not joining the effort to defund the Affordable Care Act, including Lindsey Graham of South Carolina, Lamar Alexander of Tennessee, Johnny Isakson of Georgia, and Thad Cochran of Mississippi. Heritage Action (which opened operations in North Carolina in January 2011), ran critical Internet ads in the districts of 100 Republican lawmakers who did not sign Meadows' letter. Support for the plan spread among Republican congressional leaders. Referring to Meadows' letter, David Wasserman of the nonpartisan Cook Political Report told The New York Times, "They've been hugely influential. When else in our history has a freshman member of Congress from North Carolina been able to round up a gang of 80 that's essentially ground the government to a halt?"

In August and September 2013, Heritage Action, Tea Party Patriots, ForAmerica, and five other Tea Party groups embarked on nationwide tours to pressure Republican members of Congress to join the effort to defund the Affordable Care Act. In early September, Tea Party Patriots created a defunding "tool kit", which included talking points in case House Republicans were blamed for a shutdown. The suggested answer was "We are simply calling to fund the entire government except for the Affordable Care Act/Obamacare."

=== September 2013 ===
With Congress having failed to agree by late September 2013 on the budget for the fiscal year beginning October 1, members of the Senate proposed a resolution to continue funding the government at sequestration levels through December 2013 as a stop-gap measure, to allow more time to negotiate over final funding levels for the full fiscal year.

Republican senators Ted Cruz, Mike Lee, and others then demanded a delay of or change to the Affordable Care Act in exchange for passing the resolution. On September 24, Cruz gave a 21-hour speech in the Senate to draw attention to his goals.

As the shutdown loomed on September 27, The Washington Post reported that several Republican members of Congress made public statements expressing approval of the impending shutdown. Rep. Michele Bachmann said "We're very excited. It's exactly what we wanted, and we got it. People will be very grateful." Rep. John Culberson said "It's wonderful. We're 100 percent united!" In an interview with Fox news host Sean Hannity, Bachmann said that she believes there has been "strong unity" between conservatives on almost every budget vote. Bachmann said: "This is about the happiest I've seen members in a long time, because we see we are starting to win this dialogue on a national level."

Bachmann later disputed having made such a statement about being happy the government was shut down, telling CNN that she had been misquoted by the 'Washington Post'. She provided a full quotation, and a recording of the statement, indicating the statement was about excitement for the opportunity to vote on delaying the Affordable Care Act funding and implementation by a year.

On September 30, the Republican-led House sent many proposals to continue funding the government through December while delaying or blocking the Affordable Care Act, each of which were blocked by the Democratic-led Senate. Even if the Senate had agreed to House demands, President Obama threatened to veto any bill that would delay the Affordable Care Act.

With only an hour before the start of the shutdown, Republicans in the House attempted to start budget conference-committee negotiations. Senate Democrats, who had attempted to start such negotiations 18 times since January and been stopped by the Republicans each time, balked: Senate majority leader Harry Reid stated, "We will not go to conference with a gun to our head," while Senate Budget Committee chairwoman Patty Murray criticized the move as an attempt by Speaker Boehner "to distract from his constantly changing list of demands."

Some Republicans began to re-frame the shutdown battle in purely political rather than policy terms, with Indiana representative Marlin Stutzman telling the conservative Washington Examiner on October 1, "We have to get something out of this. And I don't know what that even is."

== The shutdown ==
=== House legislative rule for the Appropriations Continuing Resolution ===
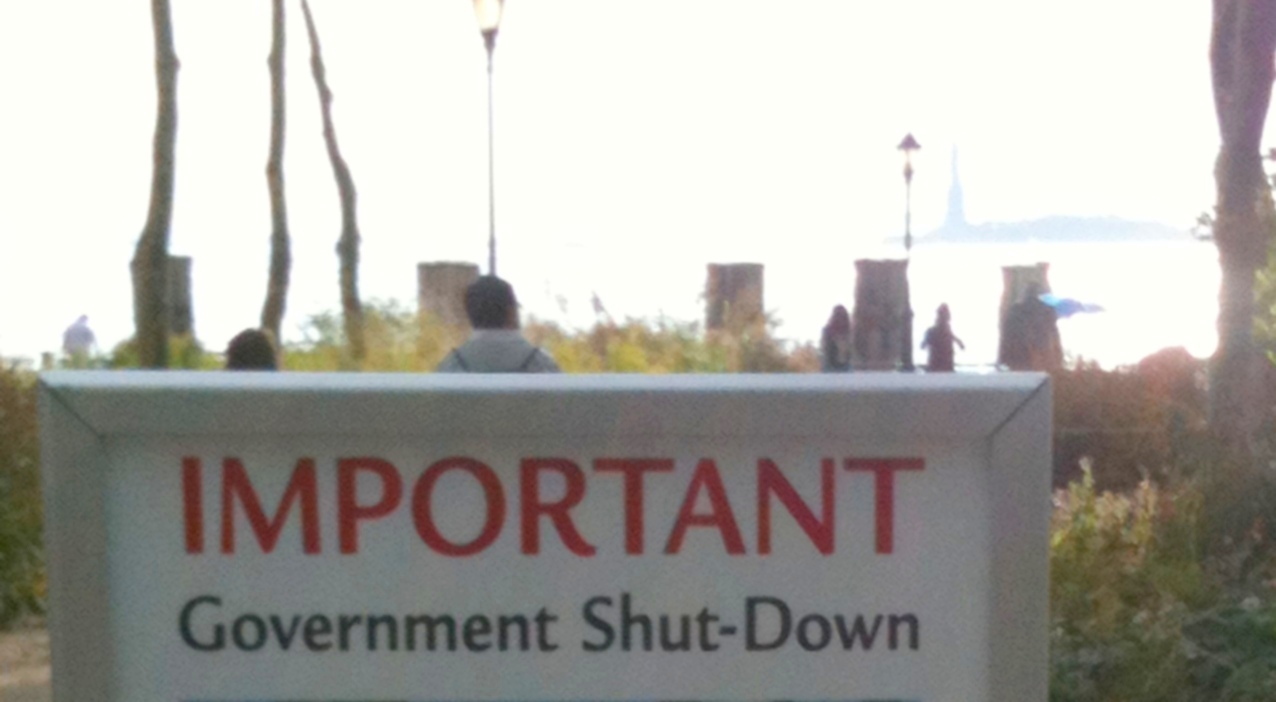
A government shutdown notice posted on October 1, 2013

A new rule for the consideration of the Senate's amended version of the continuing resolution was approved by the House October 1, 2013, at 1:10 AM (legislative day September 30). The rule, House Resolution 368, was reported to the House floor for a vote by the chairman of the House Rules Committee, Rep. Pete Sessions (R-TX-32), and the vote had 228 voting for the resolution (221 R. and 7 D.) and 199 (9 R. and 190 D.) against adoption of the rule.

H.Res. 368 changed the Standing Rule for the procedure for consideration of the Continuing Resolution (H.J. Res. 59). It states that "any motion pursuant to clause 4 of rule XXII relating to House Joint Resolution 59 may be offered only by the Majority Leader or his designee," which at the time was Eric Cantor or his designee, H.J. Res. 59 being the bill returned from the Senate to end the shutdown with continuing appropriations for fiscal year 2014.

During the October 1 debate on H.Res 368, Rep. Louise Slaughter said to Rep. Pete Sessions that "under regular order of the House", anyone "can call for a vote on the Senate proposal", but he had changed it so that "only the majority leader can do it". Sessions said, "that is correct," adding that they are not "trying to make a decision", and that a call for a vote could have taken place "almost effective immediately". After some back-and-forth, Sessions said that there could have been a call for a vote "at any time". Slaughter said, "I think you've taken that away". Sessions said, "We took that away". Slaughter said, "Oh, mercy. It gets deeper and deeper".

On October 12, 2013, Maryland representative Chris Van Hollen moved to bring the bill directly to the floor and made a parliamentary inquiry, and required that the chair explain that the rule previously agreed for the bill had changed the Standing Rules so that no House member could move to consider a vote on the appropriations bill, except for the Republican Majority Leader or his designee. Once the shutdown had begun on October 1, a group of 30–40 Republicans in the House continued to pressure House speaker John Boehner to refuse to allow a vote on any funding resolution that would not block or further delay the Affordable Care Act.

=== Unsuccessful attempts to restore funding ===
Several media organizations reported that House Democrats were ready to join with moderate House Republicans to pass a clean continuing resolution without amendments to defund the Affordable Care Act (18 Republicans and all 200 Democrats would have been needed to pass the resolution). House speaker John Boehner initially would not allow a vote on such a resolution.

==== Mini-appropriations bills in House ====
On October 2, the House of Representatives proposed several piecemeal bills to fund national parks and museums, the National Institutes of Health, and the city of Washington, D.C. After initially failing to reach 2/3 majority needed to suspend the rules, all three passed the House with bipartisan support. The Senate leadership and the President rejected these efforts, arguing that they represented an attempt to reduce political pressure on the Republicans to resolve the shutdown by funding a few politically popular agencies while ignoring other important services. The piecemeal bill for the NIH was criticized as an interference on the interlocking roles and responsibilities of public health agencies.

Over the next week, House Republicans continued this strategy with piecemeal bills for the United States Department of Veterans Affairs, Special Supplemental Nutrition Program for Women, Infants and Children (WIC), and Federal Emergency Management Agency (FEMA). These bills continued to be opposed by most congressional Democrats and ignored by the Senate in favor of passing one full continuing resolution.

- The National Institutes of Health Continuing Appropriations Resolution, 2014 passed the House on October 2, 2013. The bill would have provided funding for the National Institutes of Health, the primary agency of the United States government responsible for biomedical and health-related research.
- The District of Columbia Continuing Appropriations Resolution, 2014 passed the House on October 2, 2013, and would have provided funding for Washington, D.C.
- The National Park Service Operations, Smithsonian Institution, National Gallery of Art, and United States Holocaust Memorial Museum Continuing Appropriations Resolution, 2014 passed the House on October 2, 2013. The bill would have provided funding for the National Park Service, which is the United States federal agency that manages all national parks, many national monuments, and other conservation and historical properties. It would also have provided funding for the Smithsonian Institution, a group of museums and research centers, and other major museums affected by the shutdown.
- The Pay Our Guard and Reserve Act (H.R. 3230) passed the House on October 3, 2013. The bill would have provided funding for the "reserve components of the Armed Forces", a list which is defined as including the Army National Guard of the United States, the Army Reserve, the Navy Reserve, the Marine Corps Reserve, the Air National Guard of the United States, the Air Force Reserve, and the Coast Guard Reserve. The Congressional Budget Office reported the bill would result in a budget authority of $5.0 billion.
- The Veterans Benefits Continuing Appropriations Resolution, 2014 passed the House on October 3, 2013, and would have provided funds for the United States Department of Veterans Affairs to pay Veterans benefits and for the GI bill.
- The Special Supplemental Nutrition Program for Women, Infants, and Children Continuing Appropriations Resolution, 2014 passed the House on October 4, 2013, and would have provided funding for the Special Supplemental Nutrition Program for Women, Infants and Children, a federal assistance program of the Food and Nutrition Service (FNS) of the United States Department of Agriculture (USDA) for healthcare and nutrition of low-income pregnant women, breastfeeding women, and infants and children under the age of five.
- The Federal Emergency Management Agency Continuing Appropriations Resolution, 2014 passed the House on October 4, 2013, and would have provided funding for the Federal Emergency Management Agency, which is responsible for coordinating a response to disasters that occur in the United States and that overwhelm the resources of local and state authorities.
- The Food and Drug Administration Continuing Appropriations Resolution, 2014 passed the House on October 7, 2013. The bill would have provided funding for the Food and Drug Administration at the annual rate of $2.3 billion, the same funding it received in FY 2013.
- The Head Start Continuing Appropriations Resolution, 2014 passed the House on October 8, 2013. The bill would have provided funding for the Head Start Program, a program of the United States Department of Health and Human Services that provides comprehensive education, health, nutrition, and parent involvement services to low-income children and their families.

==== Collins proposal ====
On October 11, Senator Susan Collins (R-ME) developed a proposal to lift the debt ceiling and end the shutdown. Democrats in the Senate rejected this proposal because it would have locked sequestration budget cuts into law for the next six months. Democratic senators wanted to negotiate an end to sequestration before then.

=== Debt ceiling ===
Analysts were concerned that the political gridlock would extend into mid-October, when Congress and the president must agree to raise the debt ceiling to avoid the prospect of defaulting on the public debt. Following the debate over the debt ceiling in May 2013, the Treasury Department was forced to engage in extraordinary measures to fund the government. In August 2013, the Treasury informed Congress that the extraordinary measures would be insufficient starting in mid-October and further specified, in late September, that the U.S. would begin to default on its debts if a new debt ceiling was not approved by October 17. On October 2, President Obama explicitly linked the government shutdown to the debt ceiling issue, stating that he would not reopen budget negotiations until Republicans agreed to passage of a bill raising the debt limit. On October 7, the Moody's bond credit rating agency released a memo stating that it was unlikely the U.S. would risk a default on its public debt, and that the nation instead "would continue to pay interest and principal on its debt". The memo further stated that the financial situation was more serious in 2011 than the 2013 problem. However, such prioritizing of debt payments over all other needs would require that the government default on many other payment obligations, likely including a wide array of business contracts, employee salaries, social insurance benefits, and other programs. The Council on Foreign Relations said that among the payments implicated were military wages, Medicare and Social Security payments, and unemployment support.

==== Potential effects ====
Yalman Onaran of Bloomberg News wrote that the government's failure to raise the debt ceiling and pay its debt would "halt a $5 trillion lending mechanism for investors who rely on Treasuries, blow up borrowing costs for billions of people and companies, ravage the dollar and throw the U.S. and world economies into a recession that probably would become a depression", noting that a government default would be 23 times larger than the Lehman Brothers bankruptcy during the Great Recession. On October 15, 2013, Fitch, the credit rating agency, placed the U.S. AAA ratings on "rating watch negative" as talks to increase the debt limit reached an impasse fueling concerns of congressional dysfunction and impending default.

Japanese finance minister Taro Aso said that the debt limit would have an "internationally significant impact". On how the US situation could affect Japan, he said "I think this could likely result in a situation where the dollar will be sold and the yen will be bought." The falling dollar is bad news for Japan's exporters, a key driver of growth in the world's third-largest economy, because it erodes their repatriated profits.

=== End of shutdown and temporary debt limit suspension ===
Following an unfruitful October 10 meeting between President Obama and House Republicans (including Boehner, Cantor, and House Budget Committee chair and former vice-presidential nominee Paul Ryan), Senate minority leader Mitch McConnell concluded that the Republican House leadership's strategy had gone "awry". McConnell began looking for suggestions from Republican senators like Lamar Alexander, who had already begun quietly negotiating with Democrat Chuck Schumer. Senators Schumer and Alexander came to an agreement on the 11th and scheduled a meeting between Senate majority leader Harry Reid and McConnell for the following day. By the evening of the October 14, Reid and McConnell had likewise reached an agreement.

Boehner persuaded McConnell to delay a Senate vote, in hopes of rallying his own caucus to end the shutdown on its own terms. Instead, both bills Boehner proposed failed to receive full caucus support, and Boehner elected not to bring the bills to the House floor. There were accusations by conservative Republican House members that moderate Republicans had "undercut" the position of more conservative party members. Republican representative Charlie Dent of Pennsylvania, in favor of a clean CR, said Congress should have passed a bill to fund the government without policy strings attached weeks earlier. Dent was quoted saying: "That's essentially what we're doing now. People can blame me all they want, but I was correct in my analysis and I'd say a lot of those folks were not correct in theirs."

Since Boehner was not willing to bring the two bills to the House floor without a majority of the Republican caucus supporting the bills, the House was at an impasse, and negotiating efforts within the Senate took the foreground. On October 16, Reid and McConnell advanced their proposal, which would fund the government through January 15 at sequestration levels and suspend the debt limit until February 7. The bill passed 81 to 18, with support from all of the Democrats in the Senate and 27 of the Republicans. Eighteen Republicans voted to oppose it.

Senate votes on the Reid–McConnell bill to end the shutdown

Republicans who voted in favor

- Lamar Alexander (TN)
- Kelly Ayotte (NH)
- John Barrasso (WY)
- Roy Blunt (MO)
- John Boozman (AR)
- Richard Burr (NC)
- Saxby Chambliss (GA)
- Jeffrey Chiesa (NJ)
- Dan Coats (IN)
- Thad Cochran (MS)
- Susan Collins (ME)
- Bob Corker (TN)
- Deb Fischer (NE)
- Jeff Flake (AZ)
- Lindsey Graham (SC)
- Orrin Hatch (UT)
- John Hoeven (ND)
- Johnny Isakson (GA)
- Mike Johanns (NE)
- Mark Kirk (IL)
- John McCain (AZ)
- Mitch McConnell (KY)
- Jerry Moran (KS)
- Lisa Murkowski (AK)
- Rob Portman (OH)
- John Thune (SD)
- Roger Wicker (MS)

Republicans who voted against

- Tom Coburn (OK)
- John Cornyn (TX)
- Mike Crapo (ID)
- Ted Cruz (TX)
- Mike Enzi (WY)
- Charles Grassley (IA)
- Dean Heller (NV)
- Ron Johnson (WI)
- Mike Lee (UT)
- Rand Paul (KY)
- Jim Risch (ID)
- Pat Roberts (KS)
- Marco Rubio (FL)
- Tim Scott (SC)
- Jeff Sessions (AL)
- Richard Shelby (AL)
- Pat Toomey (PA)
- David Vitter (LA)

Democrats who voted in favor

All 52 Senate Democrats voted in favor

Independents who voted in favor

- Angus King (ME)
- Bernie Sanders (VT)

Despite Republican efforts to strip the Affordable Care Act of funding or delay the law as part of a deal to reopen the government, the Senate plan's only concession to the Republican leadership on the issue was stricter income verification rules for citizens accessing the health insurance exchanges. With only hours to go before the government breached the debt limit, Speaker Boehner admitted defeat in a radio interview, stating, "We fought the good fight, we just didn't win," and furthermore said he would encourage House Republicans to vote in favor of the Senate plan, despite an informal rule against advancing bills lacking a majority of Republican support.

The House voted to approve the Senate's plan by 285 to 144. Democrats supported the bill unanimously, 198–0 with two Democrats not voting. The Republican vote was 87 to 144, with one not voting. Republican leaders Boehner, Cantor, Whip Kevin McCarthy, and Conference Chair Cathy McMorris Rodgers voted yes; Paul Ryan and Michele Bachmann voted no. President Obama signed the bill just after midnight on October 17, 2013.

House Republicans who voted for the compromise
- Spencer Bachus (AL)
- Lou Barletta (PA)
- Dan Benishek (MI)
- Gus Bilirakis (FL)
- John Boehner (OH)
- Charles Boustany (LA)
- Susan Brooks (IN)
- Vern Buchanan (FL)
- Ken Calvert (CA)
- Dave Camp (MI)
- Eric Cantor (VA)
- Shelley Moore Capito (WV)
- Howard Coble (NC)
- Mike Coffman (CO)
- Tom Cole (OK)
- Paul Cook (CA)
- Tom Cotton (AR)
- Kevin Cramer (ND)
- Rick Crawford (AR)
- Ander Crenshaw (FL)
- Steve Daines (MT)
- Rodney Davis (IL)
- Charlie Dent (PA)
- Mario Díaz-Balart (FL)
- Mike Fitzpatrick (PA)
- Jeff Fortenberry (NE)
- Rodney Frelinghuysen (NJ)
- Cory Gardner (CO)
- Jim Gerlach (PA)
- Chris Gibson (NY)
- Tim Griffin (AR)
- Mike Grimm (NY)
- Brett Guthrie (KY)
- Richard Hanna (NY)
- Gregg Harper (MS)
- Doc Hastings (WA)
- Joe Heck (NV)
- Jaime Herrera Beutler (WA)
- Darrell Issa (CA)
- Lynn Jenkins (KS)
- Dave Joyce (OH)
- Mike Kelly (PA)
- Peter King (NY)
- Adam Kinzinger (IL)
- John Kline (MN)
- Leonard Lance (NJ)
- Tom Latham (IA)
- Frank LoBiondo (NJ)
- Kevin McCarthy (CA)
- Patrick McHenry (NC)
- Buck McKeon (CA)
- David McKinley (WV)
- Cathy McMorris Rodgers (WA)
- Pat Meehan (PA)
- Gary Miller (CA)
- Tim Murphy (PA)
- Devin Nunes (CA)
- Erik Paulsen (MN)
- Robert Pittenger (NC)
- Dave Reichert (WA)
- Reid Ribble (WI)
- Scott Rigell (VA)
- Harold Rogers (KY)
- Mike Rogers (MI)
- Ileana Ros-Lehtinen (FL)
- Peter Roskam (IL)
- Jon Runyan (NJ)
- Aaron Schock (IL)
- John Shimkus (IL)
- Bill Shuster (PA)
- Mike Simpson (ID)
- Adrian Smith (NE)
- Chris Smith (NJ)
- Steve Stivers (OH)
- Lee Terry (NE)
- Glenn Thompson (PA)
- Pat Tiberi (OH)
- Scott Tipton (CO)
- Fred Upton (MI)
- David Valadao (CA)
- Daniel Webster (FL)
- Edward Whitfield (KY)
- Rob Wittman (VA)
- Frank Wolf (VA)
- Steve Womack (AR)
- Don Young (AK)
- Todd Young (IN)

Note: All the House Democrats voted for the compromise

House Republicans who voted against the compromise
- Robert Aderholt (AL)
- Justin Amash (MI)
- Mark Amodei (NV)
- Michele Bachmann (MN)
- Andy Barr (KY)
- Joe Barton (TX)
- Kerry Bentivolio (MI)
- Rob Bishop (UT)
- Diane Black (TN)
- Marsha Blackburn (TN)
- Kevin Brady (TX)
- Jim Bridenstine (OK)
- Mo Brooks (AL)
- Paul Broun (GA)
- Larry Bucshon (IN)
- Michael C. Burgess (TX)
- John Campbell (CA)
- John Carter (TX)
- Bill Cassidy (LA)
- Steve Chabot (OH)
- Jason Chaffetz (UT)
- Chris Collins (NY)
- Doug Collins (GA)
- K. Michael Conaway (TX)
- John Culberson (TX)
- Ron DeSantis (FL)
- Jeff Denham (CA)
- Scott Desjarlais (TN)
- Sean Duffy (WI)
- Jeff Duncan (SC)
- Jimmy Duncan (TN)
- Renee Ellmers (NC)
- Blake Farenthold (TX)
- Stephen Fincher (TN)
- Chuck Fleischmann (TN)
- John Fleming (LA)
- Bill Flores (TX)
- Randy Forbes (VA)
- Virginia Foxx (NC)
- Trent Franks (AZ)
- Scott Garrett (NJ)
- Bob Gibbs (OH)
- Phil Gingrey (GA)
- Louie Gohmert (TX)
- Bob Goodlatte (VA)
- Paul Gosar (AZ)
- Trey Gowdy (SC)
- Kay Granger (TX)
- Sam Graves (MO)
- Morgan Griffith (VA)
- Ralph Hall (TX)
- Andy Harris (MD)
- Vicky Hartzler (MO)
- Jeb Hensarling (TX)
- George Holding (NC)
- Richard Hudson (NC)
- Tim Huelskamp (KS)
- Bill Huizenga (MI)
- Randy Hultgren (IL)
- Duncan D. Hunter (CA)
- Robert Hurt (VA)
- Bill Johnson (OH)
- Sam Johnson (TX)
- Walter B. Jones Jr. (NC)
- Jim Jordan (OH)
- Steve King (IA)
- Jack Kingston (GA)
- Doug LaMalfa (CA)
- Raul Labrador (ID)
- Doug Lamborn (CO)
- James Lankford (OK)
- Robert E. Latta (OH)
- Billy Long (MO)
- Frank D. Lucas (OK)
- Blaine Luetkemeyer (MO)
- Cynthia M. Lummis (WY)
- Kenny Marchant (TX)
- Tom Marino (PA)
- Thomas Massie (KY)
- Michael McCaul (TX)
- Tom McClintock (CA)
- Mark Meadows (NC)
- Luke Messer (IN)
- John L. Mica (FL)
- Candice S. Miller (MI)
- Jeff Miller (FL)
- Markwayne Mullin (OK)
- Mick Mulvaney (SC)
- Randy Neugebauer (TX)
- Kristi Noem (SD)
- Richard Nugent (FL)
- Alan Nunnelee (MS)
- Pete Olson (TX)
- Steven Palazzo (MS)
- Steve Pearce (NM)
- Scott Perry (PA)
- Tom Petri (WI)
- Joe Pitts (PA)
- Ted Poe (TX)
- Mike Pompeo (KS)
- Bill Posey (FL)
- Tom Price (GA)
- Trey Radel (FL)
- Tom Reed (NY)
- Jim Renacci (OH)
- Tom Rice (SC)
- Martha Roby (AL)
- Phil Roe (TN)
- Mike D. Rogers (AL)
- Dana Rohrabacher (CA)
- Todd Rokita (IN)
- Tom Rooney (FL)
- Dennis Ross (FL)
- Keith Rothfus (PA)
- Ed Royce (CA)
- Paul Ryan (WI)
- Matt Salmon (AZ)
- Mark Sanford (SC)
- Steve Scalise (LA)
- David Schweikert (AZ)
- Austin Scott (GA)
- Jim Sensenbrenner (WI)
- Pete Sessions (TX)
- Jason Smith (MO)
- Lamar Smith (TX)
- Steve Southerland (FL)
- Chris Stewart (UT)
- Steve Stockman (TX)
- Marlin Stutzman (IN)
- Mac Thornberry (TX)
- Mike Turner (OH)
- Ann Wagner (MO)
- Tim Walberg (MI)
- Greg Walden (OR)
- Jackie Walorski (IN)
- Randy Weber (TX)
- Brad Wenstrup (OH)
- Lynn Westmoreland (GA)
- Roger Williams (TX)
- Joe Wilson (SC)
- Rob Woodall (GA)
- Kevin Yoder (KS)
- Ted Yoho (FL)

Many Republicans criticized the bill, with Ted Cruz calling it a "terrible deal" and Kentucky's Thomas Massie describing it as a "goose egg" for their party. McConnell, who was praised afterwards by some Democrats for his bipartisanship, defended himself from conservative critics, saying House failures had put him in a weak position and that the effort to defund the ACA through a shutdown was "not a smart play" and had "diverted our attention away from what was achievable".

== Effects ==
=== Domestic effects ===
==== Effect on federal government operations ====
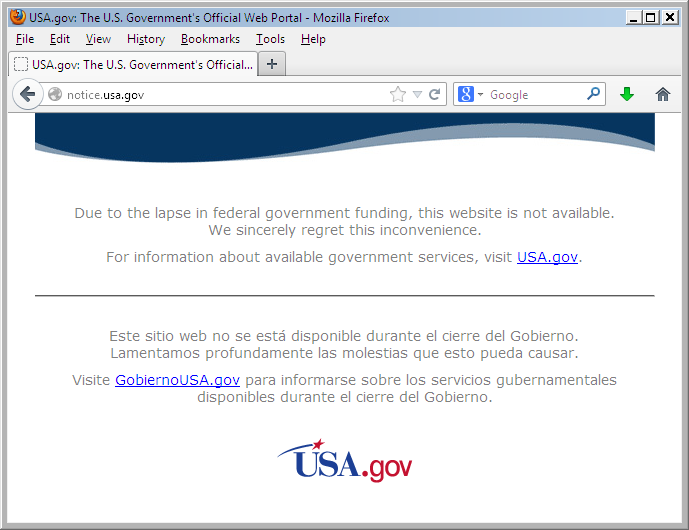
USA.gov website shutdown on October 15

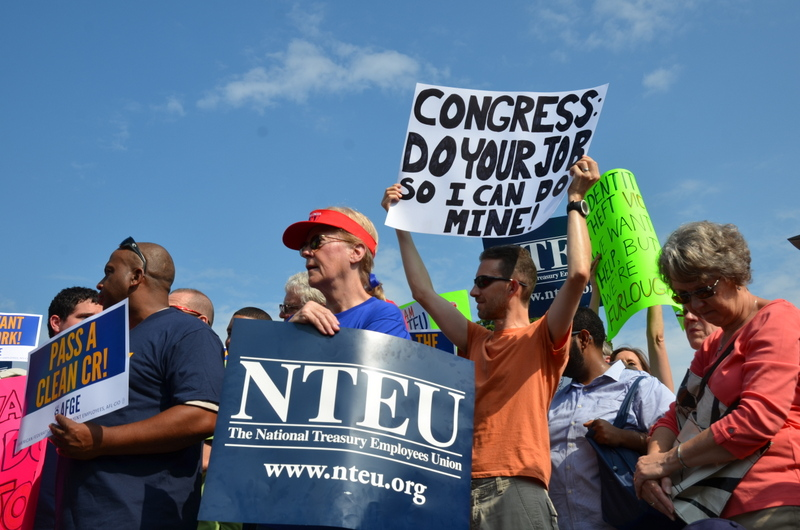
Federal employees protest the government shutdown at a rally outside of the Capitol

On September 17, 2013, Office of Management and Budget director Sylvia M. Burwell mandated an update for each federal agency's contingency plan that designated excepted agency operations, as required by the Antideficiency Act for a potential funding gap and shutdown. Burwell said that although the administration hoped that Congress would act to prevent a lapse in appropriations, "prudent management requires that agencies be prepared for the possibility of a lapse."

During the shutdown, most non-exempt government employees were furloughed. That would have put about 800,000 public employees on indefinite unpaid leave starting October 1. The White House estimated that a one-week shutdown could have cost the US economy $10 billion. Key government functions, such as air traffic control, stay active under emergency funding statutes, though other related functions (such as training and support of these services) would be suspended. Some agencies and departments—such as the United States Department of Veterans Affairs and Social Security Administration—are funded by long-term or mandatory appropriations and were also largely unaffected. While veteran and military benefits are funded a year in advance, furloughed civilians had a large impact on the military and their families. Services to families on bases ranging from commissaries to family and survivor counseling were affected. Since the United States Postal Service is self-funded, it was unaffected and continued normal operations. The United States Merchant Marine Academy was closed for operations during the shutdown massively impacting the curriculum and schedule.

On October 5, the House unanimously passed a bill that would provide back pay to all furloughed federal employees after the shutdown is resolved, and Obama stated that he would sign the bill into law. Rep. Elijah Cummings said "Our hard-working public servants should not become collateral damage. This is not their fault and they should not suffer as a result." Those responsible for the shutdown did not have to worry about their pay, however, as congressional salaries are written into permanent law. A bill to revise this passed in the Senate in 2011, but was never voted on by the House of Representatives.

==== Internal Revenue Service delays ====
As a result of the shutdown, the IRS's processing of returns and issuing of refunds were expected to be delayed by one week in January 2014. Taxpayer audits were postponed by the IRS during the shutdown. However, tax returns due on October 15 remained due on that deadline. Due to the 16-day federal government closure, "to allow adequate time to program and test tax processing systems", the IRS 2014 filing season, for accepting and processing 2013 individual tax returns, would start no earlier than January 28, 2014, and no later than February 4, 2014.

==== Effects on non-profit organizations ====
The 2013 ArtPrize in Michigan was affected by the shutdown due to several entries being displayed in and around the Gerald R. Ford Presidential Museum, part of the National Archives, which was affected in the shutdown.

The Fall 2013 Chincoteague Pony Round-up on Assateague Island, inside the Chincoteague National Wildlife Refuge, was postponed indefinitely by the ponies' caretakers.

EarthSpan, which tracks vital details about the diseases and migrations of the peregrine falcon, was unable to conduct its yearly survey due to the shutdown of Assateague in Maryland. This created a huge hole in disease tracking and species recovery data—the first year without data since the organization began tracking in the 1970s.

==== Effect on businesses ====
Defense contractors and some manufacturers the government hired experienced disruptions as the shutdown prevented those companies from delivering goods and receiving payments for work already done. United Technologies announced that if the shutdown was not resolved by October 7, it would furlough 2,000 employees at a military helicopter manufacturing subsidiary, Sikorsky Aircraft. Another 2,000 United Technologies employees would have been furloughed if the shutdown lasted beyond October 14 and an additional 1,000 if the shutdown lasted into November. Another United Technologies subsidiary, Pratt & Whitney, a manufacturer of aircraft engines, was also affected. The Sikorsky and Pratt & Whitney factories require civilian employees from the Defense Contract Management Agency to approve their products before they can be delivered to the government. Those Defense Department employees were furloughed. Similarly, Lockheed Martin announced plans to furlough 3,000 employees on October 7. Those employees work at government facilities or require government inspectors to complete their jobs. Lockheed said that the number of employees furloughed would increase if the shutdown continued.

Small businesses faced delays in receiving loans from the Small Business Administration. Many of these companies needed to turn to alternative funding sources that charged much higher interest rates. One alternative source of credit, merchant cash advances, charge interest rates of between 40% and 100%.

Since U.S. Customs and Border Protection, the agency which regulates trade and inspects cargoes, had not shut down, imports and exports continued. However, many products require approval from other agencies before they can be brought into or out of the country. With many of these regulators furloughed, importers and exporters experienced delays. For instance, furloughs at the Environmental Protection Agency resulted in a halt to all imports of pesticides to the United States. Imports of lumber and steel were also delayed as were exports of semiconductor manufacturing equipment. Airbus was unable to deliver new airplanes to the airlines JetBlue and US Airways because Federal Aviation Administration personnel who certify airplanes were furloughed.

==== Effect on Native Americans ====
Although the Bureau of Indian Affairs continued to run programs during the shutdown that were deemed essential, including firefighting and police services, it stopped financing tribal governments as well as many programs, grants, and services that provide necessary support for often-impoverished reservations. The cuts shut down programs that provide income, medical care, food, transportation, domestic violence protection, and foster care to communities, resulting in a sense of fear among many people who rely on these services. Some tribes were able to continue funding programs temporarily themselves, but others had to suspend programs immediately. For example, the Crow Tribe of Montana furloughed 364 employees, more than a third of its workforce, and suspended programs providing health care, bus services and improvements to irrigation. The Yurok tribe of Northern California, which relies almost exclusively on federal funds, furloughed 60 out of its 310 employees, closed its child care center, and cut off emergency financial assistance to the poor and elderly. The Yurok Indian Reservation had an unemployment rate exceeding 80% before the shutdown. In Minnesota, the Red Lake Band of Chippewa were supposed to receive $1 million from the Bureau of Indian Affairs to help operate their government, but were not given access to the money before the shutdown and were forced to halt all non-emergency medical procedures. The White Buffalo Calf Woman Society, a domestic violence shelter that serves the Rosebud Indian Reservation and surrounding communities in South Dakota, lost 90% of its funding due to the shutdown and was forced to turn victims away.

==== Effect on the District of Columbia ====
The local budget of Washington, D.C., is set by the elected district government but must be approved by Congress. As a result, local government functions, such as neighborhood trash collection and motor vehicle services, can be affected by a federal government shutdown. In past lapses in congressional appropriations, the city has shut down government services in a manner similar to the federal agencies. However, during the 2013 shut down, the district government remained operational using reserve funds already approved by Congress. As a contingency, the mayor of the District of Columbia informed the Obama administration that all local government personnel are excepted, meaning that they would have continued to work even if the District government had exhausted its reserve funds.

The District of Columbia also suspended payments to healthcare providers and managed care organizations that provide services to the city's 220,000 low-income and disabled residents who qualify for Medicaid. The district's contingency funds, which were used to keep other city services open during the shutdown, were not sufficient to pay the $89.2 million owed to insurers and the $23 million a week owed to healthcare providers.

A bill introduced by Republican Darrell Issa of California and passed by the House Oversight and Government Reform Committee would allow the district to spend its own local revenues independent of Congress. If the measure becomes law, it would prevent the district government from shutting down in the event of a lapse in federal appropriations.

The District of Columbia Continuing Appropriations Resolution, 2014 (H.J.Res. 71) is a continuing resolution that was passed by the House on October 2, 2013, that would provide funding for the district. The Senate refused to vote on any of the House's mini-appropriations bills, including this one. On October 9, D.C. mayor Vincent C. Gray confronted Senate majority leader Harry Reid and asked him to consider supporting the House bill which passed a day earlier, arguing that D.C. should be able to "spend [its] own money". The same day, Eleanor Holmes Norton, the District's non-voting delegate to the House of Representatives, asked the same of President Obama.

The District of Columbia Superior Court, which is operated by the federal government, remains largely open during a shutdown but will delay payments to witnesses, jurors, court-appointed lawyers, language interpreters and others until after appropriations are restored.

==== Effect on asylum and immigration ====
The federal shutdown interfered in the legal procedures on pending immigration cases. 16 immigration courts out of 58 were closed, and, as a result, political asylum cases were delayed in the US immigration system that already experienced a backlog of work.

The U.S. Citizenship and Immigration Services that processes immigration paperwork was hardly impacted, because the agencies are primarily self-funded by fees. In terms of immigration regulation and border control, US Immigration and Customs Enforcement (ICE) and the Department of Homeland Security were also not impacted by the shutdown, and continued to operate on the nation's priority according to Gillian Christensen, the spokesperson of ICE.

The shutdown also interfered with the Prison Rape Elimination Act-mandated reporting of incidents of sexual abuse and assault in immigration centers, of which there were 215 allegations from October 2009 through March 2013 according to the Government Accountability Office. Previously, a GAO report had recommended that the Department of Homeland Security develop additional controls to ensure reporting of incidents. Human Rights Watch has documented the problem of sexual abuse in detention facilities, noting the "assaults, abuses, and episodes of harassment have quietly emerged as a pattern across the rapidly expanding national immigration detention system."

==== Effect on shelters for domestic violence victims ====
Across the United States, shelters for domestic abuse victims had trouble paying bills as federal funds were unavailable; some asked for donations. Municipal and state funds made up for some funding in states such as New York and Montana; others like the YWCA in Flint, Michigan, had no access to back-up municipal or state funds. In Daphne, Alabama, the director of the Lighthouse, a domestic violence shelter, asked the city for emergency funds; even once the shutdown was over, shelters experienced delay in funding due to the slow process of receiving funds. Ironically, October 1, the day the government shutdown began, was the first day of Domestic Violence Awareness Month.

==== Effect on Title IX and Clery Act investigations ====
During the federal government shutdown, the Office of Civil Rights, a unit at the Department of Education responsible for handling sexual assault cases on college campuses ceased investigating claims of Title IX and Clery Act violations. The Clery Act is a federal law that requires full public reporting of campus crime. Title IX is a federal civil rights law which protects people from discrimination based on sex in education programs or activities which receive federal financial assistance. Title IX recognizes sexual harassment of students as form of discrimination and compels schools not only to respond immediately and appropriately to complaints of sexual harassment but to eliminate sexual harassment. The federal government shutdown has caused investigations of alleged violations of Title IX and the Clery Act to be halted at Dartmouth, The University of Colorado at Boulder, the University of North Carolina at Chapel Hill, Occidental College, Swarthmore College and the University of Southern California.

==== Effect on programs for children ====
The government shutdown caused as many as 19,000 children to lose access to The Head Start Program, which provides comprehensive education, nutritious meals, and medical screenings to low-income children. More than 20 programs across 11 states did not get the annual grant they had been scheduled to receive. This came two months after budget reductions due to the federal sequester cut funding for more than 57,000 children in the Head Start Program. On October 8, 2013, John D. Arnold and his wife Laura donated $10 million to the National Head Start Association in response to the continuing government shutdown. Their donation helped to pay for programs in Alabama, Connecticut, Florida, Georgia, South Carolina, and Mississippi, the six states with programs that were either already closed or were about to close due to lack of funds. If funding is fully restored, the money will be repaid to the Arnolds as though it were a no-interest loan.

=== Effects on United States foreign policy ===
==== Asia-Pacific ====
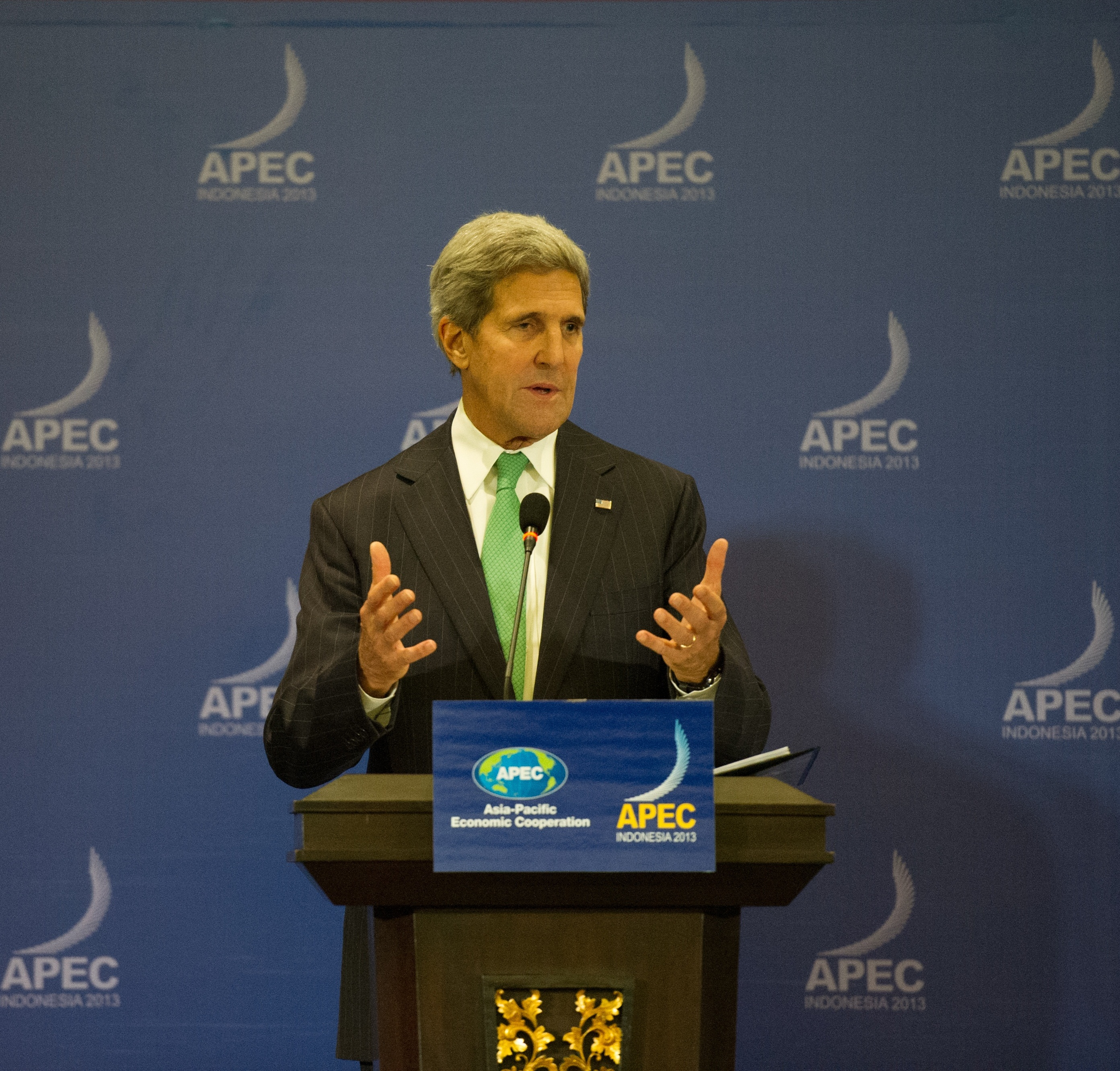
Due to the shutdown, U.S. secretary of state John Kerry took over President Barack Obama's seat at the 2013 Asia-Pacific Economic Cooperation (APEC) summit, where he reassured world leaders about the robustness of America's democracy.

On October 4, the White House announced that Obama's trip to Brunei, Malaysia, the Philippines and Indonesia, where he was scheduled to attend the 2013 Asia-Pacific Economic Cooperation meeting in Bali, would be cancelled due to the government shutdown. However, U.S. secretary of state John Kerry, who traveled in his place, asserted that "none of what is happening in Washington diminishes one iota our commitment to our partners in Asia". Speaking to world leaders at the APEC forum, Kerry remarked: "This is an example, really, of the robustness of our democracy." In addition, the Obama administration's efforts to push forward the proposed Trans-Pacific Strategic Economic Partnership trade pact with eleven other countries, was compromised.

==== Europe ====
On October 4, U.S. trade representative Michael Froman announced that a scheduled meeting with European Union diplomats regarding the proposed Transatlantic Free Trade Area (TAFTA) would be postponed as U.S. officials could not travel to Brussels.

=== Economic effect ===
Moody's Analytics estimated that a shutdown of three to four weeks would cost the economy about $55 billion. Lost wages of Federal employees will amount to about $1 billion a week. Goldman Sachs estimated that a three-week shutdown would reduce the gross domestic product of the United States by 0.9%. According to the Los Angeles Times, a two-week shutdown would reduce GDP growth in the fourth quarter by 0.3 to 0.4 percentage points. By comparison, the GDP has grown by less than 2% in 2013.

The negative economic effect of the shutdown will be particularly severe in the Washington, D.C. metropolitan area. Approximately 700,000 D.C. area jobs could be affected at a cost of $200 million a day. The State of Maryland predicted that it would lose approximately $5 million a day in tax revenue.

Local communities across the country are also seeing a significant negative economic effect, particularly those communities that are heavily dependent on the Federal government. A press release from the National Park Service said the shutdown of national parks would result in losses of $76 million a day in tourism-related sales among local communities, but during the government shutdown the National Park Service website was unavailable. During the month of October, tourists spend about $2.7 million a day at the Grand Canyon National Park and other National Parks in Arizona. Xanterra Parks and Resorts, a concessioner which operates hotels, restaurants and other visitor services in 21 national parks, reported that it was losing $1 million in revenue each day because the parks have closed. Several owners of tourist-oriented businesses located near national parks told NBC News that they were experiencing cancellations and declines in traffic that threatened their livelihoods. Julie Fox, a cafe owner in Moab, Utah (outside Arches National Park) said "Twenty percent of my yearly income comes from October and May. If it's anything like last time – 21 days – I'll lay off eight out of twelve people. It'll be like the dead of winter here."

== Reactions ==
=== Domestic political ===
The White House proposed a budget that funded discretionary spending at $1.203 trillion. The continuing resolution provides $986 billion. According to Ezra Klein of The Washington Post, while the Obama administration was willing to accept this significantly lower level of spending, it felt that a new demand by House Republicans to delay or defund the Act represented "nothing less than an effort to use the threat of a financial crisis to nullify the results of the last election." Klein continued: "As the White House sees it, Speaker John Boehner has begun playing politics as game of Calvinball, in which Republicans invent new rules on the fly and then demand the media and the Democrats accept them as reality and find a way to work around them." According to Klein, President Obama believes that "he will be handing his successor a fatally weakened office, and handing the American people an unacceptable risk of future financial crises, if he breaks, or even bends, in the face of Republican demands."

President Barack Obama said he would not cave in to "ideological" demands, stating, "A shutdown will have a very real economic impact on real people, right away." Obama blamed Republicans for the shutdown, stating of House Republicans, "One faction, of one party, in one house of Congress, in one branch of government, shut down major parts of the government – all because they didn't like one law." On October 2, Obama explicitly linked the government shutdown to the debt ceiling issue, stating that he would not reopen budget talks until Republicans pass a bill raising the debt limit. While there have been several government shutdowns in the history of the United States, Obama said, "No Congress before this one has ever, ever, in history been irresponsible enough to threaten default, to threaten an economic shutdown, to suggest America not pay its bills, just to try to blackmail a president into giving them some concessions on issues that have nothing to do with a budget." Obama also said that money in politics and Citizens United contributed to the shutdown, saying, "You have some ideological extremist who has a big bankroll, and they can entirely skew our politics."

House minority leader Nancy Pelosi referred to the event as the "Tea Party Shutdown" and described the House Republicans who passed a bill linking the new budget with defunding the Affordable Care Act "legislative arsonists." Senate minority leader Mitch McConnell called the shutdown the prize of the Democratic leaders in Congress.

On October 7, 2013, in an interview on MSNBC, Senator Bernie Sanders stated, "The real issue here, if you look at the Koch Brothers' agenda, is: look at what many of the extreme right-wing people believe. Obamacare is just the tip of the iceberg. These people want to abolish the concept of the minimum wage, they want to privatize the Veteran's Administration, they want to privatize Social Security, end Medicare as we know it, massive cuts in Medicaid, wipe out the EPA, you don't have an Environmental Protection Agency anymore, Department of Energy gone, Department of Education gone. That is the agenda. And many people don't understand that the Koch Brothers have poured hundreds and hundreds of millions of dollars into the tea party and two other kinds of ancillary organizations to push this agenda." Later, during the shutdown, Sanders would return to the theme of financial influence, saying "Right now, as we speak, in the House of Representatives there are people who are being threatened that if they vote for a clean CR [continuing resolution to reopen the government] that huge sums of money will be spent against them in the next election."

The United States Chamber of Commerce, a business lobby group, called for the election of "people who understand the free market and not silliness".

By the end of the shutdown, public and behind-the-scenes disagreements over the strategy to defund the ACA led to reports of a "civil war" within the Republican Party. High-ranking party members were angry that colleagues forcing a shutdown had backed them into a corner and left them shouldering much of the blame. Minority Leader Mitch McConnell stated party leadership had come to the conclusion in July that defunding the ACA had no chance of succeeding, while Senator Kelly Ayotte started a "lynch mob" against Ted Cruz in a closed-door meeting with other Republican members, demanding that he and his backers stop attacking party members for not supporting the defunding effort. Many other Republicans publicly criticized Cruz, including John McCain, Lindsey Graham, and Bob Corker. Tea Party members responded: Cruz blamed the failure to get meaningful concessions from Democrats on moderate Senate Republicans for refusing to back their colleagues in the House, the Senate Conservatives Fund began sending out emails attacking McConnell for his role in ending the shutdown, and Sarah Palin suggested high-ranking moderate Republicans who voted in favor of the final bill would be targeted by Tea Party members in primary challenges. Representative Peter King suggested this in-fighting was aiding Democrats, and has led to questions over whether "friendly fire" could jeopardize Republican chances of winning the Senate and maintaining control over the House.

=== Financial markets ===
U.S. financial markets rose the next day as investors weighed the effects of the shutdown. In the UK, markets fell. On October 7, a week after the start of the shutdown, the Dow Jones Industrial Average fell below 15,000 to end at 14,936, but recovered at the week's end to finish at 15,237 on October 11.

=== Public opinion ===
==== Prior to the beginning of the shutdown ====
Prior to the shutdown, surveys of public opinion had shown that general sentiment among the American public about the Affordable Care Act was divided, with slightly more opposed to the act than in favor of it. For example, a Kaiser Family Foundation survey in September 2013 found that approximately 43% of Americans opposed the health care reform law while 39% viewed it favorably, numbers largely unchanged since 2011. Half of the public also said in September 2013, just days before major provisions of the law were scheduled to be implemented, that they did not have enough information about the law to know how it would affect their families; and 68% mistakenly believed or were unsure whether the law would establish a government-run health insurance plan (often referred to as a "public option") to compete with plans from private health insurance companies—which it would not.

Surveys conducted in September as congressional budget negotiations stalled showed that, despite the reservations many had about the Affordable Care Act, most Americans were opposed to the possibility of a shutdown, and most wanted the funding for the health care law to be handled separately from the negotiations over funding of general government operations. A CBS/New York Times poll found that 80% of Americans overall said threatening a government shutdown was not an acceptable way to negotiate. Several polls showed that most Americans opposed defunding the Affordable Care Act if demanding in the negotiations that the law be defunded would lead to a government shutdown (or to shutdown and default), including a poll conducted for the Republican members of Congress and a poll for the conservative advocacy group Crossroads GPS.

Tea Party Republicans were the only group that said funding for the health care law should be cut off even if it led to a shutdown. A Pew poll found that 71% of Tea Party Republicans said lawmakers who shared their views should stand by their principles and refuse to compromise in budget negotiations even if that would lead to a shutdown (compared to 18% of Democrats, 36% of independents, and 49% of Republicans overall). In a CNBC poll, 54% of Tea Party Republicans said they wanted the Affordable Care Act defunded even if it meant a government shutdown.

==== After shutdown had begun ====
Opinion surveys conducted after the shutdown began to show wide dissatisfaction with the performance of government leaders, especially with members of Congress. More Americans blamed congressional Republicans for the shutdown than blamed congressional Democrats or the President.

In a Fox News poll conducted during the first two days of the shutdown, 42% of registered voters blamed Republicans for the shutdown (17% blamed 'Republican leaders' and 25% blamed 'Tea Party Republicans such as Ted Cruz'); while 32% blamed Democrats (24% blamed 'President Obama' and 8% blamed 'Democratic leaders'). The rest, 20%, said all sides were to blame.

A Gallup poll conducted during the first week of the shutdown found that the percentage of Americans with a favorable opinion of the Republican Party had fallen to the lowest level for either party since Gallup began measuring party favorability in 1992, with only 28% of Americans saying they now had a favorable opinion of the Republican Party, down 10 points from September, before the shutdown. The Democratic Party had a 43% favorable rating, down 4 points from the previous month. President Obama's job approval was at 44%, about the same as when the shutdown began. The same poll found a near all-time low approval rating of Congress at only 11%, a drop from 19% in September. An NBC News/Wall Street Journal poll similarly found the public's support for the Republican Party at a historic low, with only 24% saying they viewed the party favorably. The public blamed the Republicans for the shutdown more than the President by 53% to 31%, a greater margin than had been the case during the last shutdown, in 1995–1996. An ABC News/Washington Post poll also conducted during the first week of the shutdown found that Americans disapproved of the government leaders' handling of the shutdown by wide margins: 70% disapproved of congressional Republicans' handling of budget negotiations, 61% disapproved of congressional Democrats', and 51% disapproved of President Obama's. (Disapproval of the Republicans' and Democrats' behavior in the budget talks had risen since the week before the shutdown began, but Obama's had remained the same.)

In addition, according to the NBC/Wall Street Journal poll, Republican efforts to defund or delay the Affordable Care Act through a government shutdown had caused an increase in popular approval of the law, from 31%, just before the shutdown, to 38%.

A CNN/ORC poll conducted October 18–20, after the end of the shutdown, found that nearly 8 out of 10 respondents said the shutdown was bad for the country, and that more than 7 out of 10 thought another shutdown was likely. CNN Polling Director Keating Holland said, "Six in 10 Americans now believe that the tea party movement is too extreme; only one in four consider it to be generally mainstream." 56% of survey participants said the Republican party was too extreme, up 8% from March; 42% said the Democratic party was too extreme, with no change from March. Half said Republicans were more responsible for the shutdown, compared to one-third who said the President was more to blame. 75% of those surveyed said most Republican members of Congress did not deserve re-election, while 54% said most Democratic members of Congress did not deserve re-election. Only 14% of respondents said they were satisfied with the way the country was being governed, down 11% since March, and worse than September 1973 during the Watergate scandal when 26% felt that way.

=== Tourism ===
The closure of the Statue of Liberty and Ellis Island caused frustration to many tourists, especially for those who were from outside of the United States. Signs near the entrance of the Statue of Liberty ferry posted on October 1 to inform tourists of the closure and provide information on another option of sightseeing tour by ferry. The ferry operator also had staff to turn away many would-be visitors who were disappointed and angry with the decision to close the monument. On October 11, Governor Andrew Cuomo announced that the state of New York had reached a deal with the federal government to open up the statue with New York state funding. The Statue of Liberty reopened on October 13.

Tourists at other overseas locations, such as the Normandy American Cemetery and Memorial in France, were also outraged by the closures. Many American tourists did not realize that such locations outside of the United States would be affected. Some expressed their frustration and embarrassment to the media.

=== Media pundits ===
Cover of the October 1, 2013, New York Daily News

Liberal commentators stated that Fox News featured criticism of Obama and minimization of the impact of the shutdown, referring to it as a "slimdown", while also acknowledging the political damage from the House Republican' shutdown strategy. Other pieces criticized the media coverage of the shutdown overall, ranging from accusations of false balance, hypocrisy in coverage, outsized claims of political impact, and on whom to blame at all.

Conservative Thomas Sowell said "Since we cannot read minds, we cannot say who — if anybody — 'wants to shut down the government.' But we do know who had the option to keep the government running and chose not to. The money voted by the House of Representatives covered everything that the government does, except for Obamacare."

Economist Paul Krugman wrote that the Republican House leadership were the party's "delusional wing," and that "reasonable people know that Mr. Obama can't and won't let himself be blackmailed in this way. After all, once he starts making concessions to people who threaten to blow up the world economy unless they get what they want, he might as well tear up the Constitution."

On October 7, 2013, columnist Jim Geraghty of National Review Online accused Senate majority leader Harry Reid of sadism for refusing to bring mini-continuing resolutions to the Senate floor for a vote, saying that "Harry Reid doesn't want to minimize the pain of the shutdown. He wants to maximize it." Before the shutdown, Harry Reid said "the American people will not be extorted by Tea Party anarchists."

=== International reactions ===
State

United Kingdom prime minister David Cameron stated the shutdown should serve as a reminder on how public expenditure should be prudently controlled, otherwise a deficit is inevitable. The statement came to reinforce the unpopular austerity measures and promote them as being necessary. He also indicated in an interview with BBC Radio 4, that the U.S. inability to finalize its spending plan will impose a huge risk on the global economy.

Media

Jonathan Kay of the National Post wrote, "America's gerrymandered primary system, which often provides a boost for the most radicalized candidates, explains much of the difference [with American politics]. In Canadian politics, comparing universal medicine to a Nazi plot gets you thrown out of the party. In the United States, it makes you the front-runner." David Blanchflower of The Independent wrote, "every country is in it together. Americans sneeze and Brits catch the flu." Anthony Zurcher of the BBC wrote, "For most of the world, a government shutdown is very bad news – the result of revolution, invasion or disaster. Even in the middle of its ongoing civil war, the Syrian government has continued to pay its bills and workers' wages." The News writes from Mexico that American leaders "are facing the unthinkable prospect of shutting down the government as they squabble over the inconsequential accomplishment of a 10-week funding extension. It isn't serious, but it certainly isn't funny."

An editorial in the state-run Xinhua News Agency, the official press agency of the People's Republic of China, said that the shutdown exposed again the "ugly side of partisan politics" and has "disappointed voters". It also called it a "bizarre" development and warned that the damage will multiply "if the drama drags on".

=== Debate over national park closures ===
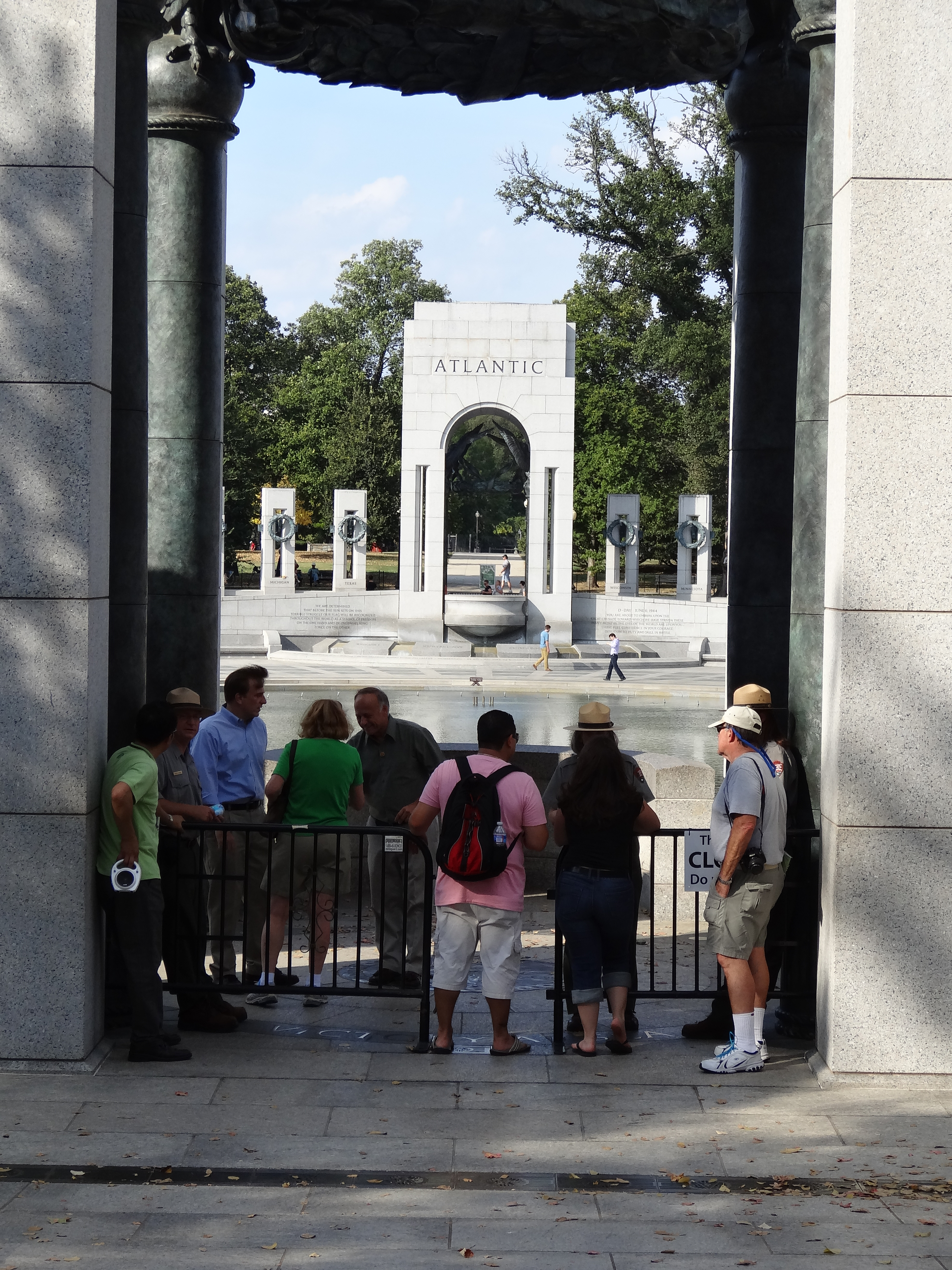
Some visitors were granted entry to the World War II Memorial on Sunday, October 6.

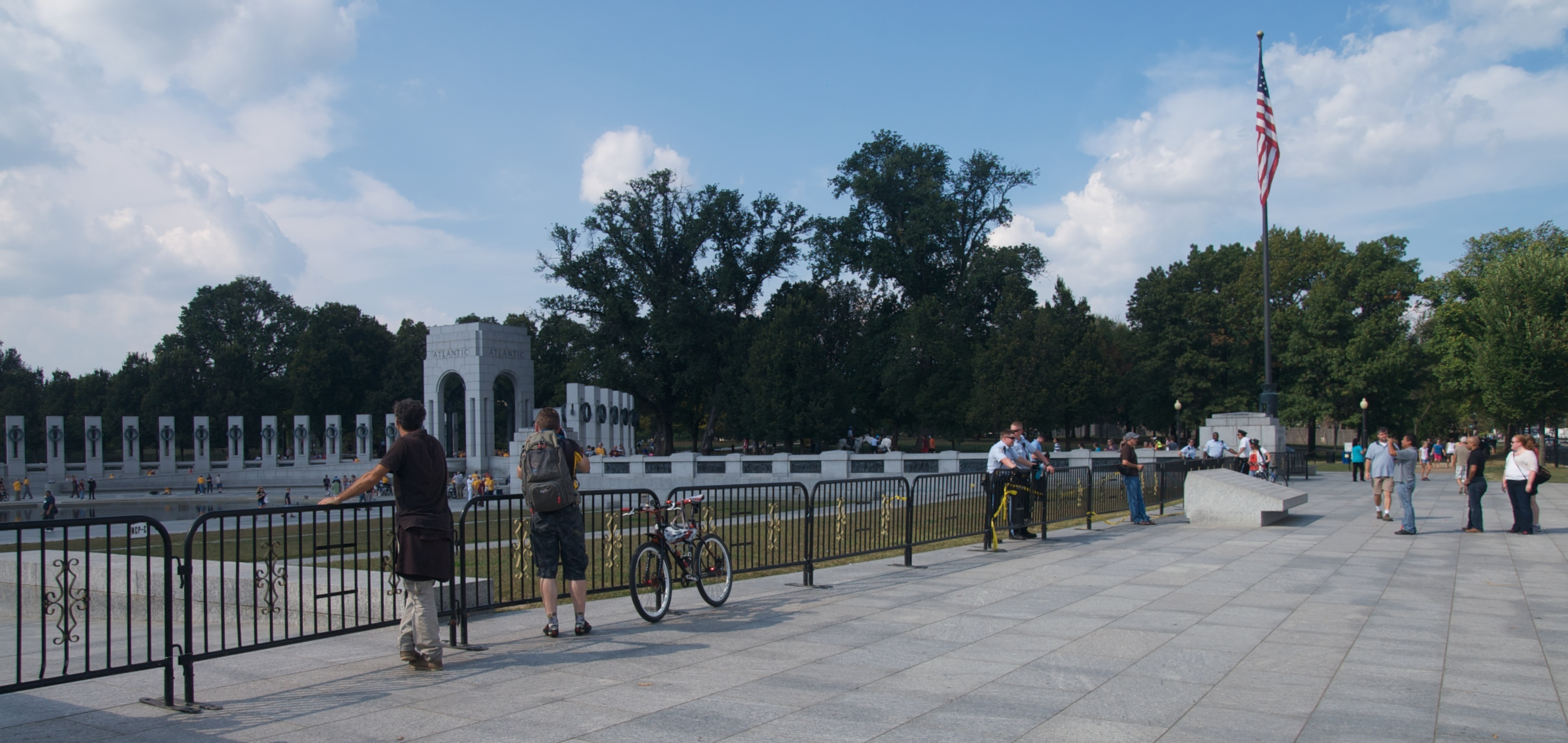
US Park Police guarded the barricaded World War II Memorial while allowing some groups to enter.

Related images...

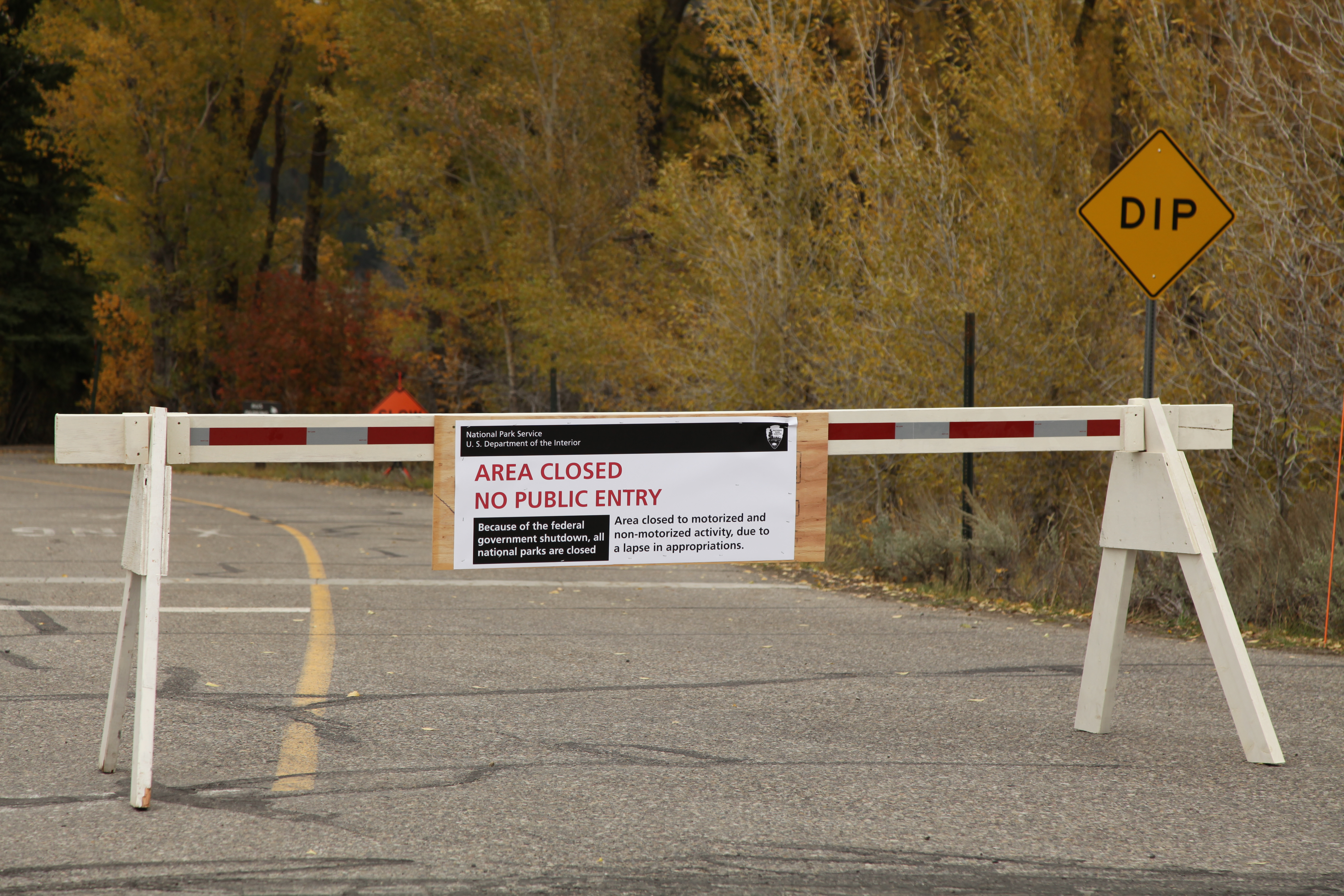
Grand Teton National Park shutdown

The Atlantic wrote that "National Park Service closures have become the most visible face of the shutdown." All 401 units of the National Park System were closed to the public during the shutdown, as Congress had not appropriated funding for their operations and maintenance. State and county parks, as well as beach parks and trails, remained open. Some conservative pundits, including RNC Chairman Reince Priebus and some Republican lawmakers, including Senator Ted Cruz, charged that some of the closures were unnecessary and overzealously enforced at the behest of the Obama administration. The National Park Service responded that it is legally mandated to protect national park lands and, in the absence of available staff to patrol, maintain and administer the areas, must close them to the public. The vast majority of the agency's staff were furloughed, leaving only a limited number of law enforcement rangers and firefighters on duty to protect life and property. A NPS press release said the shutdown of national parks would result in losses of $76 million a day in tourism-related sales among local communities. Richard Seamon, a law professor at the University of Idaho and former assistant solicitor general, told the Christian Science Monitor that the NPS risked vandalism, crime and legal liability if it left its properties open to the public during the shutdown. "If I were a lawyer for the Park Service, I'd advise it in no uncertain terms to close the parks to the public during the government shutdown, because it would be irresponsible to do otherwise. There are bound to be accidents or crimes that would have been avoided or ameliorated had officials been on duty to respond or patrol." Leaving the parks open, he said, "would be a veritable open season for criminals". A number of privately funded and privately operated enterprises, such as the Claude Moore Colonial Farm, were also required to close because they operate on or within National Park Service property that has been closed to the public. Various concession-operated visitor amenities were also closed because the NPS staff who oversee concessionaires have been furloughed, preventing the agency from managing and directing concession operations. Pisgah Inn, a private business on the Blue Ridge Parkway which operates under a concession agreement with the NPS, attempted to defy the closure order. On October 4, park rangers blocked the entrance to the inn and turned away visitors. Later the owner filed a legal complaint, and the Department of Interior allowed the lodge to reopen on October 9, 2013, in exchange for dropping the complaint.

On the first day of the shutdown, a large group of World War II veterans participating in an Honor Flight trip from Mississippi to the National World War II Memorial ignored the closure by the National Park Service and entered the memorial, alongside members of Congress of both political parties. The National Park Service declared that the gathering was protected by the First Amendment and rangers allowed the veterans to enter. The memorial is normally open to the public and patrolled by the U.S. Park Police 24 hours daily, and staffed by interpretive park rangers from 9:30 a.m. to 11:30 p.m.

While visiting the memorial on October 2, Congressman Randy Neugebauer publicly scolded a National Park Service ranger who was enforcing the agency's closure. As ordered by their superiors, the park rangers on duty at the memorial had been allowing World War II veterans into the site, but asking the general public to leave. A video recording taken by an NBC journalist showed Neugebauer angrily challenging the unidentified ranger, asking her, "How can you look at them ... and deny them access?" When she replied that it was "difficult", the congressman added that the "Park Service should be ashamed of themselves." The ranger responded, "I'm not ashamed," to which the congressman shot back: "well, you should be." Neugebauer's actions were widely criticized in major media. The Kansas City Star editorialized that Neugebauer was "full of misplaced moral outrage" and was wrong to attack the ranger publicly — "a public servant, handling a bad situation with much more professionalism than the self-important Neugebauer displayed", and a congressional ethics complaint was proposed by a congressional watch group. Neugebauer has said that his words were taken out of context. David McCumber, the Washington bureau chief of Hearst Newspapers, said Neugebauer had shown "staggering hypocrisy" in attacking a ranger for enforcing the closure the congressman had helped create.

At Acadia National Park, a hiker who was violating the closure order fell and injured her knee on October 5. All four rangers on duty were required to respond (along with a team of five search and rescue volunteers) in order to carry the hiker out of the park on a litter. Park ranger Ed Pontbriand said the situation illustrated the reason why closing the park to the public was necessary. "We're so short of staff, we can't handle major incidents in the park. That's why we're asking people to do the right thing and honor the closure," he said.

Some states petitioned the Department of Interior to use state funds to reopen operations of specific popular National Park Service areas in October for tourists. Utah governor Gary Herbert wired $1.67 million to the Department of Interior to reopen eight national parks in Utah for at least 10 days. Arizona agreed to reopen the Grand Canyon. New York reached a deal to reopen the Statue of Liberty. Colorado funded Rocky Mountain National Park operations. South Dakota wanted to partially re-open Mount Rushmore, but the National Park Service said only a full operation would be considered. On October 14, 2013, Mount Rushmore reopened on a day-by-day basis, with part of the $15,200 per day cost funded by donations. Congressmen introduced legislation to reimburse states willing to fund national park operations during the shutdown.

== See also ==
- 2008 financial crisis – Worldwide economic crisis
- 2018–2019 United States federal government shutdown
- Appropriations bill (United States) – Bill which allocates government spending
- Bipartisan Budget Act of 2013 – A proposed budget bill that would cover Fiscal Years 2014 and 2015, proposed by Paul Ryan and Patty Murray in December 2013
- Budget Control Act of 2011 – United States law
- Continuing Appropriations Resolution, 2014 – Bill that the Senate rejected which would have continued funding the government while defunding the Affordable Care Act
- Continuing resolution – Legislation for an interim operating budget pending approval of a full-year budget
- Euro area crisis – Multi-year debt crisis in multiple EU countries, 2009–2010
- Government shutdowns in the United States – Historical background and list of previous shutdowns
- History of United States debt ceiling
- Second-term curse – Purported curse regarding the second term of U.S. presidents
- United States Congress Joint Select Committee on Deficit Reduction
- United States debt-ceiling crisis of 2011
- United States debt-ceiling crisis of 2013
- United States federal government credit-rating downgrade of 2011
- United States federal government credit-rating downgrade of 2013
