= List of agencies affected by the 2013 United States federal government shutdown =

The following is a list of government agencies and operations affected by the 2013 United States federal government shutdown.

== American Battle Monuments Commission ==
The American Battle Monuments Commission operates 24 cemeteries on foreign soil for American servicemen killed overseas. These cemeteries, as well as 26 monuments to American servicemen, were closed through the shutdown.

== Congress ==
Although members of Congress were guaranteed to get paid during the shutdown, they have wide latitude in deciding which employees to keep on the job and which, if any, to furlough. Many members elected to keep their entire staff on payroll "in order to continue serving...constituents". Other members furloughed half or most of their staffs, possibly on a rotating basis, or closed their local office while keeping their Washington office open and at least partially staffed.

The House members' gym was directed to remain operational while the gym for Congressional staff closed as planned. Dozens of House members live in their government offices to save personal expenses and use the House gym to shower.

== Consumer Product Safety Commission ==
The Consumer Product Safety Commission did not investigate or recall products that might cause injuries but do not pose an imminent danger to safety. CPSC furloughed port inspectors who test to make sure that imported products meet safety standards, for instance verifying that children's toys do not contain excessive amounts of lead or that sleepwear meets flammability standards. The Commission furloughed all but 23 of its 540 employees.

== Department of Agriculture ==
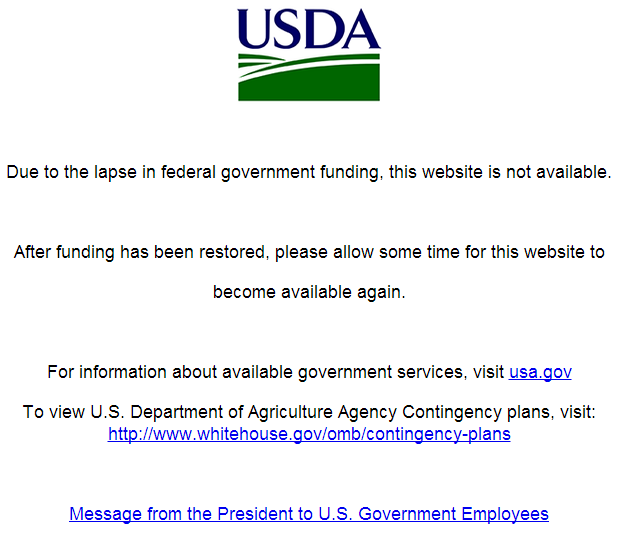
USDA website shutdown on 1 October 2013

Meat, poultry, and grain inspectors continued working. However, the U.S. Department of Agriculture did not issue any statistical or economic reports, including those on the prices and supply levels of agricultural goods. These reports are especially important to commodities markets. U.S. National Forests remain open, and responsible dispersed camping was allowed; campgrounds and other recreational sites, however, were closed. The Agricultural Research Service and the Foreign Agricultural Service will shut down.

The Special Supplemental Nutrition Program for Women, Infants and Children, or WIC, were greatly curtailed. The government didn't contribute any new money into the program, which gives food for low-income pregnant women, mothers, and young children. Some states were able to keep running the program with current money for about a week. The larger Supplemental Nutrition Assistance Program, also called food stamps or EBT cards, is funded by the Recovery Act and lasts through 2014.

The Forest Service closed its offices and furloughed the vast majority of its staff, with only some law enforcement and firefighting staff staying on duty. As a result of the furloughs, timber companies were ordered to stop logging operations in the 155 National Forests within seven days. Initially, the agency was able to keep a number of campgrounds and recreation areas open, but as the shutdown extended into its second week, many of those sites were closed as well. Forest Service spokesman Leo Kay said the closures of concession-operated campgrounds were necessary because the staff who manage and oversee concession contracts have been furloughed. Regarding the closure of the Maroon Bells Recreation Area, Scott Fitzwilliams, forest supervisor of the White River National Forest in Colorado, said “We have no funding to pay rangers to manage the site or collect fees, no funding to pump toilets, test water supplies and extremely limited law enforcement capabilities. If we allowed vehicles to access the area, where would the people go to the bathroom? Where would they put their garbage?”

The National Organic Program, which confirms that food labeled as organic actually meets organic standards, was suspended as was a program that confirms that imported foods are correctly labeled with their country of origin.

The USDA stopped issuing mortgages to families in rural areas, causing delays for some people who were in the process of purchasing a new home. USDA's Rural Housing Service handles about 132,000 mortgages a year, or about 1.4% of all mortgages in the United States. Families can qualify for a USDA mortgage if they make up to 115% of the median income in their area.

== Department of Commerce ==
The Commerce Department furloughed 40,234 of its 46,420 employees. The United States Patent and Trademark Office planned to stay open for three to four weeks using funds from the fees it collects. The National Weather Service provided weather forecasts, watches, and warnings normally, as critical to protecting lives and property. Some activities related to weather research and developing improvements to the Global Forecast System ceased. The Commerce Department did not release data on the state of the economy.

== Department of Defense ==
Deputy Defense Secretary Ashton B. Carter issued a memo detailing which employees would be furloughed.

On September 28, 2013, Rep. Mike Coffman of Colorado introduced the Pay Our Military Act. The bill would "appropriate funds to pay the military at any time in FY 2014 when appropriations are not in effect", a situation which would include any potential shutdown. It passed both the House and Senate, and the President signed it into law, recording a video message for members of the military.

Food prices for many military personnel, their families, and retirees were expected to rise due to the closure of the Defense Commissary Agency. This agency runs 178 commissaries, or grocery stores, in the US which offer food at about a 30% discount for military families. The 68 commissaries overseas stayed open.

Furloughs of Defense Department civilian employees grounded Air Force fighter squadrons. Air Combat Command grounded squadrons based in the US that aren't set to deploy abroad until after January. This includes the 366th Fighter Wing based out of Mountain Home Air Force Base in Idaho. The Pentagon has also furloughed civilian specialists who help craft military policy towards the Middle East.

As of October 6, the Pay Our Military Act was interpreted by lawyers from the Defense and Justice Departments to allow nearly all civilian Defense personnel to return to work, on the basis that they "contribute to the morale, well-being, capabilities and readiness of service members." Death benefits for the families of soldiers killed in action during the shutdown were provided by funds from a private foundation, which would then be repaid by the Defense Department after appropriations are enacted.

=== Military Academies ===
The United States service academies were affected by the shutdown in various ways. Civilian faculty members were furloughed, and many classes were canceled. The library at the United States Air Force Academy was closed. The libraries at the United States Naval Academy and the United States Military Academy remained open, but students could not check out books. The library at the United States Military Academy was staffed by the musicians of the West Point Band. Intercollegiate athletics were suspended.

== Department of Education ==
The U.S. Department of Education furloughed 3,983 of its 4,225 employees. The government continued to disburse Pell Grants and other student loans, but the furloughs may have caused delays and limit the department's ability to respond to questions. In its contingency plan for a shutdown, the Department of Education warned that a "protracted delay in Department obligations and payments beyond one week would severely curtail the cash flow to school districts, colleges and universities, and vocational rehabilitation agencies that depend on the Department's funds to support their services".

The Department of Education's Office of Civil Rights suspended investigations into whether certain colleges and universities mishandled their response to sexual assault on campus as well as investigations into whether colleges failed to report crimes as required by the Clery Act.

== Department of Energy ==
The U.S. Department of Energy furloughed 9,584 of its 13,814 employees. Those working continued to work and were intended to be paid until reserve funds exhausted.

== Department of Health and Human Services ==
A reported 52% of Health and Human Services employees were furloughed.

The Head Start Program, which provides preschool and other services to young children nationwide, did not provide grant money to 23 programs in 11 states. These programs were scheduled to receive funding on October 1. Among the Head Start programs that temporarily closed was one serving 900 children in Prentiss, Mississippi.

Sub-agencies of the Department of Health and Human Services were also affected:

=== Centers for Disease Control and Prevention ===
The Centers for Disease Control and Prevention was not able to conduct "in-depth investigations to identify and link outbreaks that may be occurring simultaneously in multiple states" or provide flu surveillance due to the furloughing of 68% of its employees.

=== Food and Drug Administration ===
Approximately 45% of the Food and Drug Administration's 14,779 employees were furloughed. The FDA stopped routine food safety inspections as well as most of its laboratory research. Employees still handled emergencies, high-risk product recalls and product review activities funded by user fees paid before the shutdown began. The FDA posted on its website a detailed list of "Medical Product Activities During the Federal Government Shutdown". The agency retained approximately 587 employees to inspect products and review imports, and additional staff of 120 to handle emergencies and high-risk recalls. These programs were to continue in some capacity because they are deemed “related to the safety of human life.”

=== National Institutes of Health ===
The National Institutes of Health ceased research conducted at its headquarters in Bethesda, Maryland and did not enroll new patients in medical trials. NIH recently completed one round of grantmaking to outside researchers and applications for the next round were due on October 5. If the shutdown was not prolonged, approval of new grants were not to be disrupted. In rare cases, medical researchers who received grants from NIH may have difficulty accessing funds. The related National Institute of Environmental Health Science ceased research conducted at its headquarters in Research Triangle Park, North Carolina. On the NIH official website, a warning was posted as a banner headline on all of its pages that read, "Due to the lapse in government funding, the information on this web site may not be up to date, transactions submitted via the web site may not be processed, and the agency may not be able to respond to inquiries until appropriations are enacted."

== Department of Homeland Security ==
About 86% of the Department of Homeland Security's 231,000 employees continued to work during the shutdown. As a fee-based agency, U.S. Citizenship and Immigration Services continued to process applications and petitions for immigration during time of the shutdown, including petitions for immigrant and nonimmigrant workers as well as applications for adjustment of status. Some processing delays may have occurred because certain staff were furloughed.

Airport screeners at the (Transportation Security Administration) will also be affected. 92% of the United States Secret Service, 88% of the United States Coast Guard, 88% of Customs and Border Protection and 78% of the Federal Emergency Management Agency continued working. 97% of the United States Citizenship and Immigration Services stayed on the job.

The Department of Homeland Security shut down the E-Verify system, which enables employers to check whether the people they hire are eligible to work in the United States. A number of states require employers to use E-Verify for all new employees. Georgia requires all companies with more than 10 employees to use the system.

The Department of Homeland Security did not accept or investigate civil liberties complaints and did not provide civil liberties training to state, local and federal officials. The Coast Guard did not issue licenses for commercial or recreational boats or their crews. The Federal Law Enforcement Training Center in Glynco, Georgia is closed. The center provides training for about 70,000 state, local, federal and international law enforcement officers every year.

== Department of Housing and Urban Development ==
The Federal Housing Administration continued to process applications for new home loans. The agency furloughed more than 96% of its staff, resulting in delays.

== Department of the Interior ==
Closed monuments and memorials in Washington, DC

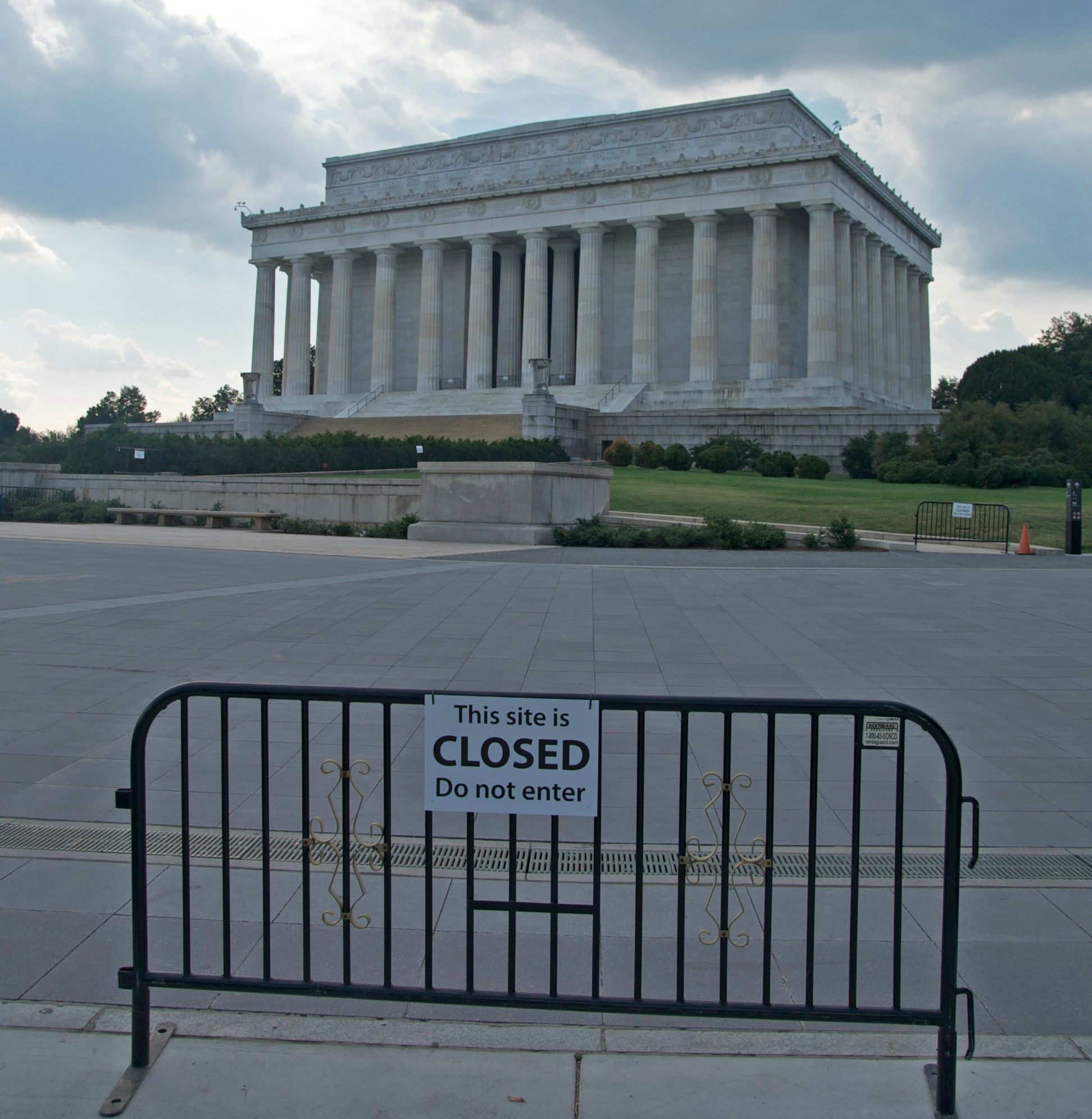
Lincoln Memorial

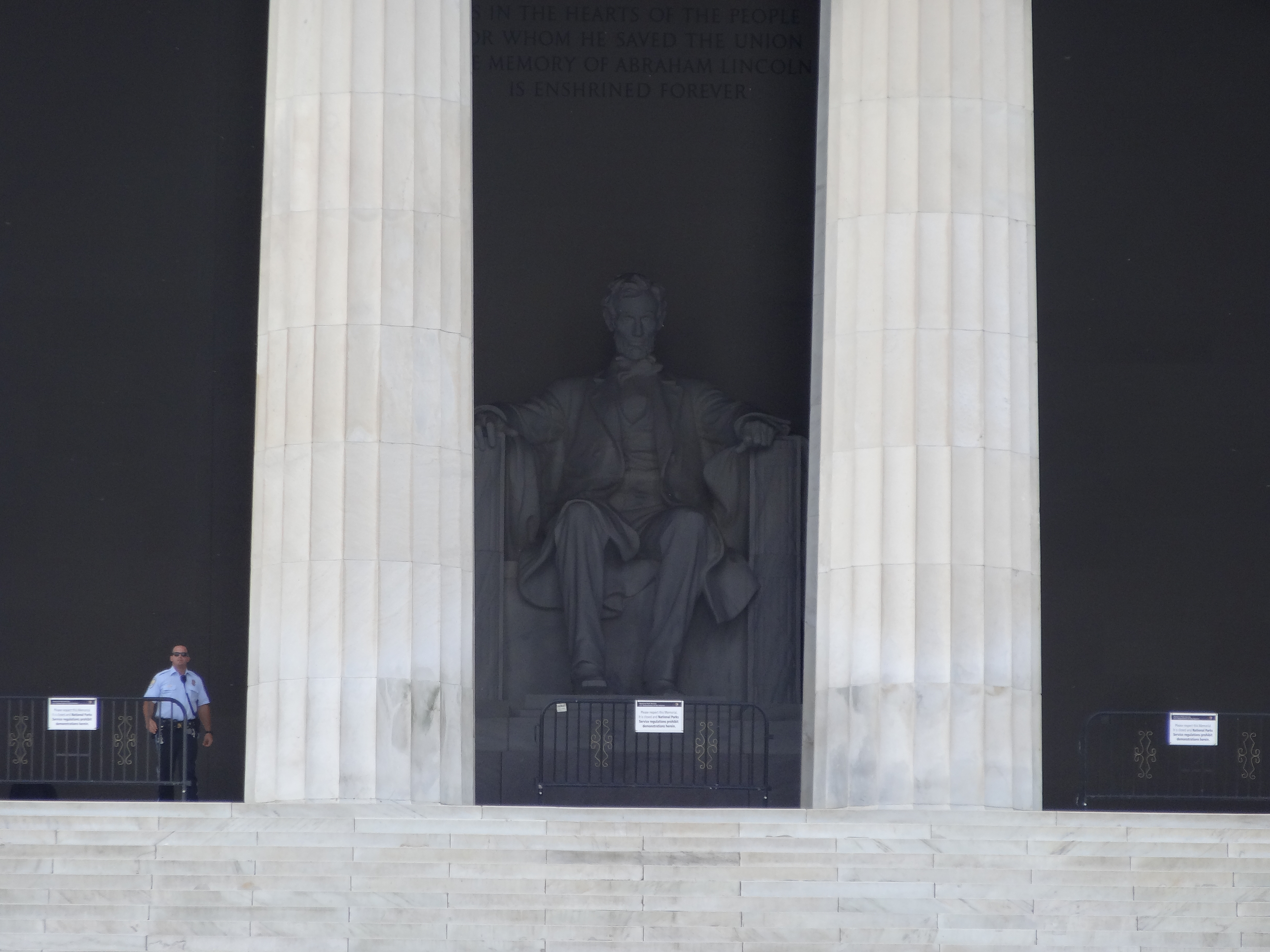
Abraham Lincoln statue

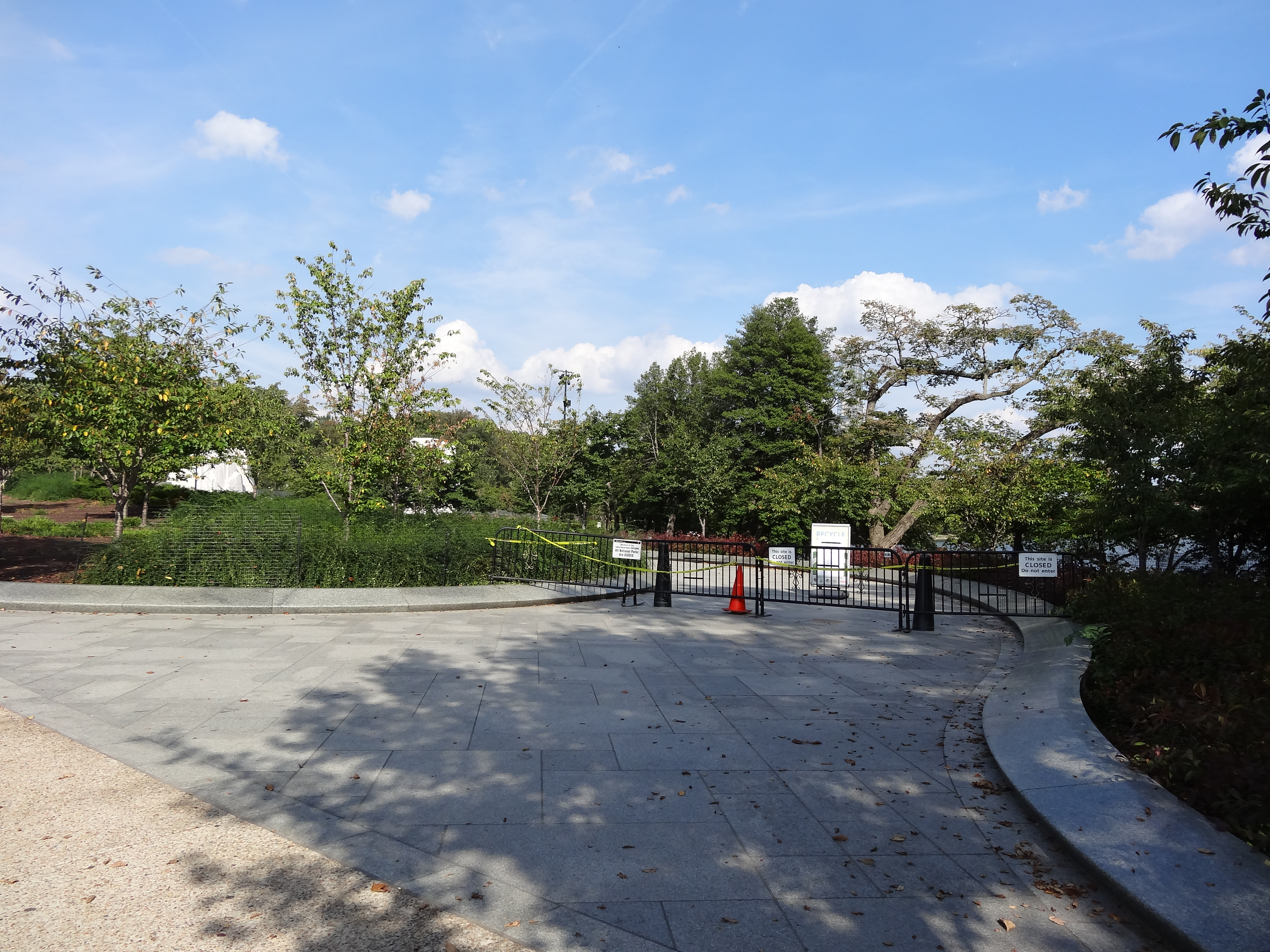
Martin Luther King, Jr. Memorial

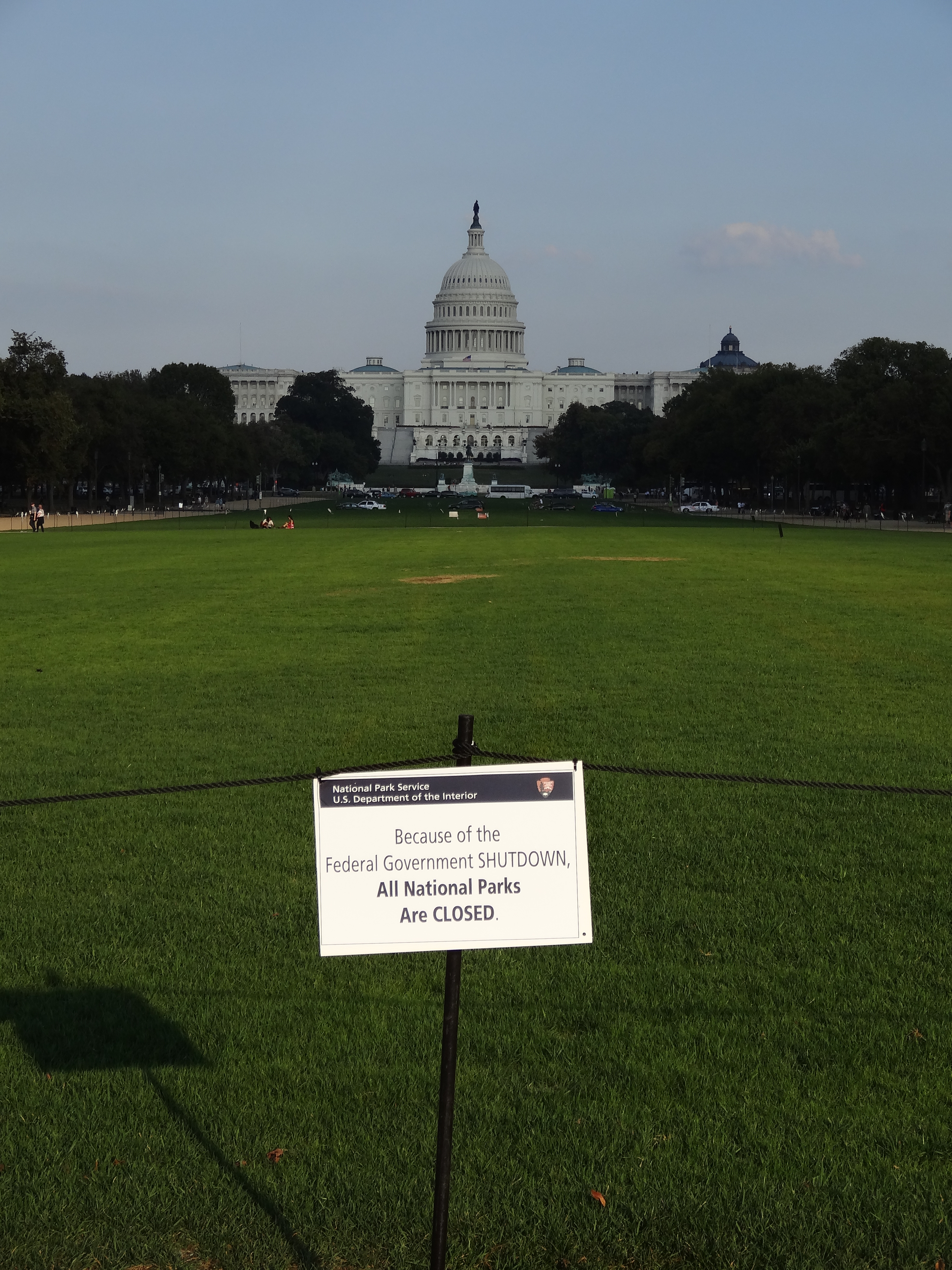
National Mall

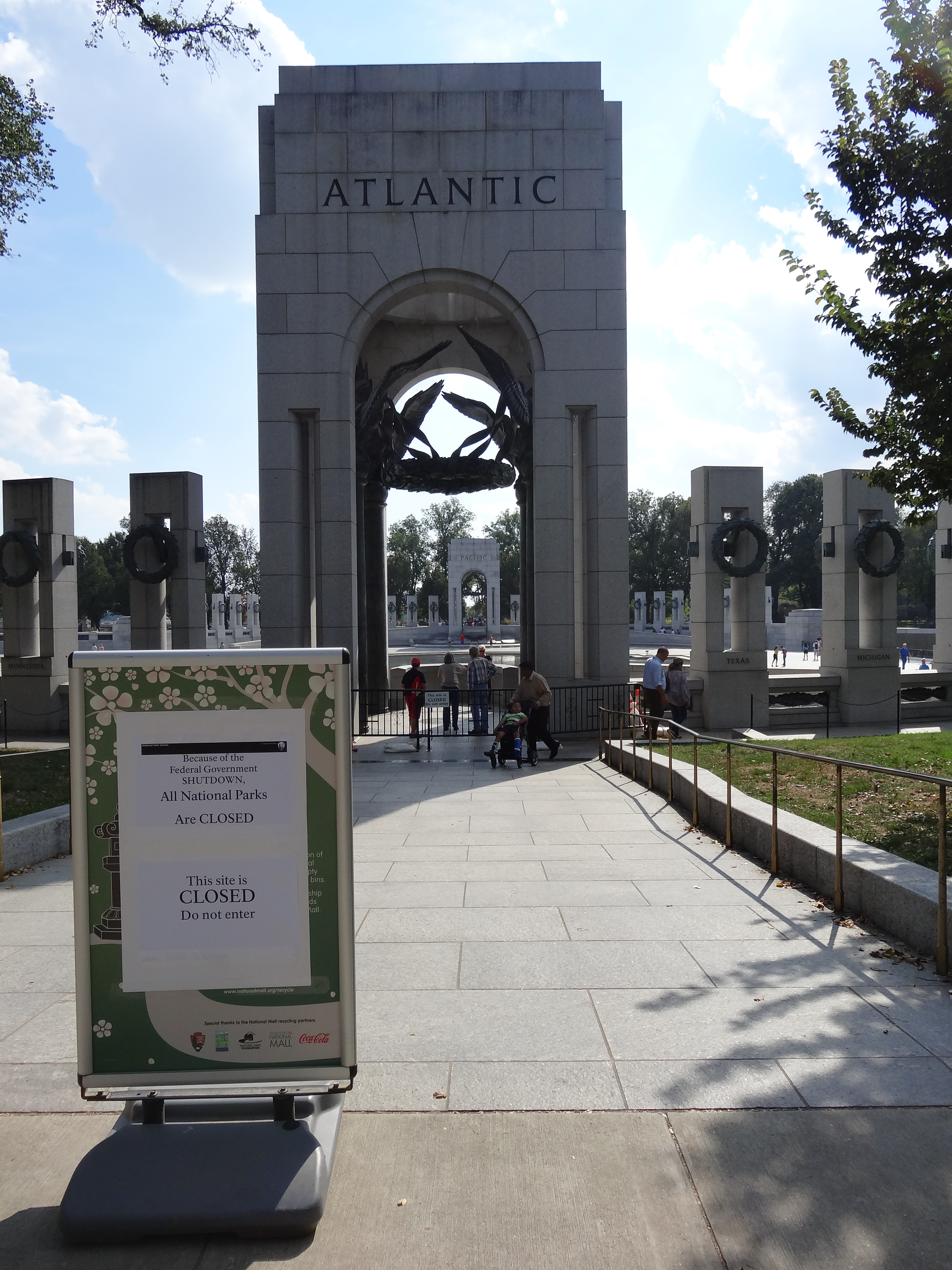
World War II Memorial

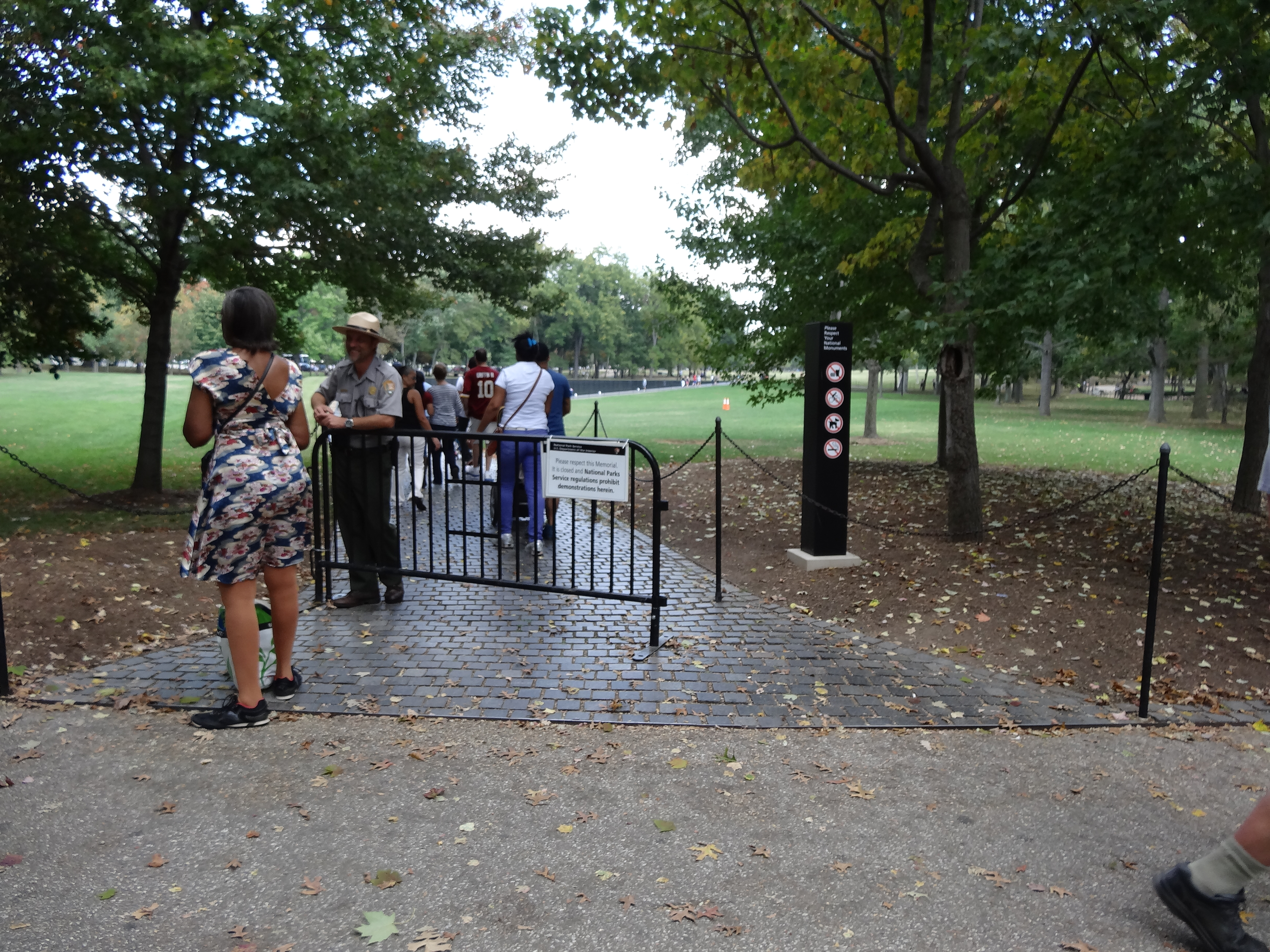
Vietnam Veterans Memorial

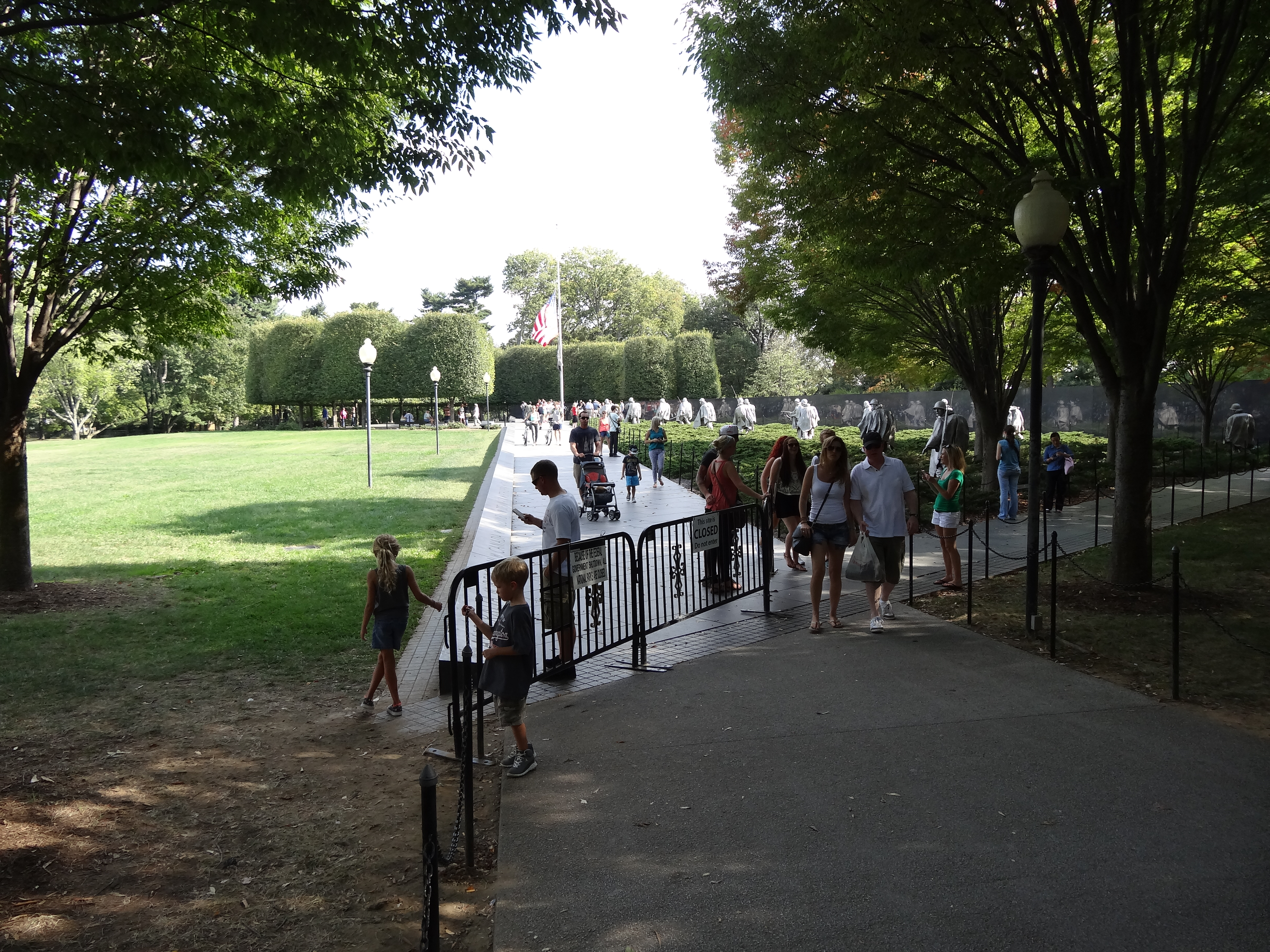
Korean War Veterans Memorial

All 401 units of the National Park Service were closed, with only a limited number of law enforcement rangers and firefighters remaining on duty. On Oct 11, a small number of units, including Zion, Rocky Mountain and Capitol Reef national parks, were reopened temporarily, as some state governments agreed to provide bridge funding for a limited time to enable the parks to open. The United States Park Police will erect barriers around National Monuments in Washington D.C. and across the country. The list of closed sites included Yosemite National Park, the National Mall, the Statue of Liberty, Ellis Island, Philadelphia's Independence Hall and City Tavern, Alcatraz, and numerous monuments in Washington D.C. including the Washington Monument and the World War II Memorial. The National Park Service gave visitors who staying overnight in a National Park 48 hours to leave. Furthermore, its Flickr page became inactive.

The Bureau of Land Management will stopped processing new permits for oil and gas exploration but monitored and inspected existing production sites and pipelines. The Bureau of Ocean Energy Management stopped nearly all work on new offshore energy production.

The shutdown hampered efforts to find a hiker reported missing at Craters of the Moon National Monument and Preserve since September 23. The body of the hiker's companion was found previously. The search had been ongoing, but with the start of the shutdown, 16 park staffers were furloughed, hampering the response. The hiker's family had taken to asking for volunteers to continue the search.

A four-day commemoration of the centennial of Cabrillo National Monument in San Diego, California had been planned for October 11–14, but it was cancelled due to the partial shutdown of United States government functions. The park rescheduled the centennial event to coincide with the annual "Fort Rosecrans Goes to War," a tribute to San Diego and World War II, on December 7–8, 2013.

== Department of Justice ==
85% of Justice Department employees will stay on the job. Law enforcement officers stayed on the job, but work on civil litigation stopped. The Justice Department filed a motion requesting to delay the antitrust trial over the American Airlines–US Airways merger. The Justice Department is also sought to delay a lawsuit brought by the Electronic Frontier Foundation seeking information about government surveillance and a lawsuit brought by the American Civil Liberties Union seeking information on the use of armed drones.

The nation's immigration courts furloughed about 70% of their employees, including judges. The only cases to be heard involved individuals who were already detained. Since the courts were severely backlogged before the shutdown, those whose hearings were delayed might have to wait a year or more for another opportunity.

== Department of Labor ==
The Occupational Safety and Health Administration stopped all workplace safety inspections that did not involve immediate danger or death. Investigations into wage theft and employment discrimination stopped. The Labor Department continued to pay unemployment insurance and workers' compensation claims.

The Mine Safety and Health Administration furloughed about 1,400 of 2,355 employees. MSHA stopped conducting routine safety inspections of mines but continued inspections of mines that are considered particularly hazardous.

The Bureau of Labor Statistics stopped conducting research on employment and the economy. The Bureau stopped work on the monthly report on employment. This report, which was scheduled for release on October 4, is widely used by financial markets to assess the state of the US economy. The Labor Department's weekly report on jobless claims will not be affected.

Of the Labor Department's 16,304 employees, 82% were furloughed, while 2,954 stayed on the job.

== Department of State ==
The U.S. Department of State continued to process visa and passport applications, using funds from fees, and consular services also continued. The department's Office of the Inspector General shut down. The State Department instituted a hiring freeze and delayed the start dates of applicants who received job offers.

== Department of Transportation ==
The National Highway Traffic Safety Administration would not issue any new automotive recalls. Consumers were able to file car safety complaints but these complaints would not be acted on. The agency suspended field investigations of automotive crashes. NHTSA did not send personnel to investigate a battery fire that destroyed a Tesla Model S electric car in Kent, Washington. The agency furloughed 333 of its 597 employees.

The United States Merchant Marine Academy suspended classes. The United States Maritime Administration, which runs the academy, furloughed 451 of its 830 employees.

The Federal Aviation Administration furloughed 15,500 of its 46,000 employees. Air traffic controllers will continue to work, but about 3,000 airline safety inspectors were furloughed and 800 of them were recalled again. Work on the Next Generation Air Transportation System ceased, and also training for air traffic controllers and aviation policymaking.

== Department of the Treasury ==
The shutdown undermined efforts by the United States to prevent money laundering and to enforce economic sanctions on Iran, North Korea and other countries. The Treasury Department furloughed 90% of the staff of the Office of Terrorism and Financial Intelligence and 91% of the Financial Crimes Enforcement Network. These agencies handle reports of suspicious activity from banks and financial institutions and implement sanctions.

The shutdown delayed the release of new alcoholic beverages. The Alcohol and Tobacco Tax and Trade Bureau would not approve labels for alcoholic products and nor approve permits for distilleries, wineries, and breweries. The shutdown delayed the signing of a treaty with France about the implementation of the Foreign Account Tax Compliance Act.

=== Internal Revenue Service ===
The Internal Revenue Service did not provide assistance to taxpayers during the shutdown. Tax refunds were delayed, but taxpayers with an extension of their 2012 income tax return were required to submit the return by October 15. The IRS suspended audits of taxpayers during the shutdown; however, IRS criminal investigations continued at nearly normal levels. About 90% of IRS employees were furloughed.

The IRS stopped issuing forms that are used to verify the income of mortgage applicants. These forms are often required by banks in order to close a mortgage. Because the forms typically are requested weeks before closing, the mortgage market experienced a limited impact, though it was predicted that a shutdown that lasted beyond one or two weeks would cause a disruption.

== Department of Veterans Affairs ==
Medical services provided by the Department of Veterans Affairs were unaffected by the shutdown. Veterans had already received pension, disability, and GI Bill payments for October. The VA predicted that if the shutdown lasted for more than two or three weeks, the VA might not be able to pay benefits for November. The VA continued to work on disability claims that were filed before the shutdown, but veterans with delays. New disability claims were not processed during the shutdown and all appeals of disability claims were suspended. The VA furloughed 14,224 of its 332,025 employees.

== Environmental Protection Agency ==
The Environmental Protection Agency furloughed over 93% of its 16,205 employees. The Agency planned to nearly entirely cease issuing licenses and permits, which likely caused delays for companies seeking to build or expand facilities. The agency stopped working on new policies in areas such as air pollution and renewable fuels.

The EPA suspended cleanup work at 505 Superfund sites, which are areas contaminated by hazardous chemicals.

== Federal Communications Commission ==
The Federal Communications Commission furloughed about 98% of its 1,754 employees. The FCC stopped work on its approvals of mergers in the telecommunications and broadcast television industries. The list of deals that were subject to delays included Verizon Communications' $130 billion purchase of Vodafone's stake in Verizon Wireless, AT&T's $1.2 billion purchase of Leap Wireless, Gannett Company's $1.5 billion purchase of Belo, Tribune Company's $2.7 billion purchase of Local TV and Sinclair Broadcast Group's $985 million purchase of Allbritton Communications Company.

The shutdown led the FCC to delay the January 2014 wireless spectrum auction by a week. Permits for radio masts and towers and license processing for radio stations were delayed and the FCC did not respond to consumer complaints.

The FCC suspended work on the testing and approval of new wireless products, such as cell phones. A prolonged government shutdown might have delayed the release of new products.

== Federally funded research and development centers ==
Federally Funded Research and Development Centers (FFRDCs) were affected in the shutdown. The Aerospace Corporation, which is the FFRDC for national security space, was directed to issue a stop work order to all but mission-critical tasks by United States Air Force Space and Missile Systems Center, effectively furloughing 2,000 of its 3,500 employees.

== General Services Administration ==
The General Services Administration furloughed a large part of its 11,821-employee staff while maintaining an active workforce of about 4,094 to continue maintenance of federal property and to continue ongoing construction projects through the Public Buildings Service. Employees of the Federal Acquisition Service not immediately furloughed were subject to a phased shutdown that would take 25 business days.

== Intelligence agencies ==
Intelligence agencies continued to operate but 70% of the civilian workforce was furloughed. Reuters reported that the Central Intelligence Agency furloughed approximately 12,500 employees. There was less of an impact at the Defense Intelligence Agency and the National Security Agency, as a large percentage of the workforce of these agencies are uniformed members of the military. NSA Director Keith B. Alexander said that the agency had furloughed "over 960 Ph.D.s, over 4,000 computer scientists, [and] over a thousand mathematicians." A spokesman for the Director of National Intelligence said: "The Intelligence Community's ability to identify threats and provide information for a broad set of national security decisions will be diminished for the duration. The immediate and significant reduction in employees on the job means that we will assume greater risk and our ability to support emerging intelligence requirements will be curtailed. The fraction of Intelligence Community employees who remain on the job will be stretched to the limit and forced to focus only on the most critical security needs." It was predicted that If the shutdown lasted for more than a few weeks intelligence operations would also be affected by delays in awarding new contracts or paying existing contractors.

The Privacy and Civil Liberties Oversight Board postponed hearings on NSA surveillance that were scheduled for October 4.

== Library of Congress ==
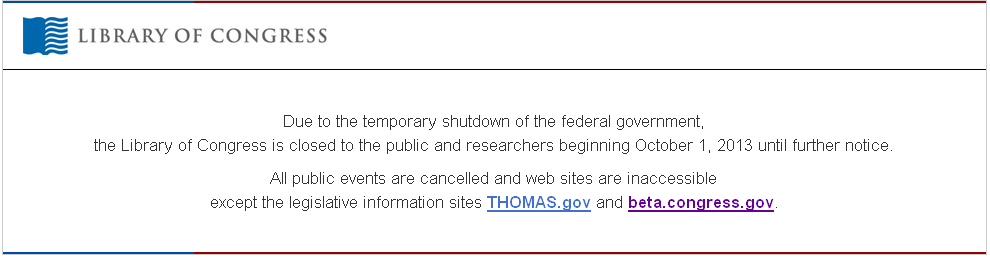
Shutdown message at LoC website on October 1

The Library of Congress shut down. The National Library Service for the Blind and Physically Handicapped ceased operations and all Library of Congress websites except for two sources of legislative information, THOMAS and congress.gov, were inaccessible. On October 3, 2013, access to all loc.gov websites was restored.

== National Aeronautics and Space Administration ==
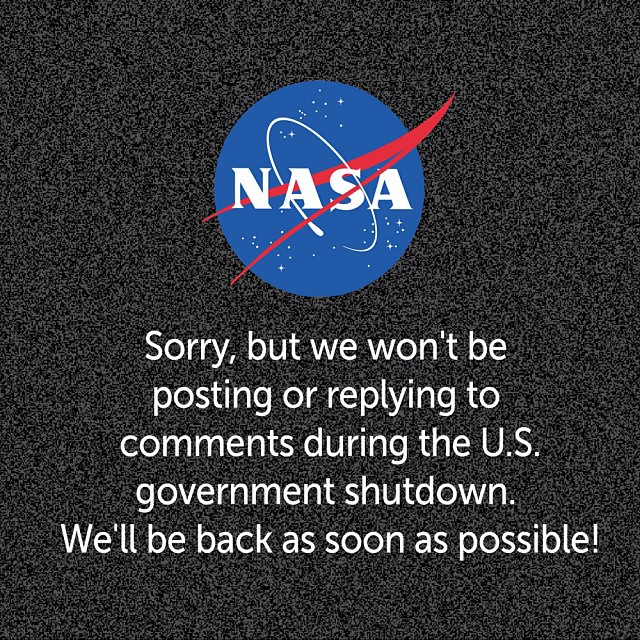
Image posted on NASA Goddard Space Flight Center Flickr account to inform the public that online activities of NASA are suspended during the shutdown

NASA furloughed 97% of its staff, leaving fewer than 600 out of more than 18,000 employees on the job. NASA continued to support the astronauts on the International Space Station and the agency maintained previously launched spacecraft. Work with unmanned spacecraft was minimal. The Hubble Space Telescope, Curiosity and Opportunity Mars rovers continued to operate, but analysis of the data they collected ceased. Work on any spacecraft that not yet launched stopped. The NASA.gov website, NASA TV, the organization's cable and IPTV network, was replaced by messages referring to the shutdown. NASA's LADEE mission was in the critical phase of entering the Moon's orbit and so some crew members worked on maintaining the spacecraft. No experiments were conducted.

An extended shutdown initially threatened to force a 26-month postponement of NASA's MAVEN mission to Mars. The spacecraft was scheduled to launch on November 18. If it did not launch by December 7, Mars would have moved too far out of alignment with the Earth. The next launch window occurred in 2016. Bruce Jakosky, who was to direct the mission, said that a 2016 launch would be less useful scientifically because the timing would correspond with a low point in the solar cycle. On October 3, Jakosky reported that NASA had deemed a 2013 MAVEN launch essential to ensuring future communication with current NASA assets on Mars—namely the Opportunity and Curiosity rovers—and that spacecraft processing had already been restarted in preparation for an on-time launch.

== National Archives ==
The National Archives and Records Administration (NARA) will down all its archival facilities and the NARA-operated parts of Presidential Libraries. The NARA Federal Records Centers remained open. Most NARA employees were furloughed.

== National Labor Relations Board ==
The shutdown of the National Labor Relations Board, which furloughed all but 11 of its 1,600 employees, led to delays in the process that handles disputes between labor and management. In New York City, a trial involving Cablevision and its employees was delayed. The agency also oversees elections where workers vote on whether or not to unionize. These elections were delayed for the duration of the shutdown. In one case, adjunct professors at Bentley University in Massachusetts held a vote over whether to unionize, but the votes were not to be counted until after the shutdown ends.

== National Science Foundation ==
The National Science Foundation made no payments to scientists during the shutdown. The NSF did not accept reports from grantees and did not respond to inquiries.

The National Radio Astronomy Observatory, which is funded by the NSF, shut down three radio telescopes: the Green Bank Telescope in West Virginia, the Very Large Array in New Mexico and the Very Long Baseline Array which stretches from Hawaii to the US Virgin Islands. These telescopes are used by thousands of astronomers. One radio astronomer told the journal Science that a shutdown could render useless a yearlong project to trace the shape of the Milky Way which had already cost $500,000. Three-Hundred eighty-five NRAO employees were furloughed.

The United States Antarctic Program announced that it changed its three research stations to "caretaker" status, meaning that "[a]ll field and research activities not essential to human safety and preservation of property will be suspended". Most work at Antarctica is done between the months of October and February, when the region experiences summer. Because of the logistical difficulties involved in working in Antarctica, the shutdown may result in the cancellation of all American research in Antarctica for the entire 2013–2014 season. Scientists at McMurdo Station, Amundsen-Scott South Pole Station, and Palmer Station study topics such as biology, astrophysics and climate change.

== National Transportation Safety Board ==
The shutdown has reduced the ability of the National Transportation Safety Board to investigate aviation accidents. After the fatal crash of a Cessna Citation in Santa Monica, California, investigators collected perishable evidence from the scene but were then sent home.

== Nuclear Regulatory Commission ==
The Nuclear Regulatory Commission, which oversees nuclear power in the United States, announced that it would furlough 3,600 of its 3,900 employees on October 10. About 300 personnel, including safety inspectors and a small emergency response unit continued working. Operations halted include routine inspections involving nuclear materials and waste, emergency preparedness exercises, licensing of nuclear plants, and rulemaking. The NRC was able to delay furloughs by using leftover money from the previous year, but this funding ran out.

== Office of Special Counsel ==
The Office of Special Counsel stopped investigating cases of government wrongdoing. Of the pending investigations that stopped, 37 involve health and safety, including 19 that involve complaints of improper medical care at Veterans Administration hospitals. Investigations of overtime abuse also stalled. Whistleblowers could not report wrongdoing during the shutdown. The agency furloughed 107 of its 110 staff.

== Small Business Administration ==
The Small Business Administration will stop processing new loans to small businesses with the exception of loans to businesses affected by natural disasters. Existing loans will be unaffected. Programs that help mentor business owners, including businesses owned by veterans, will be shut down. About 62% of SBA employees will be furloughed.

== Smithsonian Institution ==
The Smithsonian Institution shut down. Among the attractions closed were the National Museum of Natural History, the National Air and Space Museum, and the National Zoological Park. Skeleton crews were on site to provide security and to feed and care for the animals.

== Social Security Administration ==
The Social Security field offices offered limited services, including hearings offices before an Administrative Law Judge (ALJ), though the card centers were closed. Beneficiaries of payment would continue to receive their dues. Online services continued.

== The White House ==
The Executive Office of the President furloughed 1,265 employees out of a total of 1,701. Within that total, the White House Office retained 129 staff members as exempt under the Antideficiency Act. (The other 117 are exempt under the Annual and Sick Leave Act.)

== Other ==
The United States Holocaust Memorial Museum shut down as well as the United States Institute of Peace, a government think-tank. Another research institute, the Woodrow Wilson International Center for Scholars, continued operating with reduced staffing. Some parts of the Broadcasting Board of Governors shut down due to a lapse in appropriations for the U.S. federal government, but BBG-supported media still delivered news and information programs to audiences around the world. U.S. international media activities under the BBG that are deemed “foreign relations essential to national security,” such as news programming and distribution, are excepted from the shutdown and will continue. The US Peace Corps - https://www.peacecorps.gov/lapse-in-appropriations/.
