= Yalman Onaran =

- Born: 24 February 1969 (age 56); Istanbul, Turkey
- Education: Columbia University's School of Journalism
- Occupation: Financial journalist
- Employer: Bloomberg News

Yalman Onaran is a Turkish-born American financial journalist. He is currently a senior finance writer for Bloomberg News, focusing on global and national banking, Onaran covers global banking, regulation and the politics of finance, writing feature articles about banking issues worldwide, and comparing the problems of European banks to their U.S. counterparts, as well as analysing the effectiveness of new bank regulations.

== Life and career ==
Onaran was born in Istanbul and moved to the United States in 1987 to attend the College of College of Wooster from which he graduated in 1991. Onaran earned graduate degrees from the Columbia University Graduate School of Journalism and from the Columbia University School of International and Public Affairs.

Onaran taught in schools before he became a full-time correspondent for the Associated Press, and moved back to Ankara, Turkey in 1995 to cover wars and politics. Onaran found himself covering the war zones first, then switched to financial journalism. opening the company's Istanbul bureau. Onaran has worked for Bloomberg News since 1998 in various capacities including as Istanbul bureau chief and magazine writer. Onaran moved back to New York City in 2006, where he covered Lehman Brothers and Bear Stearns during the 2008 financial crisis.

In 2013, his book about zombie banks was published, Zombie Banks: How Broken Banks and Debtor Nations are Crippling the Global Economy.

== Publications ==
- Zombie Banks: How Broken Banks and Debtor Nations are Crippling the Global Economy (New York, Wiley, 2011).
- "U.S. Bank Regulators Go Bigger Than Basel, Seek Tougher Capital Rules", Businessweek (July 11, 2013)
- "U.S. Bank Balance Sheets May Hide Risk" Businessweek (February 21, 2013)

Onaran's work has also been published in The New York Times, The Washington Post, the Chicago Tribune, Frankfurter Allgemeine Zeitung and numerous other publications around the world.

== Personal life ==
Onaran is married with a son, and is an avid diver and ice skater. He speaks and reads English, Turkish, German, Russian, Italian and Spanish.
