= Government shutdown =

Cessation of government functions due to failure to fund

A government shutdown occurs when the legislative branch does not pass key bills which fund or authorize the operations of the executive branch, resulting in the cessation of some or all operations of a government. Government shutdowns can reduce public trust in politics.

In presidential systems, the executive branch typically has the authority to keep the government functioning, usually on a reduced level, even without an approved budget. In the United States, the federal government has since 1980 shut down more than 10 times because Congress failed to pass appropriations bills before the previous ones expired. The most recent shutdown affecting more than one department began on January 31, 2026 and ended on February 3, while the Department of Homeland Security remains impacted as of February 14.

The type of shutdowns experienced by the United States are nearly impossible in other forms of government. Under the parliamentary systems used in most European nations, stalemates within the government are less likely, but the executive must maintain the approval of the legislature to remain in power (confidence and supply), and typically an election is triggered if a budget fails to pass (loss of supply).

== Australia ==
The Australian Constitution incorporates mechanisms to prevent a government shutdown by ensuring continuity of governance even during legislative deadlocks. Unlike systems where budgetary impasses can halt government operations, Section 57 of the constitution, allows for a double dissolution, a uniquely Australian mechanism, where both the House of Representatives and the Senate are dissolved simultaneously if the Senate twice rejects or fails to pass a bill approved by the House, with a three-month interval between attempts. This means, if a Government Budget is rejected by the Parliament twice, a full federal election is automatically triggered (normal elections only see half the senate up for re-election), enabling the electorate to resolve the impasse. The constitutional threat of an election has proved more than enough of a threat to force politicians to the negotiating table to pass a budget. These constitutional safeguards, combined with conventions surrounding responsible government and the Governor-General’s reserve powers, help ensure that essential funding and legislative functions continue uninterrupted.

In 1975, the Senate’s refusal to pass supply bills led to a constitutional crisis.

On 11 November 1975, in an attempt to break the deadlock, Prime Minister Gough Whitlam intended to call a half-Senate election, but instead was dismissed by the Governor-General, Sir John Kerr, despite the government retaining a majority in the House of Representatives. The crisis wasn't resolved through a double dissolution but rather through the Governor-General's use of reserve powers to dismiss the Prime Minister and appoint a caretaker government that could secure supply.

== United Kingdom ==
Until the passage of the Fixed-Term Parliaments Act in 2011, government shutdowns in the United Kingdom were impossible due to parliamentary convention. A government that could not command a majority in Parliament would be dismissed—either before the seating of Parliament, if the King's/Queen's Speech were voted down; or later, after a vote of no confidence was passed or a Finance Act or other major bill was voted down.

The Fixed-Term Parliaments Act abolished these conventions, ensuring that new elections could be called only through the explicit passage of a vote of no confidence or if they were called for by a two-thirds majority in the House of Commons. This led to speculation that a government shutdown could have been possible, with the government holding the House standing through tabled votes of no confidence but failing to pass legislation due to internal fighting or the breakdown of a coalition.

An American-style shutdown was also considered to be on the table during Brexit, when some MPs proposed an amendment to "starve the government of cash" and create a "Donald Trump-style shutdown" if a no-deal Brexit were agreed.

In 2022, the Fixed-Term Parliaments Act was repealed by the Dissolution and Calling of Parliament Act, once again rendering a government shutdown virtually impossible.

=== Northern Ireland ===
In January 2017, the Assembly of Northern Ireland a power-sharing agreement collapsed, resulting in the national parliament being unable to pass bills, including critical spending bills. In December, this ongoing event almost resulted in an American-style shutdown, with regional civil services set to run out of money within days. Still, such a shutdown was averted when the British government stepped in to keep local services funded.

== United States ==
A federal government shutdown, in United States politics, occurs when Congress fails to pass legislation or a temporary funding measure to finance the government before the current one expires. It causes a full or partial cessation of activities and services by federal government operations and agencies, which must suspend non-essential operations, furlough non-essential workers, and only retain essential employees in departments covering the safety of human life and/or protection of property. Voluntary services in essential areas may only be accepted during emergencies. Shutdowns may also occur at state, territorial, and local levels of government.

Funding gaps did not lead to government shutdowns until 1980, when Attorney General Benjamin Civiletti issued two legal opinions stating that such was prescribed by the 1884 Antideficiency Act. These opinions were not consistently adhered to through the 1980s, but since 1990 all funding gaps lasting longer than a few hours have led to a shutdown. As of 24 October 2026, there have been 23 federal funding gaps since the U.S. government adopted its current budget and appropriations process in 1976; 10 have led to federal employees being furloughed.

Some of the most significant have included the 21-day shutdown of 1995–1996 during the Bill Clinton administration over opposition to major spending cuts; the 16-day shutdown in 2013 during the Barack Obama administration caused by a dispute over implementation of the Patient Protection and Affordable Care Act; and the 35-day shutdown of 2018-2019 during the first Donald Trump administration caused by a dispute over the funding amount for an expansion of the U.S.–Mexico border barrier. On September 30, 2023, a government shutdown was averted just hours before the actual shutdown after a 45-day funding bill passed in both the House of Representatives and the Senate. The shutdown that began on October 1, 2025 and ended on November 12, 2025 was the longest-ever.

Shutdowns disrupt government services and programs, including by closing national parks and institutions (in particular, due to shortages of federal employees). Government revenue is reduced by loss of fees and the lost labor from furloughed employees. Shutdowns also reduce economic growth. In 2013, Standard & Poor's, the financial ratings agency, said the then-ongoing shutdown had "to date taken $24 billion out of the economy", and "shaved at least 0.6 percent off annualized fourth-quarter 2013 GDP growth".

== See also ==
- Budget crisis – Deadlock blocking the passage of a budget
- Cabinet crisis – Mass resignation, or threat thereof, of top-level government advisers
- Constitutional crisis – Conflict a governing law is unable to resolve
- Gridlock – Political stalemate
- Lockout – Work stoppage by management of a company
- Political stability – Smoothly functioning political system
