= 1981, 1984, and 1986 U.S. federal government shutdowns =

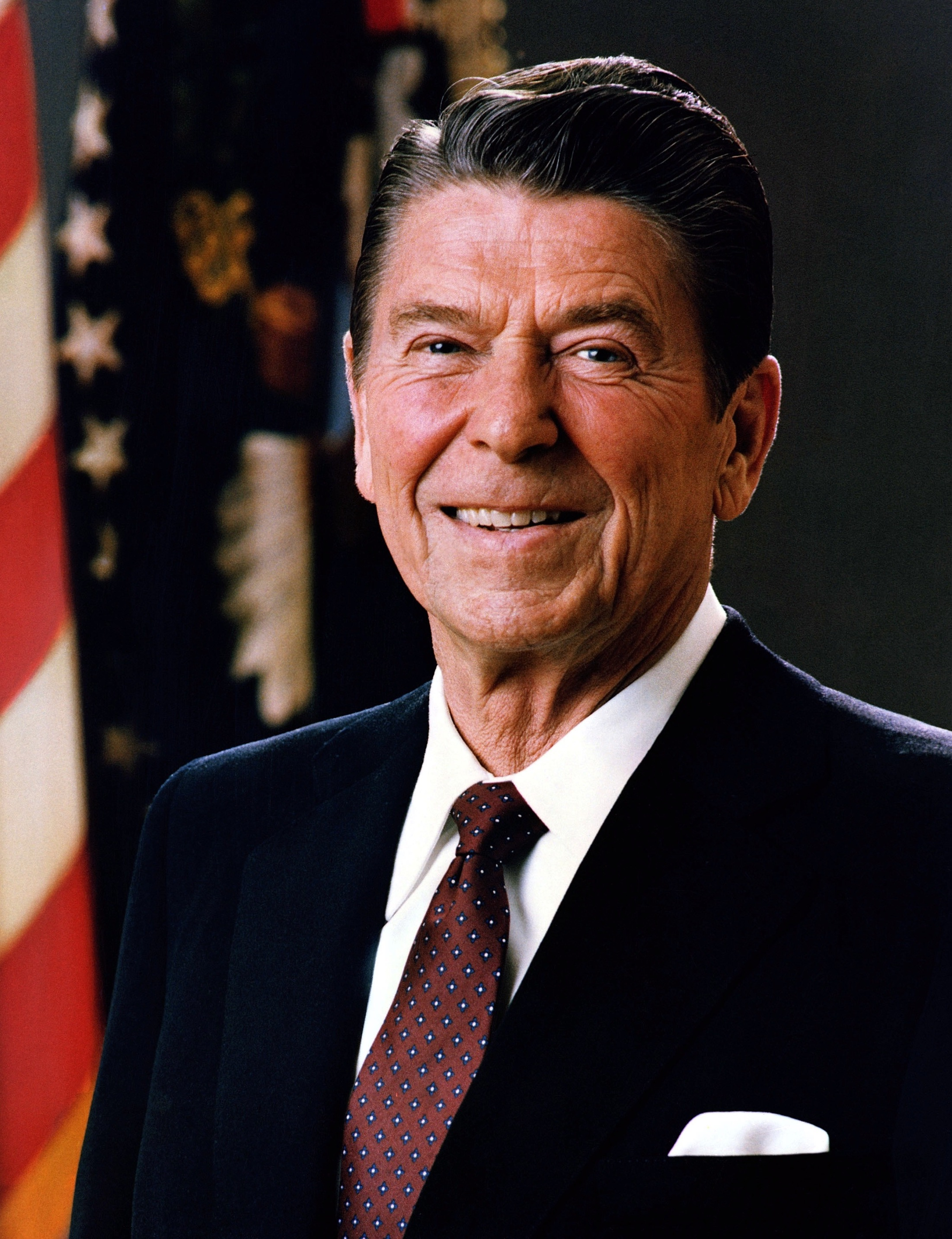
During the Reagan Administration, government shutdowns were not uniformly enforced during funding gaps, but workers were furloughed on three occasions.

Three government shutdowns in 1981, 1984, and 1986 involved federal employees being furloughed for brief periods. The shutdowns were generally used by President Ronald Reagan to pressure Congress about specific provisions in appropriations bills, or to encourage Congress to pass the bills more quickly.

The first of them took place in November 1981. Reagan had vetoed a proposed appropriation bill that contained fewer spending cuts than he had proposed, the first veto of his administration. The second one took place in October 1984. Reagan had mounted opposition towards a water projects package and a civil rights measure that would have reversed the Supreme Court decision Grove City College v. Bell. Another point of contention with Congress was a ban on funding for covert operations in Nicaragua proposed by Senator Daniel Inouye. The third and last one took place in October 1986. Reagan wanted to pressure Congress to agree on a full-year omnibus appropriations bill more quickly.

== Overview ==
Prior to 1980, federal funding gaps caused by the expiration of appropriations legislation did not lead to government shutdowns. However, in April 1980, Attorney General Benjamin Civiletti issued an opinion that the 1884 Antideficiency Act did require agencies to shut down during a funding gap. The 1980 federal government shutdown, during the Carter Administration, was the first.

Shutdowns during the Reagan administration tended to be short and did not garner widespread notice. The Antideficiency Act was not uniformly enforced, and many funding gaps still did not lead to shutdowns at all. Examples include a brief funding gap in 1982 where nonessential workers were told to report to work but to cancel meetings and not perform their ordinary duties, and a three-day funding gap in November 1983 that did not disrupt government services.

== 1981 shutdown ==
A recorded message used by the White House telephone switchboard during the 1981 shutdown

Prior to the 1981 shutdown, only the Legislative Branch appropriations bill had been passed. Reagan vetoed a proposed appropriation bill that contained fewer spending cuts than he had proposed, the first veto of his administration.

Funding lapsed on November 22, but since that day was a Saturday there was no effect. The next day, 241,000 federal employees were placed into furlough. However, many government departments furloughed few or no people as they were present for activities to initiate the shutdown. More employees would have been furloughed if the shutdown had extended to an additional day. Economists of the time believed that it cost taxpayers an estimated $80–90 million in back pay and other expenses.

== 1984 shutdown ==
The second shutdown occurred on the afternoon of October 4, 1984, after Reagan mounted opposition towards a water projects package and a civil rights measure that would have reversed the Supreme Court decision Grove City College v. Bell. Another point of contention was a ban on funding for covert operations in Nicaragua proposed by Senator Daniel Inouye.

500,000 federal employees were placed on furlough for the afternoon. The shutdown covered nine of the 13 appropriations bills. Bills had already been passed for the Legislative and Judicial Branches; the Departments of State, Justice, Commerce, and Housing and Urban Development; and independent agencies, so these were not subject to the shutdown.

Congress removed the water projects, civil rights, and covert operations measures of the appropriations bill, ending the shutdown. Economists estimated that the short period cost taxpayers an estimated $65 million in back pay. This was the first shutdown where Congress approved legislation providing back pay to federal employees.

== 1986 shutdown ==
Reagan initially threatened to veto a continuing resolution and begin a government shutdown that would have begun on October 12, 1986, in order to pressure Congress to agree on a full-year omnibus appropriations bill more quickly. However, he relented and signed it that day due to progress in a compromise regarding the bill's arms control provisions. The bill had to be sent to Reykjavík in Iceland for Reagan to sign, as he was there for a meeting with Soviet leader Mikhail Gorbachev.

However, after that continuing resolution expired, a shutdown occurred for an afternoon on October 17, 1986, in which 500,000 federal employees were furloughed. All government agencies were affected by this shutdown. It ended after Congress passed the omnibus appropriations bill later that day. Economists estimated that this shutdown cost the U.S. government $62 million in lost work.
