= Government shutdowns in the United States =

Service reductions due to a funding lapse

In the United States, a government shutdown, officially known as a lapse in appropriations, occurs when funding legislation required to finance the federal government is not enacted before the next fiscal year begins. During a shutdown, the federal government curtails agency activities and services, ceases non-essential operations, furloughs non-essential workers, and retains only essential employees in departments that protect human life or property. Shutdowns can also disrupt state, territorial, and local levels of government.

Funding gaps have led to shutdowns since 1980, when Attorney General Benjamin Civiletti issued a legal opinion requiring it. This opinion was not consistently adhered to throughout the 1980s, but since 1990, all funding gaps lasting more than a few hours have led to shutdowns. As of November 2025, 11 funding gaps have led to federal employees being furloughed.

The most significant historical shutdowns include the first shutdown under Donald Trump's second presidency, which began on October 1, 2025, and lasted for 43 days; the 35-day shutdown of 2018–2019 during President Trump's first presidency, over expanding barriers on the U.S.–Mexico border; the shutdown of the Department of Homeland Security also under Donald Trump's second presidency, which began on February 14, 2026, and lasted for 76 days; the 21-day shutdown of 1995–1996 during the Bill Clinton administration, over opposition to major spending cuts; and the 16-day shutdown in 2013 during the Barack Obama administration, over implementation of the Affordable Care Act. The other seven shutdowns lasted five or fewer days.

Shutdowns disrupt many government services and programs. They close national parks and other public institutions (such as Washington, D.C.'s federally managed museums), reduce government revenue, and reduce economic growth by disrupting major services. During the 2013 shutdown, financial-rating institution Standard & Poor's said that the shutdown had "to date taken $24 billion out of the economy" and "shaved at least 0.6 percent off annualized fourth-quarter 2013 GDP growth".

== Federal government ==
=== Overview ===
Under the separation of powers created by the United States Constitution, the appropriation and control of government funds for the United States is the sole responsibility of the United States Congress. Congress begins this process through proposing an appropriation bill aimed at determining the levels of spending for each federal department and government program. The finalized version of the bill is then voted upon by both the House of Representatives and the Senate. After it passes both chambers, it is sent to the President of the United States to sign it into law.

The Antideficiency Act of 1870 makes it illegal for any government official to make payments or enter into contracts in excess of congressional appropriations. Although the Act was enacted in 1870, it was not until 1980 that the Department of Justice issued legal opinions interpreting the Act as requiring government shutdowns during funding lapses.

Government shutdowns tend to occur when there is a disagreement over budget allocations before the existing cycle ends. Such disagreements can come from the president – through vetoing or threatening to veto any finalized appropriation bills they receive – or from one or both chambers of Congress, often from the political party that has control over that chamber. A shutdown can be temporarily avoided through the enactment of a continuing resolution (CR), which can extend funding for the government for a set period, during which time negotiations can be made to supply an appropriation bill that all involved parties of the political deadlock on spending can agree upon.

A CR can be blocked by the same parties if there are issues with the content of the resolution bill that either party has a disagreement with, in which case a shutdown will inevitably occur if a CR cannot be passed by the House, Senate or president. Congress may, in rare cases, attempt to override a presidential veto of an appropriation bill or CR. Such an act requires majority support of two-thirds of both chambers.

Before 1980, many federal agencies continued to operate during shutdowns, while minimizing all nonessential operations and obligations, believing that Congress did not intend agencies to close while waiting for the enactment of annual appropriations acts or temporary appropriations. In 1980 and 1981, Attorney General Benjamin Civiletti issued two opinions that more strictly interpreted the Antideficiency Act in the context of a funding gap, along with its exceptions. The opinions stated that, with some exceptions, the head of an agency could avoid violating the Act only by suspending the agency's operations until the enactment of an appropriation. The 1981 opinion established that "a government agency may employ personal services in advance of appropriations only when there is a reasonable and articulable connection between the function to be performed and the safety of human life or the protection of property." These opinions formalized the "life and property exception" that determines which federal employees are considered "excepted" and must continue working during shutdowns without pay. However, even after the Civiletti opinions, not all funding gaps led to shutdowns. Of the nine funding gaps between 1980 and 1990, only four led to furloughs.

Members of Congress of both parties have proposed legislation to end the practice of government shutdowns, and bipartisan support has been strongest for automatic continuing appropriations at prior funding levels. One version would also require Congress and the Office of Management and Budget to remain in Washington, D.C., until new appropriations legislation is enacted, and September 2025 polling found 76% support for and 6% opposition to that approach.

In practice, analysts and federal guidance distinguish between a "full" shutdown and a "partial" shutdown. In a full shutdown, none of the 12 annual appropriations are in force, and most federal government services cease, with some exceptions. In a partial shutdown, only some of the 12 bills have been enacted, so only unfunded departments and programs shut down. For example, the 2018–19 episode was a partial shutdown because Congress had already enacted 5 of the 12 regular appropriations, and only the unfunded agencies were shut down.

=== Effects ===
In surveys regarding US government shutdowns, Republicans have received more blame than Democrats, though a substantial portion of survey respondents said they were not sure.

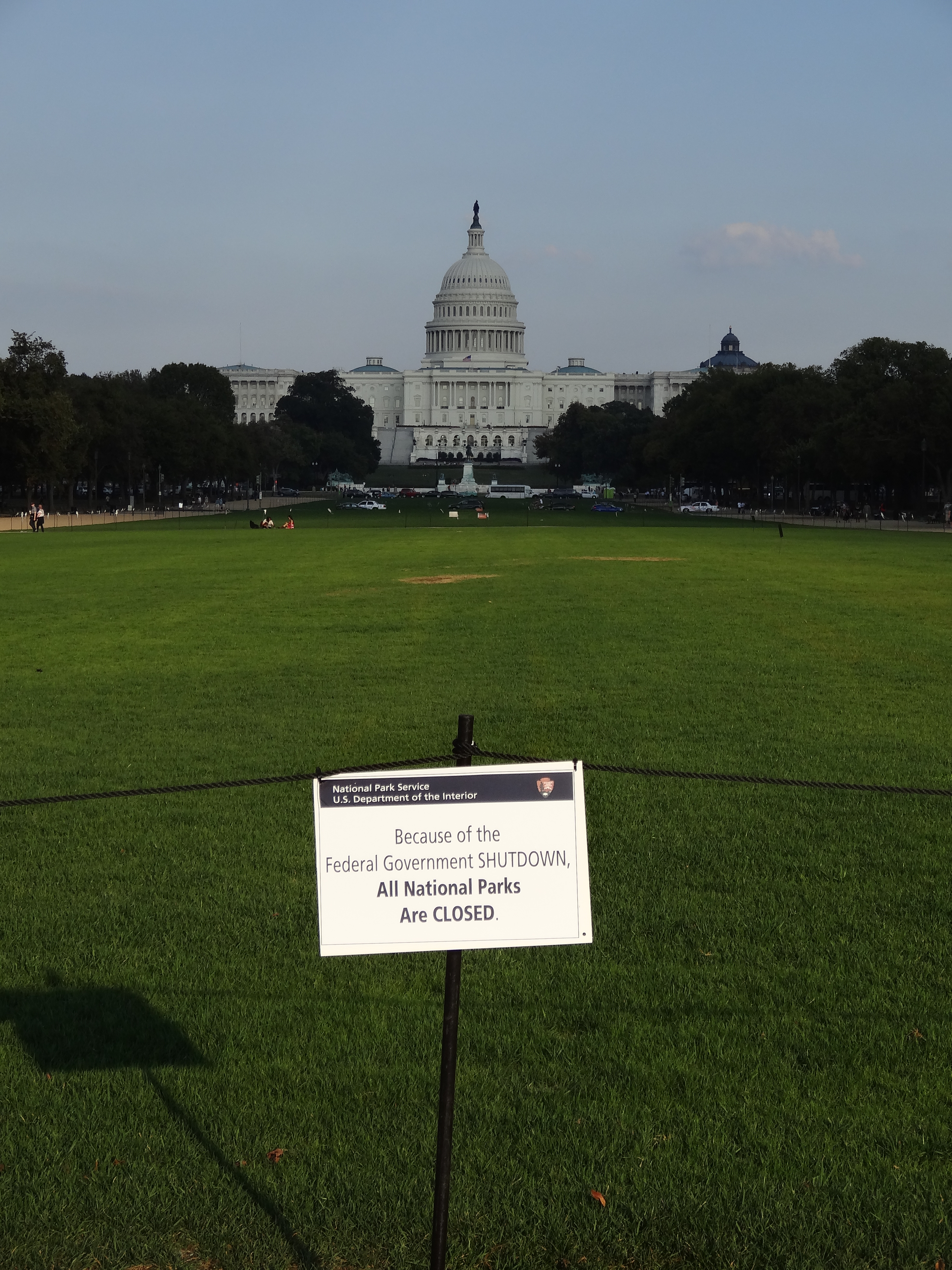
Units of the National Park System closed during the 2013 federal government shutdown. Shown here is the National Mall.

While government shutdowns before 1995–1996 had very mild effects, a full federal government shutdown causes a large number of civilian federal employees to be furloughed. Such employees are forbidden even to check their e-mail, a prohibition that some agencies enforce by collecting government-issued electronic devices for the duration of the shutdown.

Because of the size of the government workforce, the effects of a shutdown can be seen in macroeconomic data. During the 2013 shutdown, for example, 800,000 employees were locked out, payment was delayed to 1.3 million workers, confidence in the job market decreased for a month, and GDP growth slowed 0.1–0.2%. The loss of GDP was greater than it would have cost to keep the government open. Similarly, the 2018–19 shutdown reduced the level of GDP growth by 0.1% in the fourth quarter of 2018 ($3 billion in 2019 dollars) and by 0.2% in the first quarter of 2019 ($8 billion). Some of the loss could be recovered, but around $3 billion of real GDP (0.02% of real GDP of 2019) was estimated as unrecoverable.

The complete effects of a shutdown are often clouded by missing data that cannot be collected while specific government offices are closed.

Some effects of the shutdown are difficult to measure and can linger afterward, such as destroyed scientific studies, lack of investment, and deferred maintenance costs. The 2018–2019 shutdown curtailed safety and law enforcement investigations, caused air travel delays as essential workers stopped showing up, shut down some facilities for Native Americans and tourists, and delayed regulatory approvals and immigration hearings for non-detainees.

The exact details of which government functions stop during a shutdown is determined by the Office of Management and Budget (OMB).

==== What stays open ====
- "Emergency personnel" continue to be employed, including the active duty (Title 10) military, federal law enforcement, doctors and nurses working in federal hospitals, and air traffic controllers.
- Certain agencies continue their day-to-day operation with minimal staffing, including the National Weather Service, the Army Corps of Engineers, and parts of NASA.
- The Department of the Interior provides specific guidance on operations during shutdowns, including which services continue and which are suspended.
- Members of Congress continue to be paid, because their pay cannot be altered except by direct law.
- Mail delivery is not affected as the United States Postal Service is self-funded and the funds are not appropriated by Congress.
- Some offices, such as the Patent and Trademark Office, can rely on operating reserves to remain open for a few months.
- Sometimes, the Washington, D.C. municipal government remains open. For example, during the 2013 shutdown, the city remained open because mayor Vincent C. Gray declared the entire municipal government to be essential.
- The Congressional Budget Office continues operations during shutdowns as it has been instructed by the House and Senate Budget Committees to continue providing support to meet the immediate needs of Congress in carrying out its constitutional functions.

==== What is shut down ====
- For the Department of Defense, at least half of the civilian workforce, and the full-time, dual-status military technicians in the US National Guard and traditional Guardsmen (those on Title 32 status), are furloughed and not paid while the shutdown is in effect.
- Programs that are funded by laws other than annual appropriations acts (like Social Security) may also be affected by a funding gap, if program execution relies on activities that receive annually appropriated funding.

=== Economic costs of shutdowns ===
According to the Committee for a Responsible Federal Budget, government shutdowns typically cost more money than they save. Evidence shows that implementing contingency plans, lost user fees, contractor premiums for uncertainty, and guaranteed back pay to furloughed employees negate potential savings. The Congressional Budget Office estimated that the 2018–2019 shutdown reduced GDP by $11 billion total, including $3 billion that would never be recovered.

The Office of Management and Budget (OMB) estimated that the 2013 shutdown resulted in $2.5 billion in pay and benefits paid to furloughed employees for hours not worked, as well as roughly $10 million in penalty interest payments and lost fee collections.

=== Debate ===
During the 2013 shutdown, the moral philosopher Peter Singer argued in Slate that shutdowns were evidence that the U.S. Constitution's separation of powers constituted "a fundamental flaw".

In 2019, following the end of the 2018–19 shutdown, Michael Shindler argued in The American Conservative that shutdowns protect popular sovereignty. He writes, "No other political phenomena so forcefully and dramatically obliges the whole people to recognize that their ideological divisions have become so great that the exercise of their sovereignty has become virtually impossible", and "During a shutdown, the government, which is bound by elaborate mechanisms to the national will, becomes confused. For a moment, it seems as if the march of American history is at a standstill. There are only two means of moving forward: either government officials follow the will of something other than the nation or the nation engages in a momentous reconciliation of its will."

In 2024, Michelle Buehlmann argued that government shutdowns are a form of brinkmanship. Elected officials use them to coerce their opponents into conceding.

In September 2025, Ezra Klein, arguing in favor of shutting down the government by the end of that month, said that people voting in favor of funding a corrupting government is an act of complicity in that corruption, and that shutting the government down is a form of resistance against said government even if the end outcome of the shutdown is uncertain. In addition, he argued that a shutdown can draw media attention to the negative traits of those opposed to it.

=== List of federal shutdowns ===
This list includes only major funding gaps which led to employee furloughs within federal departments of the US government. It does not include funding gaps that did not involve shutdowns of government departments, including, for example, a brief funding gap in 1982 in which nonessential workers were told to report to work but to cancel meetings and not perform their ordinary duties; a brief funding gap in November 1983 that did not disrupt government services; a 9-hour funding gap in February 2018 that did not disrupt government services; and a 13-hour funding gap in March 2024 that did not furlough any workers. As the finances of the government are tracked on a daily basis, the Office of Management and Budget (OMB) can direct federal agencies to continue normal operations even if the shutdown deadline is passed if there is a high probability that a new funding resolution will be passed by Congress quickly enough, which occurred in December 2024 during a vote for a continuing resolution for fiscal year 2025.

Overview of shutdowns involving furloughs
Year	Days	Agencies affected	Employees furloughed	Cost to government	President	Congress	Majority		Ref.
Year	Days	Agencies affected	Employees furloughed	Cost to government	President	Congress	Senate	House	Ref.
1980	1	FTC	1,600	$700,000	Jimmy Carter	96th	Democratic (58 – 41 – 1)	Democratic (277 – 157 – 1)	
1981	4	All (except Legislative Branch)	241,000	$80–90 million	Ronald Reagan	97th	Republican (53 – 46 – 1)	Democratic (242 – 192 – 1)	
1984	1 (Note: ~4 hours)	Some	500,000	$65 million	Ronald Reagan	98th	Republican (55 – 45)	Democratic (269 – 165 – 1)	
1986	1	All	500,000	$62.2 million	Ronald Reagan	99th	Republican (53 – 47)	Democratic (253 – 181 – 1)	
1990	3	All	2,800	$2.57 million	George H. W. Bush	101st	Democratic (55 – 45)	Democratic (267 – 167 – 1)	
1995 (Nov)	6	Some	800,000	$400 million	Bill Clinton	104th	Republican (53 – 47)	Republican (232 – 202 – 1)	
1995–96	21	Some	284,000	$400 million	Bill Clinton	104th	Republican (53 – 47)	Republican (232 – 202 – 1)	
2013	16	All	800,000	$2.1 billion	Barack Obama	113th	Democratic (53 – 45 – 2)	Republican (234 – 201)	
2018 (Jan)	3	All	692,900	Unknown	Donald Trump (1st term)	115th	Republican (50/51 (Note: Senator Jon Kyl (R) resigned on December 31, 2018, during the shutdown.) – 47 – 2)	Republican (241 – 194)	
2018–19	35	Some	380,000	$5 billion	Donald Trump (1st term)	115th	Republican (50/51 – 47 – 2)	Republican (241 – 194)	
2018–19	35	Some	380,000	$5 billion	Donald Trump (1st term)	116th (Note: The first session of the 116th Congress began on January 3, 2019, during the shutdown.)	Republican (53 – 45 – 2)	Democratic (235 – 199)	
2025	43	All	900,000	$11 billion	Donald Trump (2nd term)	119th	Republican (53 – 45 – 2)	Republican (219 – 213)	
2026 (Jan – Feb)	4	Some	Unknown	Unknown	Donald Trump (2nd term)	119th	Republican (53 – 45 – 2)	Republican (218 – 213)	
2026 (Feb – Apr)	76	DHS	Unknown	Unknown	Donald Trump (2nd term)	119th	Republican (53 – 45 – 2)	Republican (217 – 214 – 1)	

==== 1980 ====
On May 1, 1980, during the presidential term of Jimmy Carter, the Federal Trade Commission (FTC) was shut down for one day after Congress failed to pass an appropriations bill for the agency. Before the shutdown, a review had been made of the 1884 Antideficiency Act regarding Congressional approval of agency funding. Initial opinion on the subject had been that this did not require a government agency to be closed down in the wake of the expiration of their funding, before Attorney General Benjamin Civiletti overruled this opinion with his own on April 25, 1980, stating that a provision of this act stipulated to the contrary. Five days later, the FTC was shut down after Congress delayed funding for the agency, in order to seek approval for an authorization bill to limit the agency's investigative and rule-making abilities, following criticism of the FTC's aggressive monitoring of the economy.

The 1980 shutdown was the first time a federal agency shut down due to a budget dispute. Around 1,600 federal workers for the FTC were furloughed as a result, and Federal Marshals deployed to some FTC facilities to enforce their closure. The shutdown ended after one day when Carter threatened to close down the entire US government if Congress did not pass spending bills by October 1 later that year. Economists of the time estimated that the one-day shutdown of the FTC cost the government around $700,000, the majority of which was back-pay for the furloughed workers. In the aftermath of the shutdown, Civiletti issued a revised edition of his original opinion on January 18, 1981, detailing that shutdowns would still require agencies that protect human safety or property to continue operating if funding for them expired.

==== 1981, 1984, and 1986 ====
A recorded message used by the White House telephone switchboard during the 1981 shutdown

In 1981, 1984, and 1986, federal employees were furloughed during both presidential terms of Ronald Reagan. The deadlocks focused on disagreements by Reagan towards Congressional bills that went against his political beliefs and goals. The first shutdown took place on November 23, 1981, lasting for a day and placing 241,000 federal employees into furlough, after Reagan vetoed a proposed appropriation bill that contained a reduced set of spending cuts than he had proposed for select government departments. While the shutdown affected only a number of government departments, economists of the time believed that it cost taxpayers an estimated $80–90 million in back pay and other expenses over the entire day.

The second shutdown occurred on the afternoon of October 4, 1984, with 500,000 federal employees placed on furlough during this period, after Reagan mounted opposition towards the inclusion of a water projects package and a civil rights measure within the proposed appropriations bill that day. The shutdown covered around nine of the 13 appropriations bills that had not been passed at that point. Congress was forced to remove both of the opposed elements of the bill and include funding of the Nicaraguan Contras as a compromise to end the shutdown. Economists believed that the short period cost taxpayers an estimated $65 million in back pay.

A third shutdown occurred for an afternoon on October 17, 1986, in which 500,000 federal employees were furloughed, in order to pressure Congress to agree on a full-year omnibus appropriations bill more quickly. All government agencies were affected by this shutdown. It ended after Congress passed the omnibus appropriations bill later that day. Economists estimated that this shutdown cost the U.S. government $62 million in lost work.

==== 1990 ====
The shutdown of 1990 occurred during the presidential term of George H. W. Bush and focused on a disagreement over several measures he proposed for the 1991 appropriations bill – the inclusion of major tax increases, despite Bush's campaign promise against any new taxes, and major cuts in spending towards benefit programs, including Medicare, to combat the deficit. On October 5, 1990, liberal Democrats and conservative Republicans, led by then House Minority Whip Newt Gingrich, opposed the initial appropriations package, with Bush vetoing the second resolution to the spending bill the following day on October 6.

The shutdown lasted until October 9, when Bush agreed to remove his proposed tax increases and reduce the amount of spending cuts, in return for Congress providing a concession on the amended bill to allow for increasing income tax on the wealthy. The effects of the deadlock were lessened due to the fact that the shutdown occurred across the Columbus Day weekend – October 6 to 8. Over this period, 2,800 workers were furloughed. The national parks and museums, such as the Smithsonian, were closed, and a handful of departments unable to function. The cost to the government for lost revenue and back wages was estimated at $2.57 million.

==== 1995–1996 ====
Between 1995 and 1996, the United States experienced two government shutdowns during Bill Clinton's presidency. They occurred after Clinton rejected 1996 spending bills proposed by congressional Republicans, who held majorities in both chambers, led by House Speaker Newt Gingrich.

Both Gingrich and the majority of Congress sought to pass bills that would reduce government spending, much against Clinton's political objectives for 1996. Clinton objected to funding cuts affecting education, the environment, and public health. One proposed bill threatened to block a scheduled reduction he had planned towards premiums within Medicare. Both sides had differing opinions over the impact the proposed House bills would have over economic growth, medical inflation, and anticipated revenues, with Clinton vetoing the bills over amendments added to them by congressional Republicans, despite Gingrich threatening to refuse to raise the country's debt ceiling.

The first shutdown took place on November 14, 1995, after a CR issued on October 1 had expired, and meetings between Democratic and Republican leaders failed to end the deadlock. The effect of the deadlock led to the majority of government departments being closed down and 800,000 federal workers being furloughed as a result. Although the shutdown ended five days later on November 19, the political friction between Clinton and Gingrich over the US budget remained unresolved. On December 16, 1995, after further spending bills failed to secure approval, a second shutdown took place. Although lasting 21 days, fewer departments were closed down, and around 284,000 federal workers were furloughed during this period. The shutdown was eventually ended on January 6, 1996, when White House and Congressional negotiators worked out a balanced budget agreement, which included approval towards modest spending cuts and tax increases.

Both shutdowns had a contrasting impact on the major political players in the deadlock. Gingrich's political career was harmed by the shutdowns, in part due to a comment he made during the deadlock that made it sound like his reasons for it were petty. Clinton's presidential term was improved by the shutdown and cited as part of the reason behind his successful re-election to the White House in 1996.

Some effects of the shutdowns included the government, tourism, and airline industry losing millions of dollars in revenue during this period, with disruptions made towards the processing of passports and visas, and work on medical research and toxic waste cleanup being halted.

==== 2013 ====
Letter from President Barack Obama to US Government employees affected by the shutdown in 2013

The shutdown of 2013 occurred during Obama's second term, focusing on a disagreement between Republican-led House of Representatives and the Democratic-led Senate towards the contents of the 2014 Continuing Appropriations Resolution bill, alongside other political issues. Congressional Republicans, encouraged by conservative senators such as Ted Cruz, and conservative groups such as Heritage Action, sought to include several measures to the bill in late 2013 that could delay funding for the 2013 Affordable Care Act (ACA) and thus allow time for changes to be made to the act. Both Obama and Democratic senators refused to agree to these measures, seeking instead for the bill to maintain government funding at then-current sequestration levels with no additional conditions.

The shutdown took place on October 1, 2013, as a result of an impasse over the contents of the bill, with the House unable to approve any CRs before this date. Democrats opposed further efforts by congressional Republicans, led by House Speaker John Boehner, to delay funding of the ACA, and rejected piecemeal resolution bills proposed by them to resolve the shutdown. As Congress was at an impasse amidst rising concerns that the US would default on public debt, US senators – particularly then Senate Minority Leader Mitch McConnell and then Senate Majority Leader Harry Reid – negotiated a deal to end the deadlock.

Their proposal, which won a Senate vote, approved an amended Resolution bill that would keep funding at sequestration levels, temporarily suspend the debt limit until February 7, 2014, and included a concession to congressional Republicans on the ACA by applying stricter income verification rules in regards to health insurance. Boehner eventually withdrew further objections and delaying attempts against the ACA upon the country being within hours of breaking its debt limit on October 16, 2013. Congress approved the bill for Obama's signature the following day.

The 16-day shutdown had considerable impact upon the United States: approximately 800,000 federal employees were put on furlough, while an additional 1.3 million had to report to work without any known payment dates during this period, costing the government millions in back pay; major government programmes concerning Native Americans, children, and domestic violence victims, alongside the legal processing of asylum and immigration cases, and sexual assault cases handled by the Office of Civil Rights, were badly disrupted by the shutdown; tourism was greatly impacted due to the closure of national parks and institutions during the shutdown and cost the government millions in lost revenue; and US economic growth was reduced during this period. In political circles, the shutdown had a negative impact on Republicans, as over half of Americans held Republicans accountable for the deadlock, in comparison to public opinion on the accountability of both the Democrats and Obama during this period.

==== January 2018 ====
The shutdown of January 2018 was the first to occur during the first presidential term of Donald Trump and was centered around a disagreement on the issue of immigration. By the start of October 2017, Congress had failed to approve an appropriation bill to fund the US government in 2018, and instead passed three CRs to keep federal agencies open until January 19, 2018. The failure to establish a permanent spending bill was due to Democratic senators insisting that any proposed House bill needed to include funding for the Deferred Action for Childhood Arrivals (DACA) immigration policy and assurances against deportation for immigrants that fell under the DREAM Act. Republicans refused to pass such bills, citing that discussions on immigration and those individuals under DACA would not be held until mid-March of the following year.

A Senate vote to extend the 2018 Continuing Appropriations Resolution on January 19, 2018, which had passed a congressional vote the previous day, failed to achieve a majority, after Democratic senators led a filibuster aimed at forcing Republicans to invoke a shorter duration of CR and thus invoke negotiations that could lead to extensions of the DACA policy. but failed to achieve a majority, as Democrats sought a shorter duration of CAR to force negotiations.

The shutdown took place on January 20, 2018, and led to approximately 692,000 federal workers being furloughed. An attempt by Democrats to protect the payment of military personnel during the deadlock was rejected by Republicans, after then-Senate Majority Leader Mitch McConnell stated that funding had to be restored for the entire US government rather than for individual government branches. Despite the bill's failure, both sides engaged in negotiations that eventually culminated with a deal on a proposed stopgap measure to fund the government for four weeks – as part of the proposal, Democrats agreed to end their filibuster and approve the Republican's measure, in exchange for fresh talks on the DACA policy and DREAM Act within newly proposed Resolution bill. The measure was approved in the House and passed a Senate vote, effectively ending the shutdown on January 23.

The impact of the shutdown was not as severe as in previous deadlocks – most government departments, such as the Department of Energy and the Environmental Protection Agency, were able to continue their functions during the 3-day deadlock despite their workers needing back-pay in the aftermath, and only a third of National Parks in the United States were closed down. In the aftermath of the shutdown, the Senate debated on a bill for the 2018 Bipartisan Budget Act to provide 2-year funding for the military, and provide an extension to the Resolution to keep the government funded for another six weeks. However, the negotiations suffered delays that triggered the brief February 9 spending gap, though this merely lasted for nine hours, causing little disruption.

==== December 2018–January 2019 ====
The shutdown of December 2018 – January 2019 was the second to occur during Donald Trump's first presidential term and was due to a disagreement over negotiations for the Mexico–United States border wall. Trump sought to have the appropriation bill for 2019 include $5.7 billion in funding toward construction of the wall. Democrats viewed the wall as a waste of money and likely ineffective, and instead proposed bills that would fund improvements in existing border security measures. Trump initially backed down on demands for border wall funding, but reversed this decision on December 20, 2018, over pressure from supporters, refusing to sign any continuing resolution that did not include it.

The shutdown began on December 22, 2018, after Democrats refused to support a new continuing resolution in the Senate that included approximately $5 billion for the new border wall, and continued to block further attempts upon taking control of Congress on January 3, 2019, following the 2018 mid-term elections. Although he had support from several Republicans, including Senate Majority Leader Mitch McConnell, Trump faced stiff opposition to border wall funding from House Speaker Nancy Pelosi and Senate Minority Leader Chuck Schumer, with neither party able to break the political impasse through negotiations, rallying public support through televised addresses, offering proposals on alternative border security funding measures, or making concessions for a proposed appropriation bill with regards to the DACA policy.

The 35-day shutdown surpassed the 21-day shutdown of 1995–1996 to become the then-longest government shutdown in US history. It led to 380,000 federal workers being furloughed, and an additional 420,000 workers were required to work without any known payment dates, forcing many to find other paid work or protest against the extended period of the deadlock. Sharp reductions had to be made on payments from the Supplemental Nutrition Assistance Program, the Internal Revenue Service faced delays in processing around $140 billion worth of tax refunds, the FBI faced major disruptions to some of its investigations, staff shortages in the Transportation Security Administration caused airports to be closed down, and economic growth was reduced by billions of dollars.

The deadlock ended on January 25, 2019, when both chambers of Congress approved a plan to reopen the US government for 3 weeks, in order to facilitate negotiations for a suitable appropriation bill; Trump endorsed the plan amidst rising security and safety concerns. A source inside the White House told CNN that a "contributing catalyst" to the end of the shutdown was a significant number of absences of air traffic controllers, which caused significant flight delays and cancellations.

According to the Congressional Budget Office, the shutdown cost the government $3 billion in back pay for furloughed workers, plus $2 billion in lost tax revenues due to reduced tax evasion compliance activities by the Internal Revenue Service, and a smaller amount of lost fees such as for visits to national parks, for a total of about $5 billion.

==== 2025 ====
In late September 2025, a White House meeting took place between U.S. President Donald Trump and his Democratic opponents, aimed at preventing a government shutdown. President Trump and Senate Democrats did not reach an agreement at the meeting. Trump officials signaled that they planned to conduct mass firings if the government shut down.

On October 1, 2025, at 12:00 a.m. Eastern Daylight Time (EDT), the US government shut down after Senate Democrats blocked a continuing resolution passed by the Republican-controlled House of Representatives. Senate Democrats voted against the Republican appropriations legislation because it lacked an extension of Affordable Care Act (ACA) subsidies that were temporarily expanded under the American Rescue Plan Act of 2021.

The continuing resolution was blocked 14 times before an agreement was reached on November 10, 2025, in which the Senate passed the revised appropriations bill without the ACA subsidy extension. Instead, Senate Republicans promised to hold a vote to extend the health care subsidies by mid-December. The House of Representatives passed the Senate's revised bill on November 12, which was signed by the U.S. president, Donald Trump, later that day. In total, the shutdown lasted 43 days, resulting in the longest shutdown in U.S. history.

===== Day 20 crisis and SNAP funding shortage =====
By October 20, 2025—day 20 of what had become the third-longest shutdown in U.S. history—the crisis deepened significantly as the Supplemental Nutrition Assistance Program (SNAP) faced a critical funding shortage. The USDA warned that approximately 42 million Americans could lose food assistance beginning in November if the shutdown continued. SNAP only had contingency funding available through the end of October, with an estimated $2 billion shortfall for November benefits alone, as the program required approximately $8 billion for November while only $6 billion in contingency funds remained available.

On October 16, 2025, USDA acting SNAP administrator Ronald Ward sent a memo to all state agencies instructing them to halt the process of issuing November benefits until further notice, stating that "if the current lapse in appropriations continues, there will be insufficient funds to pay full November SNAP benefits for approximately 42 million individuals across the Nation." Multiple states, including Pennsylvania, Texas, Oregon, West Virginia, Minnesota, Illinois, New York, and Colorado, announced they would be unable to distribute November SNAP benefits if the shutdown extended past late October. Pennsylvania's Department of Human Services posted a notice stating: "Because Republicans in Washington D.C., failed to pass a federal budget, causing the federal government shutdown, November 2025 SNAP benefits cannot be paid."

This SNAP crisis coincided with the November 1 deadline for implementing expanded SNAP work requirements and eligibility restrictions enacted earlier in 2025, which were projected to result in additional millions of Americans losing benefits due to new restrictions even if the shutdown ended. Agriculture Secretary Brooke Rollins confirmed the urgency of the situation, stating: "We're going to run out of money in two weeks. So you're talking about millions and millions of vulnerable families, of hungry families that are not going to have access to these programs because of this shutdown."

===== Federal employee and military impact =====
During the 2025 government shutdown, President Donald Trump planned to terminate approximately 4,100 probationary federal employees as part of a workforce reduction initiative. However, a federal judge in San Francisco temporarily blocked the layoffs, ruling that the planned firings were likely unlawful. The decision came after labor unions and nonprofit organizations filed lawsuits on behalf of the affected workers, arguing that the administration had bypassed standard legal procedures. The ruling underscored ongoing legal and political disputes over federal employment practices during the Trump administration.

On October 17, 2025, federal workers missed their first full paycheck of the shutdown. By Day 20, approximately 750,000 workers were furloughed daily without pay, while 1.4 million essential workers continued working without paychecks. By October 31, the Congressional Budget Office estimated that the shutdown had caused an estimated $7 billion loss of output from the economy. More than 4,000 federal workers faced permanent layoffs.

Military service members narrowly avoided missing their October 15 paycheck when the Pentagon redirected funds at the last possible moment. However, defense officials made clear they could not repeat this action, meaning the November 1 military payday was at risk. Senate Majority Leader John Thune announced plans to bring legislation for a vote that would pay federal employees and military service members who continued working during the shutdown.

Starting October 20, 2025, all federal courts no longer had funding to sustain full, paid operations, potentially causing delays in criminal trials, civil case backlogs, and furloughs of court staff.

In November 2025, U.S. Transportation Secretary Sean Duffy stated that large-scale flight disruptions were likely if the federal government shutdown continued, and warned that portions of U.S. airspace might need to be temporarily closed due to staffing shortages. Airports throughout the United States faced significant delays and cancellations as a result of heightened absences among air traffic control personnel due to the U.S. government shutdown, as reported by the Federal Aviation Administration (FAA). Over the weekend, from Friday to Sunday, more than 16,700 flights in the United States experienced delays, and 2,282 flights were canceled, according to the report.

===== Legislative impasse =====
On October 20, 2025, the Senate held 11 votes on the same Republican continuing resolution to fund the government through November 21; all failed to achieve the required 60 votes. At the time, The House of Representatives had not held a legislative vote since September 19 (31 days earlier) when Speaker Mike Johnson sent House members home and said they would not return until the Senate passed legislation.

The political standoff centered on disagreements over healthcare provisions. Republicans sought passage of a continuing resolution funding the government at current levels through November 21, with separate negotiations on healthcare issues. Democrats insisted that any funding bill must include an extension of enhanced Affordable Care Act subsidies and reversal of cuts in Medicaid funding, arguing that approximately 20 million Americans would lose health insurance or see premiums increase when ACA subsidies expired on December 31, 2025.

==== 2026 ====
On January 31, 2026, about half of the departments of the federal government shut down after Congress failed to pass appropriations legislation for the 2026 fiscal year. A funding bill was passed by the Senate hours before the deadline, funding DHS for two weeks and other agencies through September, but the House was not able to vote in time. OPM ordered affected agencies to commence shutdown procedures at midnight. The shutdown ended on February 3, 2026, after the House voted to advance the funding bill, and President Donald Trump signed it a few hours later.

On February 14, 2026, a second shutdown occurred, affecting the Department of Homeland Security (DHS).

== State and territorial governments ==
Government shutdowns can also happen at the state and county government levels. Wisconsin and Rhode Island have longstanding provisions for automatic continuing appropriations, and North Carolina and Kansas passed similar legislation in 2016 and 2025.

Year	Start date	End date	Total days	Location	Ref.
1991	July 1	July 17	17	Maine	
1991	July 1	August 23	54	Connecticut	
1991	July 2	August 3	34	Pennsylvania	
1992	July 1	September 1	63	California	
2002	July 1	July 3	3	Tennessee	
2005	July 1	July 9	9	Minnesota	
2006	May 1	May 13	13	Puerto Rico	
2006	July 1	July 8	8	New Jersey	
2007	October 1	October 1	1 (approx. 4 hrs)	Michigan	
2007	July 11	July 12	1 (approx. 6 hrs)	Pennsylvania	
2009	October 1	October 1	1 (approx. 6 hrs)	Michigan	
2011	July 1	July 20	20	Minnesota	
2015	July 1	July 6	6	Illinois	
2017	July 1	July 4	3	New Jersey	
2017	July 1	July 4	4	Maine	

== County governments ==
Year	Start date	End date	Total days	Location	Ref.
2005	Feb 7	Feb 7	1	Erie County, New York	

== See also ==
- Budget crisis – Deadlock blocking the passage of a budget
- Cabinet crisis – Mass resignation, or threat thereof, of top-level government advisers
- Constitutional crisis – Conflict a governing law is unable to resolve
- Deficit spending – Spending in excess of revenue
- Fiscal policy – Use of government revenue collection and expenditure to influence a country's economy
- Generational accounting – Method of measuring the fiscal burdens facing current and future generations
- Gridlock (politics) – Political stalemate
- Lockout – Work stoppage by management of a company
- Loss of supply – Failure of budget legislation in a parliamentary system

=== U.S. ===
- Appropriations bill (United States) – Bill which allocates government spending
- Deficit hawk – Political slang term
- Fiscal policy of the United States
- National debt by U.S. presidential terms
- National debt of the United States – U.S. federal government debt (United States national debt)
- Starve the beast – Political strategy utilized by American conservatives
- Taxation in the United States – Government revenue systems at all levels
- United States federal budget – Budget of the U.S. federal government
