= List of United States federal funding gaps =

Since 1976, when the United States budget process was revised by the Budget Act of 1974, the United States Federal Government has had funding gaps on 27 occasions. Funding gaps did not lead to government shutdowns prior to 1980, when President Jimmy Carter requested opinions from Attorney General Benjamin Civiletti on funding gaps and the Antideficiency Act. Civiletti's first opinion held that all government work must stop if Congress did not agree to pay for it. He later issued a second opinion that allowed essential government services to continue in the absence of a spending bill. Eleven of the funding gaps led to federal government employees being furloughed.

== List ==
Color legend
| Democratic Party | Republican Party |
| Employees furloughed | No furloughs |

| Fiscal year | Year(s) | Date(s) | Total days | Employees furloughed | President | Senate | House | Circumstances |
|---|---|---|---|---|---|---|---|---|
| 1977 | 1976 | Sep 30– Oct 11 | 12 | No | Ford | Dem (61D-37R-2I) | Dem (291D-144R) | Citing out of control spending, President Gerald Ford vetoed a funding bill for the United States Department of Labor and the United States Department of Health, Education, and Welfare (HEW). On October 1, the Democratic-controlled Congress overrode Ford's veto but it took until October 11 for a continuing resolution ending funding gaps for other parts of government to become law. |
| 1978 | 1977 (1) | Sep 30– Oct 13 | 14 | No | Carter | Dem (61D-38R-1I) | Dem (292D-143R) | The Democratic-controlled House continued to uphold the ban on using Medicaid dollars to pay for abortions, except in cases where the life of the mother was at stake. Meanwhile, the Democratic-controlled Senate pressed to loosen the ban to allow abortion funding in the case of rape or incest. A funding gap was created when disagreement over the issue between the houses had become tied to funding for the Departments of Labor and HEW. A temporary agreement was made to restore funding through October 31, 1977, allowing more time for Congress to resolve its dispute. |
| 1978 | 1977 (2) | Oct 31– Nov 9 | 10 | No | Carter | Dem (61D-38R-1I) | Dem (292D-143R) | The earlier temporary funding agreement expired. President Jimmy Carter signed a second funding agreement to allow for more time for negotiation. |
| 1978 | 1977 (3) | Nov 30– Dec 9 | 10 | No | Carter | Dem (61D-38R-1I) | Dem (292D-143R) | The second temporary funding agreement expired. The House held firm against the Senate in its effort to ban Medicaid paying for the abortions of victims of statutory rape. A deal was eventually struck allowing Medicaid to pay for abortions in cases resulting from rape, incest, or in which the mother's health is at risk. |
| 1979 | 1978 | Sep 30– Oct 18 | 19 | No | Carter | Dem (61D-38R-1I) | Dem (292D-143R) | Deeming them wasteful, President Carter vetoed a public works appropriations bill and a Department of Defense bill including funding for a nuclear-powered aircraft carrier. Spending for the Department of HEW was also delayed over additional disputes concerning Medicaid funding for abortion. |
| 1980 | 1979 | Sep 30– Oct 12 | 13 | No | Carter | Dem (58D-41R-1I) | Dem (272D-158R-1I) | Against the opposition of the Senate, the House pushed for a 5.5 percent pay increase for Congress members and senior civil servants. The House also sought to restrict federal spending on abortion only to cases where the mother's life is in danger, while the Senate wanted to maintain funding for abortions in cases of rape and incest. |
| 1980 | 1980 | May 1 | 1 | Yes | Carter | Dem (58D-41R-1I) | Dem (277D-157R-1I) | Affected only the Federal Trade Commission. This was the first time a shutdown of a federal agency was enforced, based on a new interpretation of the 1884 Antideficiency Act. |
| 1982 | 1981 | Nov 20–23 | 3 | No | Reagan | Rep (53R-46D-1I) | Dem (243D-191R-1I) | President Ronald Reagan pledged that he would veto any spending bill that failed to include at least half of the $8.4 billion in domestic budget cuts that he proposed. Although the Republican controlled Senate passed a bill that met his specifications, the Democratic-controlled House insisted on larger cuts to defense than Reagan wanted as well as pay raises for Congress and senior civil servants. A compromise bill fell $2 billion short of the cuts Reagan wanted, so Reagan vetoed the bill and shut down the federal government. A temporary bill restored spending through December 15 and gave Congress the time to work out a more lasting deal. |
| 1982 | 1981 | Nov 23 | 1 | Yes | Reagan | Rep (53R-46D-1I) | Dem (243D-191R-1I) | |
| 1983 | 1982 (1) | Sep 30– Oct 2 | 3 | No | Reagan | Rep (53R-46D-1I) | Dem (243D-191R-1I) | Congress passed the required spending bills a day late. |
| 1983 | 1982 (2) | Dec 17–21 | 5 | No | Reagan | Rep (53R-46D-1I) | Dem (243D-191R-1I) | The House and Senate wished to fund job programs, but President Reagan vowed to veto any such legislation. The House also opposed plans to fund the MX missile. The funding gap ended after Congress abandoned their jobs plan, but Reagan was forced to yield on funding for both the MX and Pershing II missiles. He also accepted funding for the Legal Services Corporation, which he wanted abolished, in exchange for higher foreign aid to Israel. |
| 1984 | 1983 | Nov 10–14 | 5 | No | Reagan | Rep (54R-46D) | Dem (269D-165R-1I) | The House increased education funding but cut defense and foreign aid spending, which led to a dispute with President Reagan. Eventually, the House reduced their proposed education funding, and also accepted funding for the MX missile. However, the foreign aid and defense cuts remained, and oil and gas leasing was banned in federal wildlife refuges. Abortion was also prohibited from being paid for with government employee health insurance. |
| 1985 | 1984 (1) | Sep 30– Oct 3 | 4 | No | Reagan | Rep (54R-46D) | Dem (269D-165R-1I) | The House wished to link the budget to both a crime-fighting package President Reagan supported and a water projects package he did not. The Senate additionally tied the budget to a civil rights measure designed to overturn Grove City v. Bell. Reagan proposed a compromise where he abandoned his crime package in exchange for Congress dropping the water projects package. A deal was not struck, and a three-day spending extension was passed instead. |
| 1985 | 1984 (2) | Oct 3–5 | 3 | Yes | Reagan | Rep (54R-46D) | Dem (269D-165R-1I) | The October 3 spending extension expired, forcing a shutdown. Congress dropped its proposed water and civil rights packages, while President Reagan kept his crime package. Funding for aid to the Nicaraguan Contras was also passed. |
| 1987 | 1986 | Oct 16–18 | 3 | Yes | Reagan | Rep (53R-47D) | Dem (253D-181R-1I) | Disputes over multiple issues between the House and President Reagan and the Republican Senate forced a shutdown. The House dropped many of their demands in exchange for a vote on their welfare package, and a concession of the sale of then-government-owned Conrail. |
| 1988 | 1987 | Dec 18–20 | 3 | No | Reagan | Dem (55D-45R) | Dem (258D-177R) | The House and Senate opposed funding for the Contras and wanted the Federal Communications Commission to renew enforcement of the "Fairness Doctrine". They yielded on the "Fairness Doctrine" issue in exchange for non-lethal aid to the Contras. |
| 1991 | 1990 | Oct 5–9 | 5 | Yes | Bush | Dem (55D-45R) | Dem (260D-175R) | President George H. W. Bush vowed to veto any continuing resolution that was not paired with a deficit reduction package, and did so when one reached his desk. The House failed to override his veto before a shutdown occurred. Congress then passed a continuing resolution with a deficit reduction package to end the shutdown. |
| 1996 | 1995 (1) | Nov 14–19 | 6 | Yes | Clinton | Rep (53R-47D) | Rep (233R-201D-1I) | President Bill Clinton vetoed a continuing resolution passed by the Republican-controlled Congress. A deal was reached allowing for 75-percent funding for four weeks, and Clinton agreed to a seven-year timetable for a balanced budget. |
| 1996 | 1995–96 (2) | Dec 15– Jan 6 | 23 | Yes | Clinton | Rep (53R-47D) | Rep (233R-201D-1I) | The Republicans demanded that President Clinton propose a budget with the seven-year timetable using Congressional Budget Office numbers, rather than Clinton's Office of Management and Budget numbers. However, Clinton refused. Eventually, Congress and Clinton agreed to pass a compromise budget. |
| 2014 | 2013 | Oct 1–17 | 17 | Yes | Obama | Dem (53D-45R-2I) | Rep (234R-201D) | Due to disagreement regarding inclusion of language defunding or delaying the Patient Protection and Affordable Care Act (PPACA), more commonly known as Obamacare, the Government did not pass a substantial funding bill. Funding was agreed to by the President and Congress for active military pay and back wages for furloughed employees. In addition, the House offered very small funding measures for a few, high-profile functions, which the Senate and White House rejected as "game-playing" while the Senate offered bills that did not include language to defund or delay the PPACA, but the House rejected them. On October 16, Senate Democrats and Republicans agreed to a deal that extended funding for government services until January 15, making only minor adjustments to the PPACA and other funding. This resolution was quickly adopted by both houses in bipartisan numbers, and was signed early next morning by President Barack Obama. |
| 2018 | 2018 (1) | Jan 20– 22 | 3 | Yes | Trump | Rep (51R-47D-2I) | Rep (240R-195D) | The Republicans and the Democrats could not agree on the inclusion of immigrant protections for beneficiaries of the Deferred Action for Childhood Arrivals program to the spending bill. The House passed a short-term spending bill. |
| 2018 | 2018 (2) | Feb 9 | 1 | No | Trump | Rep (51R-47D-2I) | Rep (240R-195D) | Senate leaders reached a two-year budget deal. Sen. Rand Paul (R-KY) held up a Senate vote forcing the government to shut down at midnight. The funding gap quickly ended before the start of the work day. |
| 2019 | 2018–19 (3) | Dec 22–Jan 25 | 35 | Yes | Trump | Rep (51R-47D-2I) (Note: Before January 3, 2019) | Rep (238R-197D) | President Donald Trump demanded that any spending bills include funding for a border wall, and an agreement could not be reached. The shutdown began during the meeting of the 115th United States Congress and continued into the meeting of the 116th United States Congress. On January 19, Trump proposed to temporarily extend two programs that protect some unauthorized immigrants from deportation in exchange for funding for the border wall. The first program, Temporary Protected Status, shields around 320,000 people and the second, Deferred Action for Childhood Arrivals (DACA), applies to around 700,000 people who were brought into the country as children. Democrats rejected Trump's proposal. Nancy Pelosi insisted that a pathway to citizenship be given, calling Trump's offer "unacceptable" and a "non-starter". On January 25, Trump and the Congress agreed to a short-term spending bill that would fund the federal government until February 15. |
| 2019 | 2018–19 (3) | Dec 22–Jan 25 | 35 | Yes | Trump | Rep (53R-45D-2I) (Note: From January 3, 2019 onwards) | Dem (235D-200R) | |
| 2021 | 2020 (1) | Oct 1 | 1 | No | Trump | Rep (53R-45D-2I) | Dem (235D-198R-2I) | A continuing resolution lasting until December 11, 2020 was passed by the House on September 29 and the Senate on September 30. However, the bill was not signed by President Trump until shortly after the midnight deadline, as he was returning from a campaign rally in Duluth, Minnesota late at night, causing a short funding gap of less than an hour. Shutdown procedures were not activated. |
| 2021 | 2020 (2) | Dec 22 | 1 | No | Trump | Rep (52R-46D-2I) | Dem (235D-198R-2I) | A continuing resolution lasting until December 28, 2020 was passed by the House and the Senate on December 21, but Trump did not sign the bill until early on December 22, causing a brief funding gap. Shutdown procedures were not activated. |
| 2024 | 2024 (1) | Mar 23 | 1 | No | Biden | Dem (48D-49R-3I) | Rep (218R-213D) | Budget negotiations for the 2024 fiscal year were fraught, with the federal government operating on continuing resolutions for nearly half the year. An omnibus spending bill containing some of the required appropriations bills was passed on March 8, but disagreements over border policy and foreign aid were obstacles for the second omnibus that contained the remaining appropriations bills. The last continuing resolution had extended government funding through March 22; however, the omnibus passed the Senate in the early hours of March 23, and President Biden signed it later that day, causing a funding gap for part of the day on March 23. Partial government shutdown procedures were not activated. |
| 2025 | 2024 (2) | Dec 21 | 1 | No | Biden | Dem (47D-49R-4I) | Rep (219R-211D) | Budget negotiations for the 2025 fiscal year saw the federal government operating on continuing resolutions. An initial bipartisan proposal was withdrawn following criticism from Elon Musk and former President Donald Trump. A second proposal by Republicans would also fail to pass due to opposition from both Republicans and Democrats, who rejected Trump's proposal to either suspend the debt ceiling until January 2029 or completely eliminate the ceiling. A third proposal, which saw the removal of the debt measure, would later pass in the House. The last continuing resolution had extended government funding through December 20; however, the new continuing resolution passed the Senate in the early hours of December 21, and President Biden signed it later that day, causing a funding gap for part of the day on December 21. Partial government shutdown procedures were not activated. |
| 2026 | 2025 | Oct 1–Nov 12 | 43 | Yes | Trump | Rep (53R-45D-2I) | Rep (219R-214D) | A Republican-proposed continuing resolution (H.R. 5371) to fund the government until November 21, 2025 passed the House on September 19, but failed to advance in the Senate on the same day; it was rejected again on September 30, October 1, 3, 6, 8, 9, 14, 15, 16, 20, 22, and 28, and November 4. A competing Democratic-proposed CR (S. 2882) to fund the government through October 31 was rejected in the Senate on September 19 and 30 and October 1, 3, 6, 8, and 9, and is no longer being considered. On November 5, it surpassed the 2018–19 shutdown, becoming the longest in U.S. history. |
| 2026 | 2026 (1) | January 31–February 3 | 4 | Yes | Trump | Rep (53R-45D-2I) | Rep (218R-213D) | |
| 2026 | 2026 (2) | February 14–April 30 | 76 | Yes | Trump | Rep (53R-45D-2I) | Rep (218R-213D) | Affected only the Department of Homeland Security. |

=== Presidential summary ===
| # | President | Total funding gaps | Total days | Total days furloughed |
|---|---|---|---|---|
| 38 | Gerald Ford | 1 | 12 | 0 |
| 39 | Jimmy Carter | 6 | 67 | 1 |
| 40 | Ronald Reagan | 8 | 30 | 7 |
| 41 | George H. W. Bush | 1 | 5 | 5 |
| 42 | Bill Clinton | 2 | 29 | 29 |
| 43 | George W. Bush | 0 | 0 | 0 |
| 44 | Barack Obama | 1 | 17 | 17 |
| 45 | Donald Trump | 5 | 41 | 38 |
| 46 | Joe Biden | 2 | 2 | 0 |
| 47 | Donald Trump | 3 | 123 | 123 |
| | Donald Trump Cumulative | 8 | 164 | 161 |
