= 2018 United States federal government shutdown =

2018 United States federal government shutdown may refer to:

- The January 2018 United States federal government shutdown, from Saturday, January 20 to Monday, January 22
- The 2018–2019 United States federal government shutdown, from December 22, 2018, until January 25, 2019
