= Budget crisis =

Deadlock blocking the passage of a budget

A budget crisis is a situation in which the legislative and the executive in a presidential system deadlock and are unable to pass a budget. In presidential systems, the legislature has the power to pass a budget, but the executive often has a veto in which there are insufficient votes in the legislature to override. If no emergency provisions are made for the government's budget, a budget crisis may develop into a government shutdown in which the government temporarily suspends non-essential services until a budget is passed.

Unlike parliamentary systems, where a loss of supply would trigger the immediate fall of the government, a budget crisis can often lead to an extended stand-off. At the federal level in the United States, a crisis can often be averted by a continuing resolution which appropriates funding at the same level as the previous budget.

A budget crisis can also occur if the legislative branch has a constitutionally mandated dissolution or suspension date and the budget hasn't been passed up to that point [or due to disagreement between the two parties controlling the legislative branch]. The term "budget crisis" could be used for situation where the executive branch freezes certain funds (impoundment) despite the directions of the law on annual budget already passed by parliament.

Politically, a budget crisis may develop in a situation of disagreement between state and civil society. Constitutional economics is a field of economics and constitutionalism which describes and analyzes the specific interrelationships between constitutional issues and the functioning of the economy, including budget process. The standards of constitutional economics when used during annual budget planning, as well as the latter's transparency to society, are of primary guiding importance to the implementation of the rule of law. Also, the availability of an effective court system, to be used by the civil society in situations of unfair government spending and executive impoundment of any previously authorized appropriations, becomes a key element for the success of any influential civil society.

== Examples ==
=== United States federal government shutdown of 1995 and 1996 ===
A particularly severe budget crisis occurred in the United States in November 1995, when the House of Representatives under Speaker Newt Gingrich and the administration of President Bill Clinton quarrelled over apportionments. The failure of the House and Clinton to pass a continuing budget resolution to apportion temporary funds forced a closure of most non-essential United States government offices for several weeks.

=== United States federal government shutdown of 2013 ===
History repeated for the United States in 2013. Under then president, Barack Obama. The Republican-controlled House of Representatives boycotted the budget to protest the Affordable Care Act. The failure of the House to pass a continuing budget resolution forced a closure of most non-essential United States government offices for several weeks in October 2013.

== Uses in popular culture ==
In the episode "Shutdown" of The West Wing, a budget crisis situation like the 1995-1996 federal government shutdown was depicted when Josiah Bartlet and Republican Speaker of the House Haffley disagree over budget cuts and shuts down the government for a number of days.

== See also ==
- Fiscal gap
- Political economy
- Cabinet crisis
- Constitutional economics
- Constitutional crisis
- Gridlock (politics)
- Government shutdowns in the United States
