= 1980 United States federal government shutdown =

1st US Federal government shutdown

The United States federal government shut down for the first time on May 1, 1980, for one day and affected only the Federal Trade Commission (FTC). Congress had allowed its funding to lapse as part of an effort to pass an authorization bill that would limit the FTC's powers, but the Carter Administration for the first time enforced a shutdown of a federal agency based on a new interpretation of the 1884 Antideficiency Act, causing new funding to be approved that evening. The shutdown caused the furlough of 1,600 employees and cost the government $700,000 (equal to $2.2 million in 2024), mostly as a result of lost labor.

== Background ==
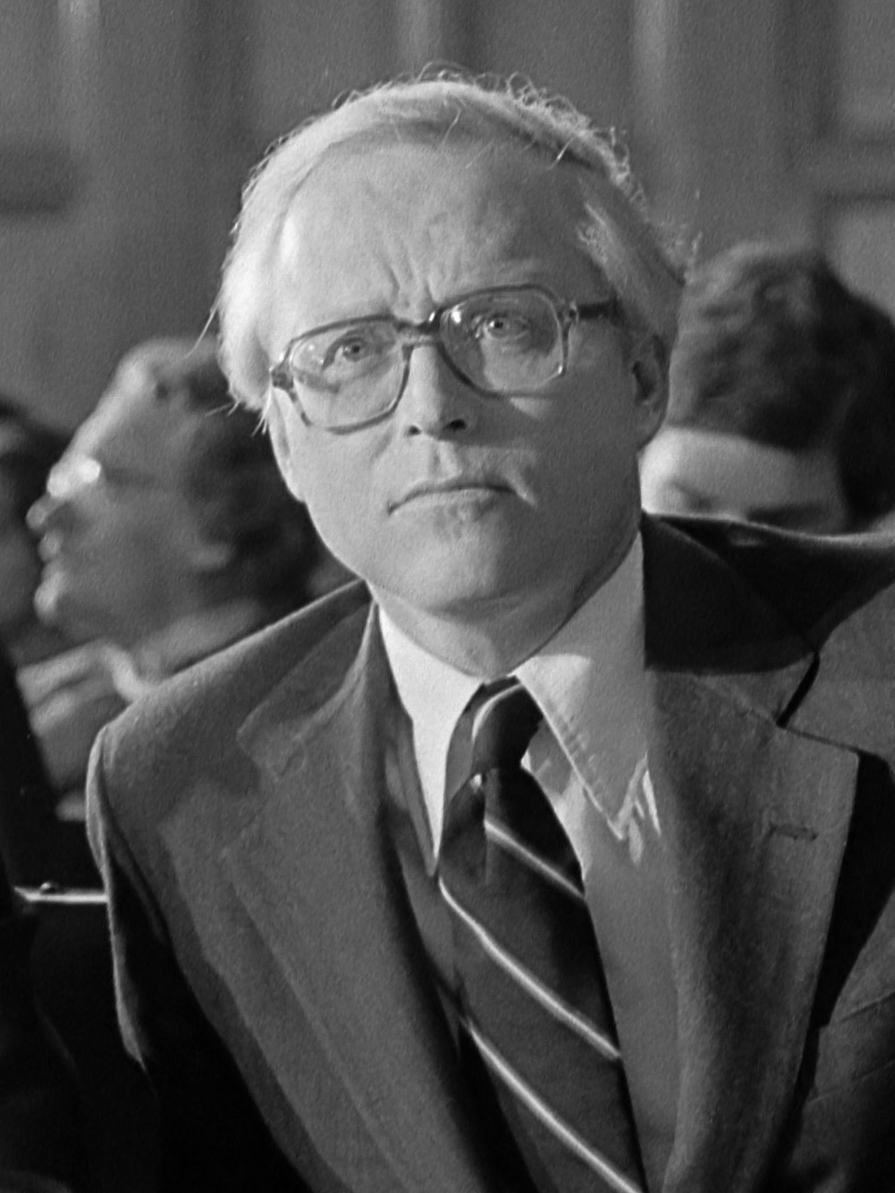
Attorney General Benjamin Civiletti issued an opinion on April 25, 1980, stating that the 1884 Antideficiency Act required agencies to shut down during a funding gap. Five days later, on May 1, this opinion was used to shut down the Federal Trade Commission when Congress allowed its funding to lapse.

Prior to 1980, federal funding gaps caused by the expiration of appropriations legislation did not lead to government shutdowns. This was technically noncompliant with the Antideficiency Act, a law passed in 1884 that made it illegal to expend government funds without a Congressional appropriation under most circumstances, because it was believed that Congress did not intend the cessation of government services under these circumstances.

Over the course of the 1970s, there were many funding lapses often caused by tangential issues. In the course of legislative research, a staffer for Representative Gladys Spellman came across the Antideficiency Act provisions, and Spellman contacted Comptroller General Elmer Staats for an opinion. Staats responded that "we do not believe that the Congress intends that federal agencies be closed during periods of expired appropriations". However, Attorney General Benjamin Civiletti overruled this on April 25, 1980, issuing an opinion that the Antideficiency Act did require agencies to shut down during a funding gap.

== Shutdown ==
On May 1, 1980, five days after the Civiletti opinion was issued, funding for the Federal Trade Commission (FTC) expired, causing the first ever shutdown of a government agency due to a lapse in appropriations. The FTC was at the time being funded through its own appropriations legislation, and the shutdown did not affect any other agencies. Congressional members had delayed the funding extension, seeking to first pass an authorization bill that would limit the investigatory and rule-making powers of the FTC, which they, and businesses, had criticized for its aggressive monitoring of economic activity. They were surprised that a shutdown was actually enforced.

A total of 1,600 workers were furloughed, and meetings and court dates were canceled. U.S. Marshals were dispatched to at least two FTC field offices to ensure that the facilities shut down. Confidential documents were turned over to federal security personnel to be put into storage, as it was believed that the agency might be without funding for a significant period of time; packing and unpacking of these documents added significantly to the expense of the shutdown.

The shutdown ended that evening, with the House approving an extension of funding 284–96, and the Senate 71–10. The shutdown was estimated to cost $700,000, of which $600,000 was for salaries. The shutdown occurred with the same party controlling the presidency and both houses of Congress, a situation that would not be repeated until the 2018 shutdown, and marks the only time this occurred under Democrats.

== Aftermath ==
Carter threatened to shut down the entire government if Congress did not pass appropriations legislation by the beginning of the next fiscal year on October 1, 1980, but this did not come to pass. Civiletti issued a revised opinion on January 18, 1981, that softened some aspects of the shutdown, allowing work that protects human safety or property to continue. A widespread government shutdown affecting more than one agency did occur for the first time during the Reagan administration, on November 23, 1981.
