= 2021 United States federal budget =

2021 Budget of the United States federal government
- Submitted by: Donald Trump
- Submitted to: 116th Congress
- Country: United States
- Total revenue: $4.046 trillion (actual); 18.1% of GDP
- Total expenditures: $6.818 trillion (actual); 30.5% of GDP
- Deficit: $2.772 trillion (actual); 12.4% of GDP
- Website: BUDGET OF THE U.S. GOVERNMENT

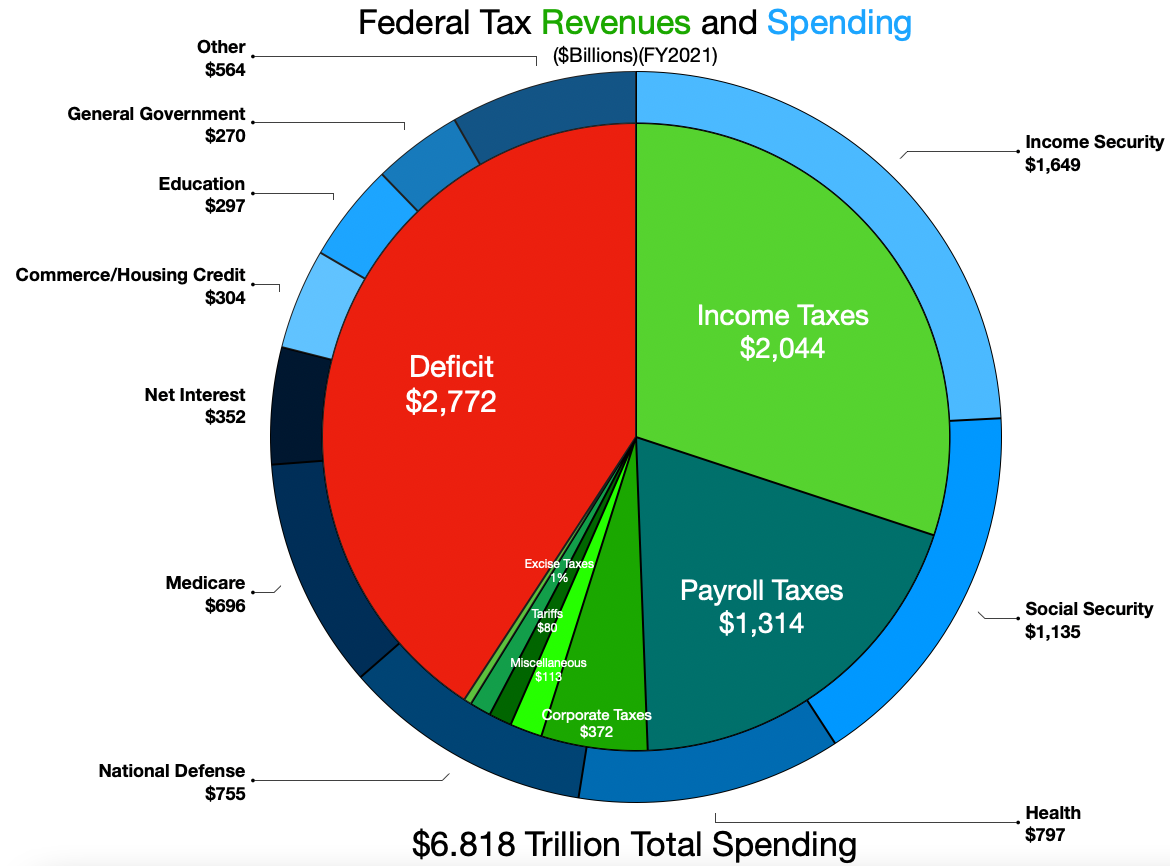
Federal Revenue and Spending

The United States federal budget for fiscal year 2021 ran from October 1, 2020 to September 30, 2021. The government was initially funded through a series of five temporary continuing resolutions. The final funding package was passed as a consolidated spending bill on December 27, 2020, the Consolidated Appropriations Act, 2021. The American Rescue Plan Act of 2021 was passed as the budget reconciliation bill for FY2021.

== Budget proposal ==
The FY2021 budget is subject to the spending caps of the Budget Control Act of 2011, as modified by the Bipartisan Budget Act of 2019.

The Trump administration budget proposal was released in February 2020.

== Appropriations legislation ==
The drafting of appropriations bills was delayed due to the COVID-19 pandemic. The House began consideration of appropriations bills on July 6. As of July 22, the House had completed markup of all 12 bills, while the Senate had yet to begin. The House passed the first consolidated appropriations bill (H.R. 7608) containing four of the 12 bills on July 24. The House passed the second consolidated appropriations bill (H.R. 7617) containing an additional six bills on July 31. The remaining two bills for Homeland Security and the Legislative Branch were not expected to be voted upon soon after.

A continuing resolution lasting until December 11, 2020 was passed by the House on September 29, and by the Senate on September 30. However, the bill was not signed by President Trump until shortly after the midnight deadline, as he was returning from a campaign rally in Duluth, Minnesota late at night, causing a short funding gap of less than an hour.

The Senate released drafts of its appropriations legislation on November 10, 2020, starting the legislative process in that house and allowing negotiations to begin.

A series of four short-term continuing resolutions were passed during the final stages of negotiation on an omnibus appropriations bill which included supplementary relief funding for the COVID-19 pandemic. The first extended funding for one week through December 18, 2020, the second extended it by another two days through December 20, a third by one day through December 21, and a final one by seven days until December 28. The final bill is the Consolidated Appropriations Act, 2021.

== Reconciliation legislation ==
A budget resolution for the 2021 fiscal year began to be considered by the 117th United States Congress in February 2021. As appropriations for the fiscal year had already been approved, the budget resolution's main purpose was to begin the budget reconciliation process to allow a COVID-19 pandemic relief bill to be passed without the possibility of being blocked by a filibuster. The American Rescue Plan Act of 2021 was signed on March 11, 2021.
