= 1992 California budget crisis =

Crisis leading to the shutdown of the California government

The 1992 California budget crisis began on July 1, 1992, when the California State Legislature and Governor Pete Wilson failed to pass a budget by the constitutional deadline, and ended 63 days later. The state government ran out of cash reserves on July 2 and began paying employees and contractors with IOUs, which major banks agreed to honor for the time being. After a period of negotiation, the legislature and governor agreed on an austere $54.7 billion budget which reduced entitlement payments and public services. Nonetheless this budget left behind a cash reserve of only $435 million, prompting experts to warn about the possible need for further austerity and criticize the deal failing to address the structural problems of the state, such as the effect of Proposition 13 on limiting the government's ability to raise property taxes.
