= January 2018 United States federal government shutdown =

- Date: January 20–22, 2018 (3 days)

The United States federal government shut down at midnight EST on Saturday, January 20, 2018, until the evening of Monday, January 22. It began after a failure to pass legislation to fund government operations and agencies. This stemmed from disputes over the extension of status of persons affected by the Deferred Action for Childhood Arrivals (DACA) immigration policy, and therefore whether those covered under the program should face deportation. There was also a dispute over whether funding should be allocated towards building a Mexico–United States border wall. According to estimates by The New York Times, 692,900 workers were furloughed during the shutdown. It was the first government shutdown under Republican leadership in the White House, House of Representatives, and U.S. Senate.

== Background ==
The U.S. government's 2018 fiscal year began on October 1, 2017. Because regular appropriations bills to fund the government had not been passed, Congress funded the government through a series of three temporary continuing resolutions (CRs). These extended government funding respectively through December 8, 2017, December 22, 2017, and January 19, 2018.

The negotiations on a permanent appropriations bill had become entangled with disputes over the Deferred Action for Childhood Arrivals (DACA) immigration policy. DACA is a U.S. immigration policy that allowed some individuals who entered the country as minors, and had either entered or remained in the country illegally, to receive a renewable two-year period of deferred action from deportation and to be eligible for a work permit. As of 2017, approximately 800,000 individuals were enrolled in the program created by DACA. The policy was established by the Obama administration through executive action in June 2012 in response to Congress' failure to pass the DREAM Act. The Trump administration rescinded DACA in September 2017, setting an expiration date of March 2018, with the stated preference that Congress adopt a legislative solution.

CR number	Date CR passed	Expiration date (duration)	Remarks
1	October 1, 2017	December 9, 2017 (c. 10 weeks)	
2	December 9, 2017	December 22, 2017 (3 weeks)	
3	December 22, 2017	January 19, 2018 (4 weeks)	Resulted in 69-hour shutdown
4	January 22, 2018	February 8, 2018 (c. 2 weeks)	Resulted in 9-hour funding lapse
5	February 9, 2018	March 23, 2018 (c. 6 weeks)	

== Legislative history ==
The first 2018 shutdown began when the Senate failed to overcome a Democratic filibuster of a temporary continuing resolution (an appropriations bill), which requires a 3/5 supermajority to end. The shutdown began on the first anniversary of Donald Trump taking office. The shutdown ended when Senate Democrats agreed to end the filibuster and invoke cloture with the Republican promise that they would allow debate on the DREAM Act before the continuing resolution would expire on February 8, 2018. Some liberals have criticized the Democrats decision to end the shutdown without a firm assurance and no guarantee on DACA. President Donald Trump hailed it as a "big win" and said that the Democrats caved in.

External videos
- Senate Cloture Vote Tally on CR: 50–49, January 19, 2018, C-SPAN

As of January 19, 2018, the Extension of Continuing Appropriations Act, 2018 (H.R. 195) was under consideration to extend funding through February 16, 2018. The bill passed the House on January 18, but a cloture vote in the Senate failed 50–49, with 60 votes required to end a Democratic-led filibuster, at around 10:45 pm EST, shortly before the midnight expiration of the previous continuing resolution. Forty-five Republicans were joined by five Democrats in voting yes to the cloture motion on the resolution, while four Republicans voted against cloture. This continuing resolution, supported by Republican leadership, included a six-year authorization for the Children's Health Insurance Program (CHIP), which had not been funded since October, and delayed several healthcare taxes stemming from the Affordable Care Act. Democrats preferred a shorter resolution lasting a few days, intending for negotiations to incorporate an extension of the DACA policy.

Senate vote on cloture (60 votes needed to pass; January 19, 2018)
Party	Votes for	Votes against	Not voting/Absent
Republican (51)	45	5: Jeff Flake; Lindsey Graham; Mike Lee; Mitch McConnell; Rand Paul	1: John McCain
Democratic (47)	5: Joe Donnelly; Heidi Heitkamp; Doug Jones; Joe Manchin; Claire McCaskill	42	–
Independent (2)	–	2: Angus King; Bernie Sanders	–
Total (100)	50	49	1

As the January 2018 shutdown began, Democratic Senator Claire McCaskill proposed a bill that would ensure the military would continue being paid and receive death benefits during the shutdown; such a continuing resolution had been passed unanimously during the 2013 shutdown. Republican Senate Majority Leader Mitch McConnell objected to the measure, wanting to "restore funding for the entire government before this becomes necessary". This resulted in the bill's failure. In proposing the bill, McCaskill had noted that Trump had blamed Democrats if the military were to go unpaid during the shutdown. McConnell himself had also accused Democrats of keeping "the government shuttered for American troops, American veterans, American military families". One day after this bill failed, Vice President Mike Pence told American troops in Syria that "a minority in the Senate has decided to play politics with military pay". Meanwhile, the White House answering machine told callers that Democrats in Congress are holding "government funding - including funding for our troops ... hostage".

On January 20, McConnell called for a vote at 1 a.m. EST on January 22 for a bill that would keep the government open through February 8, and was not likely to include concessions Democrats were seeking on immigration. On the night of January 21, McConnell moved to delay the procedural vote on a temporary spending bill, scheduling it to take place at noon EST on January 22. A temporary spending bill until February 8 passed by a large majority by the end of the day.

The solution was brokered by a bipartisan group of around 20 senators, who started meeting as negotiations stalled and pledged to advance various stalled issues in the following weeks.

On the afternoon of January 22, a deal was announced to reopen the government the following day. The Senate voted 81–18 to end debate and proceed to approving new temporary funding. The House passed the bill, and the President signed it that evening.

Senate vote on cloture (60 votes needed to pass; January 22, 2018)
Party	Votes for	Votes against	Not voting/Absent
Republican (51)	48	2: Mike Lee; Rand Paul	1: John McCain
Democratic (47)	32	15: Richard Blumenthal; Cory Booker; Catherine Cortez Masto; Dianne Feinstein; Kirsten Gillibrand; Kamala Harris; Mazie Hirono; Patrick Leahy; Ed Markey; Bob Menendez; Jeff Merkley; Chris Murphy; Jon Tester; Elizabeth Warren; Ron Wyden	–
Independent (2)	1: Angus King	1: Bernie Sanders	–
Total (100)	81	18	1

== Effects ==
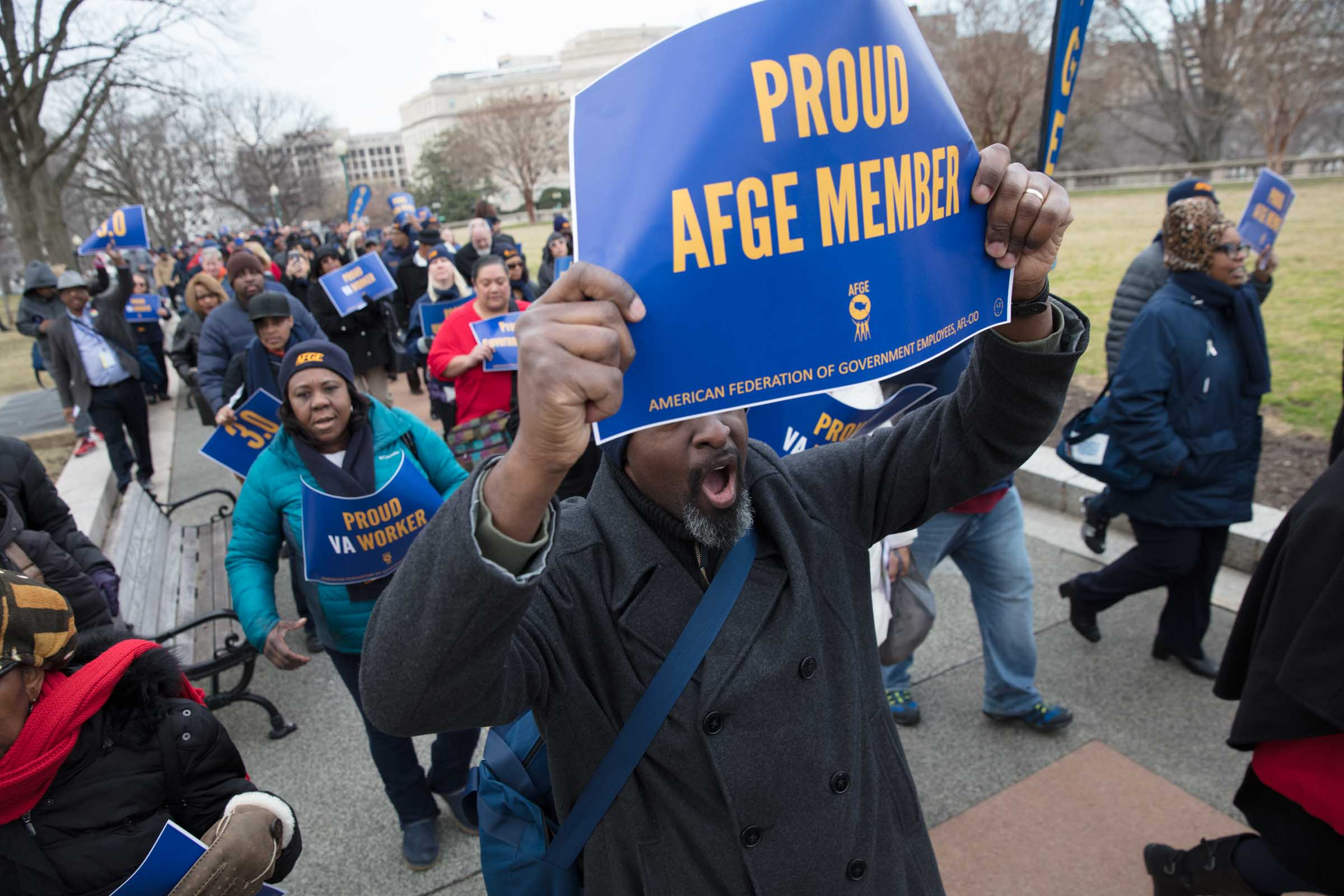
AFGE members protesting for the federal employees affected by the shutdown

The Trump administration announced its intention to minimize the impact of the January 2018 shutdown. National Park Service (NPS) facilities generally remained open, although staff were still furloughed and some areas of parks were closed due to lack of staff. On the first day of the shutdown, it was estimated that about a third of NPS's 417 sites were completely closed, including historical and cultural sites mainly consisting of buildings. The Statue of Liberty and Liberty Bell were among the sites closed; however, the Statue of Liberty was open again on January 22 as New York State provided a temporary funding for the federal employees to operate it. National monuments in Washington, D.C., remained open as well.

Some agencies stayed open by using unspent funds from sources other than annual appropriations, or using fee revenue. The United States Patent and Trademark Office (USPTO) remained open during the shut down because it had access to fees already collected in prior years, the Environmental Protection Agency (EPA) announced that it could stay open for a week, and workers from the Department of Energy (DOE) and Department of State (DOS) were told to report to work on Monday.

Unlike in previous shutdowns, the local government in Washington, D.C., continued operating through the shutdown, due to a provision enacted in the previous year's appropriations legislation, the Consolidated Appropriations Act, 2017.

Due to their status as federal service academies, the United States Air Force Academy (USAFA) and the United States Merchant Marine Academy (USMMA) canceled all of their collegiate athletic events until further notice; the United States Coast Guard Academy (USCGA), United States Naval Academy (USNA, a.k.a. Navy), and United States Military Academy (USMA, a.k.a. Army) were not forced to cancel or reschedule games due to how their athletic programs are organized and funded.

The Department of Defense said that the American Forces Network (AFN) would not be operating during the government shutdown. However, AFN broadcast NFL playoff games on January 21 after two channels—for news and sports—remained on.

== Reactions ==
=== Politicians ===
On January 19, Trump tweeted, "Not looking good for our great Military or Safety & Security on the very dangerous Southern Border. Dems want a Shutdown in order to help diminish the great success of the Tax Cuts, and what they are doing for our booming economy."

In a statement, the White House blamed the shutdown on Senate Democrats and said that it would not negotiate with the Democrats on immigration. The President's planned trip to Mar-a-Lago in Florida was postponed hours prior to the shutdown.

Referencing his meeting with Trump, Senate Minority Leader Chuck Schumer said in a statement, "We discussed all of the major outstanding issues, we made some progress, but we still have a good number of disagreements. The discussions will continue."

As the deadline for the 2018 funding approached, commentators pointed out Donald Trump's previous statements regarding shutdowns. In May 2017, Trump said that "our country needs a 'good shutdown'". Back in 2013 during the Obama presidency, Trump, when asked who should be "fired" if there is a government shut down answered, "if you say who gets fired it always has to be the top (...) problems start from the top and they have to get solved from the top and the president’s the leader (...) when they talk about the government shutdown, they’re going to be talking about the president of the United States, who the president was at that time", and that in a shutdown, "the pressure" was on the president.

On January 21, Trump tweeted, "If stalemate continues, Republicans should go to 51% (Nuclear Option) and vote on real, long term budget, no C.R.'s!" However, a representative for McConnell said the majority leader was opposed to using the nuclear option. Republican Senator Susan Collins said that a group of more than twenty moderates will present ideas for resolving the shutdown of the federal government to the Senate's leadership.

In a speech to US servicemembers at a military facility near the Jordan–Syria border, Vice President Mike Pence said that immigration talks between lawmakers and the White House couldn't proceed until the government reopens. Republican Senator Lindsey Graham criticized White House policy advisor Stephen Miller, saying negotiations were going nowhere as long as he was in charge of negotiating immigration.

On February 6, 2018, as Congress continued to prepare another continuing resolution for a temporary budget, President Trump declared that if American immigration laws were not tightened, "We'll do a shutdown and it's worth it for our country. I'd love to see a shutdown if we don't get this stuff taken care of."

=== Social media ===
During the January 2018 shutdown, Democratic and Republican officials offered up competing narratives over where to lay blame for the Senate's inability to strike an agreement on government funding, creating the competing #TrumpShutdown and #SchumerShutdown hashtags. Trump used the hashtag #DemocratShutdown to counter #TrumpShutdown. By the afternoon of January 20, #TrumpShutdown had been used some 2.6 million times on Twitter, Facebook, and Instagram; while the hashtag #SchumerShutdown was mentioned 1.3 million times during the same period. Other existing hashtags, such as #GOPShutdown and #DemShutdown, were mentioned 236,000 and 107,000 times respectively. The Alliance for Securing Democracy said the hashtag #SchumerShutdown was the top trending hashtag being promoted by Russian bots and trolls on Twitter on the night of January 21.

=== Public opinion ===
In surveys regarding US government shutdowns, Republicans have generally received more blame than Democrats, though a substantial portion of survey respondents said they weren't sure.

In a CNN poll conducted January 14–18, 56 percent of respondents said avoiding a shutdown was more important than continuing DACA as opposed to 34 percent who said the opposite. In another poll conducted by Politico and Morning Consult January 18–19, voters were equally divided on whether it was worth it to shut down the government to pass a bill that allows those eligible for DACA to stay in the US. On other issues, 27 percent said it was worth it to shut down the government for border wall funding, 55 percent for increased defense funding, and 64 percent for renewing CHIP. In an NBC News and SurveyMonkey poll conducted between January 20–22, 60 percent of respondents said Trump did not show strong leadership during the shutdown and 66 percent said they supported DACA.

People responsible for the government shutdown
Poll source	Fieldwork	Trump	Congress		All	Ref.
Poll source	Fieldwork	Trump	Republicans	Democrats	All	Ref.
Fox News	January 21–23, 2018	13%	24%	32%	24%	
YouGov	January 21–23, 2018	33%	13%	37%	—	
NBC News/SurveyMonkey	January 20–22, 2018	38%	18%	39%	—	
Politico/Morning Consult	January 20–21, 2018	34%	15%	35%	—	
Public Policy Polling	January 20–21, 2018	52%		43%	—	
Quinnipiac University	January 19–23, 2018	31%	18%	32%	—	
Government shutdown begins on January 20
Politico/Morning Consult	January 18–19, 2018	—	41%	36%	—	
The Washington Post/ABC News	January 15–18, 2018	48%		28%	18%	
CNN	January 14–18, 2018	21%	26%	31%	10%	
Quinnipiac University	January 12–16, 2018	21%	32%	34%	—	

== Aftermath ==
=== February funding gap ===
A related funding gap occurred during the first 9 hours of Friday, February 9, 2018, EST. The funding gap was widely referred to in media reports as a second shutdown, although no workers were furloughed and government services were not disrupted because the funding gap occurred overnight and was resolved close to the beginning of the workday.

As the continuing resolution (CR) from January 22 expired, the Senate debated a bill, the Bipartisan Budget Act of 2018, that included (among other things) two-year appropriations for the military, a 6-week CR extension for funding the rest of government, and a raising of the debt ceiling. Senator Rand Paul repeatedly objected to the cost of passing of this trillion-dollar legislation, and at approximately 11 p.m. EST on February 8, the Senate recessed until 12:01 a.m. EST, effectively triggering a shutdown. Overnight, the Senate passed the bill that Paul had objected to, and President Trump signed the bill around 9 a.m. EST on February 9.

At midnight, the Office of Management and Budget issued an order to close nonessential government operations and for federal employees to report to work Friday to implement their contingency plans. At around 1 a.m. EST, the Senate used rules that allowed them to bypass Paul, and the CR passed the Senate 71–28. After 5 a.m. EST, the House passed the bill 240–186 with bipartisan support and bipartisan opposition. President Trump signed the bill around 9 a.m. EST on February 9, ending the lapse.

=== Final funding bill passed ===
On the evening of March 21, 2018, the text of the Consolidated Appropriations Act, 2018 was released, with Congress expecting to approve it within two days. On March 23, 2018, the House passed the legislation in a 256–167 vote and the Senate with 65–32. President Trump signed it into law on the same day.

== See also ==
- Government shutdowns in the United States
- List of United States federal funding gaps
