= Loss of supply =

Failure of budget legislation in a parliamentary system

Loss of supply occurs where a government in a parliamentary democracy using the Westminster System or a system derived from it is denied a supply of treasury or exchequer funds, by whichever house or houses of parliament or head of state is constitutionally entitled to grant and deny supply. A defeat on a budgetary vote is one way by which supply can be denied. Loss of supply is typically interpreted as indicating a loss of confidence in the government. Not all money bills are necessarily supply bills. For instance, in Australia, supply bills are defined as "bills which are required by the Government to carry on its day-to-day business".

When a loss of supply occurs, a prime minister is generally required either by constitutional convention or by explicit constitutional instruction to either resign immediately or seek a parliamentary dissolution.

Some constitutions, however, do not allow the option of parliamentary dissolution but rather require the government to be dissolved or to resign.

A similar deadlock can occur within a presidential system, where it is also known as a budget crisis. In contrast to parliamentary systems, the failure of the legislature to authorize spending may not in all circumstances result in an election, because some such legislatures enjoy fixed terms and so cannot be dissolved before a date of termination, which can result in a prolonged crisis.

A deadlock between a head of state and the legislative body can give rise and cause for a head of state to prematurely dismiss the elected government, requiring it to seek re-election. If a government maintains the support of a majority of legislators or the elected parliamentary representatives, the blocking of supply by a head of state would be seen as an abuse of authority and power. Many western countries have removed or restricted the right of a head of state to block supply or veto a government budget unless there is overwhelming justification and cause for such action.

== Examples of the threat or loss of supply ==
- In 1909, the UK House of Lords voted against the "People's Budget", precipitating two general elections and the Parliament Act 1911, which limited the power of the (then mostly hereditary) Lords, in particular preventing them from blocking money bills for more than a month.
- In the 1975 Australian constitutional crisis, the elected Senate delayed voting on a bill to authorize supply for the government demanding that the Prime Minister, Gough Whitlam, call an election for the House of Representatives. Whitlam was dismissed by the Governor-General, Sir John Kerr, on the basis of his refusal to either resign or request a dissolution.
- In December 1979 in Canada, the Progressive Conservative government of Joe Clark was defeated on a budget vote. Clark called the 1980 Canadian federal election as a result. Pierre Trudeau and the Liberals won a majority of seats in the House of Commons of Canada. Clark resigned as prime minister and was replaced by Trudeau.
- In September 1980, the Italian Chamber of Deputies rejected a budget bill proposed by the second Cossiga government in a 298–297 vote taken by secret ballot. Francesco Cossiga consequently resigned as prime minister and was replaced by Arnaldo Forlani.
- Garret FitzGerald's government was defeated in a budget vote in Dáil Éireann in the Republic of Ireland in 1982. FitzGerald immediately sought and was granted a Dáil dissolution.
- On 9 March 2011, the Legislative Council of Hong Kong blocked a resolution for provisional appropriations, which, before 2011, had always been a formality. Resolutions for provisional appropriations had never been voted by division until 2011. The government decided, on the following day, to table another resolution with a minor change being made merely for the sake of circumventing procedural requirements that a negatived question cannot be tabled again.
- On 10 December 2012, the Maltese Parliament rejected the budget bill for the 2013 fiscal year in a 35–34 vote taken by rising vote. Prime Minister Lawrence Gonzi consequently advised the President to dissolve Parliament and called elections for 9 March of the following year.
- On 13 February 2019, the Spanish Government lost a vote on a budget bill 191–158, thanks to two allies of the Government, Republican Left of Catalonia and the Catalan European Democratic Party, siding against it. A snap election was immediately called, which eventually led to a new election of a second Sánchez Government. Both of those parties eventually sided with the new Government to pass the 2021 Budget. The snap election was not automatic, it was a political decision. Budgets were not passed for 2024 and 2025, but the prime minister did not call for snap elections. Instead, the previous year's budget is extended.
