= 2026 United States federal government shutdowns =

2026 U.S. federal government shutdowns
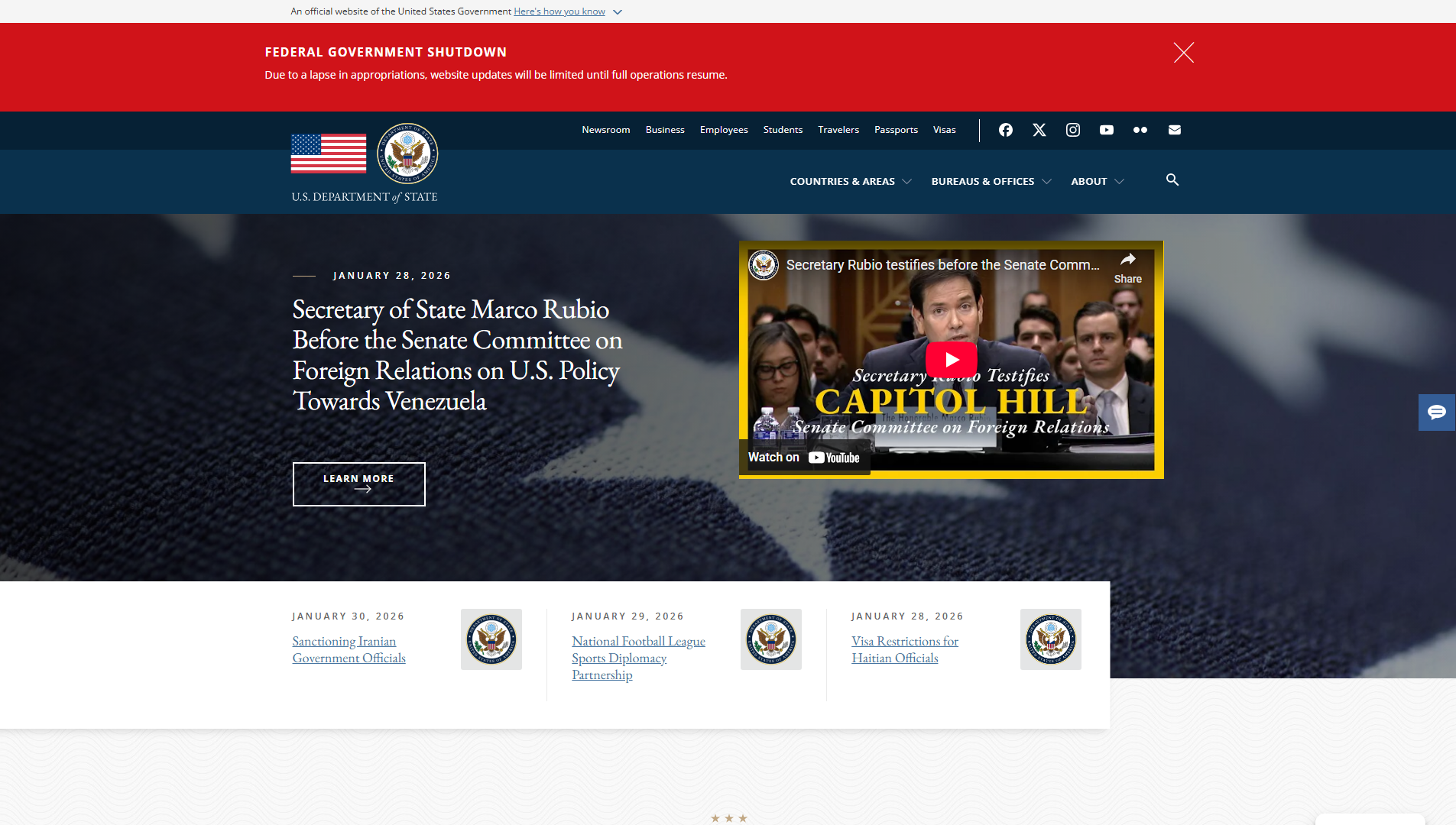
- Website of the United States Department of State during the first shutdown
- Date: First shutdown: January 31 – February 3, 2026 (4 days) Second shutdown: February 14 – April 30, 2026 (76 days)
- Cause: End of certain appropriations from the Continuing Appropriations, Agriculture, Legislative Branch, Military Construction and Veterans Affairs, and Extensions Act, 2026

Two shutdowns of the U.S. federal government occurred in 2026, both stemming from congressional disputes over federal immigration enforcement reforms following the killing of Alex Pretti by Customs and Border Protection (CBP) agents. The first shutdown lasted four days from January 31 to February 3, affecting about half of all federal departments; it resulted from delays in a funding package intended to provide time for reform negotiations. The second shutdown, which lasted from February 14 to April 30, was caused by a stalemate in those negotiations and was limited to the Department of Homeland Security (DHS).

On January 22, 2026, the House passed a package containing the final six of twelve annual appropriations bills. After CBP agents killed Alex Pretti two days later, Senate Democrats withdrew support for the DHS bill, which includes funding for CBP, favoring a continuing resolution to facilitate further negotiations. On January 29, negotiators reached an agreement to pass five of the bills alongside a two-week continuing resolution for DHS. While the Senate approved the package the following day, the House did not pass it until February 3, ending the initial four-day shutdown.

When negotiations failed to reach a resolution during the extension, a second shutdown began on February 14. Consequently, Transportation Security Administration (TSA) employees missed their first full paycheck on March 13. By March 23, after long security lines at many airports due to TSA callouts, ICE agents were sent to airports to assist with security. On March 27, President Trump signed an executive order directing DHS to resume TSA payroll beginning March 30. That same day, the second shutdown became the longest in U.S. history. The DHS shutdown finally concluded on April 30, when the President signed a funding bill passed by the House.

== Background ==
=== 2026 federal budget ===
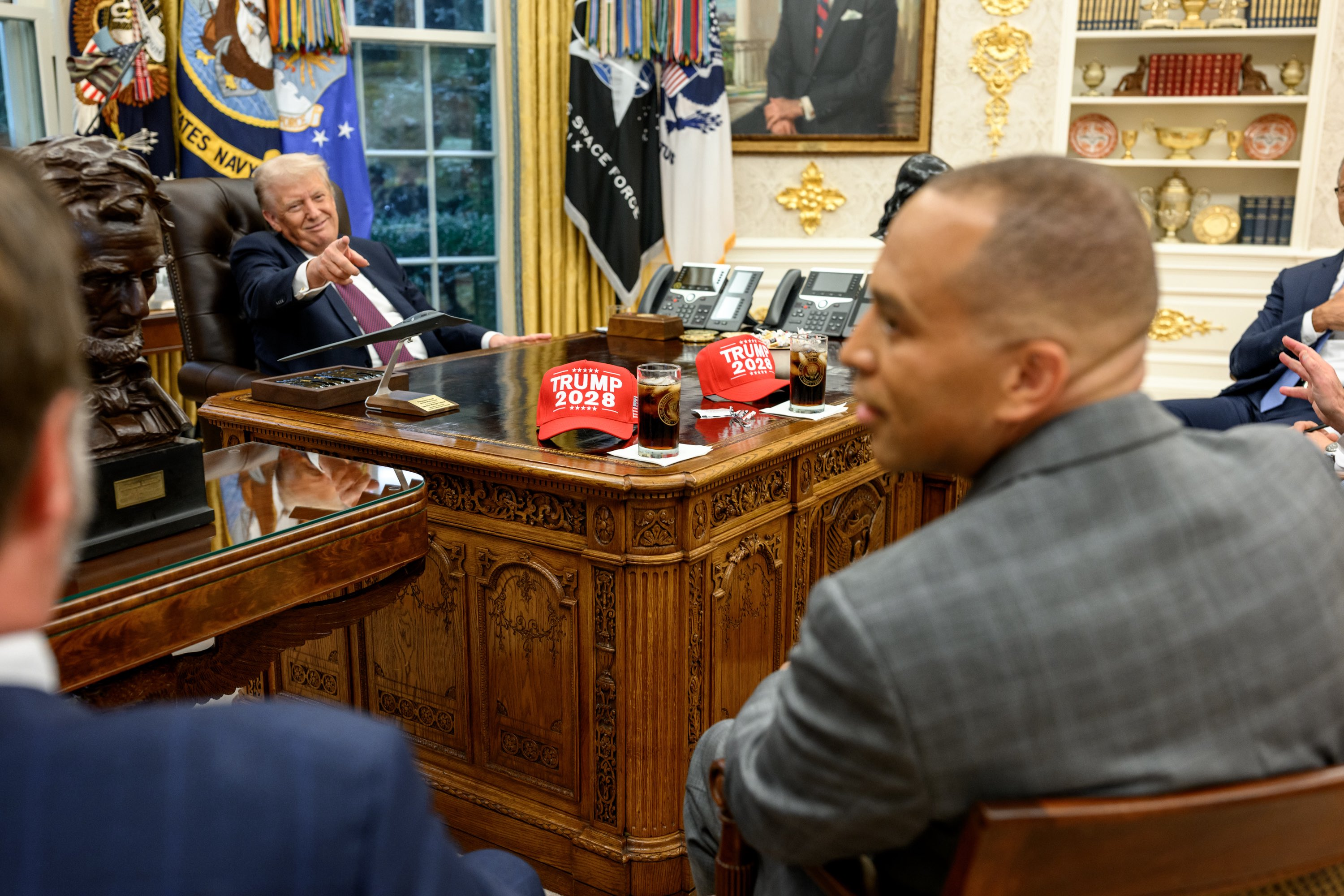
On September 30, 2025, President Donald Trump and congressional leaders held discussions that failed to avert a shutdown.

Article One of the United States Constitution vests the U.S. Congress with the authority to appropriate funds drawn from the Treasury. Political polarization has affected this process, often forcing lawmakers to pass continuing resolutions to temporarily fund the government. The failure of Congress to agree on funding legislation leads to a government shutdown when the previous funding term ends. In a government shutdown, federal agencies continue work categorized as "essential", but federal employees and contractors are furloughed and not immediately paid.

The 2025 federal government shutdown began after government funding expired on October 1, 2025. On November 9, 2025, after negotiations between Senate Democrats and Senate Republicans, a deal was revealed to end the shutdown. The agreement would include a continuing resolution that would fund the government until the end of January, and full-year appropriations bills for the Departments of Veterans Affairs and Agriculture, military construction, and the Legislative Branch.

A package was enacted in mid-January 2026 including the appropriations bills for Interior and Environment; Commerce, Justice, and science (including NASA and the National Science Foundation); and Energy and water development activities of the Army Corps of Engineers and Department of the Interior.

Later in January, the House and Senate reached agreements to pass the final three appropriations bills needed to avoid a partial government shutdown. These three bills passed the House on January 22, 2026.

=== Killing of Alex Pretti and Homeland Security funding ===
Following the killing of Alex Pretti by Customs and Border Protection (CBP) agents on January 24, 2026, Democrats in the Senate announced they would no longer support the Department of Homeland Security (DHS) bill, which funds CBP. Unlike the House, which voted on each of the three bills separately, the Senate voted only once on all the bills together. Therefore to oppose the Department of Homeland Security bill, Democrats would need to vote against the entire package.

On January 29, 2026, the Senate failed to advance the government funding package in a 45–55 vote. Seven Republicans joined all Democrats in opposing the bill. Most of the Republicans voting against the bill were fiscal conservatives, including Ron Johnson of Wisconsin, Tommy Tuberville of Alabama, Mike Lee of Utah, Rand Paul of Kentucky and Rick Scott and Ashley Moody of Florida. Unlike the Democrats, these Republicans are seeking more funding cuts and are generally opposed to a new deal between Republicans and Democrats for Homeland Security funding.

Later that day, a deal was announced in the Senate to separate the DHS funding bill, and pass a package containing the other five bills plus a two-week continuing resolution for DHS. Passage was briefly delayed by a hold placed by Senator Lindsey Graham, who opposed repeal of a provision allowing senators to sue over phone records collected during the Arctic Frost investigation, and the lack of full-year DHS appropriations. Graham removed the hold in return for votes on legislation to criminalize refusal of state and local officials to cooperate with federal immigration enforcement, and to expand eligibility of those investigated by Jack Smith to sue the Department of Justice. On January 30, the bill passed the Senate 71–29.

== First shutdown (January 31 – February 3) ==
=== Legislative actions in the House ===
After passing the Senate, Speaker of the House Mike Johnson said the House would not take up the bill until Monday, February 2, 2026 and pointed to the House's requirement that text be available 72 hours before a vote. As a result, the Office of Management and Budget said they would begin shutdown procedures at midnight on Saturday, January 31, when funding ran out.

Mike Johnson announced that he would look to pass the bill through suspension of the rules, which would have meant that a two-thirds majority is needed to pass bills, but avoids a separate rule vote to allow consideration of the bill. This would have needed at least 72 Democrats to vote with Republicans (if all Republicans voted for the bill). However, on Saturday, January 31, House Minority Leader Hakeem Jeffries informed Johnson that there wouldn't be enough Democratic votes to pass the bill under suspension. The rule committee then reported a rule for consideration of the bill on February 2 and the vote to end the shutdown happened on Tuesday, February 3.

Democratic House Minority Leader Hakeem Jeffries did not endorse the agreement and Democrat Greg Casar of Texas, chair of the Congressional Progressive Caucus, announced his opposition to the package. Other Democrats, including Steny Hoyer and Jim Clyburn, who both formerly were members of Democratic House leadership, and New Democrat Coalition Chair Brad Schneider, endorsed the package. Republicans Anna Paulina Luna of Florida and Tim Burchett of Tennessee, fiscal conservatives, threatened to oppose the bill if it was not coupled with legislation to require proof of citizenship to register to vote in federal elections.

Democrat Christian Menefee, who was elected in a special election on Saturday, January 31, was sworn in on Monday. This reduced the Republican majority in the House to 218–214, meaning that Republicans could only afford to lose one vote on party-line votes.

After a meeting with the White House on Monday, Republicans Anna Paulina Luna and Tim Burchett announced they would support the procedural rule vote after receiving assurances that the Senate would 'modify the fillibuster' to pass legislation to require voter ID and prevent non-citizens from voting. Though Republican Senate Majority Leader John Thune, the next day, denied that the Senate had agreed to modify the fillibuster. Later on Monday, House Rules Committee voted along party lines to advance the legislation to the House floor.

Prior to the procedural rule vote, and after Senator Thune denied a fillibuster agreement was in place, Republican John Rose of Tennessee called on Republicans to "hold the line" and vote against the rule because it did not include the SAVE Act. Initially, Rose would vote against the rule, along with Republican Thomas Massie and all Democrats. Republicans Andy Ogles, Byron Donalds, Victoria Spartz and Troy Nehls withheld their votes and were seen talking to Republican House leadership on the floor. However, after the choir was held open for 50 minutes, all the Republican holdouts except Massie voted for the rule.

On Tuesday, February 3, the House concurred with the Senate's amendment on the funding bill. The vote was 217–214 with 21 Republicans voting against and 21 Democrats voting for the bill with one Republican abstention. President Trump signed the bill the same day.

=== Effects ===
==== Agencies affected ====
Agencies affected by the shutdown include the Departments of State, Treasury, Defense (except functions listed below), Transportation, Housing and Urban Development, Health and Human Services, Labor, Education, and Homeland Security, as well as the Executive Office of the President, several independent agencies, and the Judicial Branch.

Agencies not affected are the Departments of Veterans Affairs, Agriculture, Interior, Commerce, Justice, and Energy; some functions of Defense (water development activities of the Army Corps of Engineers and military construction); some independent agencies including the Environmental Protection Agency, NASA, and National Science Foundation; and the Legislative Branch.

==== Specific effects ====
The Federal Emergency Management Agency had a fund of about $7–8 billion to continue responding to disaster and weather response, including the January 30–February 1, 2026 United States winter storm. However, other FEMA operations, like National Flood Insurance Program policies, shut down.

10,000 Federal Aviation Administration workers were furloughed as a result of the shutdown. In addition, air traffic controllers continued to work without pay.

About 8,000 of all 27,000 direct-hire State Department employees were furloughed as a result of the shutdown. Essential State Department services, including passport and visa services, along with the operation of embassies and consulates continued. Other services, such nonemergency consular notifications and website updates, were shut down.

The Internal Revenue Service (IRS) used money appropriated through the 2022 Inflation Reduction Act to avoid furloughs; the funding would have lasted until February 7 if the shutdown had lasted that long.

== Interlude ==
The continuing resolution for the Department of Homeland Security lasted through February 13, and negotiations about reforms to federal immigration enforcement were expected to occur. Congressional Democrats proposed several reforms to be included in the funding legislation, notably that federal agents:

- Must have a judicial warrant rather than an administrative warrant before entering private property
- Must verify that people are not U.S. citizens before detaining them
- Must not wear face masks and must wear standardized uniforms in line with civil enforcement rather than paramilitary-style gear
- Must wear body cameras and identification that includes their agency, ID number and last name
- Must not operate near medical facilities, schools, child care facilities, churches, polling places and courts, among other places
- Must not conduct stop or search based on "an individual's presence at certain locations, their job, their spoken language and accent, or their race and ethnicity"
- Must not undertake large-scale operations without state or local government consent
- Must be removed from the field while under investigation for an incident;
- State and local governments must be allowed to investigate and prosecute crimes committed by agents;
- DHS must adopt a reasonable use of force policy and expand training of its agents; and
- Those detained must be allowed immediate access to lawyers.

Congressional Republicans criticized the list as excessive, and that it would add unnecessary bureaucracy and endanger federal agents, although some said there was room for compromise. Republicans also made counterproposals to prevent harassment of federal agents, and to require local governments to cooperate with federal immigration authorities.

On Thursday, February 12, Democrats blocked a second two-week continuing resolution. Both the House and Senate then left Washington for a scheduled one-week recess. This essentially guaranteed there would be no vote to avert a shutdown before funding ran out at 12:01 a.m. ET on February 14. If a deal were to have been reached during the recess, the Senate was on 24-hour notice to return while the House was on 48-hour notice.

== Second shutdown (February 14 – April 30) ==
A second partial shutdown affecting only the Department of Homeland Security began on February 14, 2026. On March 29, it surpassed the 2025 United States federal government shutdown to become the longest shutdown in US history. Although still not receiving annual discretionary funding, immigration enforcement agencies were less affected because the 2025 One Big Beautiful Bill Act provides a pool of separate funding.

=== Legislative actions ===
Democrats and Republicans both blocked proposals to re-open DHS in both the House and Senate. In the Senate, Democrats proposed five different resolutions to reopen DHS, and Republicans blocked all five. Senate Democrats blocked seven proposals from Republicans to pass a continuing resolution to fund all or parts of DHS. Trump said he did not want to negotiate re-opening DHS until the SAVE Act is passed.

On March 26, 2026, Senate Democrats and Republicans reached an agreement to fund DHS except for ICE and the Border Patrol, intending to fund those through a reconciliation bill not subject to a filibuster. The new agreement does not include any major changes from the original January agreement. The funding was approved by the Senate in the morning of March 27, 2026, through voice vote. However, later that day, Republican House Speaker Mike Johnson announced that he would not allow a vote on the Senate passed agreement. Instead, House Republicans passed a 60-day continuing resolution that would fund all of DHS that was ignored by the Senate. The House eventually passed the Senate bill on April 30 on a voice vote with little opposition, and President Trump signed it the same day, ending the shutdown.

=== Effects ===
The initial effects of a DHS shutdown were expected to be limited. The three immigration agencies, Immigration and Customs Enforcement, Customs and Border Protection, and Citizenship and Immigration Services, only receive 60% of their funding from annual appropriations, with the remainder coming from mandatory funding, fees, and from the 2025 One Big Beautiful Bill Act. The Federal Emergency Management Agency disaster relief fund was expected to last 1–2 months, and the Coast Guard had funds to pay nearly 70,000 essential workers and active-duty members for several months. On February 22, 2026, non-disaster responses from FEMA were suspended.

Also on February 22, the DHS announced they would suspend TSA PreCheck and Global Entry (the latter a CBP program) as a result of the shutdown. The suspension of TSA PreCheck was reversed hours later. However, it was also announced later the same day that courtesy escorts at airports had been suspended. Global Entry was restarted on March 11.

TSA workers missed their first full paycheck on March 13. On March 17, the DHS said that 366 TSA officers had quit their jobs since the shutdown had begun. The department also said that callouts by TSA agents were increasing, reaching as high as 55% at William P. Hobby Airport. On March 23, ICE agents, who were still being paid, were sent to airports to assist TSA agents. Among the most affected airports was George Bush Intercontinental Airport in Houston, which that day had nearly four-hour wait times, with only two of its eight checkpoints operating for most of the day. ICE agents, untrained to perform security screening, did not improve wait times and were viewed by passengers as ineffective. On March 27, Trump signed an executive order directing DHS to pay TSA agents using other available funds as early as March 30. By April 27, over 1,110 TSA agents had quit out of a total workforce of around 50,000.

In late April, Secretary of Homeland Security Markwayne Mullin said that funding from the One Big Beautiful Bill would run out during the first full week of May, meaning that employee salaries could no longer be paid.

=== Responses ===
On March 24, Delta Air Lines announced that during the shutdown, congressional representatives would lose their ability to skip TSA security lines.

During the end of March, celebrity tabloid agency TMZ began locating, photographing and reporting on the locations of both Republican and Democratic legislative members as they took vacations during the shutdown. The tabloid had put out a public call for tips about sightings of the lawmakers and compiled and reported on them, so far posting about Lindsey Graham, John Thune, John Barrasso, Ted Cruz, Seth Magaziner, Robert Garcia and others. Garcia addressed the reporting stating that he had been visiting his father after the entire House was sent home by Speaker Mike Johnson, and that he felt TMZ was doing something positive.

== Aftermath ==
Although ICE and the Border Patrol still lacked funding from an annual appropriations bill, they were not subject to shutdown because they continued to be funded from the 2025 One Big Beautiful Bill Act. Congressional Republicans intended to fund them through a reconciliation bill not subject to a filibuster. On April 23, the Senate had passed a budget resolution for FY2026 (S.Con.Res. 33), a required step before considering the reconciliation bill.

Following these shutdowns, on May 14, the United States Senate unanimously passed a resolution withholding senators' pay during government shutdowns.

== Funding extension and avoidance of another shutdown ==
On September 1, 2026, the House of Representatives voted 370–48 to approve a continuing resolution extending federal funding through December 11. The measure, which had already passed the Senate, was intended to prevent a lapse in funding at the start of the new fiscal year and give Congress more time to complete the twelve full-year appropriations bills. With the November midterm elections approaching, lawmakers from both parties sought to avoid another shutdown amid voter concerns about the high cost of food and housing, the war with Iran, and tariffs. The measure did not resolve the broader disputes over federal spending, however, leaving Congress to revisit the issue later in the year.

On September 2, 2026, President Donald Trump signed the funding bill into law, extending federal funding through December 11 and preventing the government shutdown that would have begun on October 1. This gave Congress additional time to finish the remaining appropriations bills, although broader disagreements over federal spending remained unsettled.

On September 25, 2026, the Trump administration reached a settlement with federal employee unions over proposals to allow agencies to carry out mass layoffs during government shutdowns. Under the settlement, the administration agreed to withdraw guidance authorizing agencies to initiate such layoffs, while agencies would remove blanket authorisation for layoffs from their shutdown plans and give unions 30 days' notice before making changes to those plans. The dispute stemmed from the 2025 shutdown, when unions challenged plans for mass layoffs; a federal judge had previously blocked more than 4,000 planned layoffs while the case was pending.Under the settlement, about 4,200 layoff notices issued during the 2025 shutdown were rescinded, and employees who had been separated under those notices were to be reinstated. The settlement came as the federal workforce had already declined by 12% between September 2024 and January 2026, according to Reuters, underscoring the broader job-security pressures facing federal employees.

The continuing resolution also delayed the planned Office of Management and Budget rule regarding federal grants, postponing its implementation until 11 December. Originally scheduled to take effect on October 1, the rule would have altered the way federal agencies distribute and oversee financial assistance, including grants for researchers and state and local governments. The delay deferred these changes while Congress continued to work on full-year funding bills.

On September 28, 2026, the Office of Management and Budget issued instructions on how funds would be apportioned under the continuing resolution for fiscal year 2027. The instructions set out how federal agencies would manage their funding during the temporary extension through December 11, while Congress continued work on the full-year appropriations.
