= 1995–1996 United States federal government shutdowns =

As a result of conflicts between Democratic President Bill Clinton and the Republican Congress over funding for education, the environment, and public health in the 1996 federal budget, the United States federal government shut down from November 14 through November 19, 1995, and from December 16, 1995, to January 6, 1996, for 5 and 21 days, respectively. Republicans also threatened not to raise the debt ceiling.

The first shutdown occurred after Clinton vetoed the spending bill the Republican-controlled Congress sent him, as Clinton opposed the budget cuts favored by Speaker of the House Newt Gingrich and other Republicans. The first budget shutdown ended after Congress passed a temporary budget bill, but the government shut down again after Republicans and Democrats were unable to agree on a long-term budget bill. The second shutdown ended with congressional Republicans accepting Clinton's budget proposal. The first of the two shutdowns caused the furlough of about 800,000 workers, while the second caused about 284,000 workers to be furloughed.

Polling generally showed that most respondents blamed congressional Republicans for the shutdowns, and Clinton's handling of the shutdowns may have bolstered his ultimately successful campaign in the 1996 presidential election. The second of the two shutdowns was the longest government shutdown in U.S. history until the 2018–2019 government shutdown surpassed it in January 2019.

== Background ==
When the previous fiscal year ended on September 30, 1995, the Democratic president and the Republican-controlled Congress had not passed a budget. A majority of Congress members and the House Speaker, Newt Gingrich, had promised to slow the rate of government spending; however, this conflicted with the President's objectives for education, the environment, Medicare, and public health. According to Bill Clinton's autobiography, their differences resulted from differing estimates of economic growth, medical inflation, and anticipated revenues.

When Clinton refused to cut the budget in the way Republicans wanted, Gingrich threatened to refuse to raise the debt limit, which would have caused the United States Treasury to suspend funding other portions of the government to avoid putting the country in default.

Clinton said Republican amendments would strip the U.S. Treasury of its ability to dip into federal trust funds to avoid a borrowing crisis. Republican amendments would have limited appeals by death-row inmates, made it harder to issue health, safety and environmental regulations, and would have committed the President to a seven-year budget plan. Clinton vetoed a second bill allowing the government to keep operating beyond the time when most spending authority expires. A GOP amendment opposed by Clinton would not only have increased Medicare Part B premiums, but it would also cancel a scheduled reduction. The Republicans held out for an increase in Medicare part B premiums in January 1996 to $53.50 a month. Clinton favored the then current law, which was to let the premium that seniors pay drop to $42.50.

Since a budget for the new fiscal year was not approved, on October 1 the entire federal government operated on a continuing resolution authorizing interim funding for departments until new budgets were approved. The continuing resolution was set to expire on November 13 at midnight, at which time non-essential government services were required to cease operations in order to prevent expending funds that had not yet been appropriated. Congress passed a continuing resolution for funding and a bill to limit debt, which Clinton vetoed as he denounced them as "backdoor efforts" to cut the budget in a partisan manner.

On November 13, Republican and Democratic leaders, including Vice President Al Gore, Dick Armey, and Bob Dole, met to try to resolve the budget and were unable to reach an agreement.

== Events ==
Daily News cover illustrated by Ed Murawinski

On November 14, major portions of the federal government suspended operations. The Clinton administration later released figures detailing the costs of the shutdown, which included payments of approximately $400 million to furloughed federal employees who did not report to work.

The first budget shutdown concluded with Congress enacting a temporary spending bill, but the underlying disagreement between Gingrich and Clinton was not resolved. The government shut down again on December 16 after Clinton vetoed a Republican budget proposal that would have extended tax cuts to the wealthy, cut spending on social programs, and shifted control of Medicaid to the states. After a 21-day government shutdown, Republicans accepted Clinton's budget, as polling showed that many members of the public blamed Republicans for the shutdown.

During the crisis, while being questioned by Lars-Erik Nelson at a breakfast held by The Christian Science Monitor, Gingrich made a complaint that, during a flight to and from Yitzhak Rabin's funeral in Israel, Clinton had not taken the opportunity to talk about the budget and Gingrich had been directed to leave the plane via the rear door. The perception arose that the Republican stance on the budget was partly due to this "snub" by Clinton, and media coverage reflected this perception, including an editorial cartoon which depicted Gingrich as an infant throwing a temper tantrum. Opposing politicians used this opportunity to attack Gingrich's motives for the budget standoff. Later, the polls suggested that the event damaged Gingrich politically and he referred to his comments as his "single most avoidable mistake" as Speaker.

=== Affected agencies ===
Agencies affected by the shutdowns
Agencies	First shutdown	Second shutdown	Final bill
Military Construction	Not affected	Not affected	H.R. 1817
Agriculture, Rural Development, and Food and Drug Administration	Not affected	Not affected	H.R. 1976
Energy and Water Development	Not affected	Not affected	H.R. 1905
Transportation	Shut down, reopened early	Not affected	H.R. 2002
Treasury, Postal Service, and General Government	Shut down	Not affected	H.R. 2020
Legislative Branch	Shut down	Not affected	H.R. 2492
Defense	Shut down	Not affected	H.R. 2126
Foreign Operations and Export Financing	Shut down	Shut down	H.R. 1868
District of Columbia	Shut down	Shut down, reopened early	H.R. 3019
Commerce, Justice, State, and the Judiciary	Shut down	Shut down	H.R. 3019
Interior	Shut down	Shut down	H.R. 3019
Labor, Health and Human Services, and Education	Shut down	Shut down	H.R. 3019
Veterans Affairs, Housing and Urban Development, and independent agencies	Shut down	Shut down	H.R. 3019

== Response ==
In Arizona, where Grand Canyon National Park was closed for the first time in its history, governor Fife Symington ordered the Arizona National Guard to reopen the park due to the shutdown's effects on local tourism revenue. On November 17, Symington arrived at a closed gate for the park with 50 members of the Arizona National Guard to demand its reopening. State Park Director Ken Travous came as well to help negotiate a plan to keep the Park open. All the State Park managers arrived as well to help manage the park if it reopened. John F. Long contributed $55,000 to keep the park open for three days. A budget agreement was later passed to reopen the National Park with State Parks Heritage Fund monies. The Federal Rangers kept the Park open. Funds remained in place through the December shutdown. State Parks funds and John F. long funds were returned.

== Result ==
A 1995 ABC News poll had Republicans receiving the brunt of the blame with 46% of respondents compared to the 27% that blamed Clinton. Clinton's Gallup approval rating stood at 51% in the early days of the December shutdown, but fell significantly to 42% as it progressed into January. Once the shutdown had ended, however, his Gallup approval ratings rose to their highest since his election.

The shutdown also influenced the 1996 Presidential election. Bob Dole, the Senate Majority Leader, was running for president in 1996. Due to his need to campaign, Dole wanted to solve the budget crisis in January 1996 despite the willingness of other Republicans to continue the shutdown unless their demands were met. In particular, as Gingrich and Dole had been seen as potential rivals for the 1996 Presidential nomination, they had a tense working relationship. The shutdown was cited by Clinton aide George Stephanopoulos as having a role in Clinton's successful 1996 re-election.

According to Gingrich, positive impacts of the government shutdown included the balanced-budget deal in 1997 and the first four consecutive balanced budgets since the 1920s. In addition, Gingrich stated that the first re-election of a Republican majority since 1928 was due in part to the Republican Party's hard line on the budget. The Republican Party had a net loss of eight seats in the House in the 1996 elections but retained a 227-206-seat majority in the upcoming 105th United States Congress. In the Senate, Republicans gained two seats.

A 2010 Congressional Research Service report summarized other details of the 1995–1996 government shutdowns, indicating the shutdown impacted all sectors of the economy. The Centers for Disease Control and Prevention stopped disease surveillance; new clinical research patients were not accepted at the National Institutes of Health; and toxic waste cleanup at 609 sites was halted. Other impacts included: the closure of 368 National Park sites resulted in the loss of some seven million visitors; 200,000 applications for passports were not processed; and 20,000–30,000 applications by foreigners for visas went unprocessed each day; U.S. tourism and airline industries incurred millions of dollars in losses; more than 20% of federal contracts, representing $3.7 billion in spending, were affected adversely. Military pay and benefits however were not adversely affected as resolutions were imparted to ensure payments were received as scheduled.

== See also ==
- North American blizzard of 1996
- 2013 United States federal government shutdown
- 2018–2019 United States federal government shutdown
- Appropriations bill (United States)
