= United States Senate Appropriations Subcommittee on Labor, Health and Human Services, Education, and Related Agencies =

The United States Senate Appropriations Subcommittee on Labor, Health and Human Services, Education, and Related Agencies is one of twelve subcommittees of the United States Senate Committee on Appropriations.

The United States Senate Committee on Appropriations has joint jurisdiction with the United States House Committee on Appropriations over all appropriations bills in the United States Congress. Each committee has 12 matching subcommittees, each of which is tasked with working on one of the twelve annual regular appropriations bills. This subcommittee has jurisdiction over the budget for the United States Department of Labor, the United States Department of Health and Human Services, and the United States Department of Education.

== Appropriations process ==
Traditionally, after a federal budget for the upcoming fiscal year has been passed, the appropriations subcommittees receive information about what the budget sets as their spending ceilings. This is called "302(b) allocations" after section 302(b) of the Congressional Budget Act of 1974. That amount is separated into smaller amounts for each of the twelve Subcommittees. The federal budget does not become law and is not signed by the President. Instead, it is guide for the House and the Senate in making appropriations and tax decisions. However, no budget is required and each chamber has procedures in place for what to do without one. The House and Senate now consider appropriations bills simultaneously, although originally the House went first. The House Committee on Appropriations usually reports the appropriations bills in May and June and the Senate in June. Any differences between appropriations bills passed by the House and the Senate are resolved in the fall.

== Appropriations bills ==
An appropriations bill is a bill that appropriates (gives to, sets aside for) money to specific federal government departments, agencies, and programs. The money provides funding for operations, personnel, equipment, and activities. Regular appropriations bills are passed annually, with the funding they provide covering one fiscal year. The fiscal year is the accounting period of the federal government, which runs from October 1 to September 30 of the following year.

There are three types of appropriations bills: regular appropriations bills, continuing resolutions, and supplemental appropriations bills. Regular appropriations bills are the twelve standard bills that cover the funding for the federal government for one fiscal year and that are supposed to be enacted into law by October 1. If Congress has not enacted the regular appropriations bills by the time, it can pass a continuing resolution, which continues the pre-existing appropriations at the same levels as the previous fiscal year (or with minor modifications) for a set amount of time. The third type of appropriations bills are supplemental appropriations bills, which add additional funding above and beyond what was originally appropriated at the beginning of the fiscal year. Supplemental appropriations bills can be used for things like disaster relief.

Appropriations bills are one part of a larger United States budget and spending process. They are preceded in that process by the president's budget proposal, congressional budget resolutions, and the 302(b) allocation. Article One of the United States Constitution, section 9, clause 7, states that "No money shall be drawn from the Treasury, but in Consequence of Appropriations made by Law..." This is what gives Congress the power to make these appropriations. The President, however, still has the power to veto appropriations bills.

== Jurisdiction ==
This subcommittee oversees funding for the Departments of Education, Health and Human Services, and Labor. Certain agencies within Health and Human Services are handled by separate subcommittees, such as the Indian Health Service (Interior Subcommittee) and the Food and Drug Administration (Agriculture Subcommittee).

It also oversees funding for several related labor, health, and education agencies, including the Corporation for National and Community Service, Corporation for Public Broadcasting, the Mine Safety and Health Administration, and the Occupational Safety and Health Administration.

== Members, 119th Congress ==
Majority	Minority
Shelley Moore Capito, West Virginia, Chair; Lindsey Graham, South Carolina (until July 11, 2026); Jerry Moran, Kansas; John Kennedy, Louisiana; Cindy Hyde-Smith, Mississippi; John Boozman, Arkansas; Katie Britt, Alabama; Markwayne Mullin, Oklahoma (until March 23, 2026); Mike Rounds, South Dakota; Jon Husted, Ohio (from March 27, 2026); Darline Graham, South Carolina (from July 22, 2026)	Tammy Baldwin, Wisconsin, Ranking Member; Patty Murray, Washington; Dick Durbin, Illinois; Jack Reed, Rhode Island; Jeanne Shaheen, New Hampshire; Jeff Merkley, Oregon; Brian Schatz, Hawaii; Chris Murphy, Connecticut
Ex officio
Susan Collins, Maine	

== Historical subcommittee rosters ==
=== 116th Congress ===
Majority	Minority
Roy Blunt, Missouri, Chairman; Richard Shelby, Alabama; Lamar Alexander, Tennessee; Lindsey Graham, South Carolina; Jerry Moran, Kansas; Shelley Moore Capito, West Virginia; John Kennedy, Louisiana; Cindy Hyde-Smith, Mississippi; Marco Rubio, Florida; James Lankford, Oklahoma	Patty Murray, Washington, Ranking Member; Dick Durbin, Illinois; Jack Reed, Rhode Island; Jeanne Shaheen, New Hampshire; Jeff Merkley, Oregon; Brian Schatz, Hawaii; Tammy Baldwin, Wisconsin; Chris Murphy, Connecticut; Joe Manchin, West Virginia
Ex officio
	Patrick Leahy, Vermont

=== 117th Congress ===
Majority	Minority
Patty Murray, Washington, Chair; Dick Durbin, Illinois; Jack Reed, Rhode Island; Jeanne Shaheen, New Hampshire; Jeff Merkley, Oregon; Brian Schatz, Hawaii; Tammy Baldwin, Wisconsin; Chris Murphy, Connecticut; Joe Manchin, West Virginia	Roy Blunt, Missouri, Ranking Member; Richard Shelby, Alabama; Lindsey Graham, South Carolina; Jerry Moran, Kansas; Shelley Moore Capito, West Virginia; John Kennedy, Louisiana; Cindy Hyde-Smith, Mississippi; Mike Braun, Indiana; Marco Rubio, Florida
Ex officio
Patrick Leahy, Vermont	

=== 118th Congress ===
Majority	Minority
Tammy Baldwin, Wisconsin, Chair; Dick Durbin, Illinois; Jack Reed, Rhode Island; Jeanne Shaheen, New Hampshire; Jeff Merkley, Oregon; Brian Schatz, Hawaii; Patty Murray, Washington; Chris Murphy, Connecticut; Joe Manchin, West Virginia	Shelley Moore Capito, West Virginia, Ranking Member; Katie Britt, Alabama; Lindsey Graham, South Carolina; Jerry Moran, Kansas; John Boozman, Arkansas; John Kennedy, Louisiana; Cindy Hyde-Smith, Mississippi; Marco Rubio, Florida
Ex officio
	Susan Collins, Maine

== See also ==
- United States House Appropriations Subcommittee on Labor, Health and Human Services, Education, and Related Agencies
