= 2020 United States presidential election in Mississippi =

- November 3, 2020
- Turnout: 60.4% ▲

| Nominee | Donald Trump | Joe Biden |
| Party | Republican | Democratic |
| Home state | Florida | Delaware |
| Running mate | Mike Pence | Kamala Harris |
| Electoral vote | 6 | 0 |
| Popular vote | 756,764 | 539,398 |
| Percentage | 57.60% | 41.06% |

Trump
40–50%
50–60%
60–70%
70–80%
80–90%
90–100%
Biden
40–50%
50–60%
60–70%
70–80%
80–90%
90–100%
Tie/No Data
President before election
Donald Trump
Republican
Elected President
Joe Biden
Democratic

The 2020 United States presidential election in Mississippi was held on Tuesday, November 3, 2020, as part of the 2020 United States presidential election in which all 50 states plus the District of Columbia participated. Mississippi voters chose electors to represent them in the Electoral College via a popular vote, pitting the Republican Party's nominee, incumbent President Donald Trump, and running mate Vice President Mike Pence against Democratic Party nominee, former Vice President Joe Biden, and his running mate California Senator Kamala Harris. Mississippi has six electoral votes in the Electoral College.

Trump scored a convincing victory in Mississippi, a socially conservative Bible Belt state. Biden's main support was in the western Delta counties next to the Mississippi River, and in Hinds County, home to the state capital and largest city of Jackson. In contrast, Trump's margins came from the regions bordering the Gulf Coast, the northeast Appalachian area, and the Jackson and Memphis suburbs. Trump's strength also came from winning 81% of the White vote, which constituted 69% of the electorate.

As is the case in many Southern states, there was a stark racial divide in voting for this election: 82% of White Mississippi voters supported Trump, while 93% of Black Mississippi voters supported Biden. 57% of voters believed abortion should be illegal in all or most cases and they backed the president 82%-17%. Trump also received 89% of the white Evangelical vote, which made up 54% of the electorate. Biden flipped Warren County, with 49.6% of the vote to Trump's 49.2%.

== Primary elections ==
The primary elections were held on March 10, 2020.

=== Republican primary ===
Incumbent President Donald Trump was challenged by two candidates: businessman and perennial candidate Rocky De La Fuente of California, and former governor Bill Weld of Massachusetts.

2020 Mississippi Republican primary
| Candidate | Votes | % | Estimated delegates |
|---|---|---|---|
| Donald Trump (incumbent) | 240,125 | 98.6% | 40 |
| Bill Weld | 2,292 | 0.9% | 0 |
| Rocky De La Fuente | 1,078 | 0.4% | 0 |
| Total | 243,495 | 100% | 40 |

=== Democratic primary ===
Congresswoman Tulsi Gabbard of Hawaii, Senator Bernie Sanders of Vermont and former Vice President Joe Biden were the major declared candidates still active in the race.

2020 Mississippi Democratic presidential primary
| Candidate | Votes | % | Delegates |
|---|---|---|---|
| Joe Biden | 222,160 | 80.96 | 34 |
| Bernie Sanders | 40,657 | 14.82 | 2 |
| Michael Bloomberg (withdrawn) | 6,933 | 2.53 | |
| Elizabeth Warren (withdrawn) | 1,550 | 0.56 | |
| Tulsi Gabbard | 1,003 | 0.37 | |
| Pete Buttigieg (withdrawn) | 562 | 0.20 | |
| Andrew Yang (withdrawn) | 450 | 0.16 | |
| Amy Klobuchar (withdrawn) | 440 | 0.16 | |
| Tom Steyer (withdrawn) | 378 | 0.14 | |
| Deval Patrick (withdrawn) | 258 | 0.09 | |
| Total | 274,391 | 100% | 36 |

== General election ==
=== Predictions ===
| Source | Ranking | As of |
|---|---|---|
| The Cook Political Report | Safe R | September 10, 2020 |
| Inside Elections | Safe R | September 4, 2020 |
| Sabato's Crystal Ball | Safe R | July 14, 2020 |
| Politico | Safe R | September 8, 2020 |
| RCP | Likely R | August 3, 2020 |
| Niskanen | Safe R | July 26, 2020 |
| CNN | Safe R | August 3, 2020 |
| The Economist | Likely R | September 2, 2020 |
| CBS News | Likely R | August 16, 2020 |
| 270towin | Safe R | August 2, 2020 |
| ABC News | Safe R | July 31, 2020 |
| NPR | Likely R | August 3, 2020 |
| NBC News | Safe R | August 6, 2020 |
| 538 | Likely R | November 2, 2020 |

=== Polling ===
View source data.

Aggregate polls

| Source of poll aggregation | Dates administered | Dates updated | Joe Biden Democratic | Donald Trump Republican | Other/ Undecided (Note: Calculated by taking the difference of 100% and all other candidates combined.) | Margin |
|---|---|---|---|---|---|---|
| 270 to Win | October 17–27, 2020 | November 3, 2020 | 40.0% | 57.0% | 3.0% | Trump +17.0 |
| FiveThirtyEight | until November 2, 2020 | November 3, 2020 | 39.6% | 55.5% | 4.9% | Trump +15.9 |
| Average | | | 39.8% | 56.3% | 3.9% | Trump +16.5 |

Polls

| Poll source | Date(s) administered | Sample size (Note: Key: A – all adults RV – registered voters LV – likely voters V – unclear) | Margin of error | Donald Trump Republican | Joe Biden Democratic | Jo Jorgensen Libertarian | Howie Hawkins Green | Other | Undecided |
|---|---|---|---|---|---|---|---|---|---|
| SurveyMonkey/Axios | Oct 20 – Nov 2, 2020 | 1,461 (LV) | ± 4% | 61% (Note: Overlapping sample with the previous SurveyMonkey/Axios poll, but more information available regarding sample size) | 37% | - | - | – | – |
| Data For Progress | Oct 27 – Nov 1, 2020 | 562 (LV) | ± 4.1% | 55% | 41% | 2% | 1% | 1% (Note: "Other candidate or write-in" with 1%) | – |
| Civiqs/Daily Kos | Oct 23–26, 2020 | 507 (LV) | ± 5.3% | 55% | 41% | - | - | 3% (Note: "Someone else" with 3%) | 1% |
| SurveyMonkey/Axios | Oct 1–28, 2020 | 2,116 (LV) | – | 62% | 37% | - | - | – | – |
| SurveyMonkey/Axios | Sep 1–30, 2020 | 782 (LV) | – | 55% | 44% | - | - | – | 1% |
| SurveyMonkey/Axios | Aug 1–31, 2020 | 607 (LV) | – | 61% | 36% | - | - | – | 3% |
| Tyson Group/Consumer Energy Alliance (Note: The Consumer Energy Alliance is a pro-Keystone XL lobbying group) | Aug 28–30, 2020 | 600 (LV) | ± 4% | 50% | 40% | No voters | - | No voters (Note: "Refused" with no voters) | 6% |
| Garin-Hart-Yang Research Group/Mike Espy (Note: Poll sponsored by Espy's campaign) | Jul 30 – Aug 9, 2020 | 600 (LV) | ± 4.1% | 53% (Note: Additional data sourced from FiveThirtyEight) | 43% | - | - | – | – |
| SurveyMonkey/Axios | Jul 1–31, 2020 | 733 (LV) | – | 59% | 39% | - | - | – | 2% |
| SurveyMonkey/Axios | Jun 8–30, 2020 | 425 (LV) | – | 63% | 35% | - | - | – | 2% |
| Chism Strategies (D) | Jun 2–4, 2020 | 568 (LV) | ± 4.1% | 50% | 41% | - | - | 6% (Note: "Someone else" with 6%) | 3% |
| Chism Strategies/Millsaps College | Apr 8–9, 2020 | 508 (RV) | ± 4.4% | 49% | 38% | - | - | 7% | 7% |
| Mason-Dixon | Feb 26–28, 2020 | 625 (RV) | ± 4.0% | 56% | 41% | - | - | – | 3% |

Former candidates

Donald Trump vs. Bernie Sanders

| Poll source | Date(s) administered | Sample size | Margin of error | Donald Trump (R) | Bernie Sanders (D) | Undecided |
|---|---|---|---|---|---|---|
| Mason-Dixon | Feb 26–28, 2020 | 625 (RV) | ± 4.0% | 59% | 36% | 5% |

=== Results ===
2020 United States presidential election in Mississippi
| Party | Candidate | Votes | % | ±% |
|---|---|---|---|---|
| Republican | Donald Trump Mike Pence | 756,764 | 57.60% | −0.34% |
| Democratic | Joe Biden Kamala Harris | 539,398 | 41.06% | +0.95% |
| Libertarian | Jo Jorgensen Spike Cohen | 8,026 | 0.61% | −0.58% |
| Independent | Kanye West Michelle Tidball | 3,657 | 0.28% | N/A |
| Green | Howie Hawkins Angela Walker | 1,498 | 0.11% | −0.20% |
| Prohibition | Phil Collins Billy Joe Parker | 1,317 | 0.10% | +0.04% |
| Constitution | Don Blankenship William Mohr | 1,279 | 0.10% | −0.23% |
| American Solidarity | Brian T. Carroll Amar Patel | 1,161 | 0.09% | N/A |
| Independent | Brock Pierce Karla Ballard | 659 | 0.05% | N/A |
| Total votes | | 1,313,759 | 100.00% | N/A |

==== By county ====
| County | Donald Trump Republican | | Joe Biden Democratic | | Various candidates Other parties | | Margin | | Total |
| County | # | % | # | % | # | % | # | % | Total |
|---|---|---|---|---|---|---|---|---|---|
| Adams | 5,696 | 41.40% | 7,917 | 57.54% | 146 | 1.06% | -2,221 | -16.14% | 13,759 |
| Alcorn | 12,818 | 81.16% | 2,782 | 17.62% | 193 | 1.22% | 10,036 | 63.55% | 15,793 |
| Amite | 4,503 | 62.58% | 2,620 | 36.41% | 73 | 1.01% | 1,883 | 26.17% | 7,196 |
| Attala | 5,178 | 58.69% | 3,542 | 40.15% | 103 | 1.17% | 1,636 | 18.54% | 8,823 |
| Benton | 2,570 | 59.92% | 1,679 | 39.15% | 40 | 0.93% | 891 | 20.77% | 4,289 |
| Bolivar | 4,671 | 33.99% | 8,904 | 64.78% | 169 | 1.23% | -4,233 | -30.80% | 13,744 |
| Calhoun | 4,625 | 70.18% | 1,902 | 28.86% | 63 | 0.96% | 2,723 | 41.32% | 6,590 |
| Carroll | 3,924 | 68.83% | 1,729 | 30.33% | 48 | 0.84% | 2,195 | 38.50% | 5,701 |
| Chickasaw | 4,175 | 51.28% | 3,810 | 46.80% | 156 | 1.92% | 365 | 4.48% | 8,141 |
| Choctaw | 3,001 | 71.06% | 1,185 | 28.06% | 37 | 0.88% | 1,816 | 43.00% | 4,223 |
| Claiborne | 603 | 13.55% | 3,772 | 84.78% | 74 | 1.66% | -3,169 | -71.23% | 4,449 |
| Clarke | 5,417 | 64.97% | 2,838 | 34.04% | 83 | 1.00% | 2,579 | 30.93% | 8,338 |
| Clay | 4,181 | 41.03% | 5,844 | 57.36% | 164 | 1.61% | -1,663 | -16.32% | 10,189 |
| Coahoma | 2,375 | 27.94% | 6,020 | 70.82% | 106 | 1.25% | -3,645 | -42.88% | 8,501 |
| Copiah | 6,250 | 48.51% | 6,470 | 50.22% | 163 | 1.27% | -220 | -1.71% | 12,883 |
| Covington | 5,854 | 62.54% | 3,416 | 36.50% | 90 | 0.96% | 2,438 | 26.05% | 9,360 |
| DeSoto | 46,462 | 61.03% | 28,265 | 37.13% | 1,397 | 1.84% | 18,197 | 23.90% | 76,124 |
| Forrest | 17,290 | 54.62% | 13,755 | 43.45% | 609 | 1.92% | 3,535 | 11.17% | 31,654 |
| Franklin | 2,923 | 65.52% | 1,480 | 33.18% | 58 | 1.30% | 1,443 | 32.35% | 4,461 |
| George | 9,713 | 87.91% | 1,218 | 11.02% | 118 | 1.07% | 8,495 | 76.88% | 11,049 |
| Greene | 4,794 | 82.48% | 966 | 16.62% | 52 | 0.89% | 3,828 | 65.86% | 5,812 |
| Grenada | 6,081 | 55.73% | 4,734 | 43.39% | 96 | 0.88% | 1,347 | 12.35% | 10,911 |
| Hancock | 16,132 | 76.98% | 4,504 | 21.49% | 321 | 1.53% | 11,628 | 55.49% | 20,957 |
| Harrison | 46,822 | 61.80% | 27,728 | 36.60% | 1,218 | 1.61% | 19,094 | 25.20% | 75,768 |
| Hinds | 25,141 | 25.14% | 73,550 | 73.55% | 1,304 | 1.30% | -48,409 | -48.41% | 99,995 |
| Holmes | 1,369 | 16.87% | 6,588 | 81.18% | 158 | 1.95% | -5,219 | -64.31% | 8,115 |
| Humphreys | 1,118 | 26.69% | 3,016 | 72.00% | 55 | 1.31% | -1,898 | -45.31% | 4,189 |
| Issaquena | 308 | 45.56% | 355 | 52.51% | 13 | 1.92% | -47 | -6.95% | 676 |
| Itawamba | 9,438 | 87.24% | 1,249 | 11.54% | 132 | 1.22% | 8,189 | 75.69% | 10,819 |
| Jackson | 36,295 | 66.54% | 17,375 | 31.86% | 873 | 1.60% | 18,920 | 34.69% | 54,543 |
| Jasper | 4,302 | 49.24% | 4,341 | 49.69% | 93 | 1.06% | -39 | -0.45% | 8,736 |
| Jefferson | 531 | 13.59% | 3,327 | 85.13% | 50 | 1.28% | -2,796 | -71.55% | 3,908 |
| Jefferson Davis | 2,534 | 40.79% | 3,599 | 57.93% | 80 | 1.29% | -1,065 | -17.14% | 6,213 |
| Jones | 21,226 | 70.54% | 8,517 | 28.30% | 348 | 1.16% | 12,709 | 42.24% | 30,091 |
| Kemper | 1,787 | 37.77% | 2,887 | 61.02% | 57 | 1.20% | -1,100 | -23.25% | 4,731 |
| Lafayette | 12,949 | 55.28% | 10,070 | 42.99% | 404 | 1.72% | 2,879 | 12.29% | 23,423 |
| Lamar | 20,704 | 72.68% | 7,340 | 25.77% | 441 | 1.55% | 13,364 | 46.92% | 28,485 |
| Lauderdale | 17,967 | 57.50% | 12,960 | 41.48% | 320 | 1.02% | 5,007 | 16.02% | 31,247 |
| Lawrence | 4,285 | 64.80% | 2,260 | 34.18% | 68 | 1.03% | 2,025 | 30.62% | 6,613 |
| Leake | 5,228 | 56.83% | 3,897 | 42.36% | 75 | 0.82% | 1,331 | 14.47% | 9,200 |
| Lee | 24,207 | 65.51% | 12,189 | 32.98% | 558 | 1.51% | 12,018 | 32.52% | 36,954 |
| Leflore | 3,129 | 28.72% | 7,648 | 70.21% | 116 | 1.06% | -4,519 | -41.49% | 10,893 |
| Lincoln | 11,596 | 69.02% | 5,040 | 30.00% | 165 | 0.98% | 6,556 | 39.02% | 16,801 |
| Lowndes | 13,800 | 50.66% | 13,087 | 48.04% | 354 | 1.30% | 713 | 2.62% | 27,241 |
| Madison | 31,091 | 55.31% | 24,440 | 43.48% | 681 | 1.21% | 6,651 | 11.83% | 56,212 |
| Marion | 8,273 | 67.94% | 3,787 | 31.10% | 117 | 0.96% | 4,486 | 36.84% | 12,177 |
| Marshall | 7,566 | 47.83% | 8,057 | 50.94% | 194 | 1.23% | -491 | -3.10% | 15,817 |
| Monroe | 11,177 | 64.76% | 5,874 | 34.03% | 208 | 1.21% | 5,303 | 30.73% | 17,259 |
| Montgomery | 2,917 | 57.48% | 2,121 | 41.79% | 37 | 0.73% | 796 | 15.68% | 5,075 |
| Neshoba | 8,320 | 71.09% | 3,260 | 27.86% | 123 | 1.05% | 5,060 | 43.24% | 11,703 |
| Newton | 6,997 | 68.71% | 3,075 | 30.20% | 111 | 1.09% | 3,922 | 38.52% | 10,183 |
| Noxubee | 1,240 | 23.23% | 4,040 | 75.67% | 59 | 1.11% | -2,800 | -52.44% | 5,339 |
| Oktibbeha | 9,004 | 45.57% | 10,299 | 52.13% | 454 | 2.30% | -1,295 | -6.55% | 19,757 |
| Panola | 8,060 | 51.58% | 7,403 | 47.37% | 164 | 1.05% | 657 | 4.20% | 15,627 |
| Pearl River | 19,595 | 81.53% | 4,148 | 17.26% | 290 | 1.21% | 15,447 | 64.27% | 24,033 |
| Perry | 4,500 | 76.06% | 1,362 | 23.02% | 54 | 0.91% | 3,138 | 53.04% | 5,916 |
| Pike | 8,479 | 48.89% | 8,646 | 49.86% | 217 | 1.25% | -167 | -0.96% | 17,342 |
| Pontotoc | 11,550 | 80.43% | 2,614 | 18.20% | 197 | 1.37% | 8,936 | 62.22% | 14,361 |
| Prentiss | 8,370 | 78.64% | 2,153 | 20.23% | 121 | 1.14% | 6,217 | 58.41% | 10,644 |
| Quitman | 1,026 | 31.80% | 2,150 | 66.65% | 50 | 1.55% | -1,124 | -34.84% | 3,226 |
| Rankin | 50,895 | 72.03% | 18,847 | 26.67% | 913 | 1.29% | 32,048 | 45.36% | 70,655 |
| Scott | 6,285 | 58.56% | 4,330 | 40.34% | 118 | 1.10% | 1,955 | 18.21% | 10,733 |
| Sharkey | 688 | 31.52% | 1,465 | 67.11% | 30 | 1.37% | -777 | -35.59% | 2,183 |
| Simpson | 7,635 | 64.62% | 4,037 | 34.17% | 143 | 1.21% | 3,598 | 30.45% | 11,815 |
| Smith | 6,458 | 77.55% | 1,791 | 21.51% | 78 | 0.94% | 4,667 | 56.05% | 8,327 |
| Stone | 5,964 | 75.70% | 1,802 | 22.87% | 112 | 1.42% | 4,162 | 52.83% | 7,878 |
| Sunflower | 2,799 | 28.91% | 6,781 | 70.04% | 101 | 1.04% | -3,982 | -41.13% | 9,681 |
| Tallahatchie | 2,488 | 43.76% | 3,105 | 54.62% | 92 | 1.62% | -617 | -10.85% | 5,685 |
| Tate | 8,707 | 66.50% | 4,183 | 31.95% | 203 | 1.55% | 4,524 | 34.55% | 13,093 |
| Tippah | 8,054 | 79.73% | 1,937 | 19.17% | 111 | 1.10% | 6,117 | 60.55% | 10,102 |
| Tishomingo | 7,933 | 86.81% | 1,059 | 11.59% | 146 | 1.60% | 6,874 | 75.22% | 9,138 |
| Tunica | 926 | 26.00% | 2,580 | 72.43% | 56 | 1.57% | -1,654 | -46.43% | 3,562 |
| Union | 10,373 | 81.79% | 2,160 | 17.03% | 150 | 1.18% | 8,213 | 64.76% | 12,683 |
| Walthall | 4,220 | 59.28% | 2,835 | 39.82% | 64 | 0.90% | 1,385 | 19.45% | 7,119 |
| Warren | 10,365 | 49.23% | 10,442 | 49.60% | 246 | 1.17% | -77 | -0.37% | 21,053 |
| Washington | 5,300 | 29.43% | 12,503 | 69.43% | 205 | 1.14% | -7,203 | -40.00% | 18,008 |
| Wayne | 6,307 | 62.72% | 3,624 | 36.04% | 125 | 1.24% | 2,683 | 26.68% | 10,056 |
| Webster | 4,291 | 79.54% | 1,043 | 19.33% | 61 | 1.13% | 3,248 | 60.20% | 5,395 |
| Wilkinson | 1,324 | 32.08% | 2,749 | 66.61% | 54 | 1.31% | -1,425 | -34.53% | 4,127 |
| Winston | 5,112 | 55.35% | 4,040 | 43.74% | 84 | 0.91% | 1,072 | 11.61% | 9,236 |
| Yalobusha | 3,671 | 56.17% | 2,785 | 42.62% | 79 | 1.21% | 886 | 13.56% | 6,535 |
| Yazoo | 4,832 | 46.30% | 5,496 | 52.66% | 108 | 1.03% | -664 | -6.36% | 10,436 |
| Totals | 756,764 | 57.60% | 539,398 | 41.06% | 17,597 | 1.34% | 217,366 | 16.55% | 1,313,759 |

Counties that flipped from Republican to Democratic

- Warren (largest city: Vicksburg)

==== By congressional district ====
Trump won three of four congressional districts.

| District | Trump | Biden | Representative |
|---|---|---|---|
| 1st | 65% | 34% | Trent Kelly |
| 2nd | 35% | 64% | Bennie Thompson |
| 3rd | 60% | 39% | Michael Guest |
| 4th | 68% | 30% | Steven Palazzo |

== Analysis ==
Mississippi, a conservative state in the Deep South and greater Bible Belt, has not been won by a Democrat since fellow Southerner Jimmy Carter in 1976. Trump comfortably carried the state on election day by a 16.54% margin.

Despite Biden's loss statewide, he did manage to flip Warren County, home to Vicksburg, which had voted Democratic in 2012, but flipped back to the GOP column in 2016. In other elections, Republican Cindy Hyde-Smith defeated Democrat Mike Espy by almost 10 points in the simultaneous senatorial race. Although Hyde-Smith underperformed Trump, she still won by a somewhat comfortable margin.

In referendums, a statewide referendum to approve a new flag after their controversial previous one, which contained the Confederate battle ensign, was relinquished. The new alternative passed with over 71% of the vote. Medical marijuana was approved in the state with more than 61% of voters supporting the legalization. The less restrictive of the medical marijuana bills, Initiative 65, passed with over 57% selecting the less restrictive of two options to legalize medical marijuana. The state also voted to eliminate the electoral college system that had been in place to elect statewide officials. Over 74% of Mississippians voted to remove the provision that a candidate must receive the support of a majority of Mississippi Legislature House districts.

This is the fourth consecutive election in which Mississippi voted more Democratic than each of its neighboring states, due to African Americans comprising 37.94% of its population. Per exit polls by the Associated Press, Trump's strength in Mississippi came from White born-again/Evangelical Christians, of whom 89% supported Trump. 57% of voters believed abortion should be illegal in all or most cases, and these voters backed Trump 83%–16%. As is the case in many Southern states, there was a stark racial divide in voting for this election: 82% of White Mississippians supported Trump, while 93% of Black Mississippians supported Biden.

== See also ==
- United States presidential elections in Mississippi
- 2020 United States presidential election
- 2020 Democratic Party presidential primaries
- 2020 Republican Party presidential primaries
- 2020 United States elections

== Notes ==
Partisan clients
