= United States Senate Appropriations Subcommittee on Homeland Security =

U.S. Senate Appropriations Subcommittee on Homeland Security is one of twelve subcommittees of the U.S. Senate Committee on Appropriations. It was formally established in 2003 in response to the terrorist attacks of September 11, 2001 to oversee national security programs and the newly created Department of Homeland Security. The United States Senate Committee on Appropriations has joint jurisdiction with the United States House Committee on Appropriations over all appropriations bills in the United States Congress. Each committee has 12 matching subcommittees, each of which is tasked with working on one of the twelve annual regular appropriations bills.

== Appropriations process ==
Traditionally, after a federal budget for the upcoming fiscal year has been passed, the appropriations subcommittees receive information about what the budget sets as their spending ceilings. This is called "302(b) allocations" after section 302(b) of the Congressional Budget Act of 1974. That amount is separated into smaller amounts for each of the twelve Subcommittees. The federal budget does not become law and is not signed by the President. Instead, it is guide for the House and the Senate in making appropriations and tax decisions. However, no budget is required and each chamber has procedures in place for what to do without one. The House and Senate now consider appropriations bills simultaneously, although originally the House went first. The House Committee on Appropriations usually reports the appropriations bills in May and June and the Senate in June. Any differences between appropriations bills passed by the House and the Senate are resolved in the fall.

== Appropriations bills ==
An appropriations bill is a bill that appropriates (gives to, sets aside for) money to specific federal government departments, agencies, and programs. The money provides funding for operations, personnel, equipment, and activities. Regular appropriations bills are passed annually, with the funding they provide covering one fiscal year. The fiscal year is the accounting period of the federal government, which runs from October 1 to September 30 of the following year.

There are three types of appropriations bills: regular appropriations bills, continuing resolutions, and supplemental appropriations bills. Regular appropriations bills are the twelve standard bills that cover the funding for the federal government for one fiscal year and that are supposed to be enacted into law by October 1. If Congress has not enacted the regular appropriations bills by the time, it can pass a continuing resolution, which continues the pre-existing appropriations at the same levels as the previous fiscal year (or with minor modifications) for a set amount of time. The third type of appropriations bills are supplemental appropriations bills, which add additional funding above and beyond what was originally appropriated at the beginning of the fiscal year. Supplemental appropriations bills can be used for things like disaster relief.

Appropriations bills are one part of a larger United States budget and spending process. They are preceded in that process by the president's budget proposal, congressional budget resolutions, and the 302(b) allocation. Article One of the United States Constitution, section 9, clause 7, states that "No money shall be drawn from the Treasury, but in Consequence of Appropriations made by Law..." This is what gives Congress the power to make these appropriations. The President, however, still has the power to veto appropriations bills.

== Jurisdiction ==
The subcommittee is responsible for the Department of Homeland Security and its related agencies, including the Federal Emergency Management Agency, the Transportation Security Administration, U.S. Immigration and Customs Enforcement, U.S. Customs and Border Protection, U.S. Citizenship and Immigration Services, the U.S. Secret Service, and the United States Coast Guard. The subcommittee also provides funding for state and local preparedness efforts.

== Members, 119th Congress ==
Majority	Minority
Katie Britt, Alabama, Chair; Lisa Murkowski, Alaska; Shelley Moore Capito, West Virginia; John Kennedy, Louisiana; Cindy Hyde-Smith, Mississippi; Bill Hagerty, Tennessee	Chris Murphy, Connecticut, Ranking Member; Patty Murray, Washington; Jeanne Shaheen, New Hampshire; Gary Peters, Michigan; Chris Van Hollen, Maryland
Ex officio
Susan Collins, Maine	

== Historical subcommittee rosters ==
=== 116th Congress ===
Majority	Minority
Shelley Moore Capito, West Virginia, Chair; Richard Shelby, Alabama; Lisa Murkowski, Alaska; John Hoeven, North Dakota; John Kennedy, Louisiana; James Lankford, Oklahoma; Cindy Hyde-Smith, Mississippi	Jon Tester, Montana, Ranking Member; Jeanne Shaheen, New Hampshire; Patrick Leahy, Vermont; Patty Murray, Washington; Tammy Baldwin, Wisconsin; Joe Manchin, West Virginia
Ex officio

=== 117th Congress ===
Majority	Minority
Chris Murphy, Connecticut, Chair; Jon Tester, Montana; Jeanne Shaheen, New Hampshire; Patrick Leahy, Vermont; Patty Murray, Washington; Tammy Baldwin, Wisconsin	Shelley Moore Capito, West Virginia, Ranking Member; Richard Shelby, Alabama; Lisa Murkowski, Alaska; John Hoeven, North Dakota; John Kennedy, Louisiana; Cindy Hyde-Smith, Mississippi
Ex officio

=== 118th Congress ===
Majority	Minority
Chris Murphy, Connecticut, Chair; Jon Tester, Montana; Jeanne Shaheen, New Hampshire; Gary Peters, Michigan; Patty Murray, Washington; Tammy Baldwin, Wisconsin	Katie Britt, Alabama, Ranking Member; Shelley Moore Capito, West Virginia; Lisa Murkowski, Alaska; John Kennedy, Louisiana; Cindy Hyde-Smith, Mississippi
Ex officio
	Susan Collins, Maine

== See also ==
- United States House Appropriations Subcommittee on Homeland Security
