= United States Senate Committee on Appropriations =

Standing committee of the United States Senate

Senate Appropriations Committee
Standing committee
- Active United States Senate; 119th Congress

History
- Formed: March 6, 1867

Leadership
- Chair: Susan Collins (R); Since January 3, 2025
- Vice Chair: Patty Murray (D); Since January 3, 2025

Structure
- Seats: 29 members
- Political parties: Majority (15): Republican (15); Minority (14): Democratic (14)

Jurisdiction
- Policy areas: Appropriations bills, Discretionary spending, Rescission bills
- Oversight authority: Federal government of the United States
- House counterpart: House Committee on Appropriations

Meeting place
- 304 Dirksen Senate Office Building; Washington, D.C., S-128 United States Capitol; Washington, D.C.

Website
- www.appropriations.senate.gov

The United States Senate Committee on Appropriations, informally known as the Senate Appropriations Committee, is a standing committee of the United States Senate. It has jurisdiction over all discretionary spending legislation in the Senate.

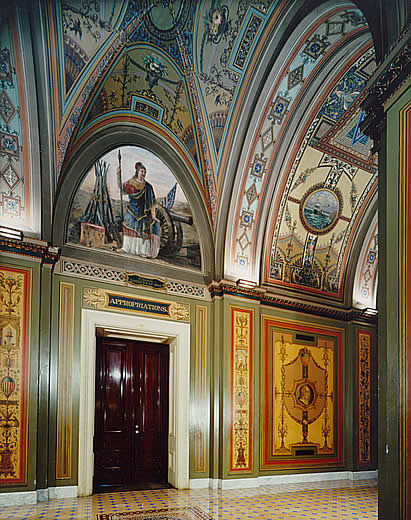
The entrance to the Appropriations Committee Suite in the United States Capitol

The Senate Appropriations Committee is the largest committee in the U.S. Senate, with 30 members in the 117th Congress. Its role is defined by the U.S. Constitution, which requires "appropriations made by law" prior to the expenditure of any money from the Treasury, and the committee is therefore one of the most powerful committees in the Senate. The committee was first organized on March 6, 1867, when power over appropriations was taken out of the hands of the Finance Committee.

The chair of the Appropriations Committee has enormous power to bring home special projects (sometimes referred to as "pork barrel spending") for their state as well as having the final say on other senators' appropriation requests. For example, in fiscal year 2005, per capita federal spending in Alaska, the home state of Chair Ted Stevens, was $12,000, double the national average. Alaska has 11,772 special earmarked projects for a combined cost of $15,780,623,000. This represents about four percent of the overall spending in the $388 billion Consolidated Appropriations Act of 2005 passed by Congress.

From 2001 to 2021, every Senate Majority Leader was a previous or concurrently serving member of the Appropriations Committee: Tom Daschle (committee member, 1991–1999; majority leader, 2001–2003), Bill Frist (committee member, 1995–2002; majority leader, 2003–2007), Harry Reid (committee member, 1989–2006; majority leader, 2007–2015), and Mitch McConnell (current committee member; majority leader, 2015–2021).

== Appropriations process ==
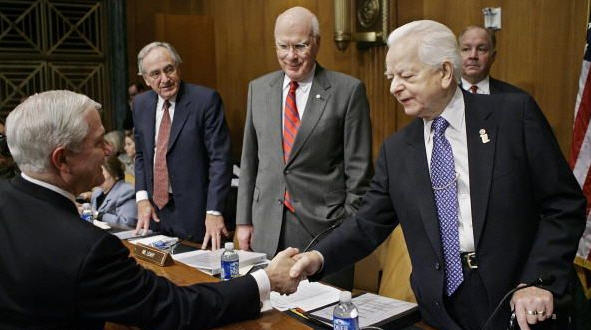
Former Committee Chair Robert Byrd (D-WV, far right) shakes hands with Secretary of Defense Robert Gates while Sen. Patrick Leahy (D-VT, center right) and Sen. Tom Harkin (D-IA) look on. The hearing was held to discuss further funding for the War in Iraq.

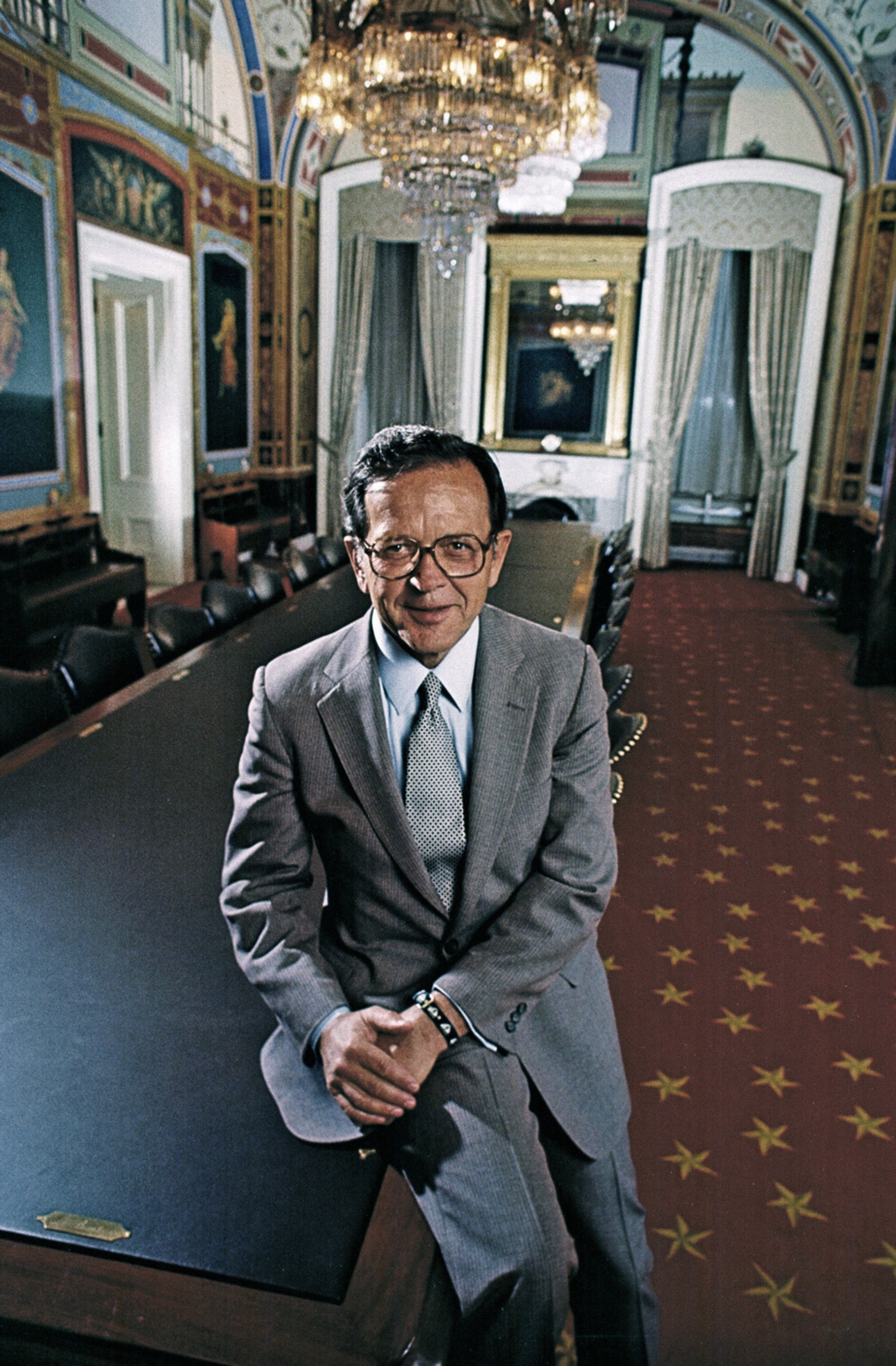
Ted Stevens was especially noted for his ability to use his Appropriations chair to bring home federal dollars for the state of Alaska.

The federal budget is divided into two main categories: discretionary spending and mandatory spending. Each appropriations subcommittee develops a draft appropriations bill covering each agency under its jurisdiction based on the Congressional Budget Resolution, which is drafted by an analogous Senate Budget committee. Each subcommittee must adhere to the spending limits set by the budget resolution and allocations set by the full Appropriations Committee, though the full Senate may vote to waive those limits if 60 senators vote to do so. The committee also reviews supplemental spending bills (covering unforeseen or emergency expenses not previously budgeted).

Each appropriations bill must be passed by both houses of Congress and signed by the president prior to the start of the federal fiscal year, October 1. If that target is not met, as has been common in recent years, the committee drafts a continuing resolution, which is then approved by Congress and signed by the president to keep the federal government operating until the individual bills are approved.

== Jurisdiction ==
In accordance of Rule XXV of the United States Senate, all proposed legislation, messages, petitions, memorials, and other matters relating to the following subjects is referred to the Senate Committee on Appropriations:

1. Appropriation of the revenue for the support of the Government, except as provided in subparagraph (e);
2. Rescission of appropriations contained in appropriation Acts (referred to in section 105 of title 1, United States Code);
3. The amount of new spending authority described in section 401(c)(2) (A) and (B) of the Congressional Budget Act of 1974 which is to be effective for a fiscal year; and,
4. New spending authority described in section 401(c)(2)(C) of the Congressional Budget Act of 1974 provided in bills and resolutions referred to the committee under section 401(b)(2) of that Act (but subject to the provisions of section 401(b)(3) of that Act).

Likewise, Article I, Section 9, Clause 7 of the United States Constitution, clearly vesting the power of the purse in Congress, states: "No Money shall be drawn from the Treasury, but in Consequence of Appropriations made by Law...and a regular Statement and Account of the Receipts and expenditures of all public Money shall be published from time to time." This clause is the foundation for the congressional appropriations process and the fundamental source of the Senate Appropriations Committee's institutional power – as is the same with its counterpart in the lower house. In other words, Article I, Section 9, Clause 7 of the United States Constitution charges the United States Congress with the legislative duty of controlling government spending separate from the executive branch of government – a significant check and balance in the American constitutional system.

== Members, 119th Congress ==
Majority	Minority
Susan Collins, Maine, Chair; Mitch McConnell, Kentucky; Lisa Murkowski, Alaska; Jerry Moran, Kansas; John Hoeven, North Dakota; John Boozman, Arkansas; Shelley Moore Capito, West Virginia; John Kennedy, Louisiana; Cindy Hyde-Smith, Mississippi; Bill Hagerty, Tennessee; Katie Britt, Alabama; Deb Fischer, Nebraska; Mike Rounds, South Dakota; Jon Husted, Ohio; Darline Graham, South Carolina	Patty Murray, Washington, Vice Chair; Dick Durbin, Illinois; Jack Reed, Rhode Island; Jeanne Shaheen, New Hampshire; Jeff Merkley, Oregon; Chris Coons, Delaware; Brian Schatz, Hawaii; Tammy Baldwin, Wisconsin; Chris Murphy, Connecticut; Chris Van Hollen, Maryland; Martin Heinrich, New Mexico; Gary Peters, Michigan; Kirsten Gillibrand, New York; Jon Ossoff, Georgia

== Subcommittees ==
Subcommittee	Chair	Ranking Member
Agriculture, Rural Development, Food and Drug Administration, and Related Agencies	John Hoeven (R-ND)	Jeanne Shaheen (D-NH)
Commerce, Justice, Science, and Related Agencies	Jerry Moran (R-KS)	Chris Van Hollen (D-MD)
Defense	Mitch McConnell (R-KY)	Chris Coons (D-DE)
Energy and Water Development	John Kennedy (R-LA)	Patty Murray (D-WA)
Financial Services and General Government	Bill Hagerty (R-TN)	Jack Reed (D-RI)
Homeland Security	Katie Britt (R-AL)	Chris Murphy (D-CT)
Interior, Environment, and Related Agencies	Lisa Murkowski (R-AK)	Jeff Merkley (D-OR)
Labor, Health and Human Services, Education, and Related Agencies	Shelley Moore Capito (R-WV)	Tammy Baldwin (D-WI)
Legislative Branch	Markwayne Mullin (R-OK) (until March 23, 2026); Deb Fischer (R-NE) (from March 27, 2026)	Martin Heinrich (D-NM)
Military Construction, Veterans Affairs, and Related Agencies	John Boozman (R-AR)	Jon Ossoff (D-GA)
State, Foreign Operations, and Related Programs	Lindsey Graham (R-SC) (until July 11, 2026); Susan Collins (R-ME) (interim from July 22, 2026)	Brian Schatz (D-HI)
Transportation, Housing and Urban Development, and Related Agencies	Cindy Hyde-Smith (R-MS)	Kirsten Gillibrand (D-NY)

=== Committee reorganization during the 110th Congress ===
At the outset of the 110th Congress, Chair Robert Byrd and Chair Dave Obey, his counterpart on the House Appropriations Committee, developed a committee reorganization plan that provided for common subcommittee structures between both houses, a move that both the chairs hope will allow Congress to "complete action on each of the government funding on time for the first time since 1994." The subcommittees were last overhauled between the 107th and 108th Congresses, after the creation of the Subcommittee on Homeland Security and again during the 109th Congress, when the number of subcommittees was reduced from 13 to 12.

A key part of the new subcommittee organization was the establishment of a new Subcommittee on Financial Services and General Government, which consolidates funding for the Treasury Department, the United States federal judiciary, and the District of Columbia. These functions were previously handled by two separate Senate subcommittees.

== Committee leadership ==
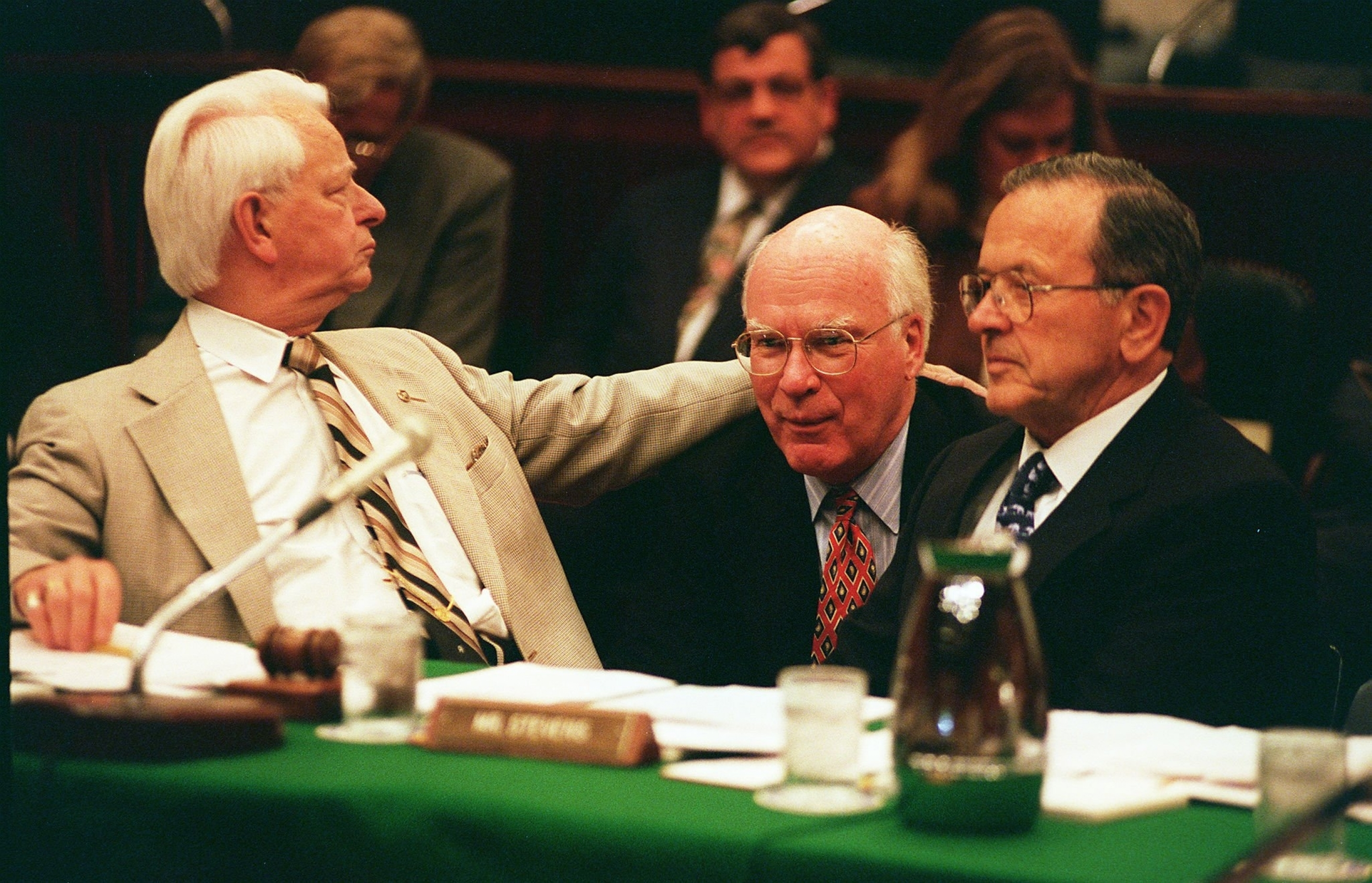
Vice Chair Robert Byrd, Patrick Leahy and Chair Ted Stevens meeting for FY98 Appropriations in 1997

Former chairs and vice chairs are listed below.

Chairs
Name	Party	State	Start	End
Lot Morrill	Republican	ME	1867	1869
William Fessenden	Republican	ME	1869	
Lot Morrill	Republican	ME	1869	1871
Cornelius Cole	Republican	CA	1871	1873
Lot Morrill	Republican	ME	1873	1876
William Windom	Republican	MN	1876	1879
Henry Davis	Democratic	WV	1879	1881
William Allison	Republican	IA	1881	1893
Francis Cockrell	Democratic	MO	1893	1895
William Allison	Republican	IA	1895	1908
Eugene Hale	Republican	ME	1908	1911
Francis Warren	Republican	WY	1911	1913
Thomas Martin	Democratic	VA	1913	1919
Francis Warren	Republican	WY	1919	1929
Wesley Jones	Republican	WA	1929	1932
Frederick Hale	Republican	ME	1932	1933
Carter Glass	Democratic	VA	1933	1946
Kenneth McKellar	Democratic	TN	1946	1947
Styles Bridges	Republican	NH	1947	1949
Kenneth McKellar	Democratic	TN	1949	1953
Styles Bridges	Republican	NH	1953	1955
Carl Hayden	Democratic	AZ	1955	1969
Richard Russell	Democratic	GA	1969	1971
Allen Ellender	Democratic	LA	1971	1972
John McClellan	Democratic	AR	1972	1977
Warren Magnuson	Democratic	WA	1977	1981
Mark Hatfield	Republican	OR	1981	1987
John Stennis	Democratic	MS	1987	1989
Robert Byrd	Democratic	WV	1989	1995
Mark Hatfield	Republican	OR	1995	1997
Ted Stevens	Republican	AK	1997	2001
Robert Byrd	Democratic	WV	2001	
Ted Stevens	Republican	AK	2001	
Robert Byrd	Democratic	WV	2001	2003
Ted Stevens	Republican	AK	2003	2005
Thad Cochran	Republican	MS	2005	2007
Robert Byrd	Democratic	WV	2007	2009
Daniel Inouye	Democratic	HI	2009	2012
Barbara Mikulski	Democratic	MD	2012	2015
Thad Cochran	Republican	MS	2015	2018
Richard Shelby	Republican	AL	2018	2021
Patrick Leahy	Democratic	VT	2021	2023
Patty Murray	Democratic	WA	2023	2025
Susan Collins	Republican	ME	2025	present

Vice Chairs
Name	Party	State	Start	End
Cornelius Cole	Republican	CA	1867	1869
William Sprague	Republican	RI	1869	1871
William Windom	Republican	MN	1871	1873
William Allison	Republican	IA	1873	1875
Stephen Dorsey	Democratic	AR	1875	1877
Henry Davis	Democratic	WV	1877	1879
William Windom	Republican	MN	1879	1881
Henry Davis	Democratic	WV	1881	1883
James Beck	Democratic	KY	1883	1889
Francis Cockrell	Democratic	MO	1889	1893
William Allison	Republican	IA	1893	1895
Francis Cockrell	Democratic	MO	1895	1905
Henry Teller	Democratic	CO	1905	1909
Benjamin Tillman	Democratic	SC	1909	1913
Francis Warren	Republican	WY	1913	1919
Lee Overman	Democratic	NC	1919	1930
William Harris	Democratic	GA	1931	1932
Carter Glass	Democratic	VA	1932	1933
Frederick Hale	Republican	ME	1933	1941
Gerald Nye	Republican	ND	1941	1945
Styles Bridges	Republican	NH	1945	1947
Kenneth McKellar	Democratic	TN	1947	1949
Styles Bridges	Republican	NH	1949	1953
Carl Hayden	Democratic	AZ	1953	1955
Styles Bridges	Republican	NH	1955	1961
Leverett Saltonstall	Republican	MA	1961	1967
Milton Young	Republican	ND	1967	1981
William Proxmire	Democratic	WI	1981	1983
John Stennis	Democratic	MS	1983	1987
Mark Hatfield	Republican	OR	1987	1995
Robert Byrd	Democratic	WV	1995	2001
Ted Stevens	Republican	AK	2001	
Robert Byrd	Democratic	WV	2001	
Ted Stevens	Republican	AK	2001	2003
Robert Byrd	Democratic	WV	2003	2007
Thad Cochran	Republican	MS	2007	2013
Richard Shelby	Republican	AL	2013	2015
Barbara Mikulski	Democratic	MD	2015	2017
Patrick Leahy	Democratic	VT	2017	2021
Richard Shelby	Republican	AL	2021	2023
Susan Collins	Republican	ME	2023	2025
Patty Murray	Democratic	WA	2025	present

== Historical membership rosters ==
=== 118th Congress ===
Majority	Minority
Patty Murray, Washington, Chair; Dianne Feinstein, California (until September 29, 2023); Dick Durbin, Illinois; Jack Reed, Rhode Island; Jon Tester, Montana; Jeanne Shaheen, New Hampshire; Jeff Merkley, Oregon; Chris Coons, Delaware; Brian Schatz, Hawaii; Tammy Baldwin, Wisconsin; Chris Murphy, Connecticut; Joe Manchin, West Virginia; Chris Van Hollen, Maryland; Martin Heinrich, New Mexico; Gary Peters, Michigan; Kyrsten Sinema, Arizona (from October 17, 2023)	Susan Collins, Maine, Vice Chair; Mitch McConnell, Kentucky; Lisa Murkowski, Alaska; Lindsey Graham, South Carolina; Jerry Moran, Kansas; John Hoeven, North Dakota; John Boozman, Arkansas; Shelley Moore Capito, West Virginia; John Kennedy, Louisiana; Cindy Hyde-Smith, Mississippi; Bill Hagerty, Tennessee; Katie Britt, Alabama; Marco Rubio, Florida; Deb Fischer, Nebraska

=== 117th Congress ===
Majority	Minority
Patrick Leahy, Vermont, Chair; Patty Murray, Washington; Dianne Feinstein, California; Dick Durbin, Illinois; Jack Reed, Rhode Island; Jon Tester, Montana; Jeanne Shaheen, New Hampshire; Jeff Merkley, Oregon; Chris Coons, Delaware; Brian Schatz, Hawaii; Tammy Baldwin, Wisconsin; Chris Murphy, Connecticut; Joe Manchin, West Virginia; Chris Van Hollen, Maryland; Martin Heinrich, New Mexico	Richard Shelby, Alabama, Vice Chair; Mitch McConnell, Kentucky; Susan Collins, Maine; Lisa Murkowski, Alaska; Lindsey Graham, South Carolina; Roy Blunt, Missouri; Jerry Moran, Kansas; John Hoeven, North Dakota; John Boozman, Arkansas; Shelley Moore Capito, West Virginia; John Kennedy, Louisiana; Cindy Hyde-Smith, Mississippi; Mike Braun, Indiana; Marco Rubio, Florida; Bill Hagerty, Tennessee

=== 116th Congress ===
Majority	Minority
Richard Shelby, Alabama, Chair; Mitch McConnell, Kentucky; Lamar Alexander, Tennessee; Susan Collins, Maine; Lisa Murkowski, Alaska; Lindsey Graham, South Carolina; Roy Blunt, Missouri; Jerry Moran. Kansas; John Hoeven, North Dakota; John Boozman, Arkansas; Shelley Moore Capito, West Virginia; John Kennedy, Louisiana; Cindy Hyde-Smith, Mississippi; Steve Daines, Montana; Marco Rubio, Florida; James Lankford, Oklahoma	Patrick Leahy, Vermont, Vice Chair; Patty Murray, Washington; Dianne Feinstein, California; Dick Durbin, Illinois; Jack Reed, Rhode Island; Jon Tester, Montana; Tom Udall, New Mexico; Jeanne Shaheen, New Hampshire; Jeff Merkley, Oregon; Chris Coons, Delaware; Brian Schatz, Hawaii; Tammy Baldwin, Wisconsin; Chris Murphy, Connecticut; Joe Manchin, West Virginia; Chris Van Hollen, Maryland

=== 115th Congress ===
Majority	Minority
Richard Shelby, Alabama, Chair (from April 10, 2018); Thad Cochran, Mississippi, Chair (until April 1, 2018); Mitch McConnell, Kentucky; Lamar Alexander, Tennessee; Susan Collins, Maine; Lisa Murkowski, Alaska; Lindsey Graham, South Carolina; Roy Blunt, Missouri; Jerry Moran, Kansas; John Hoeven, North Dakota; John Boozman, Arkansas; Shelley Moore Capito, West Virginia; James Lankford, Oklahoma; Steve Daines, Montana; John Kennedy, Louisiana; Marco Rubio, Florida; Cindy Hyde-Smith, Mississippi (from April 10, 2018)	Patrick Leahy, Vermont, Vice Chair; Patty Murray, Washington; Dianne Feinstein, California; Dick Durbin, Illinois; Jack Reed, Rhode Island; Jon Tester, Montana; Tom Udall, New Mexico; Jeanne Shaheen, New Hampshire; Jeff Merkley, Oregon; Chris Coons, Delaware; Brian Schatz, Hawaii; Tammy Baldwin, Wisconsin; Chris Murphy, Connecticut; Joe Manchin, West Virginia; Chris Van Hollen, Maryland

Source :"U.S. Senate: Committee on Appropriations". Senate.gov.

=== 114th Congress ===
Majority	Minority
Thad Cochran, Mississippi, Chair; Mitch McConnell, Kentucky; Richard Shelby, Alabama; Lamar Alexander, Tennessee; Susan Collins, Maine; Lisa Murkowski, Alaska; Lindsey Graham, South Carolina; Mark Kirk, Illinois; Roy Blunt, Missouri; Jerry Moran, Kansas; John Hoeven, North Dakota; John Boozman, Arkansas; Shelley Moore Capito, West Virginia; Bill Cassidy, Louisiana; James Lankford, Oklahoma; Steve Daines, Montana	Barbara Mikulski, Maryland, Vice Chair; Patrick Leahy, Vermont; Patty Murray, Washington; Dianne Feinstein, California; Dick Durbin, Illinois; Jack Reed, Rhode Island; Jon Tester, Montana; Tom Udall, New Mexico; Jeanne Shaheen, New Hampshire; Jeff Merkley, Oregon; Chris Coons, Delaware; Brian Schatz, Hawaii; Tammy Baldwin, Wisconsin; Chris Murphy, Connecticut

Source: 2013 Congressional Record, Vol. 159, Page S296

=== 113th Congress ===
Majority	Minority
Barbara Mikulski, Maryland, Chair; Patrick Leahy, Vermont; Tom Harkin, Iowa; Patty Murray, Washington; Dianne Feinstein, California; Dick Durbin, Illinois; Tim Johnson, South Dakota; Mary Landrieu, Louisiana; Jack Reed, Rhode Island; Frank Lautenberg, New Jersey (died June 3, 2013); Mark Pryor, Arkansas; Jon Tester, Montana; Jeanne Shaheen, New Hampshire; Jeff Merkley, Oregon; Mark Begich, Alaska; Chris Coons, Delaware (since June 2013)	Richard Shelby, Alabama, Vice Chair; Thad Cochran, Mississippi; Mitch McConnell, Kentucky; Lamar Alexander, Tennessee; Susan Collins, Maine; Lisa Murkowski, Alaska; Lindsey Graham, South Carolina; Mark Kirk, Illinois; Daniel Coats, Indiana; Roy Blunt, Missouri; Jerry Moran, Kansas; John Hoeven, North Dakota; Mike Johanns, Nebraska; John Boozman, Arkansas

=== 112th Congress ===
Majority	Minority
Daniel Inouye, Hawaii, Chair (died December 17, 2012); Patrick Leahy, Vermont; Tom Harkin, Iowa; Barbara Mikulski, Maryland; Patty Murray, Washington; Dianne Feinstein, California; Dick Durbin, Illinois; Tim Johnson, South Dakota; Mary Landrieu, Louisiana; Jack Reed, Rhode Island; Frank Lautenberg, New Jersey; Ben Nelson, Nebraska; Mark Pryor, Arkansas; Jon Tester, Montana; Sherrod Brown, Ohio	Thad Cochran, Mississippi, Vice Chair; Mitch McConnell, Kentucky; Richard Shelby, Alabama; Kay Bailey Hutchison, Texas; Lamar Alexander, Tennessee; Susan Collins, Maine; Lisa Murkowski, Alaska; Lindsey Graham, South Carolina; Mark Kirk, Illinois; Daniel Coats, Indiana; Roy Blunt, Missouri; Jerry Moran, Kansas; John Hoeven, North Dakota; Ron Johnson, Wisconsin

=== 111th Congress ===
Majority	Minority
Daniel Inouye, Hawaii, Chair; Robert Byrd, West Virginia; Patrick Leahy, Vermont; Tom Harkin, Iowa; Barbara Mikulski, Maryland; Herb Kohl, Wisconsin; Patty Murray, Washington; Byron Dorgan, North Dakota; Dianne Feinstein, California; Dick Durbin, Illinois; Tim Johnson, South Dakota; Mary Landrieu, Louisiana; Jack Reed, Rhode Island; Frank Lautenberg, New Jersey; Ben Nelson, Nebraska; Mark Pryor, Arkansas; Jon Tester, Montana; Arlen Specter, Pennsylvania	Thad Cochran, Mississippi, Vice Chair; Kit Bond, Missouri; Mitch McConnell, Kentucky; Richard Shelby, Alabama; Judd Gregg, New Hampshire; Bob Bennet, Utah; Kay Bailey Hutchison, Texas; Sam Brownback, Kansas; Lamar Alexander, Tennessee; Susan Collins, Maine; George Voinovich, Ohio; Lisa Murkowski, Alaska

=== 110th Congress ===
Majority	Minority
Robert Byrd, West Virginia, Chair; Daniel Inouye, Hawaii; Patrick Leahy, Vermont; Tom Harkin, Iowa; Barbara Mikulski, Maryland; Herb Kohl, Wisconsin; Patty Murray, Washington; Byron Dorgan, North Dakota; Dianne Feinstein, California; Dick Durbin, Illinois; Tim Johnson, South Dakota; Mary Landrieu, Louisiana; Jack Reed, Rhode Island; Frank Lautenberg, New Jersey; Ben Nelson, Nebraska	Thad Cochran, Mississippi, Vice Chair; Ted Stevens, Alaska; Arlen Specter, Pennsylvania; Pete Domenici, New Mexico; Kit Bond, Missouri; Mitch McConnell, Kentucky; Richard Shelby, Alabama; Judd Gregg, New Hampshire; Bob Bennet, Utah; Larry Craig, Idaho; Kay Bailey Hutchison, Texas; Sam Brownback, Kansas; Wayne Allard, Colorado; Lamar Alexander, Tennessee

=== 109th Congress ===
Majority	Minority
Thad Cochran, Mississippi, Chair; Ted Stevens, Alaska; Arlen Specter, Pennsylvania; Pete Domenici, New Mexico; Kit Bond, Missouri; Mitch McConnell, Kentucky; Conrad Burns, Montana; Richard Shelby, Alabama; Judd Gregg, New Hampshire; Bob Bennet, Utah; Larry Craig, Idaho; Kay Bailey Hutchison, Texas; Mike DeWine, Ohio; Sam Brownback, Kansas; Wayne Allard, Colorado	Robert Byrd, West Virginia, Vice Chair; Daniel Inouye, Hawaii; Patrick Leahy, Vermont; Tom Harkin, Iowa; Barbara Mikulski, Maryland; Herb Kohl, Wisconsin; Patty Murray, Washington; Byron Dorgan, North Dakota; Dianne Feinstein, California; Dick Durbin, Illinois; Tim Johnson, South Dakota; Mary Landrieu, Louisiana

== See also ==
- List of United States Senate committees
- United States budget process
- U.S. House Committee on Appropriations
- U.S. Senate Appropriations Subcommittee on Labor, Health and Human Services, Education, and Related Agencies
- U.S. Senate Budget Committee
- Appropriations bill (United States)
- 2015 United States federal appropriations
