= 2020 United States Senate election in Mississippi =

- November 3, 2020
- Registered: 1,985,928
- Turnout: 1,311,354; 66.0% ▲

Nominee	Cindy Hyde-Smith	Mike Espy
Party	Republican	Democratic
Popular vote	709,511	578,691
Percentage	54.11%	44.13%
- Hyde-Smith: 40–50% 50–60% 60–70% 70–80% 80–90% >90% Espy: 40–50% 50–60% 60–70% 70–80% 80–90% >90% Tie: 50% No data
U.S. senator before election
Cindy Hyde-Smith
Republican
Elected U.S. Senator
Cindy Hyde-Smith
Republican

The 2020 United States Senate election in Mississippi was held on November 3, 2020, to elect a member of the United States Senate to represent the State of Mississippi, concurrently with the 2020 U.S. presidential election, as well as other elections to the United States Senate, elections to the United States House of Representatives and various state and local elections.

Incumbent Republican Senator Cindy Hyde-Smith won reelection to a full term against Democratic nominee Mike Espy, in a rematch of the 2018 special election. Despite being outspent nearly four to one, Hyde-Smith won by a ten-point margin; however, she underperformed Republican president Donald Trump in the concurrent presidential election by around 6 points.

== Republican primary ==
=== Candidates ===
==== Nominee ====
- Cindy Hyde-Smith, incumbent U.S. senator

==== Declined ====
- Gerard Gibert, businessman and vice chairman of the Mississippi Lottery Board
- Chris McDaniel, incumbent state senator and candidate for U.S. Senate in 2014 and 2018
- Josh Randle, former president of the Miss America Organization

=== Endorsements ===
Cindy Hyde-Smith

Organizations

- Maggie's List

=== Results ===
Republican primary results
Party	Candidate	Votes	%
Republican	Cindy Hyde-Smith (incumbent)	235,463	100.0%
Total votes		235,463	100.0%

== Democratic primary ==
=== Candidates ===
==== Nominee ====
- Mike Espy, former United States Secretary of Agriculture, former U.S. representative for Mississippi's 2nd congressional district, and nominee for U.S. Senate in 2018

==== Eliminated in primary ====
- Tobey Bartee, former military intelligence officer and candidate for U.S. Senate in 2018
- Jensen Bohren, teacher, candidate for U.S. Senate in 2018

==== Declined ====
- J. P. Hughes Jr., state representative and candidate for lieutenant governor of Mississippi in 2019
- Brandon Presley, member of the Mississippi Public Service Commission

=== Endorsements ===
Mike Espy

Organizations

- DSCC
- Flip the Senate
- Human Rights Campaign

=== Results ===
Results by county Espy: ≥90%; 80–90%; 70–80%; Bartee: 50–60%

Democratic primary results
Party	Candidate	Votes	%
Democratic	Mike Espy	250,496	93.12%
Democratic	Tobey Bartee	11,148	4.14%
Democratic	Jensen Bohren	7,345	2.74%
Total votes		268,989	100.0%

== Other candidates ==
=== Libertarian Party ===
==== Nominee ====
- Jimmy Edwards

== General election ==
=== Predictions ===
Source	Ranking	As of
The Cook Political Report	Likely R	October 29, 2020
Inside Elections	Safe R	October 28, 2020
Sabato's Crystal Ball	Likely R	November 2, 2020
Daily Kos	Safe R	October 30, 2020
Politico	Likely R	November 2, 2020
RCP	Lean R	October 23, 2020
DDHQ	Likely R	November 3, 2020
538	Likely R	November 2, 2020
Economist	Likely R	November 2, 2020

=== Endorsements ===
Cindy Hyde-Smith (R)

Executive Branch officials

- Donald Trump, 45th president of the United States (2017-2021)

Organizations

- Campaign for Working Families
- Huck PAC
- NRA Political Victory Fund
- Susan B. Anthony List
- United States Chamber of Commerce
Mike Espy (D)

Executive Branch officials

- Joe Biden, 47th vice president of the United States (2009–2017), U.S. Senator from Delaware (1973–2009)
- Barack Obama, 44th president of the United States (2009–2017), U.S. Senator from Illinois (2005–2008)

U.S. senators

- Elizabeth Warren, senator from Massachusetts since 2013

U.S. representatives

- Bennie Thompson, representative from MS-2 since 1993

State officials

- Stacey Abrams, former minority leader of the Georgia House of Representatives

Notable individuals

- Andrew Yang, former 2020 Democratic presidential primary candidate

Organizations

- Center for Biological Diversity
- Congressional Black Caucus PAC
- Feminist Majority PAC

Unions

- Mississippi AFL-CIO
- National Education Association

=== Polling ===
View source data.

Poll source	Date(s) administered	Sample size	Margin of error	Cindy Hyde-Smith (R)	Mike Espy (D)	Other	Undecided
Data For Progress	October 27 – November 1, 2020	562 (LV)	± 4.1%	50%	47%	4% (Note: Edwards (L) with 3%; "Other candidate or write-in" with 1%)	–
Civiqs/Daily Kos	October 23–26, 2020	507 (LV)	± 5.3%	52%	44%	3% (Note: Edwards (L) with 2%; "Someone else" with 1%)	2%
The Progress Campaign (D)	October 23, 2020	– (V) (Note: Not yet released)	–	48%	43%	–	–
Tyson Group (R) (Note: Poll sponsored by the Consumer Energy Alliance, which is a pro-Keystone XL lobbying group.)	August 28–30, 2020	600 (LV)	± 4%	41%	40%	–	18%
Garin-Hart-Yang Research (D) (Note: Poll sponsored by Espy's campaign)	July 30 – August 9, 2020	600 (LV)	± 4.1%	47%	42%	3% (Note: "Third party" with 3%)	8%
Public Policy Polling (D) (Note: Poll conducted for the Mississippi Democratic Party.)	May 27–28, 2020	871 (V)	± 3.3%	49%	41%	–	10%
Impact Management Group (R)	May 4–7, 2020	606 (LV)	± 4.4%	58%	31%	3% (Note: Edwards (L) with 3%)	9% (Note: Includes "refused")
Tyson Group (R)	March 10–12, 2020	600 (LV)	–	54%	28%	–	18%
The Progress Campaign (D)	March 3–7, 2020	826 (V)	–	52%	44%	–	4% (Note: Listed as "other/undecided")
Mason-Dixon	February 26–28, 2020	625 (LV)	± 4.0%	53%	43%	–	4%
Chism Strategies	January 3–7, 2020	618 (LV)	± 3.9%	44%	36%	–	20%

=== Results ===
2020 United States Senate election in Mississippi
Party	Candidate	Votes	%	±%
Republican	Cindy Hyde-Smith (incumbent)	709,511	54.11%	+0.48%
Democratic	Mike Espy	578,691	44.13%	−2.24%
Libertarian	Jimmy Edwards	23,152	1.77%	N/A
Total votes		1,311,354	100.00%	N/A
Republican hold				

==== By county ====
By county

County	Cindy Hyde-Smith Republican		Mike Espy Democratic		Jimmy Edwards Libertarian		Margin		Total votes
County	#	%	#	%	#	%	#	%	Total votes
Adams	5,416	39.37	8,190	59.53	152	1.10	-2,774	-20.16	13,758
Alcorn	11,616	74.29	3,641	23.29	378	2.42	7,975	51.01	15,635
Amite	4,347	60.62	2,750	38.35	74	1.03	1,597	22.27	7,171
Attala	4,888	55.42	3,824	43.36	108	1.22	1,064	12.06	8,820
Benton	2,320	54.21	1,868	43.64	92	2.15	452	10.56	4,280
Bolivar	4,317	31.40	9,330	67.86	102	0.74	-5,013	-36.46	13,749
Calhoun	4,341	65.86	2,138	32.44	112	1.70	2,203	33.42	6,591
Carroll	3,716	64.93	1,923	33.60	84	1.47	1,793	31.33	5,723
Chickasaw	3,913	47.96	4,134	50.67	112	1.37	-221	-2.71	8,159
Choctaw	2,811	66.79	1,320	31.36	78	1.85	1,491	35.42	4,209
Claiborne	555	12.37	3,907	87.05	26	0.58	-3,352	-74.69	4,488
Clarke	5,169	61.93	3,053	36.58	125	1.50	2,116	25.35	8,347
Clay	4,006	38.95	6,171	59.99	109	1.06	-2,165	-21.05	10,286
Coahoma	2,133	25.05	6,337	74.41	46	0.54	-4,204	-49.37	8,516
Copiah	6,062	46.96	6,730	52.13	118	0.91	-668	-5.17	12,910
Covington	5,604	59.80	3,637	38.81	131	1.40	1,967	20.99	9,372
DeSoto	43,171	56.76	31,115	40.91	1,768	2.32	12,056	15.85	76,054
Forrest	16,079	50.81	14,871	46.99	695	2.20	1,208	3.82	31,645
Franklin	2,833	63.56	1,570	35.23	54	1.21	1,263	28.34	4,457
George	8,811	80.72	1,844	16.89	260	2.38	6,967	63.83	10,915
Greene	4,395	76.84	1,196	20.91	129	2.26	3,199	55.93	5,720
Grenada	5,654	51.72	5,120	46.84	157	1.44	534	4.89	10,931
Hancock	14,537	70.02	5,651	27.22	573	2.76	8,886	42.80	20,761
Harrison	43,180	57.04	30,367	40.12	2,152	2.84	12,813	16.93	75,699
Hinds	23,661	23.65	75,467	75.44	910	0.91	-51,806	-51.79	100,038
Holmes	1,230	15.25	6,798	84.30	36	0.45	-5,568	-69.05	8,064
Humphreys	1,023	24.43	3,135	74.87	29	0.69	-2,112	-50.44	4,187
Issaquena	309	45.37	367	53.89	5	0.73	-58	-8.52	681
Itawamba	8,818	82.04	1,680	15.63	251	2.34	7,138	66.41	10,749
Jackson	33,608	61.93	19,334	35.63	1,325	2.44	14,274	26.30	54,267
Jasper	4,102	46.88	4,556	52.07	92	1.05	-454	-5.19	8,750
Jefferson Davis	2,400	38.70	3,758	60.59	44	0.71	-1,358	-21.90	6,202
Jefferson	476	12.16	3,428	87.54	12	0.31	-2,952	-75.38	3,916
Jones	19,917	66.43	9,422	31.43	641	2.14	10,495	35.01	29,980
Kemper	1,720	36.40	2,965	62.75	40	0.85	-1,245	-26.35	4,725
Lafayette	12,127	51.90	10,806	46.25	432	1.85	1,321	5.65	23,365
Lamar	19,588	68.88	8,157	28.68	693	2.44	11,431	40.20	28,438
Lauderdale	17,082	54.89	13,537	43.50	501	1.61	3,545	11.39	31,120
Lawrence	4,222	64.00	2,318	35.14	57	0.86	1,904	28.86	6,597
Leake	4,991	54.21	4,123	44.79	92	1.00	868	9.43	9,206
Lee	22,739	61.70	13,372	36.28	745	2.02	9,367	25.42	36,856
Leflore	2,914	26.72	7,936	72.76	57	0.52	-5,022	-46.04	10,907
Lincoln	11,378	67.72	5,256	31.28	168	1.00	6,122	36.44	16,802
Lowndes	13,010	47.79	13,843	50.85	369	1.36	-833	-3.06	27,222
Madison	30,038	53.42	25,374	45.12	823	1.46	4,664	8.29	56,235
Marion	7,821	64.19	4,177	34.28	187	1.53	3,644	29.91	12,185
Marshall	6,904	43.96	8,590	54.69	212	1.35	-1,686	-10.73	15,706
Monroe	10,516	60.89	6,441	37.29	314	1.82	4,075	23.59	17,271
Montgomery	2,738	53.81	2,264	44.50	86	1.69	474	9.32	5,088
Neshoba	7,797	67.02	3,602	30.96	234	2.01	4,195	36.06	11,633
Newton	6,659	65.77	3,290	32.49	176	1.74	3,369	33.27	10,125
Noxubee	1,178	22.07	4,138	77.53	21	0.39	-2,960	-55.46	5,337
Oktibbeha	8,592	43.45	10,870	54.97	313	1.58	-2,278	-11.52	19,775
Panola	7,425	47.60	7,953	50.99	220	1.41	-528	-3.39	15,598
Pearl River	17,814	75.33	5,053	21.37	780	3.30	12,761	53.96	23,647
Perry	4,204	71.24	1,555	26.35	142	2.41	2,649	44.89	5,901
Pike	8,044	46.37	9,048	52.15	257	1.48	-1,004	-5.79	17,349
Pontotoc	10,803	75.52	3,164	22.12	337	2.36	7,639	53.40	14,304
Prentiss	7,651	72.22	2,714	25.62	229	2.16	4,937	46.60	10,594
Quitman	883	27.27	2,307	71.25	48	1.48	-1,424	-43.98	3,238
Rankin	48,502	68.82	20,315	28.82	1,664	2.36	28,187	39.99	70,481
Scott	5,933	55.28	4,649	43.32	151	1.41	1,284	11.96	10,733
Sharkey	663	30.40	1,511	69.28	7	0.32	-848	-38.88	2,181
Simpson	7,381	62.43	4,303	36.40	138	1.17	3,078	26.04	11,822
Smith	6,202	74.64	1,977	23.79	130	1.56	4,225	50.85	8,309
Stone	5,609	71.38	2,051	26.10	198	2.52	3,558	45.28	7,858
Sunflower	2,623	27.08	7,020	72.48	42	0.43	-4,397	-45.40	9,685
Tallahatchie	2,309	40.59	3,316	58.29	64	1.12	-1,007	-17.70	5,689
Tate	8,071	61.98	4,694	36.05	256	1.97	3,377	25.94	13,021
Tippah	7,394	73.69	2,432	24.24	208	2.07	4,962	49.45	10,034
Tishomingo	7,216	79.59	1,594	17.58	256	2.82	5,622	62.01	9,066
Tunica	814	22.78	2,717	76.04	42	1.18	-1,903	-53.26	3,573
Union	9,572	75.63	2,660	21.02	424	3.35	6,912	54.61	12,656
Walthall	4,005	56.54	2,993	42.25	86	1.21	1,012	14.29	7,084
Warren	9,912	47.18	10,853	51.65	246	1.17	-941	-4.48	21,011
Washington	4,891	26.94	13,155	72.46	109	0.60	-8,264	-45.52	18,155
Wayne	5,984	59.35	3,954	39.22	144	1.43	2,030	20.13	10,082
Webster	4,067	75.62	1,198	22.28	113	2.10	2,869	53.35	5,378
Wilkinson	1,295	31.76	2,702	66.27	80	1.96	-1,407	-34.51	4,077
Winston	4,846	52.32	4,303	46.45	114	1.23	543	5.86	9,263
Yalobusha	3,415	52.47	3,005	46.17	88	1.35	410	6.30	6,508
Yazoo	4,551	43.62	5,804	55.63	79	0.76	-1,253	-12.01	10,434
Totals	709,511	54.11	578,691	44.13	23,152	1.77	130,820	9.98	1,311,354

==== By congressional district ====
Hyde-Smith won three of four congressional districts.

District	Hyde-Smith	Espy	Representative
1st	60%	38%	Trent Kelly
2nd	33%	66%	Bennie Thompson
3rd	58%	41%	Michael Guest
4th	63%	34%	Steven Palazzo

== Notes ==
Partisan clients
