= United States Senate Appropriations Subcommittee on the Legislative Branch =

U.S. Senate Appropriations Subcommittee on Legislative Branch is one of twelve subcommittees of the U.S. Senate Committee on Appropriations. The United States Senate Committee on Appropriations has joint jurisdiction with the United States House Committee on Appropriations over all appropriations bills in the United States Congress. Each committee has 12 matching subcommittees, each of which is tasked with working on one of the twelve annual regular appropriations bills.

== Appropriations process ==
Traditionally, after a federal budget for the upcoming fiscal year has been passed, the appropriations subcommittees receive information about what the budget sets as their spending ceilings. This is called "302(b) allocations" after section 302(b) of the Congressional Budget Act of 1974. That amount is separated into smaller amounts for each of the twelve Subcommittees. The federal budget does not become law and is not signed by the President. Instead, it is guide for the House and the Senate in making appropriations and tax decisions. However, no budget is required and each chamber has procedures in place for what to do without one. The House and Senate now consider appropriations bills simultaneously, although originally the House went first. The House Committee on Appropriations usually reports the appropriations bills in May and June and the Senate in June. Any differences between appropriations bills passed by the House and the Senate are resolved in the fall.

== Appropriations bills ==
An appropriations bill is a bill that appropriates (gives to, sets aside for) money to specific federal government departments, agencies, and programs. The money provides funding for operations, personnel, equipment, and activities. Regular appropriations bills are passed annually, with the funding they provide covering one fiscal year. The fiscal year is the accounting period of the federal government, which runs from October 1 to September 30 of the following year.

There are three types of appropriations bills: regular appropriations bills, continuing resolutions, and supplemental appropriations bills. Regular appropriations bills are the twelve standard bills that cover the funding for the federal government for one fiscal year and that are supposed to be enacted into law by October 1. If Congress has not enacted the regular appropriations bills by the time, it can pass a continuing resolution, which continues the pre-existing appropriations at the same levels as the previous fiscal year (or with minor modifications) for a set amount of time. The third type of appropriations bills are supplemental appropriations bills, which add additional funding above and beyond what was originally appropriated at the beginning of the fiscal year. Supplemental appropriations bills can be used for things like disaster relief.

Appropriations bills are one part of a larger United States budget and spending process. They are preceded in that process by the president's budget proposal, congressional budget resolutions, and the 302(b) allocation. Article One of the United States Constitution, section 9, clause 7, states that "No money shall be drawn from the Treasury, but in Consequence of Appropriations made by Law..." This is what gives Congress the power to make these appropriations. The President, however, still has the power to veto appropriations bills.

== Jurisdiction ==
This subcommittee is responsible for funding operations of the U.S. House of Representatives and the United States Senate. The subcommittee recommends funding for several joint agencies of Congress, including the Library of Congress, U.S. Capitol Police, Congressional Budget Office, Government Accountability Office, and the Capitol Visitors Center.

By tradition, the House of Representatives does not oversee or recommend funding levels for the Senate and the Senate does not recommend funding for the House. This includes separate House and Senate activities overseen by the Architect of the Capitol. The subcommittee sets overall funding levels for Senate salaries, officers, and employees, including the Senate Office of the Vice President, Office of the Sergeant at Arms, and the Office of the Secretary of the Senate. Each senator receives an allocation for official expenses, including the hiring of staff and office management. Funding for both houses of Congress are then combined in the final conference committee report prior to being approved by Congress and sent to the President for his signature.

== Members, 119th Congress ==
Majority	Minority
Markwayne Mullin, Oklahoma, Chair (until March 23, 2026); Deb Fischer, Nebraska, (Chair from March 27, 2026); Mike Rounds, South Dakota; Jon Husted, Ohio (from March 27, 2026)	Martin Heinrich, New Mexico, Ranking Member; Jon Ossoff, Georgia
Ex officio
Susan Collins, Maine	Patty Murray, Washington

== Historical subcommittee rosters ==
=== 118th Congress ===
Majority	Minority
Jack Reed, Rhode Island, Chair; Chris Murphy, Connecticut; Chris Van Hollen, Maryland	Deb Fischer, Nebraska, Ranking Member; Marco Rubio, Florida
Ex officio
Patty Murray, Washington	Susan Collins, Maine

=== 117th Congress ===
Majority	Minority
Jack Reed, Rhode Island, Chair; Chris Murphy, Connecticut; Martin Heinrich, New Mexico	Mike Braun, Indiana, Ranking Member; Richard Shelby, Alabama; Marco Rubio, Florida
Ex officio
Patrick Leahy, Vermont	

=== 116th Congress ===
Majority	Minority
Cindy Hyde-Smith, Mississippi, Chairman; Richard Shelby, Alabama; James Lankford, Oklahoma	Chris Murphy, Connecticut, Ranking Member; Chris Van Hollen, Maryland
Ex officio
	Patrick Leahy, Vermont

=== 115th Congress ===
Majority	Minority
James Lankford, Oklahoma, Chairman; John Kennedy, Louisiana; Marco Rubio, Florida	Chris Murphy, Connecticut, Ranking Member; Joe Manchin, West Virginia; Chris Van Hollen, Maryland
Ex officio
Thad Cochran, Mississippi	Patrick Leahy, Vermont

== See also ==
- United States House Appropriations Subcommittee on the Legislative Branch
