= William Lee Rayborn =

American politician

Member of the Mississippi Senate from the 40th district
- In office January 1980 – January 2000
- Preceded by: District created
- Succeeded by: Joseph Stogner

Personal details
- Born: May 15, 1936 McComb, Mississippi
- Died: April 5, 2019 (aged 82) Brookhaven, Mississippi
- Party: Democratic

William Lee Rayborn (May 15, 1936 - April 5, 2019) was an American dental technician and Democratic politician. He was a member of the Mississippi State Senate from 1980 to 2000.

== Biography ==
William Lee Rayborn was born on May 15, 1936, in McComb, Mississippi. He was the son of Harvey Lee Rayborn and Minnie Jones Rayborn. He represented Mississippi's 40th district as a Democrat in the Mississippi State Senate from 1980 to 2000. He died on April 5, 2019, in Brookhaven, Mississippi.

== Personal life ==
He was married to Doris Nettles, who predeceased him. He had at least four children; four of whom survived him.
