= United States Senate Appropriations Subcommittee on Agriculture, Rural Development, Food and Drug Administration, and Related Agencies =

The U.S. Senate Appropriations Subcommittee on Agriculture, Rural Development, Food and Drug Administration, and Related Agencies is one of twelve subcommittees of the U.S. Senate Committee on Appropriations. It was formerly known as the Subcommittee on Agriculture, Rural Development, and Related Services, but was renamed in 2007 to more accurately reflect the programs under its jurisdiction, and to more closely align the subcommittee with its counterpart on the House Appropriations Committee. The United States Senate Committee on Appropriations has joint jurisdiction with the United States House Committee on Appropriations over all appropriations bills in the United States Congress. Each committee has 12 matching subcommittees, each of which is tasked with working on one of the twelve annual regular appropriations bills. This subcommittee has jurisdiction over the budget for the United States Department of Agriculture, Rural Development, and the Food and Drug Administration.

== Appropriations process ==
Traditionally, after a federal budget for the upcoming fiscal year has been passed, the appropriations subcommittees receive information about what the budget sets as their spending ceilings. This is called "302(b) allocations" after section 302(b) of the Congressional Budget Act of 1974. That amount is separated into smaller amounts for each of the twelve Subcommittees. The federal budget does not become law and is not signed by the President. Instead, it is guide for the House and the Senate in making appropriations and tax decisions. However, no budget is required and each chamber has procedures in place for what to do without one. The House and Senate now consider appropriations bills simultaneously, although originally the House went first. The House Committee on Appropriations usually reports the appropriations bills in May and June and the Senate in June. Any differences between appropriations bills passed by the House and the Senate are resolved in the fall.

== Appropriations bills ==
An appropriations bill is a bill that appropriates (gives to, sets aside for) money to specific federal government departments, agencies, and programs. The money provides funding for operations, personnel, equipment, and activities. Regular appropriations bills are passed annually, with the funding they provide covering one fiscal year. The fiscal year is the accounting period of the federal government, which runs from October 1 to September 30 of the following year.

There are three types of appropriations bills: regular appropriations bills, continuing resolutions, and supplemental appropriations bills. Regular appropriations bills are the twelve standard bills that cover the funding for the federal government for one fiscal year and that are supposed to be enacted into law by October 1. If Congress has not enacted the regular appropriations bills by the time, it can pass a continuing resolution, which continues the pre-existing appropriations at the same levels as the previous fiscal year (or with minor modifications) for a set amount of time. The third type of appropriations bills are supplemental appropriations bills, which add additional funding above and beyond what was originally appropriated at the beginning of the fiscal year. Supplemental appropriations bills can be used for things like disaster relief.

Appropriations bills are one part of a larger United States budget and spending process. They are preceded in that process by the president's budget proposal, congressional budget resolutions, and the 302(b) allocation. Article One of the United States Constitution, section 9, clause 7, states that "No money shall be drawn from the Treasury, but in Consequence of Appropriations made by Law..." This is what gives Congress the power to make these appropriations. The President, however, still has the power to veto appropriations bills.

== Jurisdiction ==
This subcommittee has jurisdiction over the Department of Agriculture discretionary spending (does not include the Food Stamp Program or farming subsidies that are mandatory spending), as well as food safety programs at the Food and Drug Administration and foreign agriculture assistance programs. The subcommittee also oversees rural development programs, such as loan guarantees for rural housing and the rural electrification program

== Members, 119th Congress ==
Majority	Minority
John Hoeven, North Dakota, Chair; Mitch McConnell, Kentucky; Susan Collins, Maine; Jerry Moran, Kansas; Cindy Hyde-Smith, Mississippi; Deb Fischer, Nebraska; Markwayne Mullin, Oklahoma (until March 23, 2026); Mike Rounds, South Dakota; Jon Husted, Ohio (from March 27, 2026)	Jeanne Shaheen, New Hampshire, Ranking Member; Jeff Merkley, Oregon; Tammy Baldwin, Wisconsin; Martin Heinrich, New Mexico; Gary Peters, Michigan; Kirsten Gillibrand, New York; Jon Ossoff, Georgia
Ex officio
	Patty Murray, Washington

== Historical subcommittee rosters ==
=== 115th Congress ===
Majority	Minority
John Hoeven, North Dakota, Chairman; Thad Cochran, Mississippi (until April 1, 2018); Mitch McConnell, Kentucky; Susan Collins, Maine; Roy Blunt, Missouri; Jerry Moran, Kansas; Marco Rubio, Florida	Jeff Merkley, Oregon, Ranking Member; Dianne Feinstein, California; Jon Tester, Montana; Tom Udall, New Mexico; Patrick Leahy, Vermont; Tammy Baldwin, Wisconsin
Ex officio
(until April 1, 2018); Richard Shelby, Alabama (from April 1, 2018)	

=== 116th Congress ===
Majority	Minority
John Hoeven, North Dakota, Chairman; Mitch McConnell, Kentucky; Susan Collins, Maine; Roy Blunt, Missouri; Jerry Moran, Kansas; John Kennedy, Louisiana; Cindy Hyde-Smith, Mississippi	Jeff Merkley, Oregon, Ranking Member; Dianne Feinstein, California; Jon Tester, Montana; Tom Udall, New Mexico; Patrick Leahy, Vermont; Tammy Baldwin, Wisconsin
Ex officio
Richard Shelby, Alabama	

=== 117th Congress ===
Majority	Minority
Tammy Baldwin, Wisconsin, Chair; Jeff Merkley, Oregon; Dianne Feinstein, California; Jon Tester, Montana; Patrick Leahy, Vermont; Brian Schatz, Hawaii; Martin Heinrich, New Mexico	John Hoeven, North Dakota, Ranking Member; Mitch McConnell, Kentucky; Susan Collins, Maine; Roy Blunt, Missouri; Jerry Moran, Kansas; Cindy Hyde-Smith, Mississippi; Mike Braun, Indiana
Ex officio
	Richard Shelby, Alabama

=== 118th Congress ===
Majority	Minority
Martin Heinrich, New Mexico, Chair; Jeff Merkley, Oregon; Dianne Feinstein, California (until September 29, 2023); Jon Tester, Montana; Joe Manchin, West Virginia; Gary Peters, Michigan; Tammy Baldwin, Wisconsin; Kyrsten Sinema, Arizona (from October 17, 2023)	John Hoeven, North Dakota, Ranking Member; Mitch McConnell, Kentucky; Susan Collins, Maine; Deb Fischer, Nebraska; Jerry Moran, Kansas; Cindy Hyde-Smith, Mississippi
Ex officio
Patty Murray, Washington	

== See also ==
- United States House Appropriations Subcommittee on Agriculture, Rural Development, Food and Drug Administration, and Related Agencies
