= United States Senate Appropriations Subcommittee on Interior, Environment, and Related Agencies =

US Senate committee

The U.S. Senate Appropriations Subcommittee on Interior, Environment, and Related Agencies is one of twelve subcommittees of the U.S. Senate Committee on Appropriations. It was formerly known as the Subcommittee on Interior and Related Agencies, but was renamed to reflect its jurisdiction over funding for federal environmental programs, and to more closely align the subcommittee with its counterpart on the United States House Appropriations Committee. The United States Senate Committee on Appropriations has joint jurisdiction with the House Committee on Appropriations over all appropriations bills in the United States Congress. Each committee has 12 matching subcommittees, each of which is tasked with working on one of the twelve annual regular appropriations bills. This subcommittee has jurisdiction over the budget for the United States Department of the Interior and the United States Environmental Protection Agency.

== Appropriations process ==
Traditionally, after a federal budget for the upcoming fiscal year has been passed, the appropriations subcommittees receive information about what the budget sets as their spending ceilings. This is called "302(b) allocations" after section 302(b) of the Congressional Budget Act of 1974. That amount is separated into smaller amounts for each of the twelve Subcommittees. The federal budget does not become law and is not signed by the President. Instead, it is guide for the House and the Senate in making appropriations and tax decisions. However, no budget is required and each chamber has procedures in place for what to do without one. The House and Senate now consider appropriations bills simultaneously, although originally the House went first. The House Committee on Appropriations usually reports the appropriations bills in May and June and the Senate in June. Any differences between appropriations bills passed by the House and the Senate are resolved in the fall.

== Appropriations bills ==
An appropriations bill is a bill that appropriates (gives to, sets aside for) money to specific federal government departments, agencies, and programs. The money provides funding for operations, personnel, equipment, and activities. Regular appropriations bills are passed annually, with the funding they provide covering one fiscal year. The fiscal year is the accounting period of the federal government, which runs from October 1 to September 30 of the following year.

There are three types of appropriations bills: regular appropriations bills, continuing resolutions, and supplemental appropriations bills. Regular appropriations bills are the twelve standard bills that cover the funding for the federal government for one fiscal year and that are supposed to be enacted into law by October 1. If Congress has not enacted the regular appropriations bills by the time, it can pass a continuing resolution, which continues the pre-existing appropriations at the same levels as the previous fiscal year (or with minor modifications) for a set amount of time. The third type of appropriations bills are supplemental appropriations bills, which add additional funding above and beyond what was originally appropriated at the beginning of the fiscal year. Supplemental appropriations bills can be used for things like disaster relief.

Appropriations bills are one part of a larger United States budget and spending process. They are preceded in that process by the president's budget proposal, congressional budget resolutions, and the 302(b) allocation. Article One of the United States Constitution, section 9, clause 7, states that "No money shall be drawn from the Treasury, but in Consequence of Appropriations made by Law..." This is what gives Congress the power to make these appropriations. The President, however, still has the power to veto appropriations bills.

== Jurisdiction ==
This subcommittee has jurisdiction over all Department of Interior discretionary spending (except the U.S. Bureau of Reclamation) as well as the funding for the U.S. Forest Service within the Department of Agriculture. They oversee Native American programs, including the Interior Department's Bureau of Indian Affairs and the Indian Health Service, a division of the Department of Health and Human Services. Finally, the subcommittee oversees independent agencies of the federal government, including the Environmental Protection Agency and several cultural and historical agencies such as the Smithsonian Institution.

The subcommittee previously had responsibility for several Department of Energy fossil energy programs, the Strategic Petroleum Reserve, and the U.S. Energy Information Administration. Those programs were consolidated with the Energy and Water Development Subcommittee in 2005.

== Members, 119th Congress ==
Majority	Minority
Lisa Murkowski, Alaska, Chair; Mitch McConnell, Kentucky; Shelley Moore Capito, West Virginia; John Hoeven, North Dakota; Deb Fischer, Nebraska; Markwayne Mullin, Oklahoma (until March 23, 2026); Mike Rounds, South Dakota; Jon Husted, Ohio (from March 27, 2026)	Jeff Merkley, Oregon, Ranking Member; Chris Van Hollen, Maryland; Martin Heinrich, New Mexico; Tammy Baldwin, Wisconsin; Kirsten Gillibrand, New York; Jon Ossoff, Georgia
Ex officio
Susan Collins, Maine	Patty Murray, Washington

== Historical subcommittee rosters ==
=== 116th Congress ===
Majority	Minority
Lisa Murkowski, Alaska, Chairwoman; Lamar Alexander, Tennessee; Roy Blunt, Missouri; Mitch McConnell, Kentucky; Shelley Moore Capito, West Virginia; Cindy Hyde-Smith, Mississippi; Steve Daines, Montana; Marco Rubio, Florida	Tom Udall, New Mexico, Ranking Member; Dianne Feinstein, California; Patrick Leahy, Vermont; Jack Reed, Rhode Island; Jon Tester, Montana; Jeff Merkley, Oregon; Chris Van Hollen, Maryland
Ex officio
Richard Shelby, Alabama	

=== 117th Congress ===
Majority	Minority
Jeff Merkley, Oregon, Chair; Dianne Feinstein, California; Patrick Leahy, Vermont; Jack Reed, Rhode Island; Jon Tester, Montana; Chris Van Hollen, Maryland; Martin Heinrich, New Mexico	Lisa Murkowski, Alaska, Ranking Member; Roy Blunt, Missouri; Mitch McConnell, Kentucky; Shelley Moore Capito, West Virginia; Cindy Hyde-Smith, Mississippi; Bill Hagerty, Tennessee; Marco Rubio, Florida
Ex officio
	Richard Shelby, Alabama

=== 118th Congress ===
Majority	Minority
Jeff Merkley, Oregon, Chair; Dianne Feinstein, California (until September 29, 2023); Gary Peters, Michigan; Jack Reed, Rhode Island; Jon Tester, Montana; Chris Van Hollen, Maryland; Martin Heinrich, New Mexico; Kyrsten Sinema, Arizona (from October 17, 2023)	Lisa Murkowski, Alaska, Ranking Member; Deb Fischer, Nebraska; Mitch McConnell, Kentucky; Shelley Moore Capito, West Virginia; John Hoeven, North Dakota; Katie Britt, Alabama
Ex officio
Patty Murray, Washington	Susan Collins, Maine

== See also ==
- United States House Appropriations Subcommittee on Interior, Environment, and Related Agencies
