= Cindy Hyde-Smith =

American politician (born 1959)

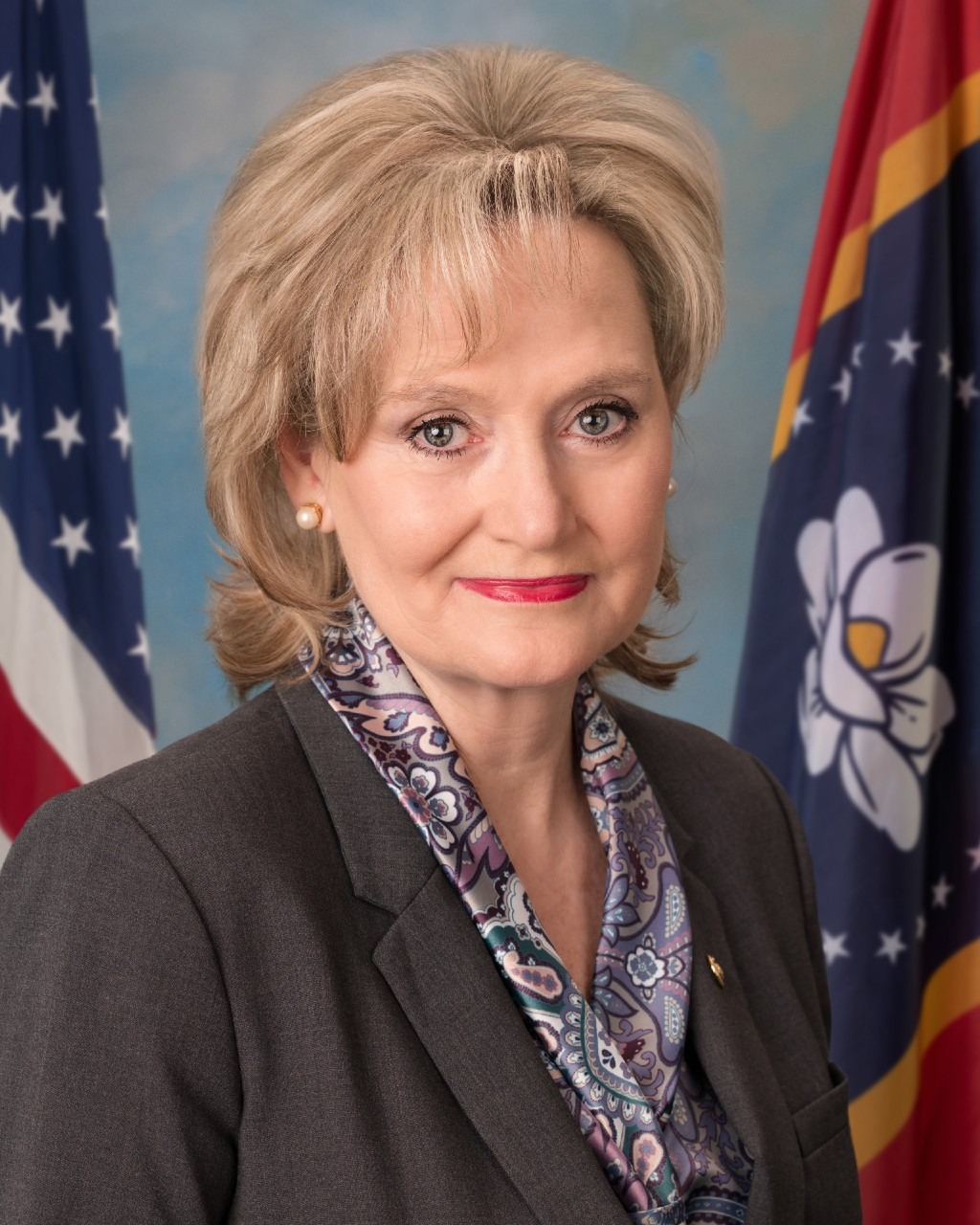
- Official portrait, 2021

United States Senator from Mississippi
- Incumbent
- Assumed office April 2, 2018 Serving with Roger Wicker
- Preceded by: Thad Cochran

7th Agriculture Commissioner of Mississippi
- In office January 10, 2012 – April 1, 2018
- Governor: Phil Bryant
- Preceded by: Lester Spell
- Succeeded by: Andy Gipson

Member of the Mississippi State Senate from the 39th district
- In office January 4, 2000 – January 10, 2012
- Preceded by: W. L. Rayborn
- Succeeded by: Sally Doty

Personal details
- Born: Cindy Hyde; May 10, 1959 (age 67) Brookhaven, Mississippi, U.S.
- Party: Democratic (before 2010); Republican (2010–present)
- Spouse: Michael Smith (m. 1996)
- Children: 1
- Education: Copiah-Lincoln Community College (AA); University of Southern Mississippi (BA)
- Website: Senate website Campaign website
- Hyde-Smith's voice Hyde-Smith questioning USDA requirements for rural hospitals to access federal aid. Recorded November 15, 2022

Cindy Hyde-Smith (née Hyde; born May 10, 1959) is an American politician who has served as the junior United States senator from Mississippi since 2018. A member of the Republican Party, she served from 2000 to 2012 in the Mississippi State Senate, and from 2012 to 2018 as the Mississippi Commissioner of Agriculture and Commerce.

Born in Brookhaven, Mississippi, Hyde-Smith is a graduate of Copiah–Lincoln Community College and the University of Southern Mississippi. In 1999, she was elected to the Mississippi State Senate as a conservative Democrat. She represented the 39th district from 2000 to 2012. In 2010, Hyde-Smith switched parties and became a Republican. Hyde-Smith was elected Mississippi agriculture commissioner in 2011 and she was reelected in 2015. On March 21, 2018, Governor Phil Bryant announced his intention to appoint Hyde-Smith to the United States Senate seat being vacated due to the resignation of Thad Cochran. She was sworn into office on April 9, 2018. Hyde-Smith won the 2018 special election for the remainder of Cochran's term, and was reelected in 2020.

On January 6, 2021, Hyde-Smith supported Trump's efforts to overturn his election loss, joining other pro-Trump senators in voting to object to the certification of Arizona's and Pennsylvania's electoral votes.

In the 2026 Senate election, Hyde-Smith faced Democratic nominee Scott Colom and independent candidate Ty Pinkins. In an upset, Hyde-Smith lost the race to Colom by a margin of under one percent. She is the first U.S. senator from Mississippi to be defeated for reelection since Wall Doxey in 1942.

== Early life ==
Hyde-Smith was born in Brookhaven, Mississippi, the daughter of Lorraine Hyde and Luther Hyde, and grew up in nearby Monticello. She attended Lawrence County Academy in Monticello, a segregation academy established in response to Supreme Court rulings ordering the desegregation of public schools. The school's team nickname was the Rebels; the mascot was a "Col. Reb" who carried a Confederate flag.

Hyde-Smith graduated from Copiah–Lincoln Community College with an Associate of Arts and the University of Southern Mississippi with a Bachelor of Arts in criminal justice and political science. After her studies, she worked as a lobbyist for the Southern Coalition for Safer Highways and National Coalition on Health Care, with offices in Washington, D.C., and San Francisco. She served as the state director for Mississippi, Louisiana, and Tennessee during her time in the 1990s with the National Coalition on Health Care, which advocated nationwide healthcare coverage.

== Mississippi Senate ==
Hyde-Smith was a member of the Mississippi Senate, representing the 39th District from 2000 to 2012. For part of her tenure, she chaired the Senate Agriculture Committee, which led her Senate colleagues to encourage her to run for Mississippi Commissioner of Agriculture and Commerce. She had a conservative voting record in the state Senate. During her time in the state Senate, 79 of her bills became law. She supported measures to collect DNA samples from people in custody of the Department of Corrections and authored a bill to ban most abortions after 12 weeks. After the abortion restriction bill passed and was signed by then-Governor Haley Barbour, it was overturned in federal court. On the Senate Agriculture Committee, Hyde-Smith also helped manage the fallout from a controversial beef plant that defaulted on a $55 million state loan. The state sued firms involved in the construction of a 400-employee plant in Yalobusha County that closed three months after it opened, in August 2004. The state eventually settled with the plant owners for $4 million. In 2001, Hyde-Smith introduced legislation to name a portion of Highway 51 for Jefferson Davis, the president of the Confederacy, who had no ties to the area. The bill died in committee. Hyde-Smith also voted for resolutions honoring civil rights leader Medgar Evers, the Freedom Riders and Hiram Rhodes Revels, who, through legislative appointment during Reconstruction, became the first African American to represent Mississippi in the U.S. Senate.

In 2009, Hyde-Smith led an effort to override Barbour's veto of a bill that sought to restrict the power of eminent domain to public use, thereby prohibiting eminent domain for private economic purposes. The bill had passed the state House 119–3 and the state Senate unanimously. Barbour vetoed the bill on the grounds that the restriction could harm the state's business climate. The legislature attempted to override his veto but was unsuccessful. In the House, the override vote was successful with a 101–19 vote, but it failed in the Senate, 28–22. Hyde-Smith was critical of senators who switched their vote after the veto, saying, "Not only could you never come to this podium again and say 'I protect private property rights', you're still gonna have to say 'I changed my vote to vote against private property rights'."

On December 28, 2010, Hyde-Smith announced that she had switched her party affiliation from Democratic to Republican. Her switch made the Senate equally divided between Republicans and Democrats, with each party holding 26 seats.

=== Elections ===
Hyde-Smith first sought election to the Mississippi Senate in 1999, as she concluded her career as a lobbyist and transitioned back to the state. She returned to Mississippi, gave birth to her daughter, and qualified to run for state Senate all in one year. Her opponent in the 1999 Mississippi Senate Democratic primary was 20-year incumbent W. L. Rayborn. She believed that Rayborn prioritized his personal interests over his district's and had supported his opponents in the previous two elections. During the campaign, Hyde-Smith refused to criticize him or target specific issues. Rayborn was known for a pet cause—allowing non-dentists to make false teeth. A denturist without a dental degree, he showed up to the Capitol a few days each session adorned with buttons and stickers promoting his bill "The Freedom of Choice Dentures Act". In 1999, his last year in office, it died in committee. Hyde-Smith defeated Rayborn in the Democratic primary and Republican Helen Price and independent Frank Greer in the general election, with 75.36% of the vote.

In the 2003 Democratic primary, Rayborn challenged Hyde-Smith in the newly redrawn state Senate District 39 and lost, 65.47% to 34.53%. Hyde-Smith was unopposed in the general election.

In 2007, Hyde-Smith was unopposed in the Senate District 39 Democratic primary. In the general election, she defeated Republican Edwin V. Case with 79.45% of the vote. This was her last election in the Senate district.

== Mississippi Commissioner of Agriculture and Commerce ==
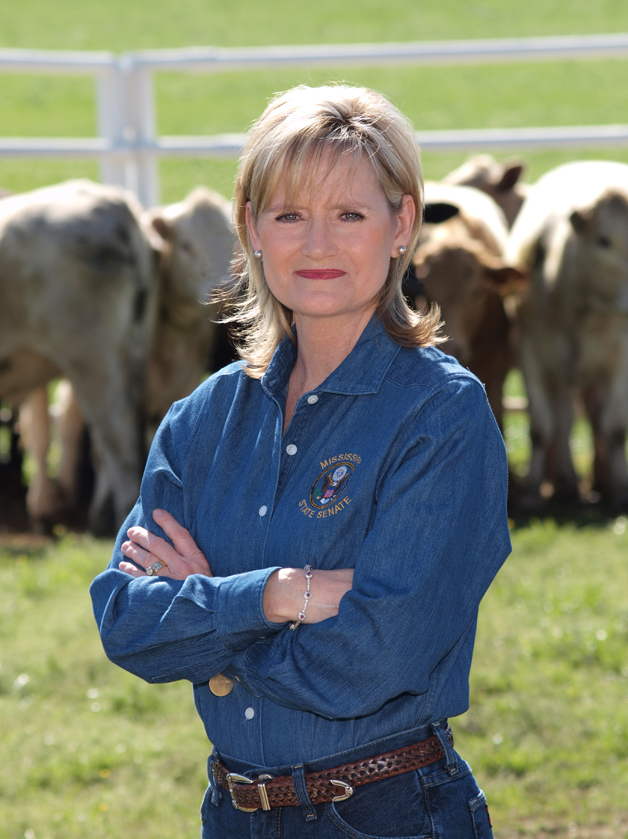
Hyde-Smith during her tenure as Commissioner of Agriculture and Commerce

In January 2011, Hyde-Smith announced her candidacy for Mississippi's commissioner of agriculture and commerce. She won the Republican nomination in August and the general election in November, defeating Democratic nominee Joel Gill, to become the first woman to win this position. She took office on January 5, 2012.

In June 2012, in response to a massive infestation of plant bugs in cotton farms throughout the Mississippi Delta (which had caused approximately $81 million in damages), Hyde-Smith said that the U.S. Environmental Protection Agency had approved an emergency exemption to help farmers exterminate the bugs.

In January 2013, Hyde-Smith successfully pushed for legislation to help fund a sizable renovation project for the Mississippi Coliseum. In December 2013, she received a Service Award from the Mississippi Farm Bureau Federation for the project.

Hyde-Smith was reelected in 2015, defeating Democratic nominee Addie Lee Green by over twenty points. She was sworn in for her second term on January 7, 2016. In April 2016, Hyde-Smith announced that the Mississippi Department of Agriculture would be accepting proposals for both the Specialty Crop Block Grant Program and the Federal-State Marketing Improvement Program for the year's federal budget.

== U.S. Senate ==
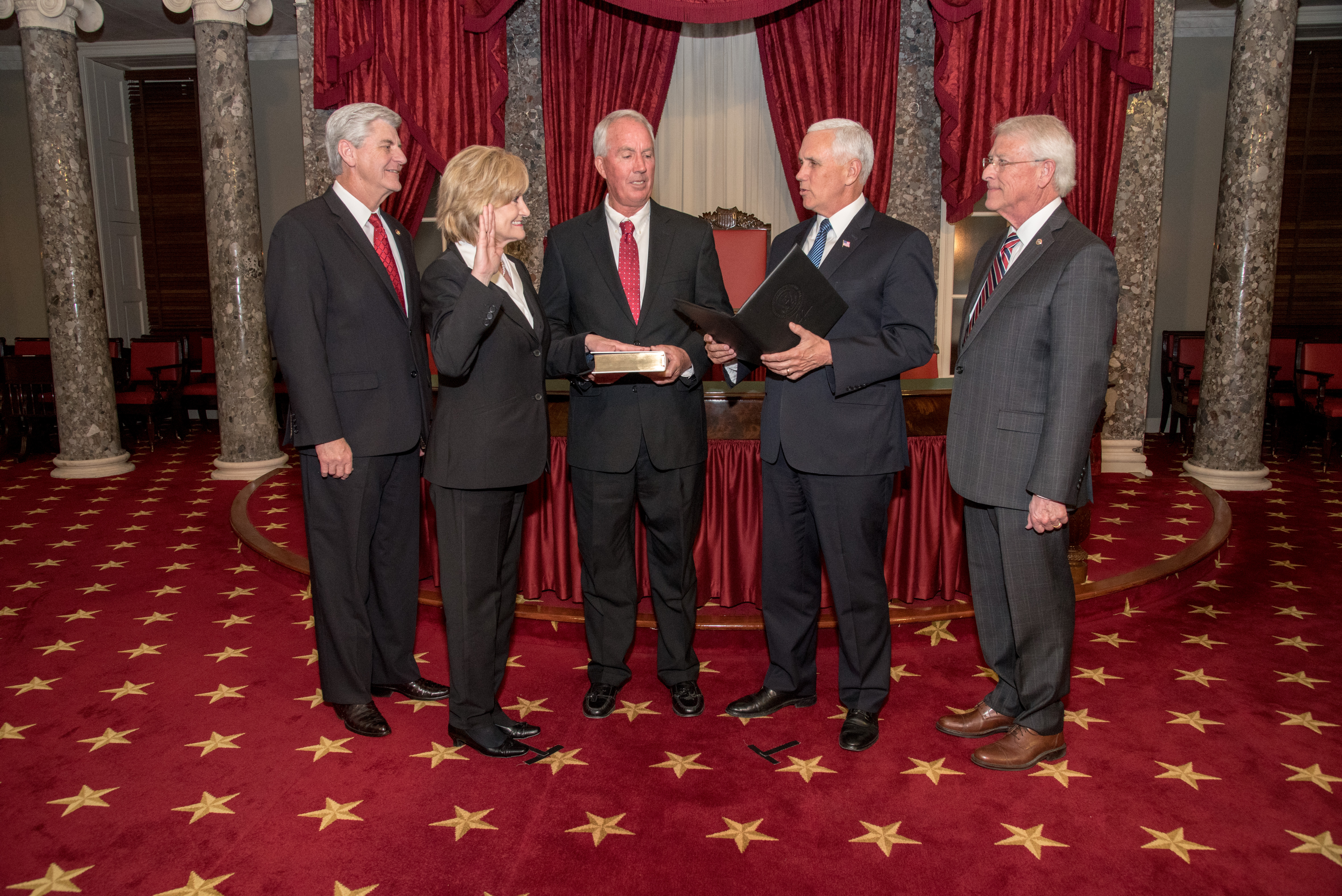
Vice President Mike Pence swears in Smith at the Old Senate Chamber in 2018.

=== Appointment ===
On March 21, 2018, Governor Phil Bryant announced Hyde-Smith as his choice to fill the United States Senate seat held by Thad Cochran, who indicated he would resign the seat due to health issues. Cochran resigned on April 1, and Bryant formally appointed Hyde-Smith on April 2. Hyde-Smith became the first woman to represent Mississippi in the United States Congress. The Senate was in a district work period and was not conducting legislative business at that time, so she did not take the oath of office until the Senate reconvened for legislative business on April 9. At her ceremonial swearing in, Hyde-Smith was accompanied by her husband, Michael, and U.S. Senators Roger Wicker, Orrin Hatch, Lamar Alexander, Chuck Schumer, and Susan Collins. Hyde-Smith announced that she would seek election to the seat in the 2018 special election on November 6.

=== Elections ===
==== 2018 special election ====
Reportedly, the Trump administration did not initially support Hyde-Smith's Senate appointment because of her history as a Democrat, but Trump confirmed his endorsement of her in August 2018 and later stumped for her in Mississippi.

In the 2018 special election, Hyde-Smith was challenged by Republican Chris McDaniel, who criticized her past Democratic affiliation. Hyde-Smith responded that she had "always been a conservative" and added that she had the support of Republican Mississippi Governor Phil Bryant. She highlighted her support for Second Amendment rights, opposition to abortion, and advocacy for the state's defense business.

Hyde-Smith declined to debate her Democratic opponent, Mike Espy, before the November 6 special election; Cochran had often done the same. After she and Espy each finished with about 41% of the vote, she agreed to debate Espy on November 20 before the runoff election.

During the runoff campaign, while appearing with cattle rancher Colin Hutchinson in Tupelo, Mississippi, Hyde-Smith said, "If he invited me to a public hanging, I'd be in the front row." The remark immediately drew harsh criticism, given Mississippi's notorious history of lynchings and public executions of African-Americans. In response to the criticism, Hyde-Smith downplayed her comment as "an exaggerated expression of regard" and called the backlash "ridiculous". She refused to apologize.

On November 15, 2018, Hyde-Smith appeared in a video clip saying that it would be "a great idea" to make it more difficult for liberals to vote. Her campaign said Hyde-Smith was obviously joking and that the video was selectively edited. Both this and the "public hanging" video were released by Lamar White Jr., a Louisiana blogger and journalist.

Also in November 2018, media reports noted that Hyde-Smith attended a school that was created to avoid court-mandated racial integration and made use of various Confederate symbols, and that she sent her daughter to a similar school.

The runoff election was held on November 27. Hyde-Smith defeated Espy, 53.9%–46.1%.

==== 2020 election ====
In January 2020, Hyde-Smith filed to run for a full term in the November election. She was renominated without opposition in the Republican primary. In the general election, she defeated Espy again, this time by a margin of ten percentage points.

==== 2026 election ====
Hyde-Smith ran for reelection against Democratic nominee Scott Colom and independent candidate Ty Pinkins, a former Democrat running as an independent, and lost to Colom in a close race. Hyde-Smith had blocked Colom's nomination to federal court in 2023. A noted highlight of the race was Hyde-Smith's February 2026 remark telling Mississippians that they "have so many proteins to choose from" after being asked about high beef prices. In response, Colom released a viral ad in which Mississippians said that they would rather "pick another senator".

=== Tenure ===
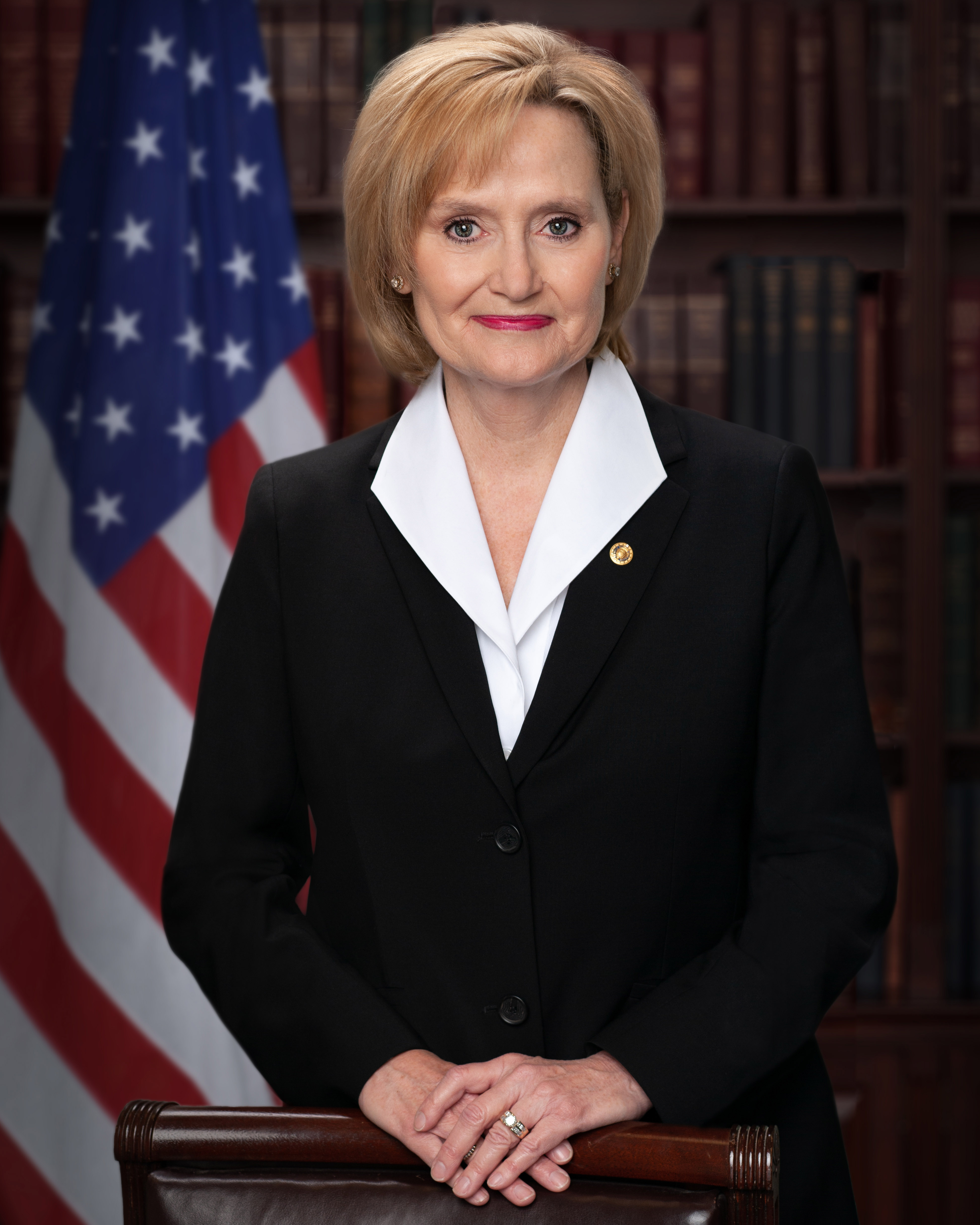
Hyde-Smith during the 115th Congress

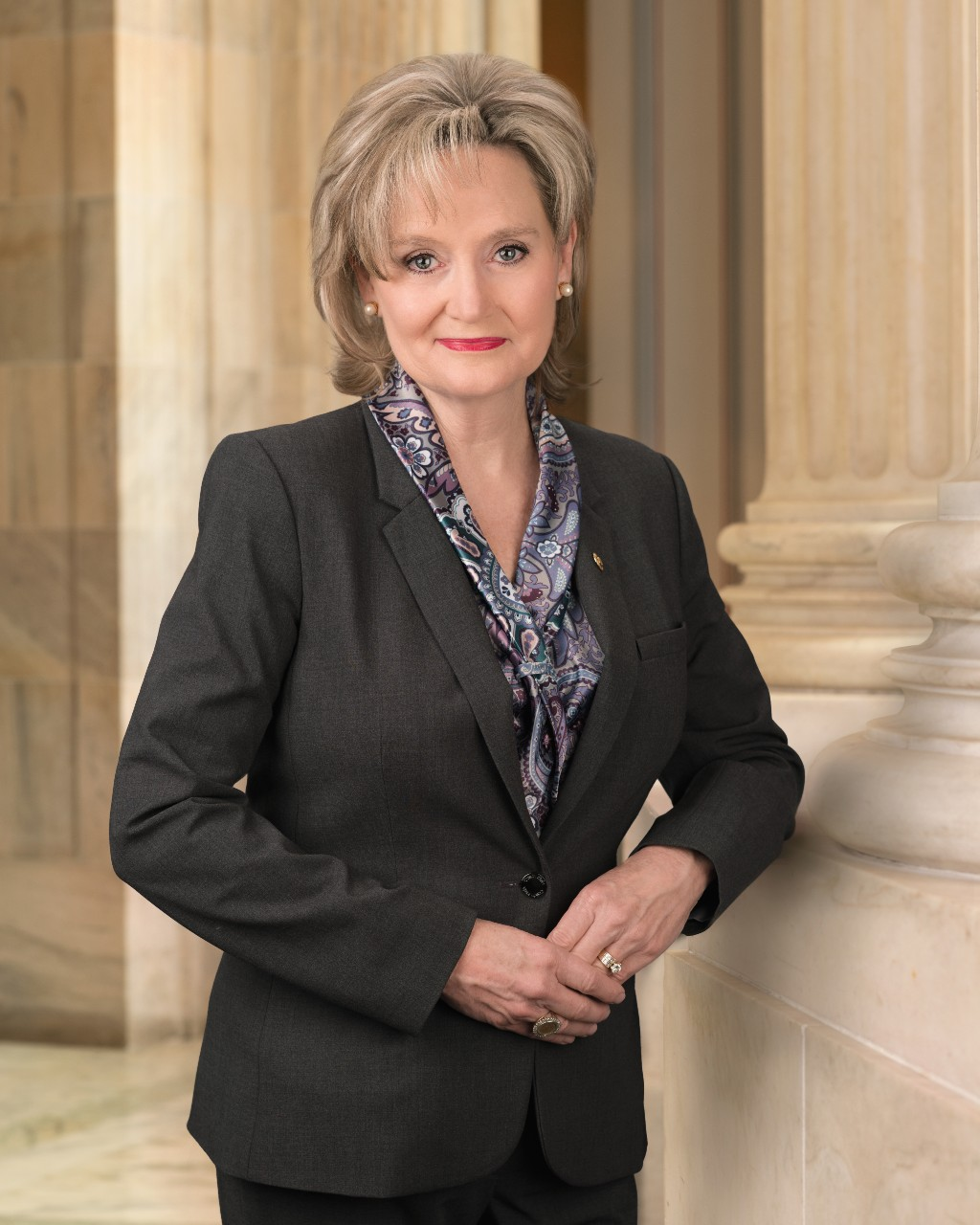
Hyde-Smith during the 117th Congress

Starting in 2018, Hyde-Smith has introduced legislation that establishes the Gold Star Families Remembrance Week. She established the first formal and national recognition.

On October 6, 2018, Hyde-Smith voted to confirm Brett Kavanaugh to the Supreme Court of the United States. On October 26, 2020, she voted to confirm Amy Coney Barrett to the Court.

On January 6, 2021, Hyde-Smith was participating in the 2021 United States Electoral College vote count debate about Arizona's electoral votes when Trump supporters stormed the United States Capitol. She and other senators were removed from the Senate floor to an undisclosed location shortly after the Capitol was breached. Her staff had to shelter in her office. During the attack, Hyde-Smith tweeted: "Whatever frustrations any American may have, violence & destruction in the US Capitol, the seat of our democratic government, is unacceptable". She later said that she was afraid during the storming of the Capitol and called the rioters "criminals who need to be prosecuted".

Hyde-Smith and Senator John Kennedy passed a Congressional Review Act resolution of disapproval to eliminate a Biden-era Bureau of Ocean Energy Management rule that required oil companies to conduct archaeological reviews of the ocean floor to identify objects, such as shipwrecks or other cultural remains. President Trump signed the resolution in March 2025, formally voiding the rule.

=== Committee assignments ===
- Committee on Agriculture, Nutrition and Forestry
  - Subcommittee on Commodities, Risk Management, and Trade
  - Subcommittee on Conservation, Climate, Forestry, and Natural Resources
  - Subcommittee on Livestock, Dairy, Poultry, Local Food Systems, and Food Safety and Security
- Committee on Appropriations
  - Subcommittee on Agriculture, Rural Development, Food and Drug Administration, and Related Agencies
  - Subcommittee on the Interior, Environment, and Related Agencies
  - Subcommittee on Labor, Health and Human Services, Education, and Related Agencies
  - Subcommittee on the Legislative Branch
  - Subcommittee on State, Foreign Operations, and Related Programs
- Committee on Energy and Natural Resources
  - Subcommittee on Energy
  - Subcommittee on Public Lands, Forests, and Mining
  - Subcommittee on Water and Power
- Committee on Rules and Administration

=== Caucus memberships ===
- Congressional Coalition on Adoption
- Rare Disease Caucus

== Political positions ==
Hyde-Smith identifies herself as a conservative Republican.

From 1999 to 2010, she served in elected office as a Democrat. She voted in the Democratic primary in 2008 and described herself as a conservative Democrat during her tenure in the state legislature. She switched to the Republican Party in 2010. In 2012, Hyde-Smith endorsed Republican nominee Mitt Romney for U.S. president.

FiveThirtyEight reported that as of January 2021, Hyde-Smith had voted in line with Donald Trump's political positions about 92% of the time. It also reported that as of November 2022, she had voted in line with President Joe Biden's political positions about 38.9% of the time.

=== 2021 United States Electoral College vote count ===
On January 6, 2021, Hyde-Smith joined four other senators in voting to object to the certification of Arizona's electoral votes. She said she based her decision on "the erosion of integrity of the electoral process". Hyde-Smith added that her constituents "do not believe the presidential election was constitutional and cannot accept the Electoral College decision." Her position differed from that of fellow Mississippi senator Roger Wicker, who supported certification. She also voted not to certify Pennsylvania's electoral votes. The Jackson Free Press called on Hyde-Smith to "recant or resign" for objecting to the certification of Arizona's and Pennsylvania's electoral votes.

Following the attack on the Capitol, Hyde-Smith did not support invoking the Twenty-fifth Amendment to the United States Constitution to remove Trump from office. She also said she would not vote to convict Trump in the event of an impeachment trial.

On May 28, 2021, Hyde-Smith voted against creating an independent commission to investigate the 2021 United States Capitol attack.

=== Animal welfare ===
In 2025, Hyde-Smith received a score of 0 out of 100 from the Humane World Action Fund, the political affiliate of Humane World for Animals.

=== Voting rights ===
In 2021, Hyde-Smith expressed opposition to the For the People Act, which would expand voting rights, claiming that the bill would nullify voter identification laws in Mississippi. She also objected to allowing people to vote on Sunday, which is the Christian Sabbath and a day that black churches coordinate rides to polling places for their parishioners.

=== Fiscal policy ===
Hyde-Smith describes her economic positions as fiscally conservative.

In 2018, Hyde-Smith was one of 29 Republicans who joined all Democrats in opposing Senator Rand Paul's bill to cut federal spending by 1% over five years, known as the Penny Bill. Republican opponents of the bill said it could threaten federal defense and domestic programs. She faced criticism from the bill's supporters.

Hyde-Smith supported the Trump-backed Tax Cuts and Jobs Act of 2017. As a state legislator, she voted in favor of increasing unemployment benefits and in favor of raising taxes on cigarettes.

In May 2019, Hyde-Smith was a cosponsor of the Transporting Livestock Across America Safely Act, a bipartisan bill introduced by Ben Sasse and Jon Tester intended to reform hours of service for livestock haulers by authorizing drivers to rest at any point during their trip without it being counted against their hours of service and exempting loading and unloading times from the hours of service calculation of driving time.

In July 2019, Hyde-Smith was one of eight senators to introduce the Agricultural Trucking Relief Act, a bill that would alter the definition of an agricultural commodity to include both horticultural and aquacultural products and promote greater consistency in regulation through both federal and state agencies as part of an attempt to ease regulatory burdens on trucking and the agri-community.

Hyde-Smith was among the 31 Senate Republicans who voted against final passage of the Fiscal Responsibility Act of 2023.

=== Foreign policy ===
In August 2018, Hyde-Smith co-sponsored the Israel Anti-Boycott Act (s. 720). That act would have made it a federal crime for Americans to encourage or participate in boycotts against Israel and Israeli settlements in the occupied West Bank if protesting actions by the Israeli government.

In February 2026, Hyde-Smith supported Trump's initial strikes on Iran in the 2026 Iran war. In March 2026, she voted against a war powers resolution that would have limited the war until congressional consent had been obtained.

=== Health care ===
Hyde-Smith opposes the Affordable Care Act (Obamacare), saying that it "has failed Mississippi". She is in favor of repealing it but says that she supports keeping provisions ensuring protections for preexisting conditions. While in the Senate, she voted to expand the use of short-term health insurance plans, which can discriminate against people with preexisting conditions.

In July 2019, Hyde-Smith was one of eight senators to cosponsor the Palliative Care and Hospice Education and Training Act (PCHETA), a bill intended to strengthen training for new and existing physicians, people who teach palliative care, and other providers who are on the palliative care team that grants patients and their families a voice in their care and treatment goals.

=== U.S. Supreme Court ===
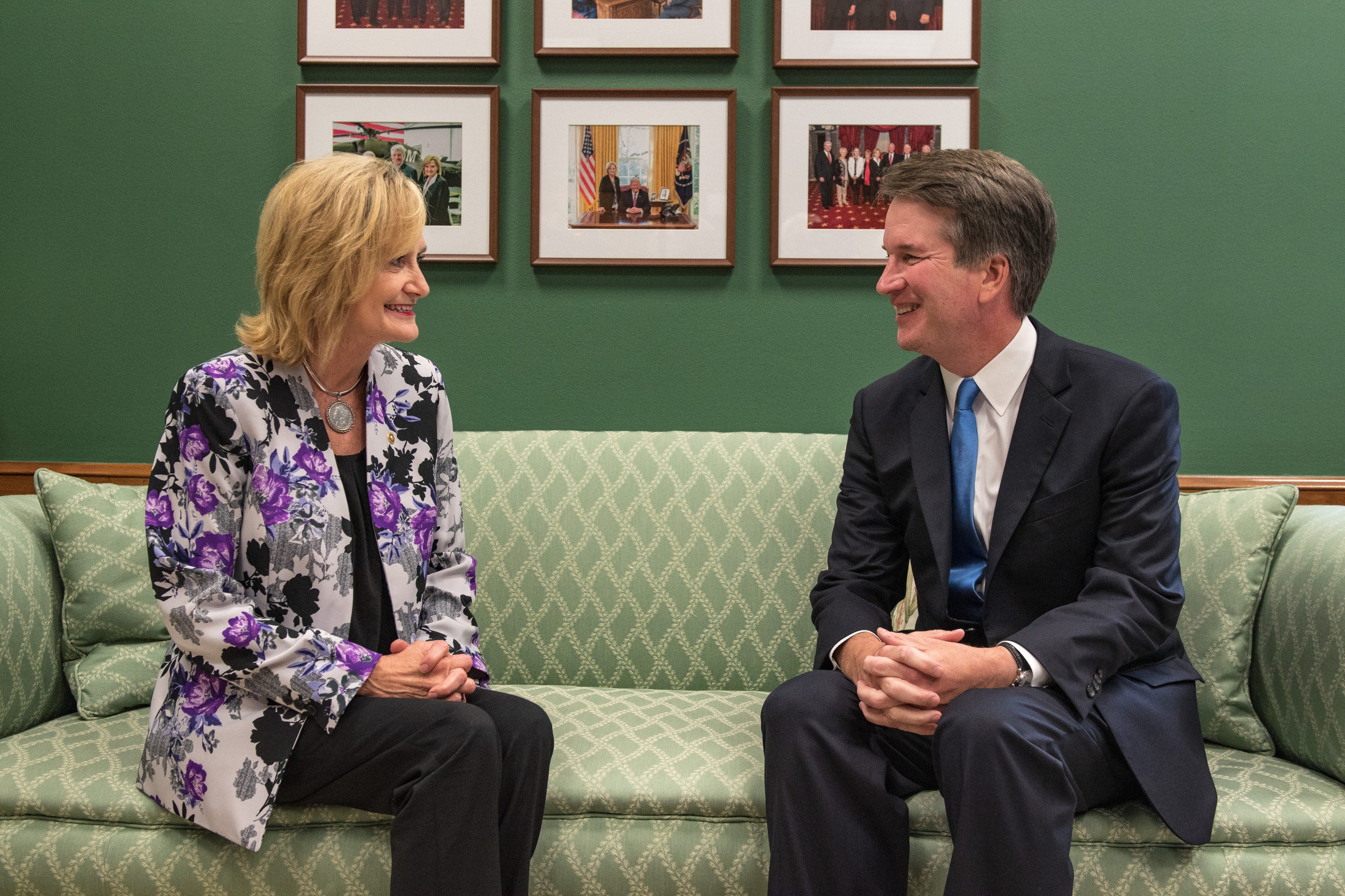
Hyde-Smith and Brett Kavanaugh in July 2018

In March 2019, Hyde-Smith was among 12 senators to co-sponsor a resolution in favor of a constitutional amendment limiting the U.S. Supreme Court to nine justices. The resolution was introduced after multiple Democratic presidential candidates expressed openness to expanding the number of seats on the U.S. Supreme Court.

=== Social issues ===
Hyde-Smith opposes abortion. In 2018, she voted with Senate Republicans to prohibit federal funding from being given to any organization or facility that promotes abortion services or family planning. She opposes Planned Parenthood, describing it as "one of the worst things that has ever happened to us."

In 2018, Hyde-Smith released a statement supporting the Trump administration's travel ban on seven predominantly Muslim countries.

In February 2024, Hyde-Smith single-handedly blocked a federal law intended to protect access to in vitro fertilization treatments in the aftermath of the Alabama Supreme Court's ruling in LePage v. Center for Reproductive Medicine (2024). In a speech on the Senate floor, she claimed the bill would "legalize the creation of human–animal chimeras".

=== LGBT rights ===
In 2012, as Commissioner of Agriculture and Commerce, Hyde-Smith personally opposed a same-sex commitment ceremony at the Mississippi Agriculture & Forestry Museum, but instructed the museum to allow it after consulting with Mississippi Attorney General Jim Hood. She declared she would seek a change in state law and request from the legislature "clear and straightforward definitions about what activities can take place on the property owned by the State of Mississippi."

In November 2022, she voted against the Respect for Marriage Act, legislation that codifies same-sex marriage rights into federal law.

=== Confederate States of America ===
In 2007, Hyde-Smith voted for a resolution that praised a Confederate States Army soldier for his efforts to "defend his homeland". During her first term in the Mississippi Senate, she proposed renaming a state highway after Confederate President Jefferson Davis, but the legislation did not pass. In 2014, Hyde-Smith posted a photo of herself at Davis's home, Beauvoir, wearing a Confederate cap and carrying a rifle, with the caption "Mississippi history at its best!"

=== Donald Trump ===
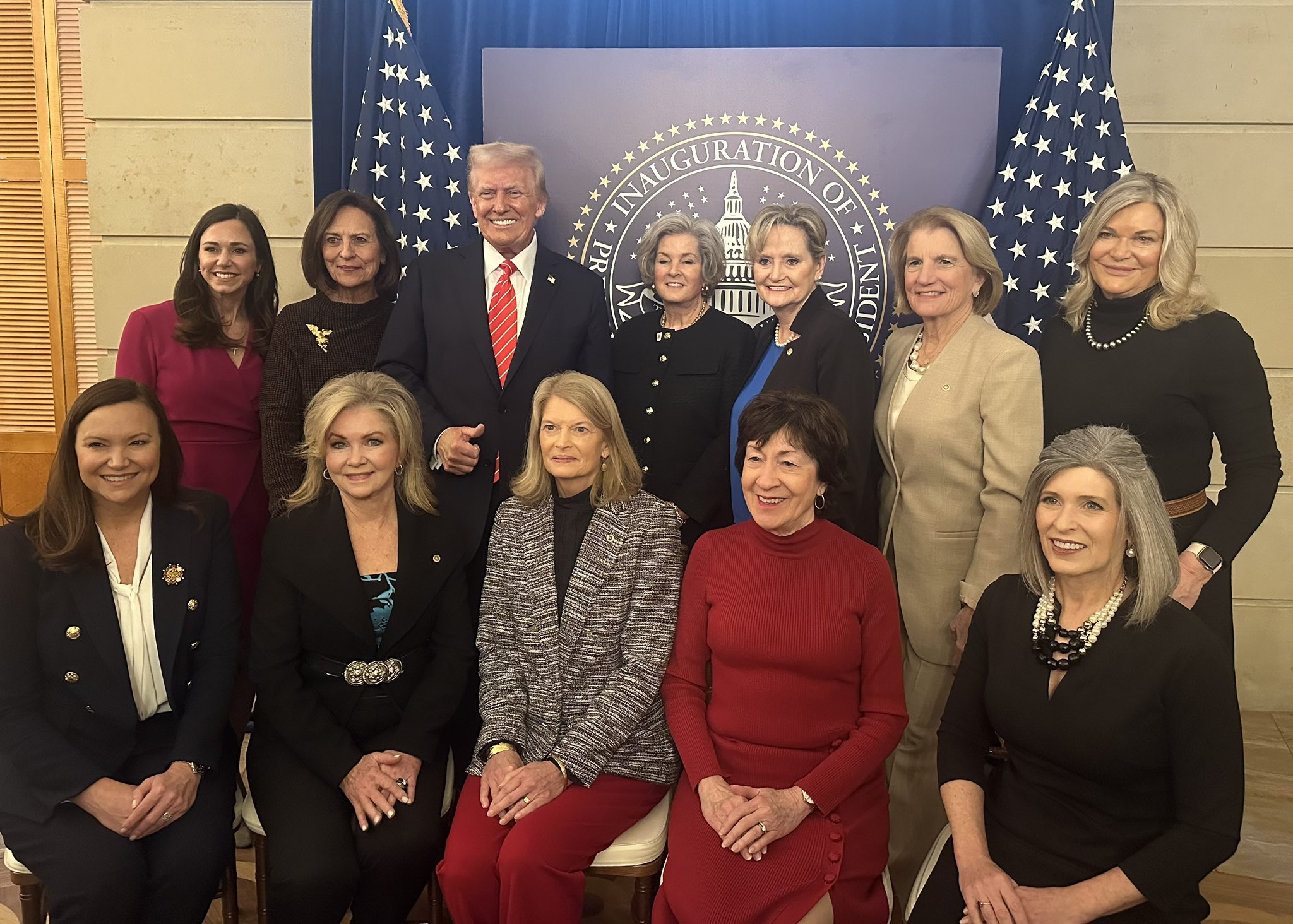
Hyde-Smith with President Donald Trump, Susie Wiles, and fellow female Republican senators, January 2025

Hyde-Smith voted to acquit Donald Trump in both his first impeachment trial and second impeachment trial; Trump was acquitted on both occasions.

== Personal life ==
Hyde-Smith is married to a cattle farmer, Mike Smith. They are members of the Macedonia Baptist Church. They have a daughter who graduated in 2017 from Brookhaven Academy. Mike Smith is related to Noah Smith, who is widely believed to have committed the murder of civil rights activist Lamar Smith in 1955. These ties came to light following the above-mentioned controversial statements made by Hyde-Smith regarding "public hanging[s]".

== Electoral history ==
=== Mississippi State Senate ===
Mississippi State Senate 39th district election, 2003
Primary election
Party	Candidate	Votes	%
Democratic	Cindy Hyde-Smith (incumbent)	11,944	65.47
Democratic	W. L. Rayborn	6,299	34.53
Total votes		18,243	100.00
General election
Democratic	Cindy Hyde-Smith (incumbent)	18,091	100.00
Total votes		18,091	100.00
Democratic hold			

Mississippi State Senate 39th district election, 2007
Primary election
Party	Candidate	Votes	%
Democratic	Cindy Hyde-Smith (incumbent)	13,764	100.00
Total votes		13,764	100.00
General election
Democratic	Cindy Hyde-Smith (incumbent)	12,844	79.45
Republican	Edwin Case	3,323	20.55
Total votes		16,167	100.00
Democratic hold			

=== Mississippi Commissioner of Agriculture and Commerce ===
Mississippi Commissioner of Agriculture and Commerce election, 2011
Primary election
Party	Candidate	Votes	%
Republican	Cindy Hyde-Smith	144,873	52.93
Republican	Max Phillips	96,049	35.09
Republican	Dannie Reed	32,809	11.99
Total votes		273,731	100.00
General election
Republican	Cindy Hyde-Smith	493,417	56.91
Democratic	Joel Gill	352,213	40.63
Reform	Cathy L. Toole	21,347	2.46
Total votes		866,977	100.00
Republican hold			

Mississippi Commissioner of Agriculture and Commerce election, 2015
Primary election
Party	Candidate	Votes	%
Republican	Cindy Hyde-Smith (incumbent)	214,643	100.00
Total votes		214,643	100.00
General election
Republican	Cindy Hyde-Smith (incumbent)	433,295	61.47
Democratic	Addie Lee Green	256,766	36.43
Reform	Cathy L. Toole	14,852	2.11
Total votes		704,913	100.00
Republican hold			

=== U.S. Senate ===
==== 2018 ====
2018 United States Senate special election in Mississippi
Party	Candidate	Votes	%
Nonpartisan	Cindy Hyde-Smith (incumbent)	389,995	41.25%
Nonpartisan	Mike Espy	386,742	40.90%
Nonpartisan	Chris McDaniel	154,878	16.38%
Nonpartisan	Tobey Bartee	13,852	1.47%
Total votes		945,467	100.00

2018 United States Senate special runoff election in Mississippi
Party	Candidate	Votes	%	±%
Republican	Cindy Hyde-Smith (incumbent)	486,769	53.63%	
Democratic	Mike Espy	420,819	46.37%	
Total votes		907,588	100.00	N/A
Republican hold				

==== 2020 ====
2020 United States Senate Mississippi Republican primary election
Party	Candidate	Votes	%
Republican	Cindy Hyde-Smith (incumbent)	235,463	100.00
Total votes		235,463	100.00

2020 United States Senate election in Mississippi
Party	Candidate	Votes	%	±%
Republican	Cindy Hyde-Smith (incumbent)	709,539	54.10	+0.25
Democratic	Mike Espy	578,806	44.13	−2.02
Libertarian	Jimmy Edwards	23,152	1.77	N/A
Total votes		1,311,497	100.00	
Republican hold				

== See also ==
- List of American politicians who switched parties in office
- List of party switchers in the United States
- Women in the United States Senate

Party political offices
Preceded by Lester Spell	Republican nominee for Agriculture Commissioner of Mississippi; 2011, 2015	Succeeded by Andy Gipson
Preceded by Thad Cochran	Republican nominee for U.S. Senator from Mississippi (Class 2); 2018, 2020, 2026	Most recent
Political offices
Preceded by Lester Spell	Agriculture Commissioner of Mississippi; 2012–2018	Succeeded by Andy Gipson
U.S. Senate
Preceded by Thad Cochran	United States Senator (Class 2) from Mississippi; 2018–present Served alongside: Roger Wicker	Incumbent
U.S. order of precedence (ceremonial)
Preceded by Tina Smith	Order of precedence of the United States as United States Senator	Succeeded by Marsha Blackburn
Preceded by Tina Smith	United States senators by seniority 63rd	Succeeded by Marsha Blackburn
