= 2017 United States federal budget =

U.S. budget from October 1, 2016 to September 30, 2017

2017 Budget of the United States federal government
- Submitted: February 9, 2016
- Submitted by: Barack Obama
- Submitted to: 114th Congress
- Country: United States
- Total revenue: $3.644 trillion (requested) $3.316 trillion (actual); 17.3% of GDP
- Total expenditures: $4.147 trillion (requested) $3.982 trillion (actual); 20.8% of GDP
- Deficit: $503 billion (requested) $665 billion (actual); 3.5% of GDP
- Debt: $20.24 trillion (actual) 105.5% of GDP
- GDP: $19.177 trillion (actual)
- Website: Office of Management and Budget

The 2017 United States federal budget is the United States federal budget for fiscal year 2017, which lasted from October 1, 2016 to September 30, 2017. President Barack Obama submitted a budget proposal to the 114th Congress on February 9, 2016. The 2017 fiscal year overlaps the end of the Obama administration and the beginning of the Trump administration.

The government was initially funded through a series of three temporary continuing resolutions. Funding for military construction and the Department of Veterans Affairs was enacted on September 29, 2016 as part of the Continuing Appropriations and Military Construction, Veterans Affairs, and Related Agencies Appropriations Act, 2017, and Zika Response and Preparedness Act. The remaining funding was passed as an omnibus spending bill, the Consolidated Appropriations Act, 2017, enacted on May 5, 2017.

== Background ==
The federal budget outlines the government’s plans for spending and revenue. In the United States, the federal budget request is first introduced by the president. The federal budget and all appropriations must then be written and approved by the United States Congress. In Congress the process begins with the House Budget Committee and the Senate Budget Committee creating their own budget. After both houses pass a budget resolution, representatives and senators come up with a conference report negotiating between both the House and Senate versions. Budget resolutions do not go to the president for a signature or veto. This budget does not directly enact the actual spending of the federal government, but it sets the amounts that each congressional committee is allowed to spend on the programs, agencies and departments for which it is responsible. Actual spending is driven by the final appropriations bills.

The Budget Control Act of 2011 (BCA) had established spending caps on defense and non-defense spending, which were first applied in FY2013. Just before midnight on October 26, 2015, Republican and Democratic leaders reached an agreement, the Bipartisan Budget Act of 2015, to increase the budget caps imposed by the BCA for fiscal years by $50 billion in FY2016 and $30 billion in FY2017, and temporarily suspend the debt limit until March 15, 2017. The increased spending was to be offset by changes in Medicare, Social Security disability insurance, selling off oil from the strategic petroleum reserves, and other changes.

== Budget proposals ==
The Obama administration's proposed budget for 2017 proposed spending $4.2 trillion and raising $3.6 trillion in tax revenue. The administration's stated priorities are creating jobs, building 21st century transportation, investing in medical research, addressing climate change, and increased funding for national security.

Congress did not pass a regular budget resolution for the 2017 fiscal year during the 114th Congress, but did so early in the 115th Congress, over three months after the fiscal year had actually begun.

== Related legislation ==
=== 114th Congress ===
On September 28, 2016, Congress passed a continuing resolution which extended funding at previous years levels up to December 9, 2016. The continuing resolution avoided a government shutdown and directed funding specifically for protection against the Zika virus and flood relief in Louisiana. The resolution did not include funding some members of Congress requested for the lead crisis in Flint, Michigan. The continuing resolution was named as the Continuing Appropriations and Military Construction, Veterans Affairs, and Related Agencies Appropriations Act, 2017, and Zika Response and Preparedness Act.

In November 2016, shortly after the 2016 presidential election, the incoming Trump administration advocated for a second continuing resolution funding the government only until the end of March, to allow the incoming administration influence over the 2017 budget. The House Republican leadership acceded to this plan, although some lawmakers expressed concern that delaying the final appropriations legislation would distract Congress from other priorities during the beginning of Trump's administration. The final bill, the Further Continuing and Security Assistance Appropriations Act, 2017, extended funding through April 28, 2017. It was passed by the House and Senate on December 8 and 9, 2016, respectively. The passage of the bill in the Senate was delayed after Democrats objected to the fact that an extension of health benefits for retired miners would not last until the end of the year, but a compromise was made to take up the matter in January.

=== 115th Congress ===
On January 12, 2017, the Senate voted 51 to 48 to pass a FY2017 budget resolution, S.Con.Res. 3, that contained language allowing the repeal of the Affordable Care Act through the budget reconciliation process, which disallows a filibuster in the Senate. The resulting bill, the American Health Care Act of 2017 was initially publicly released by House Republicans on March 6, 2017. The bill was initially withdrawn on March 24 after it failed to gain sufficient House Republican support to pass it, but continuing attempts at compromise led to a new attempt to pass it in early May.

The Trump administration released its preliminary 2018 federal budget request on March 16, 2017. The budget also proposed changes to the BCA spending caps for FY2017, with defense spending increasing by $25 billion (from $551 to $576 billion), and non-defense spending decreasing by $15 billion (from $519 billion to $504 billion).

On April 28, 2017, Congress passed a one-week continuing resolution that extended funding through May 5, 2017. On May 1, a bipartisan agreement was announced on the Consolidated Appropriations Act, 2017, which included all of the remaining appropriations bills.

Near the end of the fiscal year, on September 8, additional disaster funding due to Hurricane Harvey was enacted as part of the Continuing Appropriations Act, 2018 and Supplemental Appropriations for Disaster Relief Requirements Act, 2017.

== Total revenue ==
=== Receipts ===
Receipts by Source
1. Individual income tax (47.9%)
2. Social Security/other payroll tax (35.0%)
3. Corporate income tax (9.00%)
4. Excise tax (2.50%)
5. Estate and gift taxes (0.70%)
6. Customs duties (1.00%)
7. Miscellaneous receipts (3.90%)

Receipts by source: (in billions of dollars)

Source	Requested	Actual
Individual income tax	$1,788	$1,587
Corporate income tax	$418.7	$297
Social Security and other payroll tax	$1,141.2	$1,161
Excise tax	$110.1	$83.8
Estate and gift taxes	$22.4	$22.8
Customs duties	$39.5	$34.6
Other miscellaneous receipts	$123.8	$129
Total	$3,643.7	$3,316
