= Appropriations bill (United States) =

Bill which allocates government spending

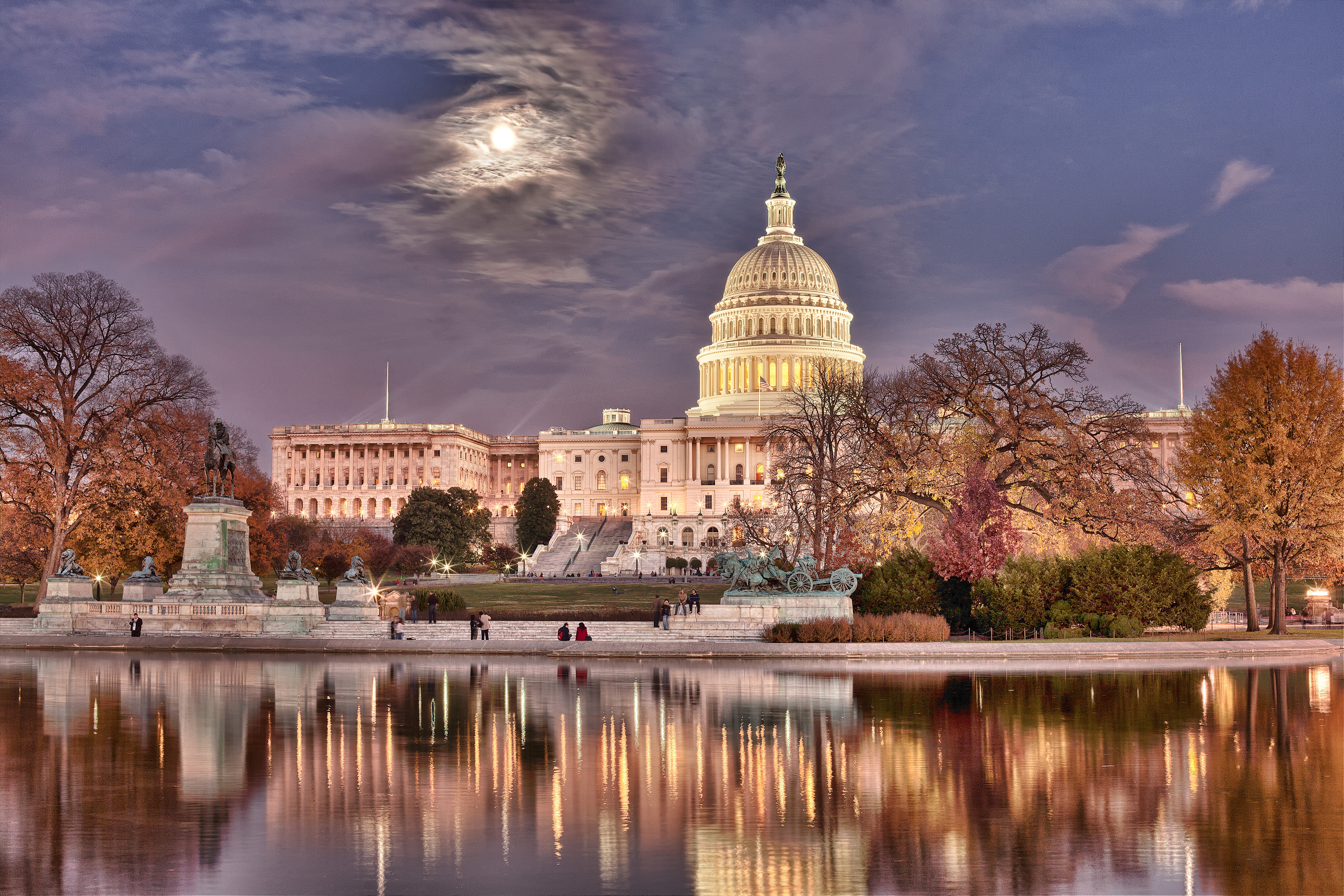
The United States Capitol in Washington, D.C.

In the United States Congress, an appropriations bill is legislation to appropriate federal funds to specific federal government departments, agencies and programs. The money provides funding for operations, personnel, equipment and activities. Regular appropriations bills are passed annually, with the funding they provide covering one fiscal year. The fiscal year is the accounting period of the federal government, which runs from October 1 to September 30 of the following year. Appropriations bills are under the jurisdiction of the United States House Committee on Appropriations and the United States Senate Committee on Appropriations. Both committees have twelve matching subcommittees, each tasked with working on one of the twelve annual regular appropriations bills.

There are three types of appropriations bills: regular appropriations bills, continuing resolutions, and supplemental appropriations bills. Regular appropriations bills are the twelve standard bills that cover the funding for the federal government for one fiscal year to be enacted into law by October 1. If Congress has not enacted the regular appropriations bills by that time, it may pass a continuing resolution, which generally continues the pre-existing appropriations at the same levels as the previous fiscal year (or with minor modifications) for a set amount of time. If Congress fails to pass an appropriation bill or a continuing resolution, or if the president vetoes a passed bill, it may result in a government shutdown. The third type of appropriations bills are supplemental appropriations bills, which add additional funding above and beyond what was originally appropriated at the beginning of the fiscal year. Supplemental appropriations bills may be used for areas of sudden need, such as disaster relief.

Appropriations bills are one part of a larger United States budget and spending process. They are preceded in that process by the president's budget proposal, congressional budget resolutions, and the 302(b) allocation. Article I, section 9, clause 7 of the U.S. Constitution states that "No money shall be drawn from the Treasury, but in Consequence of Appropriations made by Law..." This is what gives Congress the power to make these appropriations. The president, however, still has the power to veto appropriations bills. However, the president does not have line-item veto authority, so they must either sign the entire bill into law or veto it.

Appropriations bills deal with discretionary spending (that is, spending which lapses at the end of the year unless renewed) and can be subject to a filibuster in the Senate (meaning debate can only be ended by a cloture motion supported by three-fifths of senators); unlike bills dealing with mandatory spending, they cannot be subject to reconciliation (a special procedure which bypasses normal filibuster rules).

== Types ==
There are three types of appropriations bills: regular appropriations bills, continuing resolutions, and supplemental appropriations bills. In any given fiscal year, all three may be used.

=== Regular appropriations bills ===
Traditionally, regular appropriations bills have provided most of the federal government's annual funding. The text of the bill is divided into "accounts" with some larger agencies having several separate accounts (for things like salaries or research/development) and some smaller agencies just having one. The appropriations bill provides a specified amount of money for each individual account, and can also include conditions or restrictions on the use of the money.

Agencies cannot move money from one account to another without permission from Congress (or having the president declare a national emergency), which can be found in some appropriations bills. These are known as transfers. Agencies can shift some of the funding around to different activities within the same account, known as reprogramming. The appropriations subcommittees oversee such changes.

Occasionally Congress packages several of the twelve appropriations bills into one larger bill called an omnibus spending bill or an omnibus appropriation measure. Often the bills are considered separately at the beginning and get combined later because inability to pass bills individually has led to the exigency of a potential government shutdown. Omnibus bills can "veto-proof" items: measures that the president would otherwise veto can be passed by folding them into an omnibus bill, the vetoing of which would be perceived as harmful.

=== Continuing resolutions ===
When a new fiscal year starts on October 1 and Congress has not passed some or all of the regular appropriations bills, Congress may extend their funding and budget authority based on the previous year, with possible minor modifications, using a continuing resolution. If all twelve regular appropriations bills have been passed, a continuing resolution is not necessary.

Continuing resolutions typically provide funding at a rate or formula based on the previous year's funding. The funding extends until a specific date or regular appropriations bills are passed, whichever comes first. There can be some minor changes to some of the accounts in a continuing resolution.

=== Supplemental appropriations bills ===
Supplemental appropriations bills increase funding for activities that were already funded in previous appropriations bills or they provide new funding for unexpected expenses. For example, both the War in Afghanistan and the Iraq War were funded with a variety of supplemental appropriations. Supplemental appropriations bills also provide funding for recovering from unexpected natural disasters like Hurricane Sandy (the Disaster Relief Appropriations Act, 2013).

== Appropriations process ==
Traditionally, after a federal budget for the upcoming fiscal year has been passed, the appropriations subcommittees receive information about what the budget sets as their spending ceilings. This is called 302(b) allocations after section 302(b) of the Congressional Budget Act of 1974. That amount is separated into smaller amounts for each of the twelve Subcommittees. The federal budget does not become law and is not signed by the president. Instead, it is a guide for the House and the Senate in making appropriations and tax decisions.

However, no budget is required and each chamber has procedures in place for what to do without one. The House and Senate now consider appropriations bills simultaneously, although originally the House went first. The House Committee on Appropriations usually reports the appropriations bills in May and June and the Senate in June. Any differences between appropriations bills passed by the House and the Senate are resolved in the fall.

== Appropriations committees ==
The United States House Committee on Appropriations and the United States Senate Committee on Appropriations have jurisdiction over appropriations bills. Both committees have twelve matching subcommittees tasked with working on one of the twelve annual regular appropriations bills. Other committees and lawmakers in Congress write legislation creating programs and reauthorizing old ones to continue. This legislation is called an authorization bill. In this legislation, they authorize these programs to exist, and they authorize the expenditure of funds on them, but they cannot actually give them the money. That second step, of granting the money, is done in an appropriations bill. The appropriations committees have power because they can decide whether to fund these programs at the maximum level authorized, a lesser amount, or not at all.

=== Appropriations Subcommittees ===
Name of bill	Senate Subcommittee	House Subcommittee	Areas of Responsibility
Agriculture	Agriculture, Rural Development, Food and Drug Administration, and Related Agencies	Agriculture, Rural Development, Food and Drug Administration, and Related Agencies	United States Department of Agriculture, Rural Development, and Food and Drug Administration
Commerce-Justice-Science	Commerce, Justice, Science, and Related Agencies	Commerce, Justice, Science, and Related Agencies	United States Department of Commerce, United States Department of Justice, and Science policy of the United States
Defense	Defense	Defense	United States Department of Defense
Energy-Water	Energy and Water Development	Energy and Water Development	United States Department of Energy and Water Development
Financial Services	Financial Services and General Government	Financial Services and General Government	United States Department of the Treasury and General Government (includes United States federal courts, the Executive Office of the President of the United States, and Washington, D.C. appropriations)
Homeland Security	Homeland Security	Homeland Security	United States Department of Homeland Security
Interior-Environment	Interior, Environment, and Related Agencies	Interior, Environment, and Related Agencies	United States Department of the Interior and United States Environmental Protection Agency
Labor-HHS-Education	Labor, Health and Human Services, Education, and Related Agencies	Labor, Health and Human Services, Education, and Related Agencies	United States Department of Labor, United States Department of Health and Human Services, and United States Department of Education
Legislative Branch	Legislative Branch	Legislative Branch	United States Congress
Military Construction-Veterans Affairs	Military Construction, Veterans Affairs, and Related Agencies	Military Construction, Veterans Affairs, and Related Agencies	Military Construction and United States Department of Veterans Affairs
National Security-State	State, Foreign Operations, and Related Programs	State, Foreign Operations, and Related Programs	United States Department of State and Foreign Operations
Transportation-HUD	Transportation, Housing and Urban Development, and Related Agencies	Transportation, Housing and Urban Development, and Related Agencies	United States Department of Transportation and United States Department of Housing and Urban Development

== History ==
Between fiscal year 1977 and fiscal year 2012, Congress only passed all twelve regular appropriations bills on time in four years – fiscal years 1977, 1989, 1995, and 1997. Every other fiscal year since 1977 has required at least one continuing resolution. For example, in 2013, Congress failed to agree on any regular appropriations bills prior to the start of fiscal year 2014. An attempt was made to pass the Continuing Appropriations Resolution, 2014 (H.J.Res 59) prior to October 1, but the House and Senate could not agree on its provisions, leading to the United States federal government shutdown of 2013.

The federal government resumed operations on October 17, 2013, after the passage of a continuing resolution, the Continuing Appropriations Act, 2014, that provided funding until January 15, 2014. On January 15, 2014, Congress passed another continuing resolution, H.J.Res. 106 Making further continuing appropriations for fiscal year 2014, to provide funding until January 18, 2014. Congress finally passed the Consolidated Appropriations Act, 2014, an omnibus appropriations bill, on January 17, 2014, to provide funding for the remainder of fiscal year 2014.

== Timeline of passed legislation ==
This is an outline of major appropriations bills which were ultimately passed into law.

Dates funded		Bill type	Short title	Text
from	until	Bill type	Short title	Text
2013 United States federal budget
Mar 26, 2013	Sep 30, 2013	Omnibus bill	Consolidated and Further Continuing Appropriations Act, 2013	H.R. 933
2014 United States federal budget
Oct 1, 2013	Oct 17, 2013	funding gap – United States federal government shutdown of 2013		
Oct 17, 2013	Jan 15, 2014	Continuing resolution	Continuing Appropriations Act, 2014	H.R. 2775
Jan 15, 2014	Jan 18, 2014	Continuing resolution	Making further continuing appropriations for fiscal year 2014, and for other purposes.	H.J.Res. 106
Jan 17, 2014	Sep 30, 2014	Omnibus bill	Consolidated Appropriations Act, 2014	H.R. 3547
2015 United States federal budget
Oct 1, 2014	Dec 11, 2014	Continuing resolution	Continuing Appropriations Resolution, 2015	H.J.Res. 124
Dec 12, 2014	Dec 13, 2014	Continuing resolution	Making further continuing appropriations for fiscal year 2015, and for other purposes.	H.J.Res. 130
Dec 13, 2014	Dec 17, 2014	Continuing resolution	Making further continuing appropriations for fiscal year 2015, and for other purposes.	H.J.Res. 131
Dec 16, 2014	Sep 30, 2015	Omnibus bill	Consolidated and Further Continuing Appropriations Act, 2015	H.R. 83
2016 United States federal budget
Oct 1, 2015	Dec 11, 2015	Continuing resolution	Continuing Appropriations Resolution, 2016	H.R. 719
Dec 11, 2015	Dec 16, 2015	Continuing resolution	Further Continuing Appropriations Act, 2016	H.R. 2250
Dec 16, 2015	Dec 22, 2015	Continuing resolution	Making further continuing appropriations for fiscal year 2016, and for other purposes.	H.J.Res. 78
Dec 18, 2015	Sep 30, 2016	Omnibus bill	Consolidated Appropriations Act, 2016	H.R. 2029
2017 United States federal budget
Oct 1, 2016	Dec 9, 2016	Continuing resolution	Continuing Appropriations and Military Construction, Veterans Affairs, and Related Agencies Appropriation Act, 2017	H.R. 5325
Dec 9, 2016	Apr 28, 2017	Continuing resolution	Further Continuing and Security Assistance Appropriations Act, 2017	H.R. 2028
Apr 28, 2017	May 5, 2017	Continuing resolution	Making further continuing appropriations for fiscal year 2017, and for other purposes.	H.J.Res. 99
May 5, 2017	Sep 30, 2017	Omnibus bill	Consolidated Appropriations Act, 2017	H.R. 244
2018 United States federal budget
Oct 1, 2017	Dec 8, 2017	Continuing resolution	Continuing Appropriations Act, 2018 and Supplemental Appropriations for Disaster Relief Requirements Act, 2017	H.R. 601
Dec 8, 2017	Dec 22, 2017	Continuing resolution	Further Continuing Appropriations Act, 2018	H.J.Res. 123
Dec 22, 2017	Jan 19, 2018	Continuing resolution	Further Additional Continuing Appropriations Act, 2018	H.R. 1370
Jan 20, 2018	Jan 22, 2018	funding gap – January 2018 United States federal government shutdown		
Jan 22, 2018	Feb 8, 2018	Continuing resolution	Extension of Continuing Appropriations Act, 2018	H.R. 195
Feb 9, 2018	Feb 9, 2018	funding gap – February 2018 funding gap		
Feb 9, 2018	Mar 23, 2018	Continuing resolution	Further Extension of Continuing Appropriations Act, 2018 (part of Bipartisan Budget Act of 2018)	H.R. 1892
Mar 23, 2018	Sep 30, 2018	Omnibus bill	Consolidated Appropriations Act, 2018	H.R. 1625
2019 United States federal budget
Oct 1, 2018	Sep 30, 2019	Minibus bill	Energy and Water, Legislative Branch, and Military Construction and Veterans Affairs Appropriations Act, 2019	H.R. 5895
Oct 1, 2018	Sep 30, 2019	Minibus bill	Department of Defense and Labor, Health and Human Services, and Education Appropriations Act, 2019	H.R. 6157
Oct 1, 2018	Dec 7, 2018	Continuing resolution	Continuing Appropriations Act, 2019	H.R. 6157
Dec 7, 2018	Dec 21, 2018	Continuing resolution	Joint resolution making further continuing appropriations for fiscal year 2019, and for other purposes.	H.J.Res. 143
Dec 22, 2018	Jan 25, 2019	funding gap – 2018–2019 United States federal government shutdown		
Jan 25, 2019	Feb 15, 2019	Continuing resolution	Further Additional Continuing Appropriations Act, 2019	H.J.Res. 28
Feb 15, 2019	Sep 30, 2019	Minibus bill	Consolidated Appropriations Act, 2019	H.J.Res. 31
2020 United States federal budget
Oct 1, 2019	Nov 21, 2019	Continuing resolution	Continuing Appropriations Act, 2020, and Health Extenders Act of 2019	H.R. 4378
Nov 21, 2019	Dec 20, 2019	Continuing resolution	Further Continuing Appropriations Act, 2020, and Further Health Extenders Act of 2019	H.R. 3055
Dec 20, 2019	Sep 30, 2020	Minibus bill	Consolidated Appropriations Act, 2020	H.R. 1158
Dec 20, 2019	Sep 30, 2020	Minibus bill	Further Consolidated Appropriations Act, 2020	H.R. 1865
2021 United States federal budget
Oct 1, 2020	Dec 11, 2020	Continuing resolution	Continuing Appropriations Act, 2021 and Other Extensions Act	H.R. 8337
Dec 11, 2020	Dec 18, 2020	Continuing resolution	Further Continuing Appropriations Act, 2021, and Other Extensions Act	H.R. 8900
Dec 18, 2020	Dec 20, 2020	Continuing resolution	Further Additional Continuing Appropriations Act, 2021	H.J.Res. 107
Dec 20, 2020	Dec 21, 2020	Continuing resolution	Extension of Continuing Appropriations Act, 2021	H.J.Res. 110
Dec 21, 2020	Dec 28, 2020	Continuing resolution	Further Extension of Continuing Appropriations Act, 2021	H.R. 1520
Dec 27, 2020	Sep 30, 2021	Omnibus bill	Consolidated Appropriations Act, 2021	H.R. 133
2022 United States federal budget
Oct 1, 2021	Dec 3, 2021	Continuing resolution	Extending Government Funding and Delivering Emergency Assistance Act	H.R. 5305
Dec 3, 2021	Feb 18, 2022	Continuing resolution	Further Extending Government Funding Act	H.R. 6119
Feb 18, 2022	Mar 11, 2022	Continuing resolution	Further Additional Extending Government Funding Act	H.R. 6617
Mar 11, 2022	Mar 15, 2022	Continuing resolution	Extension of Continuing Appropriations Act, 2022	H.J.Res. 75
Mar 15, 2022	Sep 30, 2022	Omnibus bill	Consolidated Appropriations Act, 2022	H.R. 2471
2023 United States federal budget
Oct 1, 2022	Dec 16, 2022	Continuing resolution	Continuing Appropriations and Ukraine Supplemental Appropriations Act, 2023	H.R. 6833
Dec 16, 2022	Dec 23, 2022	Continuing resolution	Further Continuing Appropriations and Extensions Act, 2023	H.R. 1437
Dec 23, 2022	Dec 30, 2022	Continuing resolution	Further Additional Continuing Appropriations and Extensions Act, 2023	H.R. 4373
Dec 29, 2022	Sep 30, 2023	Omnibus bill	Consolidated Appropriations Act, 2023	H.R. 2617
2024 United States federal budget
Oct 1, 2023	Nov 17, 2023	Continuing resolution	Continuing Appropriations Act, 2024 and Other Extensions Act	H.R. 5860
Nov 16, 2023	Jan 19, 2024	Continuing resolution	Further Continuing Appropriations and Other Extensions Act, 2024	H.R. 6363
Nov 16, 2023	Feb 2, 2024	Continuing resolution	Further Continuing Appropriations and Other Extensions Act, 2024	H.R. 6363
Jan 19, 2024	Mar 1, 2024	Continuing resolution	Further Additional Continuing Appropriations and Other Extensions Act, 2024	H.R. 2872
Jan 19, 2024	Mar 8, 2024	Continuing resolution	Further Additional Continuing Appropriations and Other Extensions Act, 2024	H.R. 2872
Mar 1, 2024	Mar 8, 2024	Continuing resolution	Extension of Continuing Appropriations and Other Matters Act, 2024	H.R. 7463
Mar 1, 2024	Mar 22, 2024	Continuing resolution	Extension of Continuing Appropriations and Other Matters Act, 2024	H.R. 7463
Mar 9, 2024	Sep 30, 2024	Minibus bill	Consolidated Appropriations Act, 2024	H.R. 4366
Mar 23, 2024	Sep 30, 2024	Minibus bill	Further Consolidated Appropriations Act, 2024	H.R. 2882
2025 United States federal budget
Sep 26, 2024	Dec 20, 2024	Continuing resolution	Continuing Appropriations and Extensions Act, 2025	H.R. 9747
Dec 21, 2024	Mar 14, 2025	Continuing resolution	American Relief Act, 2025	H.R. 10545
Mar 15, 2025	Sep 30, 2025	Continuing resolution	Full-Year Continuing Appropriations and Extensions Act, 2025	H.R. 1968
2026 United States federal budget
Oct 1, 2025	Nov 12, 2025	funding gap – 2025 United States federal government shutdown		
Nov 12, 2025	Jan 30, 2026	Continuing resolution and minibus bill	Continuing Appropriations, Agriculture, Legislative Branch, Military Construction and Veterans Affairs, and Extensions Act, 2026	H.R. 5371
Jan 23, 2026	Sep 30, 2026	Minibus bill	Commerce, Justice, Science; Energy and Water Development; and Interior and Environment Appropriations Act, 2026	H.R. 6938
Jan 31, 2026	Feb 3, 2026	funding gap – 2026 United States federal government shutdowns		
Feb 3, 2026	Feb 13, 2026	Continuing resolution and minibus bill	Consolidated Appropriations Act, 2026	H.R. 7148
Feb 14, 2026	Apr 30, 2026	funding gap – 2026 United States federal government shutdowns		
Apr 30, 2026	Sep 30, 2026	Homeland Security	Homeland Security and Further Additional Continuing Appropriations Act, 2026.	H.R. 7147

== See also ==
- Authorization bill
- Rescission bill
- United States federal budget
- United States Congress
