= Continuing Appropriations and Military Construction, Veterans Affairs, and Related Agencies Appropriations Act, 2017, and Zika Response and Preparedness Act =

- Long title: An Act making continuing appropriations for fiscal year 2017, and for other purposes
- Enacted by: the 114th United States Congress

Citations
- Public law: 114-223

Legislative history
- Introduced in the House as H.R. 5325 by Tom Graves (R–GA); Committee consideration by United States House Committee on Appropriations; Passed the House on (342-85); Passed the Senate on (72-26); Signed into law by President Barack Obama on September 29, 2016

The Continuing Appropriations and Military Construction, Veterans Affairs, and Related Agencies Appropriations Act, 2017, and Zika Response and Preparedness Act (H.R. 5325) is an appropriations bill which extended funding at the previous year's levels up to December 9, 2016 (10 weeks). After this, a continuing resolution that extended fiscal year 2017 funding for the United States federal government from December 9, 2016, until April 28, 2017, was passed: the Further Continuing and Security Assistance Appropriations Act, 2017. The bill, passed 10 months after the White House asked for such legislation, includes funding to help fight the Zika virus and study its effects, such as on unborn babies. It also included help for residents of Flint, Michigan and Louisiana. The bill averted a government shutdown mere days before the funding deadline.

== See also ==
- List of bills in the 114th United States Congress
