= Eoh =

Eoh or EOH may refer to:

== Linguistics ==
- Ehwaz or Eoh (ᛖ), meaning "horse", a rune
- Eihwaz or Ēoh (ᛇ), meaning "yew", a rune
- ㅓ, one of the Korean hangul

== Other uses ==
- Earlville Opera House, in New York, United States
- Excise, Overhead, Handling
- Olaya Herrera Airport, in Medellín, Colombia
- EOH Holdings, a South African technology company
- EOH Leathercraft and haberdashery, a Canadian producer of leather goods and mens accessories
