= Appropriation (law) =

Government setting something, especially money, aside for a particular purpose

In law and government, appropriation (from Latin appropriare, "to make one's own", later "to set aside") is the act of setting apart something for its application to a particular usage, to the exclusion of all other uses.

It typically refers to the legislative designation of money for particular uses, in the context of a budget or spending bill.

== Ecclesiastical law ==
In ecclesiastical law, appropriation is the perpetual annexation of an ecclesiastical benefice to the use of some spiritual corporation, either aggregate or sole. In the Middle Ages in England the custom grew up of the monasteries reserving to their own use the greater part of the tithes of their appropriated benefices, leaving only a small portion to their vicars in the parishes. On the dissolution of the monasteries the rights to collect "great tithes" were often sold off, along with former monastic lands, to laymen; whose successors, known as "lay impropriators" or "lay rectors," still hold them, the system being known as impropriation.

== Law of debtor and creditor ==
In the law of debtor and creditor, appropriation of payments is the application of a particular payment for the purpose of paying a particular debt. When a creditor has two debts due to him from the same debtor on distinct accounts, the general law as to the appropriation of payments made by the debtor is that the debtor is entitled to apply the payments to such account as he thinks fit; solvitur in modum solventis. In default of appropriation by the debtor the creditor is entitled to determine the application of the sums paid, and may appropriate them even to the discharge of debts barred by the Statute of Limitations. In default of appropriation by either debtor or creditor, the law implies an appropriation of the earlier payments to the earlier debts.

== Constitutional law ==
In constitutional law, appropriation is the assignment of money for a special purpose.

In the United Kingdom an appropriation act appropriating various sums to government departments and quangos, as set out by the government.

=== United States ===
In the United States, an appropriations bill is a bill that appropriates (gives to, sets aside for) money to specific federal government departments, agencies, and programs. The money provides funding for operations, personnel, equipment, and activities. Regular appropriations bills are passed annually, with the funding they provide covering one fiscal year. The fiscal year is the accounting period of the American federal government, which runs from October 1 to September 30 of the following year. The United States Constitution (art. I. § 9) says: "No money shall be drawn from the treasury, but in consequence of appropriations made by law." This places the responsibility and power of deciding appropriations under the jurisdiction of the United States House Committee on Appropriations and the United States Senate Committee on Appropriations. Both committees have twelve matching subcommittees, each tasked with working on one of the twelve annual regular appropriations bills.

Appropriations bills in the United States can also come in the format of an omnibus spending bill, a continuing resolution, or a supplemental appropriation bill. If Congress has not enacted the regular appropriations bills by the start of a new fiscal year, it can pass a continuing resolution, which continues the pre-existing appropriations at the same levels as the previous fiscal year (or with minor modifications) for a set amount of time. An omnibus spending bill is simply a combination of multiple appropriations bills into one larger appropriations bill. Supplemental appropriations bills increase funding for activities that were already funded in previous appropriations bills or that provide new funding for unexpected expenses. For example, both the War in Afghanistan and the Iraq War were funded with a variety of supplemental appropriations. Supplemental appropriations bills also provide funding for recovering from unexpected natural disasters like Hurricane Sandy (the Disaster Relief Appropriations Act, 2013).

== Criminal law ==
In England and Wales, the Theft Act 1968 s 3(1) defines appropriation as "Any assumption by a person of the rights of an owner".

== Contract authority ==
A contract authority is a form of budget authority that permits obligations to be made in advance of appropriations.

== See also ==
- Omnibus Appropriations Act of 2009
- Omnibus spending bill
- Appropriations bill (United States)
