= 1993 United States federal budget =

1993 Budget of the United States federal government
- Submitted by: George H. W. Bush
- Submitted to: 102nd Congress
- Country: United States
- Total revenue: $1.15 trillion (actual); 17% of GDP (actual)
- Total expenditures: $1.41 trillion (actual); 20.7% of GDP (actual)
- Deficit: $255 billion (actual); 2.8% of GDP (actual)
- Debt: $4.351 trillion (at fiscal end); 64.0% of GDP
- GDP: $6.795 trillion

The 1993 United States federal budget is the United States federal budget to fund government operations for the fiscal year 1993, which was October 1992 – September 1993. This budget was the final federal budget submitted by George H. W. Bush before he was defeated by Bill Clinton in the 1992 United States presidential election.

== Receipts ==
1993 Actual Receipts by Source
1. Individual income tax (44.1%)
2. Social Security/other payroll tax (41.6%)
3. Corporate income tax (10.1%)
4. Excise tax (4.10%)

(in billions of dollars)

Source	Actual
Individual income tax	509
Corporate income tax	117
Social Security and other payroll tax	428
Excise tax	48
Other miscellaneous receipts	50
Total	1,152

== Outlays ==
The total outlays for FY1993 was 1.409 trillion dollars as authorized by congress.

=== Deficit/Surplus ===
The budget had an estimated deficit for enacted legislation of $255 billion.
3.8% of GDP
