= 2019 United States federal budget =

U.S. budget from October 1, 2018 to September 30, 2019

2019 Budget of the United States federal government
- Submitted: February 12, 2018
- Submitted by: Donald Trump
- Submitted to: 116th Congress
- Total revenue: $3.422 trillion (requested) $3.5 trillion (actual); 16.3% of GDP
- Total expenditures: $4.407 trillion (requested) $4.4 trillion (actual); 21% of GDP
- Deficit: $985 billion (requested) $984 billion (actual); 4.6% of GDP
- Website: Office of Management and Budget

The United States federal budget for fiscal year 2019 ran from October 1, 2018, to September 30, 2019. Five appropriation bills were passed in September 2018, the first time five bills had been enacted on time in 22 years, with the rest of the government being funded through a series of three continuing resolutions. A gap between the second and third of these led to the 2018–19 federal government shutdown. The remainder of government funding was enacted as an omnibus spending bill in February 2019.

== Budget ==
The FY2019 budget was subject to the spending caps of the Budget Control Act of 2011, as modified by the Bipartisan Budget Act of 2018.

== Related fiscal legislation ==
=== Initial appropriations legislation ===
The 115th United States Congress initially proposed three "minibus" appropriations bills prior to the beginning of the fiscal year. Two of these were enacted prior to the beginning of the fiscal year, accounting for five bills totaling 77% of federal discretionary funding, and including a continuing resolution until December 7 for the remaining agencies. It was the first time five bills had been enacted on time in 22 years, since the 1997 fiscal year. The two bills are:

- The Energy and Water, Legislative Branch, and Military Construction and Veterans Affairs Appropriations Act, 2019 (H.R. 5895) was enacted on September 21, 2018.
- The Department of Defense and Labor, Health and Human Services, and Education Appropriations Act, 2019 and Continuing Appropriations Act, 2019 (H.R. 6157) was enacted on September 28, 2018.

On December 6, Congress passed a second continuing resolution (H.J.Res. 143) lasting through December 21, to give more time for negotiations on Trump's proposed border wall, which had been delayed due to the death and funeral of George H. W. Bush.

=== Government shutdown ===
On December 19, the Senate passed a second continuing resolution, the Further Additional Continuing Appropriations Act, 2019 (H.R. 695), lasting until February 8, 2019. However, after Trump declared the following day that he would not sign any funding bill that did not include border wall funding, the House passed a version of the continuing resolution on December 20 that added $5 billion for the wall and $8 billion in disaster aid. Negotiations in the Senate did not lead to passage of a continuing resolution that day, causing a government shutdown to begin on December 22.

On January 3, 2019, the first day of the 116th Congress, the House passed a continuing resolution for the Department of Homeland Security (H.J.Res. 1) on a vote of 239–192, as well as a separate bill funding the remainder of government agencies, the Consolidated Appropriations Act, 2019 (H.R. 21), on a vote of 241–190. The bills were not immediately expected to be considered in the Senate.

Beginning on January 9, the House was expected to vote on four of the appropriations bills individually: Treasury and the General Services Administration; Agriculture and the Food and Drug Administration; Interior and the Environmental Protection Agency; and Transportation and Housing and Urban Development. This strategy has been compared to one used by Republicans during the 2013 shutdown in the form of a series of fourteen mini-continuing resolutions.

The government shutdown was ended by the passage of the Further Additional Continuing Appropriations Act, 2019 (H.J.Res. 28) on January 25.

=== Final appropriations legislation ===
The Consolidated Appropriations Act, 2019 (H.J.Res. 31) incorporated the remaining appropriations bills and was passed on February 15.

== Total revenue ==
=== Receipts ===
Receipts by Source – Actual
1. Individual income tax (49.6%)
2. Social Security/other payroll tax (35.9%)
3. Corporate income tax (6.6%)
4. Excise tax (2.9%)
5. Estate and gift taxes (0.5%)
6. Customs duties (2%)
7. Miscellaneous receipts (2.5%)

Receipts by source: (in billions of dollars)

| Source | Requested | Actual |
|---|---|---|
| Individual income tax | $1,687.7 | $1,717.9 |
| Corporate income tax | $225.3 | $230.2 |
| Social Security and other payroll tax | $1,237.6 | $1,243.1 |
| Excise tax | $108.4 | $98.9 |
| Estate and gift taxes | $16.8 | $16.7 |
| Customs duties | $43.9 | $70.8 |
| Other miscellaneous receipts | $102.5 | $85.8 |
| Total | $3,422.3 | $3,463.4 |
