= 2016 United States federal budget =

U.S. budget from October 1, 2015, to September 30, 2016

2016 Budget of the United States federal government
- Submitted: February 2, 2015
- Submitted by: Barack Obama
- Submitted to: 114th Congress
- Country: United States
- Total revenue: $3.525 trillion (requested) $3.268 trillion (actual); 17.8% of GDP
- Total expenditures: $3.999 trillion (requested) $3.853 trillion (actual); 20.9% of GDP
- Deficit: $474 billion (requested) $585 billion (actual); 3.2% of GDP
- Debt: $19.57 trillion (actual)
- GDP: $18.407 trillion (actual)
- Website: Office of Management and Budget

The United States Federal Budget for fiscal year 2016 began as a budget proposed by President Barack Obama to fund government operations for October 1, 2015 – September 30, 2016. The requested budget was submitted to the 114th Congress on February 2, 2015.

The government was initially funded through a series of three temporary continuing resolutions. The final funding package was passed as an omnibus spending bill, the Consolidated Appropriations Act, 2016, enacted on December 18, 2015.

== Background ==
The Budget Control Act of 2011 (BCA) had established spending caps on defense and non-defense spending. These were first applied in FY2013; they resulted in across-the-board sequestration cuts because that budget was funded through a full-year continuing resolution that exceeded the budget caps. The Bipartisan Budget Act of 2013 increased the budget caps for FY2014 and FY2015 by $45 billion and $18 billion, respectively.

Concern was expressed that the BCA caps for defense were far below the Obama administration's budget request and would lead to cuts relative to these increased levels. Although the word "sequestration" was widely applied to refer to these cuts, even a continuing resolution would not cause another round of across-the-board sequestration cuts as in 2013 because the FY2016 discretionary defense cap is still slightly larger than the FY2015 cap in nominal terms.

The budget and appropriations legislation will be the first passed since Republicans gained majorities in both houses of the United States Congress in the 2014 midterm elections.

== Budget proposals ==
The Obama administration's budget was transmitted to Congress on February 2, 2015. The administration requested funding levels for discretionary spending that were 7% over the budget caps specified in the Budget Control Act of 2011, roughly equally split between defense and non-defense programs. It envisioned large tax increases on corporations and the wealthy, which were expected to be opposed by Congress, to fund programs in education and infrastructure.

Congress passed its budget resolution in May 2015. It was the first budget resolution successfully passed by Congress in over five years. Congressional budget resolutions are non-binding and largely symbolic, in that the actual spending levels are specified in much greater detail in the appropriations bills to be passed later in the year. The bill envisioned increasing military spending and decreasing social programs, with the goal of having a balanced budget by 2025. The passage of a budget resolution opened the way for budget reconciliation procedures to be used to repeal the Affordable Care Act on a simple majority vote, although a presidential veto of such legislation was expected.

== Related legislation ==
It was expected that a continuing resolution would be required to fund the government past October 1, 2015. However, conservative Republicans were expected to oppose any funding bill that did not defund Planned Parenthood as a result of the recent controversy. In addition, the chances of a government shutdown were thought to be increased due to controversies over reauthorization of the Export-Import Bank, the need to increase the debt limit, disagreements over changing the defense and non-defense spending caps, continuing debate over the Iran nuclear deal, and keeping the Highway Trust Fund from running out of money. However, the Continuing Appropriations Resolution, 2016 was passed on September 30, 2015, funding the government through December 11 at roughly the same levels as FY2015, without any other policy provisions favored by conservatives. The bill was passed in large part due to the announcement a week earlier of John Boehner's resignation as Speaker of the House.

The House passed the Restoring Americans' Healthcare Freedom Reconciliation Act of 2015 on October 23, 2015, under the budget reconciliation process, which prevents the possibility of a filibuster in the Senate. The bill would partially repeal the provisions of the Affordable Care Act, notably the individual and employer mandates as well as the taxes on Cadillac insurance plans. Some conservatives in both the House and Senate opposed the bill because it did not completely repeal the Affordable Care Act, which would have been inconsistent with the rules governing budget reconciliation bills. The bill was the 61st time that the House had voted to fully or partially repeal the Affordable Care act. The bill also would remove federal funding for Planned Parenthood for one year. The bill was expected to be vetoed by President Obama should it pass the Senate.

=== Budget agreement ===
Just before midnight on October 26, 2015, Republican and Democratic leaders reached an agreement to increase the budget caps imposed by the Budget Control Act of 2011 for fiscal years 2016 and 2017, and temporarily suspend the debt limit until March 15, 2017.

The agreement authorizes $80 billion in increased spending over two years, which is to be offset by changes in Medicare, Social Security disability insurance, selling off oil from the strategic petroleum reserves, and other changes. The deal also repeals a provision of the Affordable Care Act, not yet in effect, which would require businesses that offer one or more health plans and have more than 200 employees to automatically enroll new full-time employees in a health plan. John Boehner said the compromise was intended to "clean out the barn" before Paul Ryan took over as Speaker of the House.

The bill, the Bipartisan Budget Act of 2015, passed the House with a vote of 266–167, with just over two-thirds of Republicans voting against the bill, and all Democrats and the remaining Republicans voting for passage, with one not voting. The bill passed the Senate with a vote of 64–35, with 35 Republicans voting against. It was signed by the President on November 2, 2015. The Treasury had estimated that extraordinary measures used to fund the government beyond October 1 would likely be exhausted no later than November 3.

=== Subsequent developments ===
Congress passed a five-day extension of the continuing resolution on December 11, 2015. A bipartisan deal to pass the appropriations legislation, the Consolidated Appropriations Act, 2016, was announced on December 15.

In early December, the Senate passed an amended version of the healthcare reconciliation bill, sending it back to the House. It was passed by the House on January 6, 2016, and vetoed by President Obama on January 8, only the sixth veto of his presidency. The House failed to override the President's veto on February on a vote of 241–186, which did not meet the required two-thirds supermajority.

== Total revenue ==
=== Receipts ===
Receipts by Source - Proposed
1. Individual income tax (46.7%)
2. Social Security/other payroll tax (31.6%)
3. Corporate income tax (13.4%)
4. Excise tax (3.20%)
5. Estate and gift taxes (0.60%)
6. Customs duties (1.10%)
7. Miscellaneous receipts (3.50%)

Receipts by source: (in billions of dollars)

Source	Requested	Actual
Individual income tax	$1,645.6	$1,546
Corporate income tax	$473.3	$300
Social Security and other payroll tax	$1,111.9	$1,115
Excise tax	$112.1	$95
Estate and gift taxes	$21.3	$21
Customs duties	$38.4	$36
Other miscellaneous receipts	$122.5	$156
Total	$3,525.2	$3,268
