= United States Senate Appropriations Subcommittee on Defense =

House Equivalent of this subcommittee

The U.S. Senate Appropriations Subcommittee on Defense is one of twelve subcommittees of the U.S. Senate Committee on Appropriations. Military defense spending is the largest individual component of federal discretionary spending, making the Defense Subcommittee one of the more powerful Appropriations subcommittees. When referring to federal discretionary spending as a whole, many budget analysts make a distinction between defense and non-defense discretionary spending. The United States Senate Committee on Appropriations has joint jurisdiction with the United States House Committee on Appropriations over all appropriations bills in the United States Congress. Each committee has 12 matching subcommittees, each of which is tasked with working on one of the twelve annual regular appropriations bills.

== Appropriations process ==
Traditionally, after a federal budget for the upcoming fiscal year has been passed, the appropriations subcommittees receive information about what the budget sets as their spending ceilings. This is called "302(b) allocations" after section 302(b) of the Congressional Budget Act of 1974. That amount is separated into smaller amounts for each of the twelve Subcommittees. The federal budget does not become law and is not signed by the President. Instead, it is guide for the House and the Senate in making appropriations and tax decisions. However, no budget is required and each chamber has procedures in place for what to do without one. The House and Senate now consider appropriations bills simultaneously, although originally the House went first. The House Committee on Appropriations usually reports the appropriations bills in May and June and the Senate in June. Any differences between appropriations bills passed by the House and the Senate are resolved in the fall.

== Appropriations bills ==
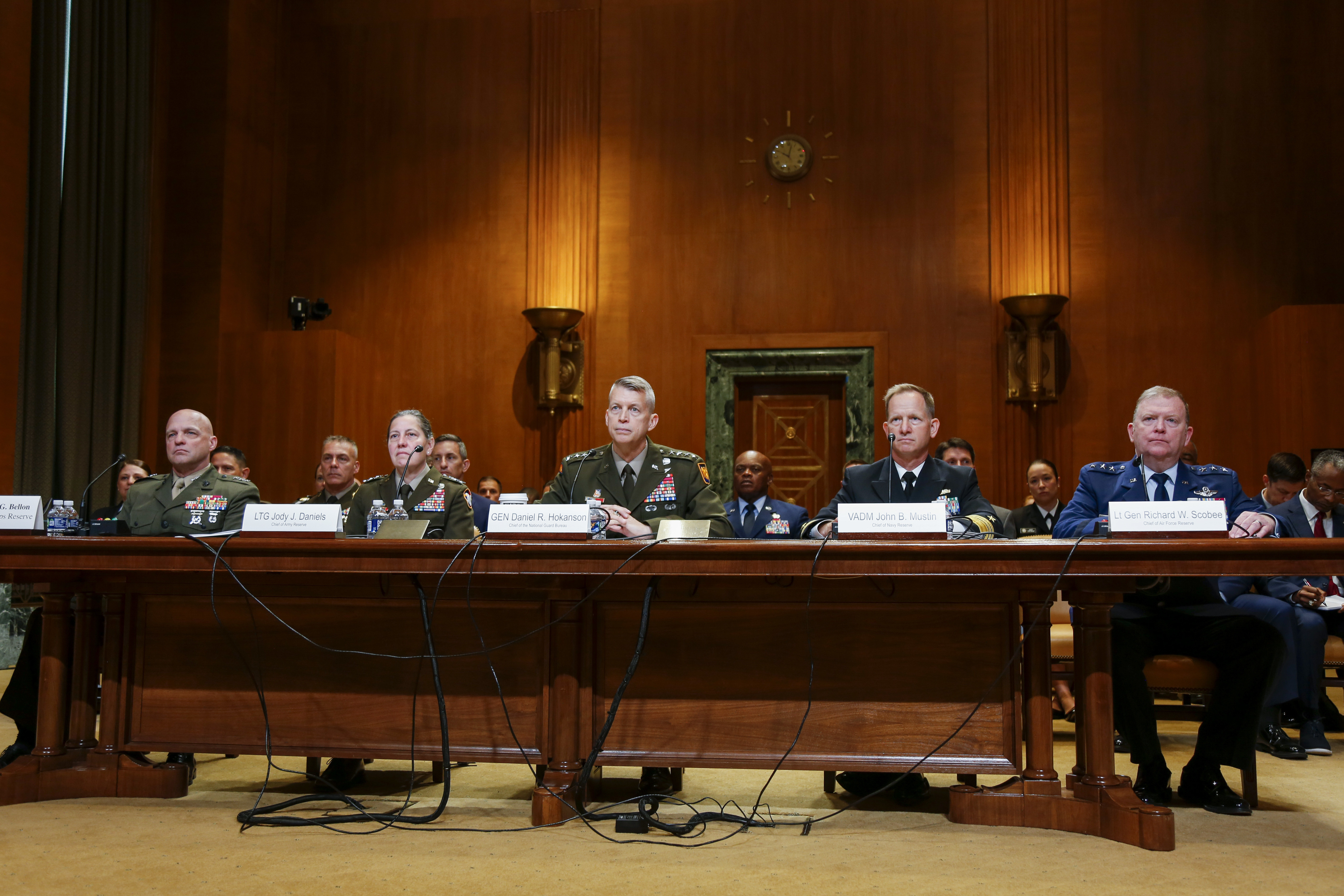
Three-star reserve officers and the chief of the National Guard Bureau testify before the subcommittee on June 7, 2022.

An appropriations bill is a bill that appropriates (gives to, sets aside for) money to specific federal government departments, agencies, and programs. The money provides funding for operations, personnel, equipment, and activities. Regular appropriations bills are passed annually, with the funding they provide covering one fiscal year. The fiscal year is the accounting period of the federal government, which runs from October 1 to September 30 of the following year.

There are three types of appropriations bills: regular appropriations bills, continuing resolutions, and supplemental appropriations bills. Regular appropriations bills are the twelve standard bills that cover the funding for the federal government for one fiscal year and that are supposed to be enacted into law by October 1. If Congress has not enacted the regular appropriations bills by that time, it can pass a continuing resolution, which continues the pre-existing appropriations at the same levels as the previous fiscal year (or with minor modifications) for a set amount of time. The third type of appropriations bills are supplemental appropriations bills, which add additional funding above and beyond what was originally appropriated at the beginning of the fiscal year. Supplemental appropriations bills can be used for things like disaster relief.

Appropriations bills are one part of a larger United States budget and spending process. They are preceded in that process by the president's budget proposal, congressional budget resolutions, and the 302(b) allocation. Article One of the United States Constitution, section 9, clause 7, states that "No money shall be drawn from the Treasury, but in Consequence of Appropriations made by Law..." This is what gives Congress the power to make these appropriations. The President, however, still has the power to veto appropriations bills.

== Jurisdiction ==
Funding requirements for the United States military are laid out in the U.S Constitution. In addition to the general requirement that funds withdrawn from the Treasury only through "appropriations made by law" (Article I, Section 9), the Constitution gives Congress the authority to "raise and support Armies," but limits funding for the military to a maximum of two years (Article I, Section 8). This restriction is generally not an issue for Congress, since by law, the federal budget operates on a year-to-year basis.

The subcommittee oversees overall funding for the Department of Defense, including the Army, Navy, Air Force. The subcommittee is also responsible for funding for the Central Intelligence Agency.

Some defense agencies are the responsibility of separate subcommittees. Funding for military construction activities, such as military personnel housing and infrastructure, and veterans issues are handled by the Subcommittee on Military Construction, Veterans Affairs, and Related Agencies. Funding for the U.S. Army Corps of Engineers is handled by the Subcommittee on Energy and Water Development.

== Members, 119th Congress ==
Majority	Minority
Mitch McConnell, Kentucky, Chair; Susan Collins, Maine; Lisa Murkowski, Alaska; Lindsey Graham, South Carolina (until July 11, 2026); Jerry Moran, Kansas; John Hoeven, North Dakota; John Boozman, Arkansas; Shelley Moore Capito, West Virginia; John Kennedy, Louisiana; Cindy Hyde-Smith, Mississippi (from July 22, 2026)	Chris Coons, Delaware, Ranking Member; Dick Durbin, Illinois; Patty Murray, Washington; Jack Reed, Rhode Island; Brian Schatz, Hawaii; Tammy Baldwin, Wisconsin; Jeanne Shaheen, New Hampshire; Chris Murphy, Connecticut
Ex officio

== Historical subcommittee rosters ==
=== 116th Congress ===
Majority	Minority
Richard Shelby, Alabama, Chairman; Mitch McConnell, Kentucky; Lamar Alexander, Tennessee; Susan Collins, Maine; Lisa Murkowski, Alaska; Lindsey Graham, South Carolina; Roy Blunt, Missouri; Jerry Moran, Kansas; John Hoeven, North Dakota; John Boozman, Arkansas	Dick Durbin, Illinois, Ranking Member; Patrick Leahy, Vermont; Dianne Feinstein, California; Patty Murray, Washington; Jack Reed, Rhode Island; Jon Tester, Montana; Tom Udall, New Mexico; Brian Schatz, Hawaii; Tammy Baldwin, Wisconsin
Ex officio

=== 117th Congress ===
Majority	Minority
Jon Tester, Montana, Chair; Dick Durbin, Illinois; Patrick Leahy, Vermont; Dianne Feinstein, California; Patty Murray, Washington; Jack Reed, Rhode Island; Brian Schatz, Hawaii; Tammy Baldwin, Wisconsin; Jeanne Shaheen, New Hampshire	Richard Shelby, Alabama, Ranking Member; Mitch McConnell, Kentucky; Susan Collins, Maine; Lisa Murkowski, Alaska; Lindsey Graham, South Carolina; Roy Blunt, Missouri; Jerry Moran, Kansas; John Hoeven, North Dakota; John Boozman, Arkansas
Ex officio

=== 118th Congress ===
Majority	Minority
Jon Tester, Montana, Chair; Dick Durbin, Illinois; Chris Murphy, Connecticut; Dianne Feinstein, California (until September 29, 2023); Patty Murray, Washington; Jack Reed, Rhode Island; Brian Schatz, Hawaii; Tammy Baldwin, Wisconsin; Jeanne Shaheen, New Hampshire	Susan Collins, Maine, Ranking Member; Mitch McConnell, Kentucky; Shelley Moore Capito, West Virginia; Lisa Murkowski, Alaska; Lindsey Graham, South Carolina; Jerry Moran, Kansas; John Hoeven, North Dakota; John Boozman, Arkansas
Ex officio

== See also ==
- United States House Appropriations Subcommittee on Defense
