= Consolidated Appropriations Act, 2005 =

2004 United States legislation

The Consolidated Appropriations Act, 2005 (CAA) was an omnibus appropriation legislation consisting of eleven Divisions, enacted on December 8, 2004, as H.R. 4818 by President Bush and assigned Public Law No. 108-447, during the 108th United States Congress. It approved appropriations of $388 billion for eleven departments, including "foreign operations, export financing, related programs for the fiscal year ending September 30, 2005, and for other purposes."

On Friday, November 19, it was announced that the United States government was in danger of running out of money by midnight that night.

Eager to adjourn for the year, the bill, drafted by the House in a late night session on Friday, November 19, 2004, became known for its last-minute budgeting. On Saturday, November 20, in order to put the FY 2005 (October 1, 2004 - September 30, 2005) appropriations bill to a close, the Senate had to quickly review the 3,016-page appropriations bill containing "complex and controversial matters" which included nine bills, only two of which had been debated in the Senate, and a conference report with 32 unrelated provisions that the Senate had never considered.

The bill was passed by the House in an emergency session on Saturday, November 20, even though members were not aware of the specific wording of the bill.

== Scope ==
Among the spending cuts made were several of President Bush's initiatives. These included funding to AmeriCorp, and a rejection of his plans to build up the United States nuclear weapons stores. The bill funded a dozen agencies including the Departments of Labor, Agriculture, Treasury, State and Justice. However, its most major change was to raise the debt limit of the Federal Government.

By Monday, November 21, the bill reached the Senate where it was revealed by Democratic Senator Kent Conrad that among the many overlooked provisions, the bill gave two committee chairmen, the chairmen of the House or Senate Committee on Appropriations, the ability to access anyone's tax returns. In response, Rep. Ernest Istook of Oklahoma, who was in charge of this section of the bill, said the provision was intended to "include visiting and inspecting the huge IRS processing centers but not inspecting tax returns." He also stated adamantly that there is no conspiracy. Opponents claimed this was evidence of a real problem in the legislative system and it must be required that bills must be reviewed in their entirety before they are passed. The Senate refused to send the bill to the president until the tax provision was changed or removed. It was decided that an already existing provision would fund the country until a minimalistic session was held on December 6 when the house would vote to remove the language. Senate Majority Leader Bill Frist said "accountability will be carried out" for whoever put the provision in.

Also, buried within the bill was a provision that stated doctors, hospitals, and clinics no longer have to offer abortion as an alternative to birth control undermining the Supreme Court's decision in Roe v. Wade.

By the middle of the following week, on November 24, more and more of the actual text of the bill was known. It included such provisions as $335,000 to protect North Dakota sunflowers from blackbirds, $2.3 million for an animal waste management research lab in Bowling Green, Kentucky, $50,000 to control wild hogs in Missouri, and $443,000 to develop salmon-fortified baby food, $131 million for abstinence programs in public schools, and most notably $350,000 for the Rock and Roll Hall of Fame to develop music education programs.

Sen. Richard Shelby a Republican from Alabama and chairman of the Senate Appropriations Committee, managed to win several dozen special items for his state, more than anyone else. However, many members of Congress, Republicans, and Democrats, stepped forward to defend special projects for their states that make up the bulk of the bill. Part of President Bush's platform for re-election was to cut so-called "congressional pet projects" - also known as earmarks - and spend the government's money on things that would help the country as a whole. President Bush signed the bill into law on December 6.Public Law No. 108-447 A 2004 New York Times article noted that with Ted Stevens (R-Alaska) as chairman of the Appropriations Committee, earmarks made up approximately four percent of the $388 billion in the Bill.

== Acts in the Consolidated Appropriations Act ==
List of subcommittees acts and a short list of selected items in the bill:

- Division A: United States Senate Appropriations Subcommittee on Agriculture, Rural Development, Food and Drug Administration, and Related Agencies
  - Agriculture, Rural Development, Food, and Drug Administration, and Related Agencies Appropriations Act, 2005
- Division B: United States Senate Appropriations Subcommittee on Commerce, Justice, Science, and Related Agencies
  - Departments of Commerce, Justice, and State, the Judiciary, and Related Agencies Appropriations Act, 2005
    - Department of Justice Appropriations Act, 2005
      - $20.9 billion, $1 billion over last year. FBI gets $5.2 billion, almost a 14% increase over last year.
      - Aid to state and local law enforcement agencies is $1.3 billion, $90 million below 2003.
- Division B: Department of Commerce and Related Agencies Appropriations Act, 2005
  - Judiciary Appropriations Act, 2005
- Division C: United States Senate Appropriations **Subcommittee on Department of State and Related Agency Department of State and Related Agency Appropriations Act, 2005
    - $8.3 billion, a $554 million cut from 2003.
    - Embassy security would grow by 17% to $612 million.
  - Energy and Water Development Appropriations Act, 2005
- Division D: Foreign Operations, Export Financing, and Related Programs
  - Foreign Operations, Export Financing, and Related Programs Appropriations Act, 2005
    - $19.5 billion, $2 billion over 2003 and $1.8 billion below Bush's request.
    - Total $2.9 billion for fighting AIDS in poor countries, $100 million more than Bush wanted.
- Division E: United States House Appropriations Subcommittee on Department of the Interior and Related Agencies
  - Department of the Interior and Related Agencies Appropriations Act, 2005
    - The Interior Department would get $9.9 billion, nearly $100 million less than Bush wanted and 0.4% more than 2003.
    - National parks operating money goes up 6%, but money for buying park lands remains nearly two-thirds below the peak of three years ago.
- Division F: Departments of Labor, Health and Human Services, and Education, and Related Agencies
  - Departments of Labor, Health and Human Services, and Education, and Related Agencies Appropriations Act, 2005
    - Department of Labor Appropriations Act, 2005
    - Department of Health and Human Services Appropriations Act, 2005
      - Maternal and child health gets $896 million, 0.7% over 2003.
      - AIDS programs get almost $2.1 billion, 1.2% over the previous year.
      - National Institutes of Health get $28.5 billion, 3.1% over last year, one of its smallest increases in years.
      - Energy assistance for low-income families $2.2 billion, 4% over 2003.
  - Department of Education Appropriations Act, 2005
    - $59.7 billion, $1.4 billion over 2003 and $300 million below President Bush's request.
    - Aid to low-income school districts $12.8 billion, $500 million below Bush but $500 million more than 2003.
    - Grants for improving teacher quality $1.5 billion, 0.7% over the previous year.
    - Aid for disabled students $11.8 billion, 5.4% over 2003.
- Division G: United States House Appropriations Subcommittee on Legislative Branch
  - Legislative Branch Appropriations Act, 2005
- Division H: Transportation, Treasury, Independent Agencies, and General Government
  - Transportation, Treasury, Independent Agencies, and General Government Appropriations Act, 2005
    - Overall $59 billion, $1.1 billion over 2003 and $1 billion more than Bush requested.
    - Highway construction gets $34.7 billion, $1 billion over 2003 and over Bush's proposal.
    - Federal Aviation Administration gets $10.4 billion, $100 million over 2003.
    - Amtrak gets $1.2 billion, the same as 2003.
- Division I: Departments of Veterans Affairs and Housing and Urban Development
  - Departments of Veterans Affairs and Housing and Urban Development, and ***Independent Agencies Appropriations Act, 2005
      - Veterans' health care programs will get $30.3 billion, $1.9 billion over last year and $1.2 billion more than Bush wanted.
      - $37.3 billion, 1.6% below last year and 1.4% over Bush's request.
- Division J: Other Matters - Title I: Miscellaneous Provisions and Offsets
- Division K: Small Business Reauthorization and Manufacturing Assistance Act of 2004

National Aeronautics and Space Administration:

      - $16.2 billion, or 5.3% over last year.

Postal Service:

      - Bill includes $507 million for equipment to detect biohazards and to build a postal facility in Washington, D.C., to irradiate mail to destroy possible biological contamination.

Congress:

      - $3.6 billion, $43 million over last year.
      - Capitol Police get $232 million, $13 million over last year.
      - No funds provided for continuing construction of Capitol Visitors' Center, which is running well under budget and has money left over from previous years.

== See also ==
- Appropriation bill
- Appropriation Act
