= 1997 United States federal budget =

1997 Budget of the United States federal government
- Submitted: February 5, 1996
- Submitted by: Bill Clinton
- Submitted to: 104th Congress
- Country: United States
- Total revenue: $1.5 trillion (requested) $1.58 trillion (actual); 18.6% of GDP (actual)
- Total expenditures: $1.64 trillion (requested) $1.60 trillion (actual); 18.9% of GDP (actual)
- Deficit: $21.9 billion (actual); 0.3% of GDP (actual)
- Debt: $5.369 trillion (at fiscal end); 63.3% of GDP
- GDP: $8.483 trillion
- Website: Government Publishing Office

The United States Federal Budget for Fiscal Year 1997, was a spending request by President Bill Clinton to fund government operations for October 1996-September 1997. Figures shown in the spending request do not reflect the actual appropriations for Fiscal Year 1997, which must be authorized by Congress. The requested budget was submitted to Congress on February 5, 1996.

== Overview ==
The stated objectives for President Clinton's FY1997 budget are to: (1) Balance the federal budget within seven years by making cuts in entitlements and discretionary spending while enacting modest tax cuts and (2) Maintaining growth while protecting senior citizens, middle-class families and children. The Clinton Administration projected a US$40 billion surplus by 2002.

A key aspect of the FY1997 budget is what was known as the "trigger". The trigger program essentially ensured that tax cuts after 2000 would end if the deficit was not at least US$20 billion below the Congressional Budget Office's estimate. Conversely, if the deficit was at least US$20 billion below CBO estimates then the tax cuts would continue and the money exceeding the US$20 estimate is used to reduce discretionary spending.

== Total Receipts ==
1997 Actual Receipts by Source
1. Individual income tax (46.7%)
2. Social Security/other payroll tax (34.1%)
3. Corporate income tax (11.5%)
4. Excise tax (3.70%)
5. Estate and gift taxes (1.30%)
6. Customs duties (1.10%)
7. Other miscellaneous receipts (1.60%)

(in billions of dollars)

Source	Requested	Actual
Individual income tax	645	737
Corporate income tax	185	182
Social Security and other payroll tax	536	539
Excise tax	57	58
Estate and gift taxes	17	20
Customs duties	20	18
Other miscellaneous receipts	32	25
Total	1,495	1,579

== Total spending ==
The President's budget for FY1997 totals $1.635 trillion. Percentages in parentheses indicate estimated percentage change compared to 1996. This budget request is broken down by the following expenditures:

- Mandatory spending: $1.093 trillion (+XX.X%)
  - $364.8 billion (+X.X%) - Social Security
  - $187.4 billion (+X.X%) - Medicare
  - $105.6 billion (+XX.X%) - Medicaid
  - $103.9 billion (-XX%) - Means-tested entitlements
  - $-4.3 billion (-XX%) - Deposit Insurance
  - $138.1 billion (-X.X%) - Other mandatory programs
  - $-41 billion (+XX.X%) - Undistributed off-setting receipts
  - $238.5 billion (+XX.X%) - Interest on National Debt
- Discretionary spending: $542.3 billion (+1.1%)
  - $2.4 (0.1%)- Legislative Branch
  - $3.2 (0.3%) - The Judiciary
  - $0.2 (0.0%) - Executive Office of the President
  - $12.1 (-0.2%) - Presidential Appropriated Funds
  - $251.8 billion (-7.0%) - Department of Defense (including Overseas Contingency Operations)
  - $33.3 billion (+1.4%) - Department of Health and Human Services
  - $35.4 billion (-0.8%) - Department of Transportation
  - $19.1 billion (+0.4%) - Department of Veterans Affairs
  - $5.0 billion (0.0%) - Department of State and Other International Programs
  - $33.2 billion (+3.0%) - Department of Housing and Urban Development
  - $25.0 billion (0.0%) - Department of Education
  - $16.7 billion (-0.1%) - Department of Energy
  - $15.3 billion (-0.4%) - Department of Agriculture
  - $14.9 billion (+2.9%) - Department of Justice
  - $13.7 billion (-0.5%) - National Aeronautics and Space Administration
  - $4.1 billion (+0.2%) - Department of Commerce
  - $10.2 billion (0.0%) - Department of Labor
  - $11.3 billion (+0.8%) - Department of the Treasury
  - $7.3 billion (0.0%) - Department of the Interior
  - $6.7 billion (+0.1%) - Environmental Protection Agency
  - $5.4 billion (+0.5%) - Social Security Administration
  - $0.8 billion (-0.2%) - Small Business Administration
  - $0.5 billion (+0.1%) - General Services Administration
  - $0.2 billion (0.0%) - Office of Personnel Management
  - $14.0 billion (0.0%) - Other Agencies
  - $0.5 billion - Other programs
