= Further Continuing and Security Assistance Appropriations Act, 2017 =

- Long title: An Act to Making appropriations for energy and water development and related agencies for the fiscal year ending September 30, 2016, and for other purposes.
- Enacted by: the 114th United States Congress
- Effective: December 10, 2016

Citations
- Public law: 114-254

Legislative history
- Introduced in the House as H.R. 2028 by Hal Rogers (R–KY) on December 8, 2016; Committee consideration by United States House Committee on Appropriations; Passed the House on December 8, 2016 (326-96); Passed the Senate on December 9, 2016 (63-36); Signed into law by President Barack Obama on December 10, 2016

The Further Continuing and Security Assistance Appropriations Act, 2017 (H.R. 2028) is a continuing resolution that extended fiscal year 2017 funding for the United States federal government from December 9, 2016 until April 28, 2017. The bill contains a boost to defense spending as well as bipartisan health programs.

== Background ==
Normally Congress must enact appropriations legislation by the beginning of the fiscal year in October. On September 28, 2016, Congress passed a continuing resolution, the Continuing Appropriations and Military Construction, Veterans Affairs, and Related Agencies Appropriation Act, 2017, and Zika Response and Preparedness Act which extended funding at the previous year's levels up to December 9, 2016.

In November 2016, shortly after the 2016 presidential election, the incoming Trump administration advocated for a second continuing resolution funding the government only until the end of March, to allow the incoming administration influence over the 2017 budget. The House Republican leadership acceded to this plan, although some lawmakers expressed concern that delaying the final appropriations legislation would distract Congress from other priorities during the beginning of Trump's administration.

== Legislative history ==
H.R. 2028 originally contained the Energy and Water Development and Related Agencies Appropriations Act, 2016, which passed the House of Representatives on May 1, 2015. Text was later stricken and replaced with the Energy and Water Development and Related Agencies Appropriations Act, 2017, which passed the Senate on May 12, 2016 and was sent back to the House.

The text was again stricken and replaced with the continuing resolution on December 8, 2016, where it was passed 326–96. The United States Senate passed the legislation the following day 63-36 just an hour before the midnight deadline, averting a potential government shutdown. The passage of the bill in the Senate was delayed after Democrats objected to the fact that an extension of health benefits for retired miners would not last until the end of the year, but a compromise was made to take up the matter in January.

== Provisions ==
As reported by The Hill, total government expenditures remain at $1.07 trillion. However the Department of Defense and Department of State will receive a combined $8 billion increase through the Overseas Contingency Operations fund, which is not subject to the spending caps of the Budget Control Act of 2011.

The bill includes $170 million for drinking water safety grants and a lead exposure registry in order to address the Flint water crisis, and a $4.1 billion flood relief package including community rebuilding grants, storm damage prevention programs, and repair of damaged highways. Also, the bill funds the 21st Century Cures Act with $872 million toward medical research, Food and Drug Administration reforms, and state grants to address the opioid epidemic.

It contains a provision making it easier for the incoming 115th Congress to temporarily reduce the amount of time after retirement a general must spend to be appointed Secretary of Defense, indirectly allowing James Mattis to assume office in 2017.

Finally, the bill corrects a drafting error made in the Consolidated Appropriations Act, 2016 regarding hours of service rules for truck drivers.

== See also ==
- List of bills in the 114th United States Congress
- 2017 United States federal budget
