= 2022 United States federal budget =

2022 Budget of the United States federal government
- Submitted by: Joe Biden
- Submitted to: 117th Congress
- Total revenue: $4.896 trillion (actual); 19.6%% of GDP
- Total expenditures: $6.272 trillion (actual); 25.1% of GDP
- Deficit: $1.375 trillion (actual); 5.5% of GDP
- Website: BUDGET OF THE U.S. GOVERNMENT

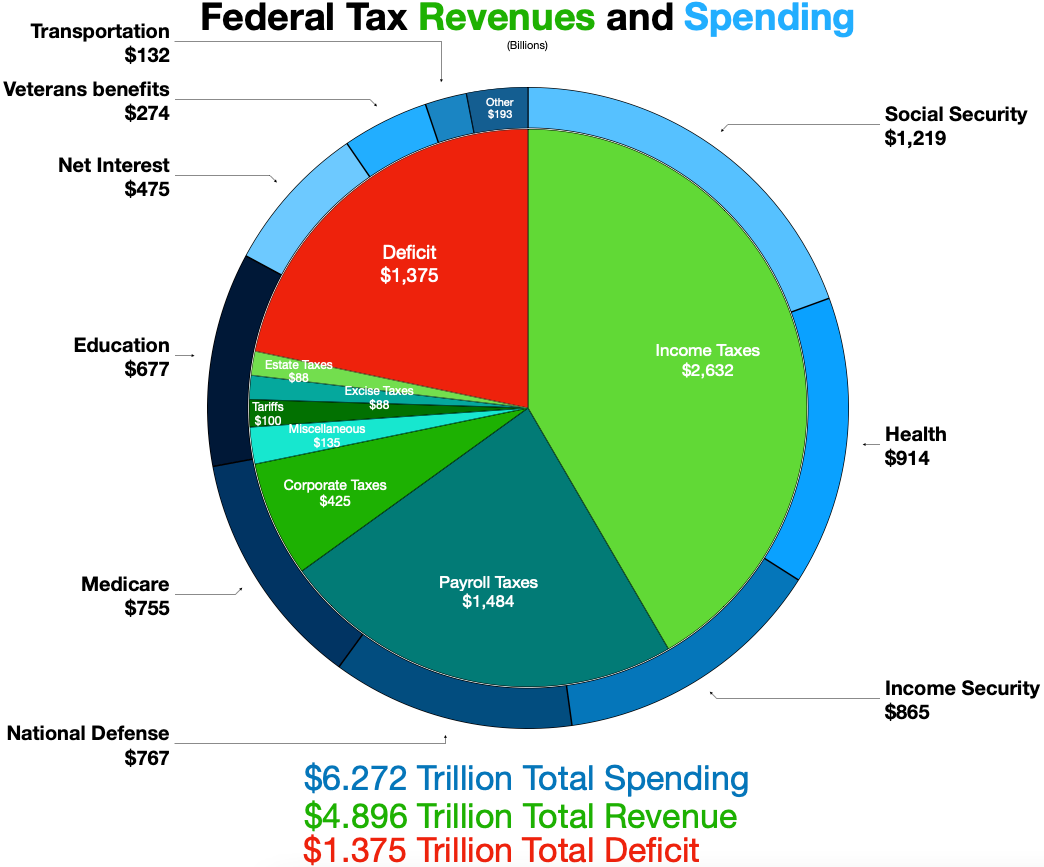
Federal budget 2022

The United States federal budget for fiscal year 2022 ran from October 1, 2021, to September 30, 2022. The government was initially funded through a series of four temporary continuing resolutions. The final funding package was passed as an omnibus spending bill, the Consolidated Appropriations Act, 2022. The Inflation Reduction Act was passed as the budget reconciliation bill for FY2022.

== Budget proposal ==
The FY2022 budget was the first to not be subject to the spending caps of the Budget Control Act of 2011 due to its expiration.

== Appropriations legislation ==
A series of three continuing resolutions were passed to initially fund government operations.

On March 9, 2022, the House of Representatives passed the Consolidated Appropriations Act, 2022 (H.R. 2471), as well as a fourth continuing resolution lasting four days (H.J.Res. 75).

== Reconciliation legislation ==
The Build Back Better Act was proposed as the budget reconciliation bill for FY2022. It evolved into the Inflation Reduction Act, which was enacted in August 2022.
