= Consolidated Appropriations Act, 2016 =

Omnibus spending bill, passed by the US Congress in 2015

- Long title: Making appropriations for military construction, the Department of Veterans Affairs, and related agencies for the fiscal year ending September 30, 2016, and for other purposes.
- Announced in: the 114th United States Congress

Codification
- Authorizations of appropriations: $1.15 trillion

Legislative history
- Introduced in the House as H.R. 2029 by Charles W. Dent (R-PA) on March 24, 2015; Passed the House on April 30, 2015 (255-163); Signed into law by President Barack Obama on December 18, 2015

The Consolidated Appropriations Act, 2016 (H.R. 2029, Pub. L. 114–113 (text) (PDF)), also known as the 2016 omnibus spending bill, is the United States appropriations legislation passed during the 114th Congress which provides spending permission to a number of federal agencies for the fiscal year of 2016. The bill authorizes $1.1 trillion in spending, as well as $700 billion in tax breaks. The bill provided funding to the federal government through September 30, 2016.

The legislation contains the Protecting Americans from Tax Hikes (PATH) Act of 2015.

== History ==
The bill began as a $78 billion spending bill for Military Construction, Veterans Affairs, and Related Agencies, one of the twelve subcommittees of the U.S. Senate Committee on Appropriations. The bill first passed the U.S. House of Representatives on April 30, 2015, by a vote of 255–163, largely along party lines. President Obama threatened to veto the legislation as written, in line with his earlier statements opposing spending bills not preventing the automatic spending cuts due to budget sequestration. The bill remained in the U.S. Senate for several months, deliberately stalled by Senate Democrats.

Facing a possible government shutdown on September 30, 2015 (the end of fiscal year 2015), Congress passed the Continuing Appropriations Resolution, 2016 hours before the deadline, funding the government until December 11. Republican congressional leaders and President Obama on October 26 reached a tentative deal that would modestly increase spending over two years while cutting some social programs. The Senate voted on the bill on November 10, 2015, passing it unanimously, 93–0. As the new December 11 deadline approached, Congress actively negotiated a wider omnibus bill built on top of the original bill. Congress passed two additional temporary extensions, pushing the deadline back to December 16, and then to December 22.

The bill entered into law on December 18, 2015. The bill ended up largely as a compromise between centrist Republicans and moderate Democrats; the scope of the bill's spending was heavily criticized by the conservative wing of the Republican Party.

== Provisions ==
The bill provides general spending for most of the U.S. federal government. The bill included a larger than expected $19.3 billion in funding for NASA.

Tax cuts included delaying implementation of taxes on premium health care plans, as well as upcoming taxes on medical devices.

Unrelated policy riders included ending a 40-year-old ban on U.S. exports of crude oil. The bill also included the provisions of the Cybersecurity Information Sharing Act, information sharing cyber-security legislation.

== See also ==
- 2015 United States federal appropriations
- United States budget sequestration in 2013
- Planned Parenthood 2015 undercover videos controversy
