= Consolidated Appropriations Act, 2017 =

United States appropriation law

Continuing Appropriations Resolution, 2017
- Long title: Making appropriations for the fiscal year ending September 30, 2017, and for other purposes.
- Announced in: the 115th United States Congress

Codification
- Authorizations of appropriations: $1.1 trillion

Legislative history
- Introduced in the House as H.R. 244 by Paul Cook (R-CA) on January 4, 2017; Passed the House on February 13, 2017 (409-1); Passed the Senate on March 21, 2017 (Unanimous consent) with amendment; House agreed to Senate amendment on May 3, 2017 (309-118) with further amendment; Senate agreed to House amendment on May 4, 2017 (79-18); Signed into law by President Donald Trump on May 5, 2017

The Consolidated Appropriations Act of 2017 (H.R. 244, Pub. L. 115–31 (text) (PDF)), also known as the 2017 omnibus spending bill, is a United States appropriations legislation passed during the 115th Congress. It provides spending permission to several federal agencies for fiscal year 2017, and it authorizes $1.1 trillion in spending.

== Provisions ==
The Consolidated Appropriations Act, 2017 authorized $100 million for the "Countering Russian Influence Fund", to counter "Russian influence and aggression" and to "support civil society organizations in Europe and Eurasia". It also included a measure imposing new restrictions and oversight on Russian diplomats in the United States.

The Act also includes provisions that no appropriated funds may be used to support the Russian annexation of Crimea and assist Crimea, if such assistance includes the participation of Russian Government officials, or other Russian owned or controlled financial entities. It also states that no funds may be used to support "the Russian occupation of the Georgian territories of Abkhazia and Tskhinvali Region/South Ossetia" or to assist the central governments of other countries that have recognized the two territories' independence.

== Key Factors ==
1. The act provided $8.1 billion in emergency funding for Hurricane Harvey and Hurricane Irma disaster relief efforts.
2. The act included supplies focused at preventing the spread of the Zika virus and providing funding for the fight against opioid abuse.
