= United States Senate Appropriations Subcommittee on Military Construction, Veterans Affairs, and Related Agencies =

US Senate subcommittee

U.S. Senate Appropriations Subcommittee on Military Construction and Veterans Affairs is one of twelve subcommittees of the U.S. Senate Committee on Appropriations. The United States Senate Committee on Appropriations has joint jurisdiction with the United States House Committee on Appropriations over all appropriations bills in the United States Congress. Each committee has 12 matching subcommittees, each of which is tasked with working on one of the twelve annual regular appropriations bills.

== Appropriations process ==
Traditionally, after a federal budget for the upcoming fiscal year has been passed, the appropriations subcommittees receive information about what the budget sets as their spending ceilings. This is called "302(b) allocations" after section 302(b) of the Congressional Budget Act of 1974. That amount is separated into smaller amounts for each of the twelve Subcommittees. The federal budget does not become law and is not signed by the President. Instead, it is a guide for the House and the Senate in making appropriations and tax decisions. However, no budget is required and each chamber has procedures in place for what to do without one. The House and Senate now consider appropriations bills simultaneously, although originally the House went first. The House Committee on Appropriations usually reports the appropriations bills in May and June and the Senate in June. Any differences between appropriations bills passed by the House and the Senate are resolved in the fall.

== Appropriations bills ==
An appropriations bill is a bill that appropriates (gives to, sets aside for) money to specific federal government departments, agencies, and programs. The money provides funding for operations, personnel, equipment, and activities. Regular appropriations bills are passed annually, with the funding they provide covering one fiscal year. The fiscal year is the accounting period of the federal government, which runs from October 1 to September 30 of the following year.

There are three types of appropriations bills: regular appropriations bills, continuing resolutions, and supplemental appropriations bills. Regular appropriations bills are the twelve standard bills that cover the funding for the federal government for one fiscal year and that are supposed to be enacted into law by October 1. If Congress has not enacted the regular appropriations bills by the time, it can pass a continuing resolution, which continues the pre-existing appropriations at the same levels as the previous fiscal year (or with minor modifications) for a set amount of time. The third type of appropriations bills is supplemental appropriations bills, which add additional funding above and beyond what was originally appropriated at the beginning of the fiscal year. Supplemental appropriations bills can be used for things like disaster relief.

Appropriations bills are one part of a larger United States budget and spending process. They are preceded in that process by the president's budget proposal, congressional budget resolutions, and the 302(b) allocation. Article One of the United States Constitution, section 9, clause 7, states that "No money shall be drawn from the Treasury, but in Consequence of Appropriations made by Law..." This is what gives Congress the power to make these appropriations. The President, however, still has the power to veto appropriations bills.

== Jurisdiction ==
This subcommittee is responsible for funding the Department of Veterans Affairs and all construction activities within the Department of Defense, including military family housing. It also funds activities related to base closures and realignments, the Armed Forces Retirement Home, the American Battle Monuments Commission, and the U.S. Court of Appeals for Veterans Claims

== Members, 119th Congress ==
Majority	Minority
John Boozman, Arkansas, Chair; Mitch McConnell, Kentucky; Lisa Murkowski, Alaska; John Hoeven, North Dakota; Susan Collins, Maine; Bill Hagerty, Tennessee; Deb Fischer, Nebraska; Mike Rounds, South Dakota; Cindy Hyde-Smith, Mississippi (until July 22, 2026); Darline Graham, South Carolina (from July 22, 2026)	Jon Ossoff, Georgia, Ranking Member; Patty Murray, Washington; Jack Reed, Rhode Island; Brian Schatz, Hawaii; Tammy Baldwin, Wisconsin; Martin Heinrich, New Mexico; Gary Peters, Michigan; Kirsten Gillibrand, New York
Ex officio

== Historical ==
Previously called the "Appropriations Subcommittee on Military Construction and Veterans Affairs," the subcommittee was responsible for funding the Department of Veterans Affairs and all construction activities within the Department of Defense, including military family housing. It also funds activities related to base closures and realignments, the American Battle Monuments Commission, and the U.S. Court of Appeals for Veterans Claims.

=== 110th Congress ===
Majority
Member	State
Tim Johnson, Chairman	South Dakota
Daniel Inouye	Hawaii
Mary Landrieu	Louisiana
Robert Byrd	West Virginia
Patty Murray	Washington
Jack Reed	Rhode Island
Ben Nelson	Nebraska

Minority
Member	State
Kay Bailey Hutchison, Ranking Member	Texas
Larry Craig	Idaho
Sam Brownback	Kansas
Wayne Allard	Colorado
Mitch McConnell	Kentucky
Bob Bennett	Utah

=== 117th Congress ===
Majority	Minority
Martin Heinrich, New Mexico, Chair; Brian Schatz, Hawaii; Jon Tester, Montana; Patty Murray, Washington; Jack Reed, Rhode Island; Tammy Baldwin, Wisconsin; Chris Coons, Delaware; Joe Manchin, West Virginia	John Boozman, Arkansas, Ranking Member; Mitch McConnell, Kentucky; Lisa Murkowski, Alaska; John Hoeven, North Dakota; Susan Collins, Maine; Shelley Moore Capito, West Virginia; Marco Rubio, Florida; Bill Hagerty, Tennessee
Ex officio
Patrick Leahy, Vermont	Richard Shelby, Alabama

=== 118th Congress ===
Majority	Minority
Patty Murray, Washington, Chair; Brian Schatz, Hawaii; Jon Tester, Montana; Martin Heinrich, New Mexico; Jack Reed, Rhode Island; Tammy Baldwin, Wisconsin; Chris Coons, Delaware (until October 27, 2023); Joe Manchin, West Virginia; Gary Peters, Michigan; Kyrsten Sinema, Arizona (from October 17, 2023)	John Boozman, Arkansas, Ranking Member; Mitch McConnell, Kentucky; Lisa Murkowski, Alaska; John Hoeven, North Dakota; Susan Collins, Maine; Deb Fischer, Nebraska; Marco Rubio, Florida; Bill Hagerty, Tennessee
Ex officio
