= Excise, Overhead, Handling =

American initialism

"Excise, Overhead, Handling" was an abbreviation that appeared on some automotive bills of sale prior to 1971. It appeared as the initialism E.O.H., referring to a federal excise tax on motor vehicles and, in some contexts, dealer overhead and handling charges.

During the 1950s, the tax was 10% of the wholesale price of the vehicle and was used for highway construction. It was reduced to 6-7% during the '60s and then repealed in 1971.
