= Omnibus spending bill =

Type of appropriations bill

An omnibus spending bill is a type of bill in the United States that packages many of the smaller ordinary appropriations bills into one larger single bill that can be passed with only one vote in each house of Congress. There are twelve different ordinary appropriations bills that need to be passed each year (one for each appropriations sub-committee) to fund the federal government and avoid a government shutdown. An omnibus spending bill combines two or more of those bills into a single bill.

Regular appropriations bills are typically written, debated, and passed by the House and the Senate during the summer. However, these versions can be different, especially if different parties control each chamber. The omnibus negotiating process takes place later in the year, and involves reconciling differences in the various bills so that an identical, combined appropriations bill can pass both chambers and avert a government shutdown.

== Appropriations process ==
Every year, Congress must pass bills that appropriate money for all discretionary government spending. Generally, one bill is passed for each sub-committee of the twelve subcommittees in the U.S. House Committee on Appropriations and the matching 12 subcommittees in the United States Senate Committee on Appropriations.

When Congress does not or cannot produce separate bills in a timely fashion, it will roll many of the separate appropriations bills into one omnibus spending bill. The deadline could be the start of the next fiscal year, October 1, or it could be some other deadline when appropriations would otherwise run out (such as a deadline set by a continuing resolution). The fiscal year of the United States is the 12-month period beginning on October 1 and ending on September 30 of the next calendar year.

Some of the reasons that Congress might not complete all the separate bills include partisan disagreement, disagreement amongst members of the same political party, and too much work on other bills. According to Walter J. Oleszek, a political science professor and "senior specialist in American national government at the Congressional Research Service", omnibus bills have become more popular since the 1980s because "party and committee leaders can package or bury controversial provisions in one massive bill to be voted up or down."

Omnibus bills can also be used to "veto-proof" items, by including measures that the president is expected to veto if they were submitted for signature on their own, but who is willing or pressured into signing an omnibus bill that includes those measures.

=== Minibus ===
A "minibus" (short for "mini-omnibus") is a spending bill which provides funding for multiple sectors of the federal government, but not for all of them.

=== Cromnibus ===
A "cromnibus" (portmanteau of "CR" and "omnibus") is a bill setting new funding levels for certain sectors of the federal government, while renewing the previous fiscal year's ones for others.

== Criticism ==
In Congressional Procedures and the Policy Process, Walter Oleszek describes omnibus measures as follows:

Packaging all or a number of appropriation bills together creates what are called omnibus or minibus measures. These bills appropriate money to operate the federal government and make national policy in scores of areas. These omnibus bills grant large powers to a small number of people who put these packages together - party and committee leaders and top executive officials. Omnibus measures usually arouse the ire of the rank-and-file members of Congress because typically little time is available in the final days of a session to debate these massive measures or to know what is in them. Absent enactment of annual appropriation bills or a CR, federal agencies must shut down, furloughing their employees. Moreover, "uncertainty about final appropriations leads many [federal] managers to hoard funds; in some cases, hiring and purchasing stops.

Often, omnibus spending bills are criticized for being full of pork (unnecessary/wasteful spending that pleases constituents or special interest groups). The bills regularly stretch to more than 1,000 pages. Nevertheless, such bills have grown more common in recent years.

In December 2004, the 3,016-page $388 billion Consolidated Appropriations Act, 2005 became known for its size, its earmarks inserted in the final stages that represented 4% of the $388 billion, its non-appropriations provisions, its controversial content, and for being rushed through at the last minute. It was drafted by the House in less than 24 hours and then pushed through the Senate. It contained "complex and controversial matters" which included nine bills, only two of which had been debated in the Senate, and a conference report (a bill reconciled between the two chambers in a conference committee) with 32 unrelated provisions that the Senate had never considered.

In 2009, a $410 billion omnibus bill, the Omnibus Appropriations Act, 2009 (H.R. 1105), became a point of controversy due to its $8 billion in earmarks. On March 11, the bill was signed by U.S. President Barack Obama into law as Pub. L. 111–8 (text) (PDF).

== Examples ==
- Omnibus Consolidated and Emergency Appropriations Act, 1999
- Consolidated Appropriations Act, 2005
- Consolidated Appropriations Act, 2008
- Omnibus Appropriations Act, 2009
- Consolidated Appropriations Act, 2010
- Consolidated Appropriations Act, 2012
- Consolidated and Further Continuing Appropriations Act, 2013
- Consolidated Appropriations Act, 2014
- Consolidated and Further Continuing Appropriations Act, 2015
- Consolidated Appropriations Act, 2016
- Consolidated Appropriations Act, 2017
- Consolidated Appropriations Act, 2018
- Consolidated Appropriations Act, 2019, Pub. L. 116–6 (text) (PDF),H.J.Res. 31
- Consolidated Appropriations Act, 2021
- Consolidated Appropriations Act, 2022
- Consolidated Appropriations Act, 2023

== See also ==
- Appropriations bill (United States)
- Omnibus bill
- 2011 United States federal budget
- 2012 United States federal budget
- One Big Beautiful Bill Act
