= Excise tax in the United States =

Indirect tax on listed items in the US

Excise tax in the United States is an indirect tax on listed items. Excise taxes can be and are made by federal, state, and local governments and are not uniform throughout the United States. Certain goods, such as gasoline, diesel fuel, alcohol, and tobacco products, are taxed by multiple governments simultaneously. Some excise taxes are collected from the producer or retailer and not paid directly by the consumer, and as such, often remain "hidden" in the price of a product or service rather than being listed separately.

== Federal excise taxes and revenues ==
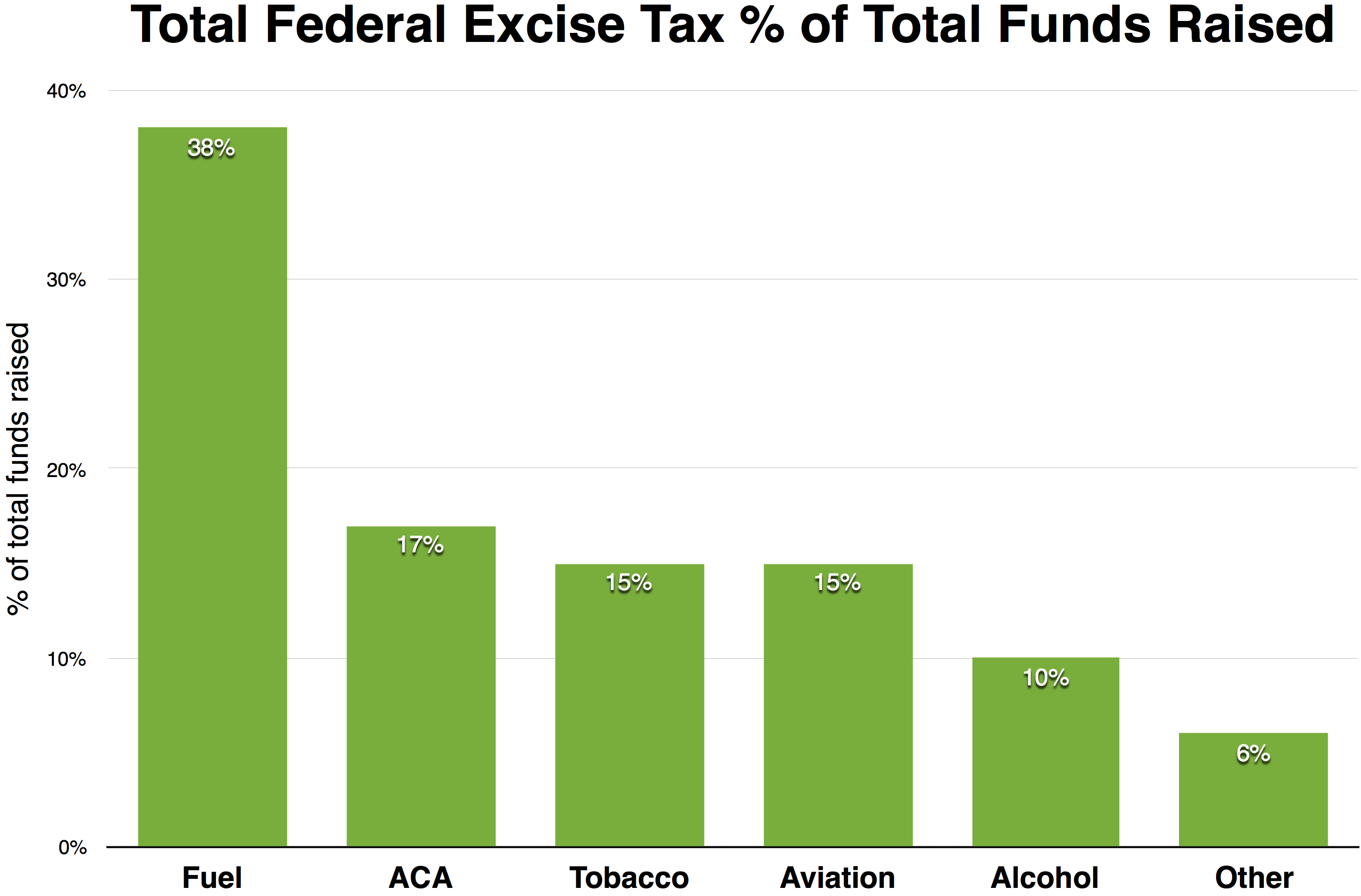
Excise taxes percentage 2015

Federal excise taxes raised $86.8 billion in fiscal year 2020 or 2.5% of total federal tax revenue.

=== Fuel ===
Federal excise taxes have been stable at 18.4¢ per gallon for gasoline and 24.4¢ per gallon for diesel fuel since 1993. This raised $37.4 billion in fiscal year 2015. These fuel taxes raised 90% of the Highway Trust Fund. The average of state taxes on fuel was 31.02¢ per gallon for gasoline and 32.66¢ per gallon for diesel fuel in 2021. However, most states exempt gasoline from general sales taxes. The total state and federal taxes are relatively low compared to other industrialized countries, already without consideration of the sales tax rebate.

=== Airport & airway trust fund ===
Excise taxes dedicated to the Airport and Airway Trust Fund raised $9.0 billion in fiscal year 2020, down from $16.0 billion in fiscal year 2019. 90% of the excise tax revenue comes from taxing passenger air fares, and the remaining 10% comes from air cargo and aviation fuel taxes.

=== Affordable Care Act excise taxes ===
Excise taxes for the Affordable Care Act (ACA) raised $16.3 billion in fiscal year 2015. $11.3 billion was an excise tax placed directly on health insurers based on their market share. The ACA was going to impose a 40% "Cadillac tax" on expensive Employer-sponsored health insurance, but that was postponed until 2018, and later further postponed and eventually repealed before its rollout on December 20, 2019. Annual excise taxes totaling $3 billion were levied on importers and manufacturers of prescription drugs. An excise tax of 2.32% on medical devices and a 10% excise tax on indoor tanning services are applied as well. The same budget bill that repealed the Cadillac tax also repealed the medical device tax for all sales occurring after December 31.

=== Tobacco ===
Excise taxes on tobacco raised $12.4 billion in fiscal year 2020. The tax equals $1.01 per pack of 20 of cigarettes. Federal excise tax revenue from tobacco products peaked in fiscal year 2010 at $17.2 billion after the increase in tobacco product tax rates in the Children's Health Insurance Program Reauthorization Act of 2009. This tax increase, which took effect in April 2009, was the most recent time federal tobacco tax rates were changed. The federal tobacco product excise tax does not apply to certain products, including electronic cigarettes.

=== Alcohol ===
Excise taxes on alcoholic beverages raised $9.5 billion in fiscal year 2020.

=== Cannabis ===
In 2020, state and local governments earned over $3 billion in tax revenue from cannabis taxes.

== Constitutional law ==
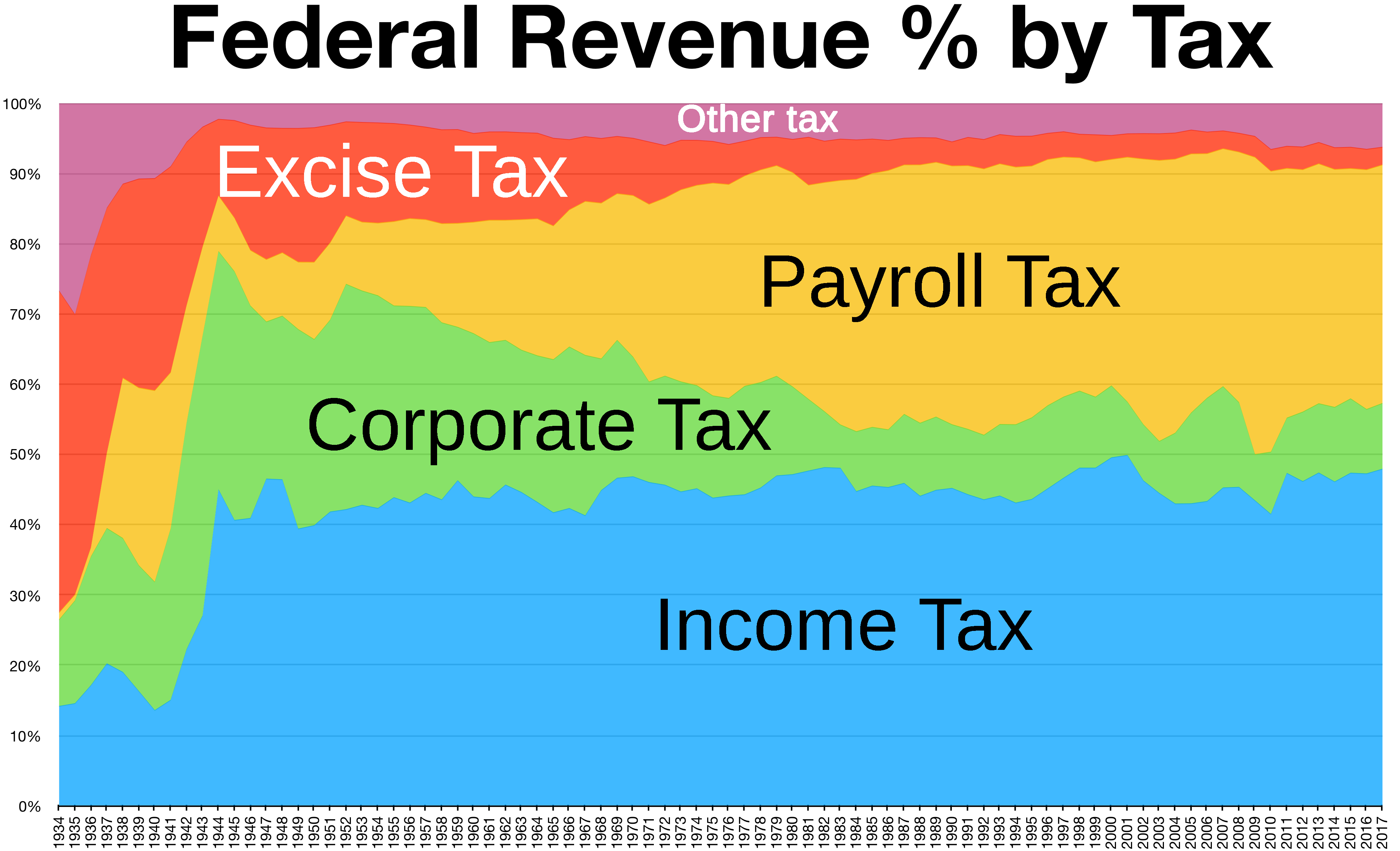
Historical tax revenue by source.

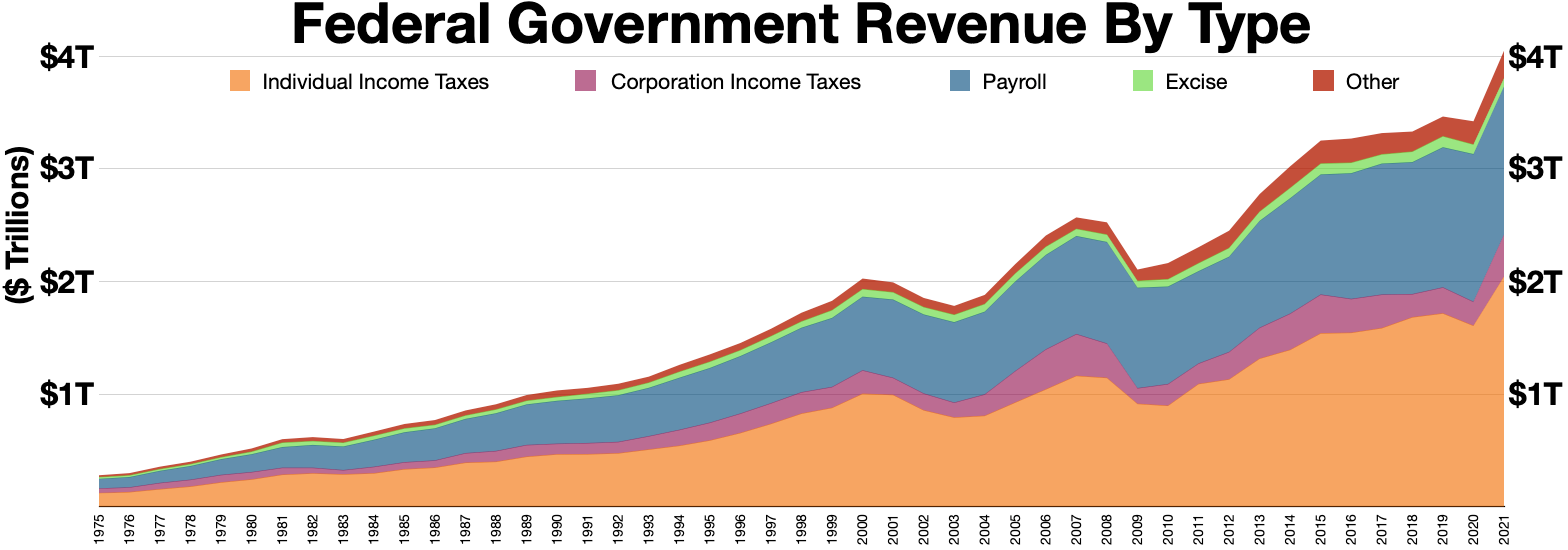
Federal Government revenue by type Other Excise tax Payroll tax Corporate tax Personal Income Tax

The U.S. Constitution, ratified in 1789, gave the federal government authority to tax, stating that Congress has the power to

... lay and collect taxes, duties, imposts and excises, to pay the debts and provide for the common defense and general welfare of the United States;

Tariffs between states are prohibited by the U.S. Constitution, and all domestically made products can be imported or shipped to another state tax-free. In the U.S. constitutional law sense, an excise tax is usually an event tax (as opposed to a state of being tax). A recent exception to this "state of being" principle is the "minimum essential coverage" tax under Internal Revenue Code section 5000A as enacted by the Patient Protection and Affordable Care Act (Public Law 111–148), whereby a tax penalty is imposed as an indirect tax on the condition of not having health insurance coverage; as reasoned by Chief Justice John Roberts in National Federation of Independent Business v. Sebelius: "it is triggered by specific circumstances."

Federal excise taxes are also required by the U.S. Constitution (Article 1, Section 8) to be uniform throughout the United States:

...all duties, imposts and excises shall be uniform throughout the United States.

== Historical background ==
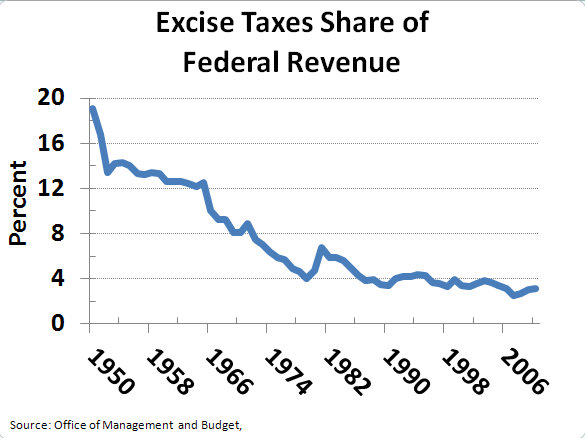
Excise taxes as a share of federal revenue 1950–2007.

Federal excise taxes have a storied background in the United States. Responding to an urgent need for revenue following the American Revolutionary War, after the ninth state ratified the U.S. Constitution in 1788 the newly elected First United States Congress passed, and President George Washington, signed the Tariff Act of July 4, 1789, which authorized the collection of tariff duties (customs) on imported goods. Tariffs and excise taxes were authorized by the United States Constitution and recommended by the first U.S. Secretary of the Treasury, Alexander Hamilton, in 1789, to tax foreign imports. Hamilton thought it was important to start the U.S. federal government out on a sound financial basis with good credit and a regular, easily collected source of revenue. Customs duties (tariffs) on imported goods, as set by tariff rates, were the source of about 80–95% of all federal revenue up to 1860. Having just fought a war over taxation (among other things), the U.S. Congress wanted a reliable source of income that was relatively unobtrusive, brought in enough money to pay off the debt and pay for the relatively low-cost federal government (at the time) and be relatively easy to collect. Tariffs met all these criteria.

In addition to tariffs, low excise taxes were imposed to provide the federal government with some additional money to pay part of its operating expenses and to help redeem at full value U.S. federal debts and the debts the states had accumulated during the American Revolutionary War.

The first federal budget was about $4.6 million, and the population in the 1790 U.S. census was about four million, so the average federal tax was about $1/person per year. At that time, tradespeople earned about $0.25 a day for a 10- to 12-hour day so that federal taxes could be paid with about four days of work. Paying even this was usually optional, as taxed imports listed on the tariff lists could usually be avoided by buying domestic products if desired.

Table of historical excise taxes collected by the federal government (dollar amounts are in millions)
Year	Tariff Income	Receipts % Tariff	Federal Receipts	Income Tax	Payroll Tax	Receipts % Excise
1792	$4.4	95.0%	$4.6	$-	$-	4.7%
1795	$5.6	91.6%	$6.1	$-	$-	5.5%
1800	$9.1	83.7%	$10.8	$-	$-	7.5%
1805	$12.9	95.4%	$13.6	$-	$-	0.2%
1810	$8.6	91.5%	$9.4	$-	$-	1.1%
1815	$7.3	46.4%	$15.7	$-	$-	29.7%
1820	$15.0	83.9%	$17.9	$-	$-	0.6%
1825	$20.1	97.9%	$20.5	$-	$-	0.1%
1830	$21.9	88.2%	$24.8	$-	$-	0.0%
1835	$19.4	54.1%	$35.8	$-	$-	0.0%
1840	$12.5	64.2%	$19.5	$-	$-	0.0%
1845	$27.5	91.9%	$30.0	$-	$-	0.0%
1850	$39.7	91.0%	$43.6	$-	$-	0.0%
1855	$53.0	81.2%	$65.4	$-	$-	0.0%
1860	$53.2	94.9%	$56.1	$-	$-	0.0%
1863	$63.0	55.9%	$112.7	$-	$-	0.0%
1864	$102.3	38.7%	$264.6	$-	$-	0.0%
1865	$84.9	25.4%	$333.7	$61.0	$-	63.2%
1870	$194.5	47.3%	$411.3	$37.8	$-	44.7%
1875	$157.2	54.6%	$288.0	$-	$-	38.2%
1880	$184.5	55.3%	$333.5	$-	$-	37.2%
1885	$181.5	56.1%	$323.7	$-	$-	34.7%
1890	$229.7	57.0%	$403.1	$-	$-	35.4%
1900	$233.2	41.1%	$567.2	$-	$-	51.0%
1910	$233.7	34.6%	$675.2	$-	$-	42.8%
1913	$318.8	44.0%	$724.1	$35.0	$-	47.5%
1915	$209.8	30.1%	$697.9	$47.0	$-	59.5%
1916	$213.7	27.3%	$782.5	$121.0	$-	0.0%
1917	$225.9	20.1%	$1,124.3	$373.0	$-	0.0%
1918	$947.0	25.8%	$3,664.6	$2,720.0	$-	0.0%
1920	$886.0	13.2%	$6,694.6	$4,032.0	$-	0.0%
1925	$547.6	14.5%	$3,780.1	$1,697.0	$-	0.0%
1928	$566.0	14.0%	$4,042.3	$2,088.0	$-	13.3%
1930	$587.0	14.1%	$4,177.9	$2,300.0	$-	13.5%
1935	$318.8	8.4%	$3,800.5	$1,100.0	$-	35.9%
1940	$331.0	6.1%	$5,387.1	$2,100.0	$800.0	34.2%
1942	$369.0	2.9%	$12,799.1	$7,900.0	$1,200.0	32.5%
1944	$417.0	0.9%	$44,148.9	$34,400.0	$1,900.0	13.1%
1946	$424.0	0.9%	$46,400.0	$28,000.0	$1,900.0	15.1%
1948	$408.0	0.9%	$47,300.0	$29,000.0	$2,500.0	15.6%
1950	$407.0	0.9%	$43,800.0	$26,200.0	$3,000.0	17.2%
1951	$609.0	1.1%	$56,700.0	$35,700.0	$4,100.0	15.3%
1955	$585.0	0.8%	$71,900.0	$46,400.0	$6,100.0	12.7%
1960	$1,105.0	1.1%	$99,800.0	$62,200.0	$12,200.0	11.7%
1965	$1,442.0	1.2%	$116,800.0	$74,300.0	$22,200.0	12.5%
1970	$2,430.0	1.3%	$192,800.0	$123,200.0	$44,400.0	8.1%
1975	$3,676.0	1.3%	$279,100.0	$163,000.0	$84,500.0	5.9%
1980	$7,174.0	1.4%	$517,100.0	$308,700.0	$157,800.0	4.7%
1985	$12,079.0	1.6%	$734,000.0	$395,900.0	$255,200.0	4.9%
1990	$11,500.0	1.1%	$1,032,000.0	$560,400.0	$380,000.0	3.4%
1995	$19,301.0	1.4%	$1,361,000.0	$747,200.0	$484,500.0	4.2%
2000	$19,914.0	1.0%	$2,025,200.0	$1,211,700.0	$652,900.0	3.4%
2005	$23,379.0	1.1%	$2,153,600.0	$1,205,500.0	$794,100.0	3.4%
2010	$25,298.0	1.2%	$2,162,700.0	$1,090,000.0	$864,800.0	3.1%
Notes: All dollar amounts are in millions of U.S. dollars. Income taxes include individual and corporate taxes. Federal expenditures often exceed revenue by temporary borrowings. Initially the U.S. Federal Government was financed mainly by customs (tariffs). Average excise % is calculated by dividing excise revenue by total revenue. Other taxes collected are income tax, corporate income tax, inheritance, Tariffs, often called customs or duties on imports, etc. Income taxes began in 1913 with the passage of the 16th Amendment. Payroll taxes are Social Security and Medicare taxes. Payroll taxes began in 1940. Many federal government excise taxes are assigned to trust funds, collected for and "dedicated" to a particular trust. Sources: Historical Statistics of the United States 1789–1945; Bicentennial Edition Historical Statistics of the United States Series 1790–1970; U.S. Census Trade Statistics; Whitehouse Historical Tables 1940–2016

Congress set low excise taxes on only a few goods, such as whiskey, rum, tobacco, snuff and refined sugar. These low excise taxes accounted for only a small percentage of the federal income (see table on U.S. Historical Taxes). Tariffs (custom duties) were initially by far the largest source of federal revenue. The excise tax on whiskey was so despised by western farmers who had no easy way to transport their bulky grain harvests to market without converting them into alcohol that it led to the Whiskey Rebellion, which had to be quelled by President Washington calling up the militia and suppressing the rebellious farmers, all of whom were later pardoned. In the days before steamboats, canals, railroads, etc., bulky cargo could not economically be shipped far. The whiskey excise tax collected so little and was so despised that it was abolished by President Thomas Jefferson in 1802.

In the Napoleonic Wars and the War of 1812, the imports and tariff taxes in the United States plummeted, and Congress in 1812 brought back the excise tax on whiskey to partially compensate for the loss of customs/tariff revenue. Within a few years, customs duties brought in enough federal income to abolish nearly all federal taxes except tariffs again. When the United States public debt was finally paid off in 1834, President Andrew Jackson abolished the excise taxes and reduced the customs duties (tariffs) in half.

Excise taxes stayed essentially zero until the American Civil War brought a need for much more federal revenue. Excise taxes were reintroduced on a wider range of items, and income taxes were introduced. Progressive activists, including the temperance movement, successfully lobbied for the 16th Amendment establishing a federal income tax to reduce the government's dependence on alcohol taxes for revenue.

By about 1916, the loans taken out during the Civil War were all paid off, and the excise taxes were again set very low. On January 16, 1919, the 18th Amendment was passed, and alcohol production, sale, and transport were prohibited. Taxing alcohol products would have produced almost no income, given that alcohol sales and production had gone underground. All federal excise taxes remained practically zero for the next ten years.

During the Great Depression (1929–1939), President Franklin D. Roosevelt and Congress started reintroducing excise taxes to increase federal income, which had dropped because of the much lower incomes and the resulting lower income tax collections. On December 5, 1933, the 21st Amendment was ratified, and alcohol production became legal again. The healthy excise tax on now-legal alcoholic beverages paid about one-third of all federal taxes during the Great Depression.

Excise taxes have become an established part of the general budget and the source of funds for various trusts. The U.S. has expanded the definition of items on the excise tax lists as trusts for highways, airports, vaccines, black lung, oil spills, etc. have been set up. Excise taxes on fuels, tickets, vaccines, coal, oil, etc. finance these.

== Excise tax types ==
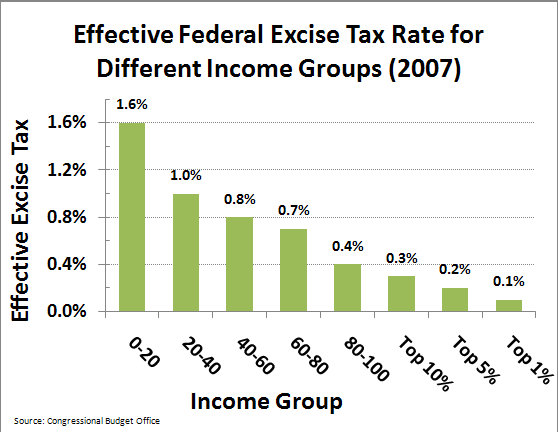
The effective federal excise tax rate for different household income groups (2007). The effective tax rate equals total federal excise taxes paid during the year divided by total comprehensive income, including estimated values of Medicare and health benefits, food stamps, employment taxes on employers, imputed corporate income tax, and other non-taxable items. Excise taxes are 0.7% of all federal taxes collected.

For purposes of the U.S. Constitution, an excise tax can be broadly defined as any indirect tax (usually, a tax on an event). In this sense, an excise means any tax other than: (1) a property tax or ad valorem tax because of its ownership; (2) a tax per head tax or capitation tax by being present (very rare in the United States).

In this broad sense, income taxes, value added taxes (VATs), sales taxes, and transfer taxes are examples of other excise taxes but are typically not called excise taxes (in the United States) because of the different ways they are imposed. In the United States, the only excise taxes are the taxes on quantities of enumerated items (whiskey, wine, tobacco, gasoline, tires, etc.). Other taxes on specific events may technically be considered excise taxes in the broad sense but may or may not be collected under the name "excise tax", where the term is used in a different, more narrow sense.

In the more narrow sense, taxes denominated as "excise" taxes are usually taxes on events, such as the purchase of a quantity of a particular item like gasoline, diesel fuel, beer, liquor, wine, cigarettes, airline tickets, tires, trucks, etc. These taxes are usually included in the item's price, not listed separately like sales taxes usually are. To minimize tax accounting complications, the excise tax is generally imposed on quantities like gallons of fuel, wine or drinking alcohol, packets of cigarettes, etc. It is usually paid initially by the manufacturer or retailer.

The burdens of excise taxes are often passed on to the consumer, who eventually consumes the product. The price for which the item is ultimately sold is not generally considered in calculating the excise tax amount.

An example of a state of being tax is an ad valorem property tax—which is not an excise. Customs or tariffs are based on the property (usually imported goods) as a state of being or ad valorem taxes and are also typically not called excise taxes. Excise taxes are collected by producers and retailers and paid to the Internal Revenue Service (IRS) or other state or local government tax collection agency. Historical federal excise tax collections to 1945 are listed in the Historical Statistics of the United States and more recent federal excise tax data is listed in the White House historical tables.

An excise is imposed on listed specific taxable events or products and is usually not collected or paid directly by the consumer. Excise taxes are collected by the producer or retailer and delivered to the IRS, state or local tax agency. The producer can usually pass at least some of the excise tax burden to the consumer, the amount of which is added to the price of the product when it is sold. The degree to which consumers and producers will share the burden, called tax incidence, depends upon the price elasticities of supply and demand. Often, sales taxes are collected as a percentage of the cost of the product, including its excise tax—a tax on a tax.

Traditionally, the federal government has left property and sales taxes to the states and local governments for their revenue. Tariffs or customs duties on imported goods are essentially the only property taxes imposed by the U.S. federal government. Tariffs can be set only by the federal government, not by any state or local jurisdiction. A customs duty or tariff is nominally separate from an excise tax for U.S. constitutional law purposes. Excise taxes can be (and are) set by federal, state, and local jurisdictions.

Many taxes are called an excise tax in the statute imposing that tax (an excise in the statutory law sense) even though they could more accurately be called some other kind of tax. Different taxes have accumulated over the years under the excise tax classification.

Table of excise tax collection by type of excise tax (2010) (dollar amounts are in millions)
2010 Excise Taxes	Millions	Percent
Alcohol	$9,229.0	13.8%
Tobacco	$17,160.0	25.6%
Telephone	$993.0	1.5%
Transportation fuels	$(11,030.0)	−16.5%
Other	$1,904.0	2.8%
Total	$18,256.0	27.3%
Trust funds:
Transportation	$34,992.0	52.3%
Airport and airway	$10,612.0	15.9%
Black lung disability	$595.0	0.9%
Inland waterway	$74.0	0.1%
Oil spill liability	$476.0	0.7%
Aquatic resources	$580.0	0.9%
Leaking underground storage tank	$169.0	0.3%
Tobacco Assessments	$937.0	1.4%
Vaccine injury compensation	$218.0	0.3%
Total Trusts	$48,653.0	72.7%
Total, Excise Taxes	$66,909.0	
Notes: All dollar amounts are in millions of U.S. dollars Some Excise taxes are assigned to Trust Funds and are collected for and "dedicated" to the Trust.

Often, trust funds do not collect enough taxes because the legislators assume setting the excise tax rates and allowable trust fund projects results in underfunding. Changing consumer purchases have wronged the original assumptions, which may result in underfunding. Because many funds are allocated to repay bonds and other long-term projects, they often require an infusion of general funds to stay solvent. Long-term adjustments of tax rates or a less extensive list of allowable trust fund projects to keep the funds solvent require bi-partisan agreements, which are rare.

The excise taxes on alcoholic beverages, tobacco products and firearms are administered under the Alcohol and Tobacco Tax and Trade Bureau (TTB) in the United States Department of the Treasury. The total excise taxes on gasoline, diesel etc. for each state have been calculated.

Federal Trust Fund excise tax collections are often remitted to each state by complicated allocation plans. The Highway Trust Fund revenue is split between highways and transit systems. The Highway Account normally receives about 85% of all highway trust fund taxes, and the Mass Transit Account receives about 15% of all Highway Trust Fund excise tax collections.

The Highway Trust Fund may well require tax rate adjustments to stay solvent and make up for increasing fuel economy standards dictated by the Environmental Protection Agency or the increased use of untaxed plug-in electric vehicles. As fuel prices rise, there is a slight decrease in gallons of fuel bought as vehicles are made more efficient and/or travel shorter distances, all of which reduce Highway Trust Fund collections. Federal funding of the Highway Trust Fund is restricted for capital expenditures, such as constructing and reconstructing roads, bridges, or tunnels or paying bonds sold to finance the work.

The bulk of funding is for specific programs set up to channel aid to the states for various uses, such as providing capital for the nation's most heavily used roads, maintaining interstates, and fixing bridges. Regular maintenance on non-interstate roads, including pothole patching and snowplowing, must be funded through other sources. Funding often requires a partial dollar match by the states. The Mass Transit Account, which gets its funding from a fraction of the excise taxes imposed on fuels, etc., has similar restrictions.

== Statutory law ==
Table of U.S. excise tax rates for different products (2010) (grouped by specific trust fund)
Item	Tax Rate	Measure
General Fund Excise taxes
Small Cigarettes	$1.01	pkg 20
Cigars, large	$0.40	ea. cigar
Distilled Alcohol 80 proof	$2.14	750 ml
Wine 14% Alcohol or Less	$0.21	750 ml
Wine 14 to 21%	$0.31	750 ml
Wine 21 to 24%	$0.62	750 ml
Wine Sparkling	$0.67	750 ml
Wine Carbonated	$0.65	750 ml
Hard Cider	$0.04	750 ml
Beer	$0.05	12 oz
Pistols and Revolvers	10%	price
Other Firearms and Ammunition	11%	price
Tanning Salon	10%	price
Gas guzzler 21.5–22.5 mpg	$1,000.00	vehicle
Gas guzzler 12.5–13.5 mpg	$6,400.00	vehicle
Telephone Calls	3%	local
Wagering excise tax	2.50%	wager
Black Lung Disability Trust
Coal mined	$1.10	ton
Coal mined	4.40%	price
Coal open pit	$0.55	ton
Coal open pit	4.40%	price
Highway Trust Fund
Gasoline	$0.183	gallon
Diesel	$0.243	gallon
Alcohol fuels	$0.183	gallon
LPG fuel	$0.183	gallon
LNG fuel	$0.243	gallon
CNG fuel	$0.183	gallon
Tires over 3,500 lb. rated wt.	$0.09	10# rated wt
Heavy Trucks	12%	price
55,000–75,000 lbs. capacity	$100.00	truck/yr.
each 1000# over 55,000	$22.00	truck/yr.
over 75,000 #	$550.00	truck/yr.
Leaking Underground Storage Tank Trust
Leaking Gas storage	.1 cent	gallon
Vaccine Injury Compensation Trust Fund Excise
Vaccine	$0.75	dose
Water Transportation Passenger excise tax
Ship voyage	$3.00	passenger
Land and Water Conservation Trust Fund
Ship fuel	$0.20	gallon
Oil Spill fund
Oil	$0.08	barrel
Harbor Maintenance Trust Fund
Harbor Maintenance	0.13%	cargo
Sport Fish Restoration & Boating Trust Fund
Sport Fishing gear	10%	price
Boat Gasoline	$0.183	gallon
Boat Diesel	$0.243	gallon
Airport and Airway Trust Fund
Airline Ticket	7.50%	price
International Ticket	$16.30	ea.
Air Cargo	6.25%	charges
Comm. Aviation kerosene	$0.043	gallon
Jet Fuel	$0.218	gallon
Aviation gasoline	$0.194	gallon
Notes: Some excise taxes are assigned to Trust Funds and are collected for and "dedicated" to the Trust.

The term "excise" also has a statutory law meaning. Generally, any statute that imposes a tax denominated explicitly as an "excise" in the United States is an excise tax law. U.S. federal statutory excises are (or have been) imposed under Subtitle D ("miscellaneous excise taxes") and Subtitle E ("Alcohol, Tobacco, and Certain Other Excise Taxes") of the Internal Revenue Code, 26 U.S.C. § 4001 through 26 U.S.C. § 5891, relating to such things as luxury passenger automobiles, heavy trucks and trailers, "gas guzzler" vehicles, tires, petroleum products, coal, vaccines, recreational equipment, firearms (see National Firearms Act), communications services (see telephone federal excise tax), air transportation, policies issued by foreign insurance companies, wagering, water transportation, removal of hard mineral resources from deep seabeds, chemicals, certain imported substances, non-deductible contributions to certain employer plans, and many other subjects. The Commonwealth of Massachusetts charges what it calls an "excise tax" on all vehicles, even though this is, in fact, an ad valorem tax.

Excise duties usually have one or two purposes: to raise revenue and to discourage particular behavior or purchase of specific items. Taxes such as those on sales of fuel, alcohol, and tobacco are often "justified" on both grounds. Some economists suggest that the optimal revenue-raising taxes should be levied on sales of items having an inelastic demand; in contrast, behavior-altering taxes should be assessed where demand is elastic. Most items on the excise tax lists are relatively inelastic "addictions" with only long-term elasticity.

One of the most common excises in the United States is the cigarette tax imposed by the federal and state governments. This tax is simply an excise tax applied to each pack of cigarettes. Specifically, the federal government uniformly charges an excise tax of $1.01 for a standard pack of 20 cigarettes. On top of the federal tax, all 50 states levy a different cigarette tax that ranges from $0.17 per pack in Missouri to $4.35 per pack in New York. Overall, the excise taxes constitute most of the retail cost of cigarettes. Cigarette taxes can be avoided in some jurisdictions if consumers purchase loose tobacco and cigarette paper separately or by purchasing cigarettes from lower-taxing states.

Excise taxes can be imposed and collected at the point of production or importation or the point of sale and then remitted to the Internal Revenue Service or state or local taxing agency. The federal government often collects some excise taxes. Then, it remits to the states on a partially matching basis to pay for items like interstate highway construction, airport construction, or bridge repairs. Excise taxes are usually waived or refunded on goods being exported to encourage exports. Smugglers and other tax evaders will often seek to obtain items at a point where they are not taxed or taxed much lower and then later sell or use them at a price lower than the post-tax price in their jurisdiction.

For similar items, excise duties are the same for imported and domestically produced goods; if the tax differs, there is an explicit or implicit customs duty or tariff.

An unusual example of a state "excise" tax is found in the State of Hawaii. Instead of a sales tax, the State of Hawaii imposes a General Excise Tax, or GET, on all business activity in the State. The GET is charged at a rate of 4% for most businesses and 0.5% for wholesalers. The tax is imposed on all business entities, so the tax is collected at every level of production (material supplier to manufacturer to wholesaler to retailer.) The GET is also charged on all business service activity, such as real estate agent commissions, lawyer fees, etc. A more accurate tax term would be a value added tax or VAT.

With Hawaii's industry heavily dependent on tourism and tourist spending, the state regularly raises nearly half its government revenues through the imposition of the GET. Hawaii's GET has been criticized for having a disproportionate impact on low-income families because of the fact it is charged on intermediary transactions (such as those between wholesaler and retailer) as well as services, resulting in a pyramiding effect as costs rise with final retail prices.

== Excise tax enforcement ==
The Bureau of Alcohol, Tobacco, Firearms and Explosives (ATF), formed in 1886, is a federal law enforcement organization within the United States Department of Justice (DOJ). Its responsibilities include the investigation and prevention of federal offenses involving the unlawful use, manufacture, and possession of firearms and explosives; acts of arson and bombings; and illegal manufacturing and trafficking of alcohol and tobacco products that avoid paying the federal excise taxes on these products.

The Internal Revenue Service (IRS) within the United States Department of the Treasury is responsible for collecting over one million excise tax returns that contain almost $70 billion in excise taxes. IRS Publication 510 lists all the forms, rates, rules, etc. on federal excise tax collection. The IRS is authorized to sue people who violate the excise tax rules and have them incarcerated.

== Commentary on excises ==
Samuel Johnson's A Dictionary of the English Language defined excise in 1755 as "A hateful tax levied upon commodities, and adjudged not by the common judges of property, but wretches hired by those to whom excise is paid."

== See also ==
- Alcohol tax
- Excise, Overhead, Handling
- Fuel taxes in the United States
- Cigarette taxes in the United States
