= Vacuum tube =

Device that controls current between electrodes

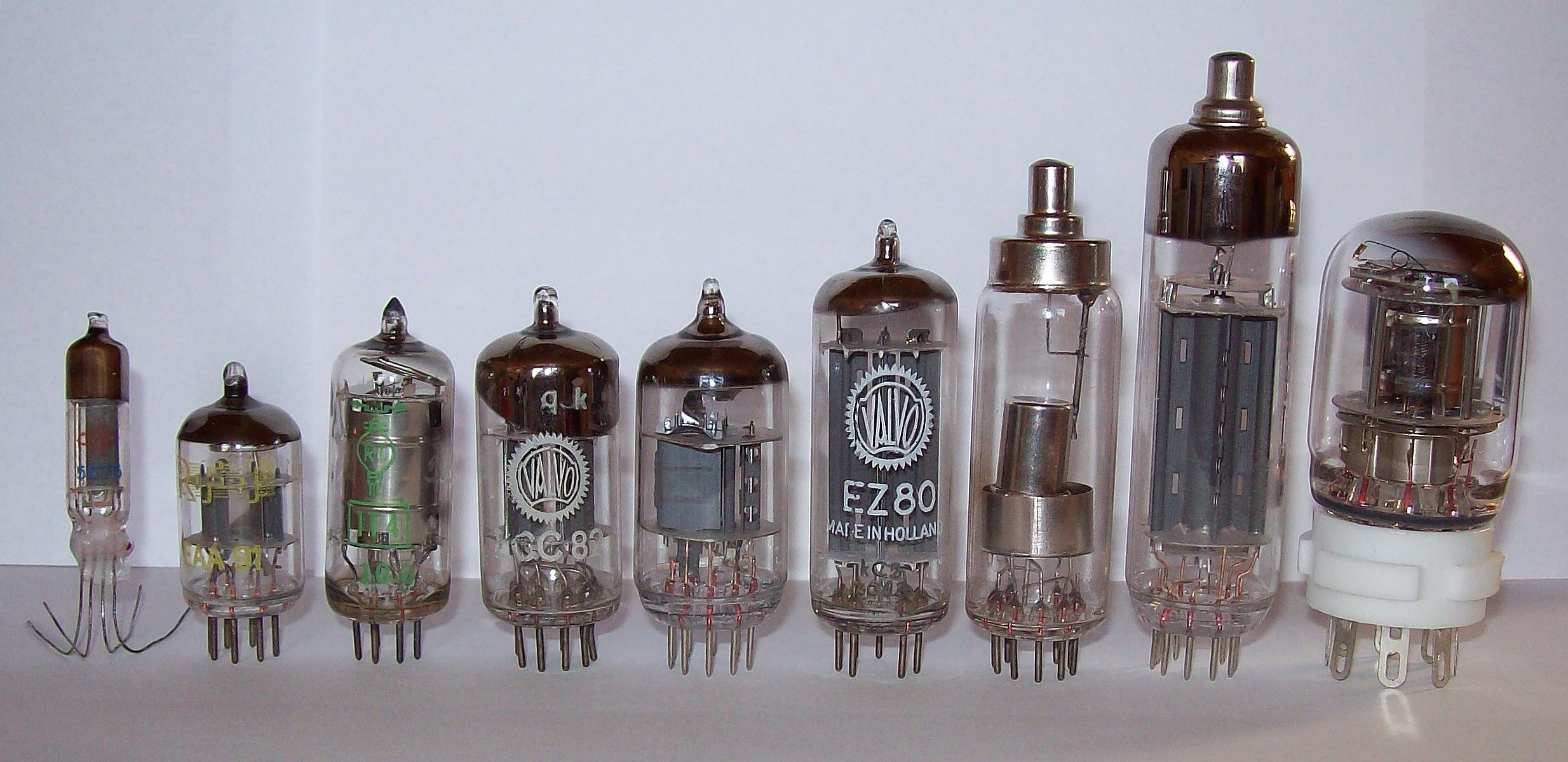
Later thermionic vacuum tubes, mostly miniature style, some with top cap connections for higher voltages

A vacuum tube, vac tube, electron tube, thermionic valve (British usage), or tube (North America) is a device that controls electric current flow in a high vacuum between electrodes to which an electric potential difference has been applied. It takes the form of an evacuated tubular envelope of glass or sometimes metal containing electrodes connected to external connection pins.

The type known as a thermionic tube or thermionic valve utilizes thermionic emission of electrons from a hot cathode for fundamental electronic functions such as signal amplification and current rectification. Non-thermionic types such as vacuum phototubes achieve electron emission through the photoelectric effect, and are used for such purposes as the detection of light and measurement of its intensity. In both types the electrons are accelerated from the cathode to the anode by the electric field in the tube.

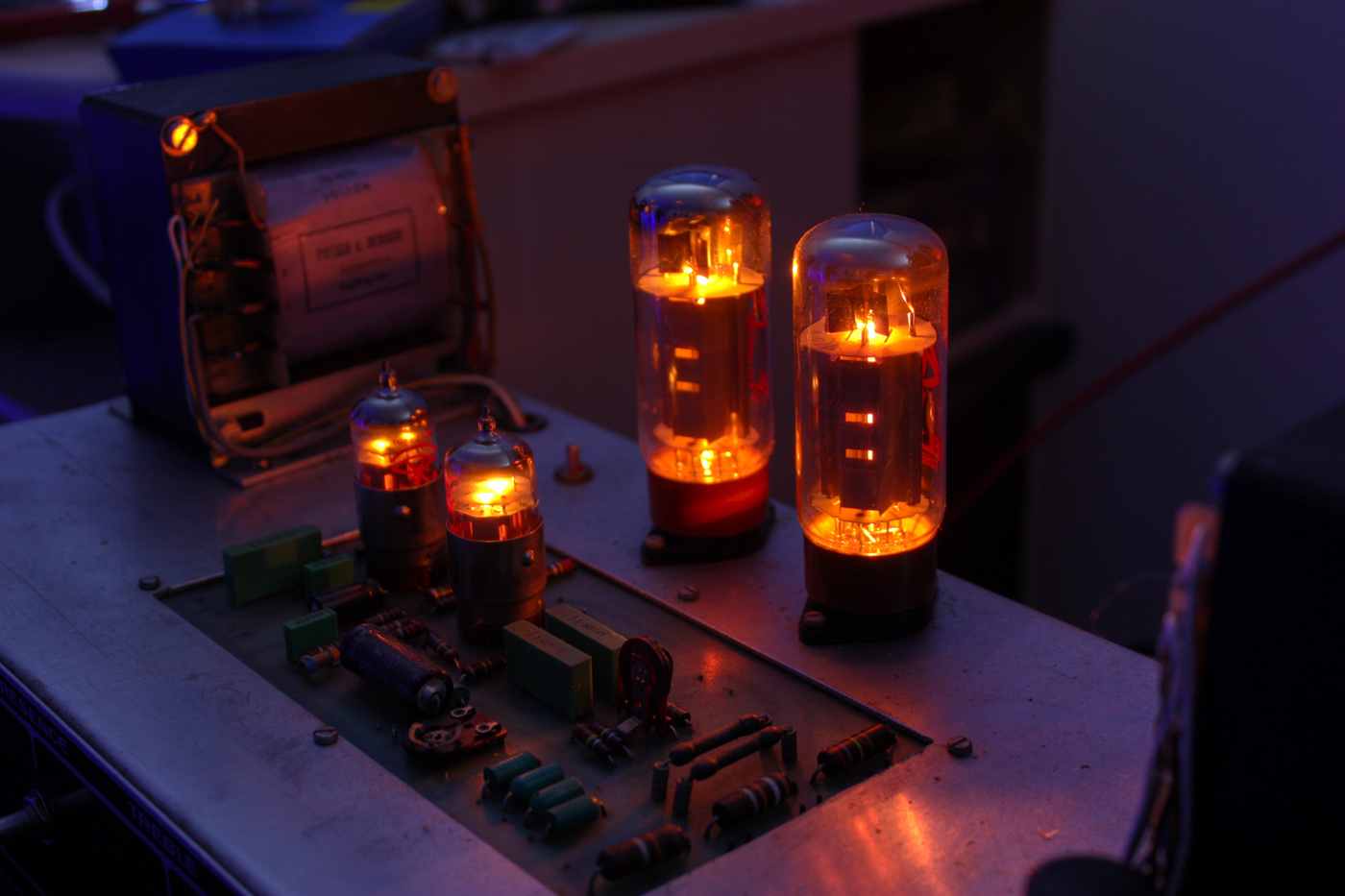
Operating tubes in an audio power amplifier, the hot cathodes emitting their distinctive red-orange glow

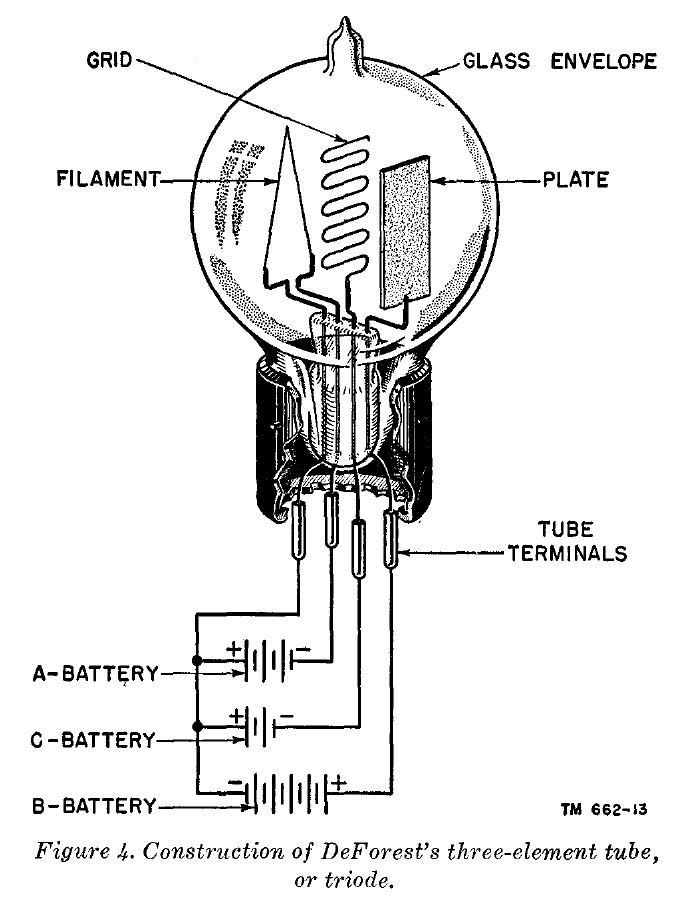
Illustration representing a primitive triode vacuum tube and the polarities of the typical DC operating potentials. Not shown are the impedances (resistors or inductors) that would be included in series with the C and B voltage sources.

The first, and simplest, vacuum tube, the diode or Fleming valve, was invented in 1904 by John Ambrose Fleming. It contains only a heated electron-emitting cathode and an anode. Conventional current can flow in only one direction through the device: from the cathode to the anode (hence the name "valve", like a device permitting one-way flow of water). Adding one or more control grids within the tube, creating the triode, tetrode, etc., allows the current between the cathode and anode to be controlled by the voltage on the grids, creating devices able to amplify as well as rectify electric signals. Multiple grids (e.g., a heptode) allow signals applied to different electrodes to be mixed.

These devices became a key component of electronic circuits for the first half of the twentieth century. They were crucial to the development of radio, television, radar, sound recording and reproduction, long-distance telephone networks, and analog and early digital computers. Although some applications had used earlier technologies such as the spark gap transmitter and crystal detector for radio or mechanical and electromechanical computers, the invention of the thermionic vacuum tube made these technologies widespread and practical, and created the discipline of electronics.

In the 1940s, the invention of semiconductor devices made it possible to produce solid-state electronic devices, which are smaller, safer, cooler, and more efficient, reliable, durable, and economical than thermionic tubes. Beginning in the mid-1960s, thermionic tubes were being replaced by the transistor and solid-state semiconductor technology. However, the cathode-ray tube (CRT), functionally an electron tube/valve though not usually so named, remained in use for electronic visual displays in television receivers, computer monitors, and oscilloscopes until the early 21st century.

Thermionic tubes are still employed in some applications, such as the magnetron used in microwave ovens, and some high-frequency amplifiers. Many audio enthusiasts prefer otherwise obsolete tube/valve amplifiers for the claimed "warmer" tube sound, including electric guitar players, with guitar amplifiers still relying heavily on tube/valve technology.

Not all electronic circuit valves or electron tubes are vacuum tubes. Gas-filled tubes are similar devices, but containing a gas, typically at low pressure, which exploit phenomena related to electric discharge in gases, usually without a heater.

== Classifications ==
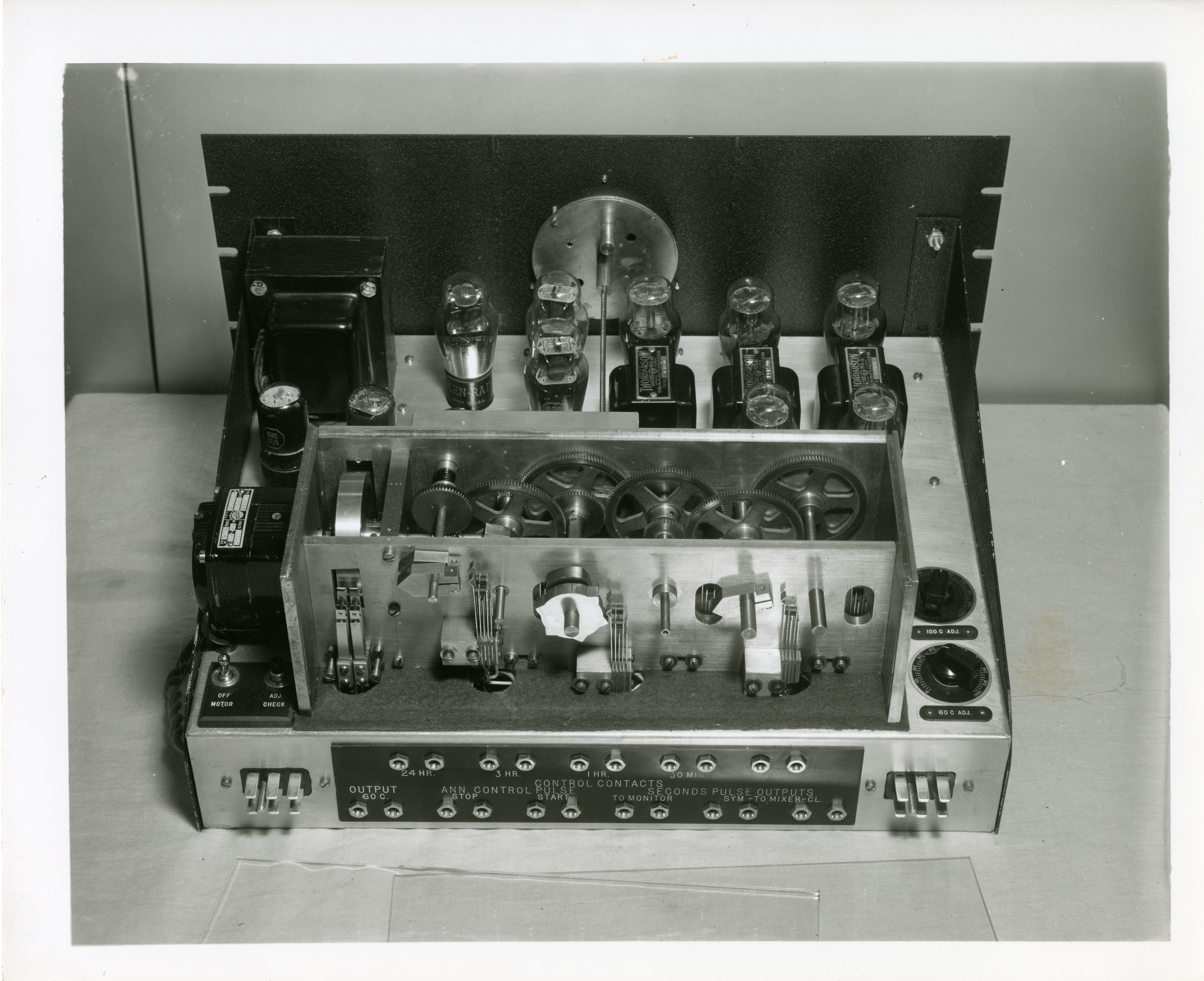
US WWV radio station signal generator using vacuum tubes, 1943

One classification of thermionic vacuum tubes is by the number of active electrodes. A device with two active elements is a diode, usually used for rectification. Devices with three elements are triodes used for amplification and switching. Additional electrodes create tetrodes, pentodes, and so forth, which have multiple additional functions made possible by the additional controllable electrodes.

Other classifications are:

- by frequency range (audio, radio, VHF, UHF, microwave)
- by power rating (small-signal, audio power, high-power radio transmitting)
- by cathode/filament type (indirectly heated, directly heated) and warm-up time (including "bright-emitter" pure tungsten filament or "dull-emitter" thoriated tungsten filament)
- by characteristic curves design (e.g., sharp- versus remote-cutoff in some pentodes)
- by application (receiving, transmitting, amplifying or switching, rectification, mixing)
- specialized parameters (long life, very low microphonic sensitivity and low-noise audio amplification, rugged or military versions)
- specialized functions (light or radiation detectors, video imaging tubes)
- tubes used to display information ("magic eye" tubes, vacuum fluorescent displays, CRTs)

Vacuum tubes may have other components and functions than those described above, and are described elsewhere. These include cathode-ray tubes, which create a beam of electrons for display purposes (such as the television picture tube, in electron microscopy, and in electron beam lithography); X-ray tubes; phototubes and photomultipliers (which rely on electron flow through a vacuum where electron emission from the cathode depends on energy from photons rather than thermionic emission).

== Description ==
Diode: electrons from the hot cathode flow towards the positive anode, but not vice versa

Triode: voltage applied to the grid controls plate (anode) current

A vacuum tube consists of two or more electrodes in a vacuum inside an airtight envelope, with pins accessible from outside the envelope to make electrical connections to the electrodes. Most tubes have glass envelopes with a glass-to-metal seal based on kovar sealable borosilicate glasses, although ceramic and metal envelopes (atop insulating bases) have been used. The electrodes are attached to leads which pass through the envelope via an airtight seal.

Most vacuum tubes have a limited lifetime, due mainly to the filament burning out or the cathode coating becoming depleted, gradually reducing performance, with other failure modes, so they are made as replaceable units; the electrode leads connect to pins on the tube's base which plug into a tube socket making tubes, a frequent cause of failure in electronic equipment, easy to remove and replace.

In addition to the base terminals, some tubes had an electrode terminating at a connection at the top of the tube, a top cap. This avoids leakage resistance, particularly for the high impedance grid input, through the tube base (sometimes made with phenolic insulation which performs poorly as an insulator in humid conditions) and improves stability and high-frequency performance by reducing capacitance between the grid and other electrodes. Some tubes requiring a very high anode voltage used a top cap for the anode connection, helping to isolate it from the lower potential of other electrodes. In tubes with a base accommodating a limited number of electrodes, a top cap provided an extra connection. A few tubes had two top cap connections.

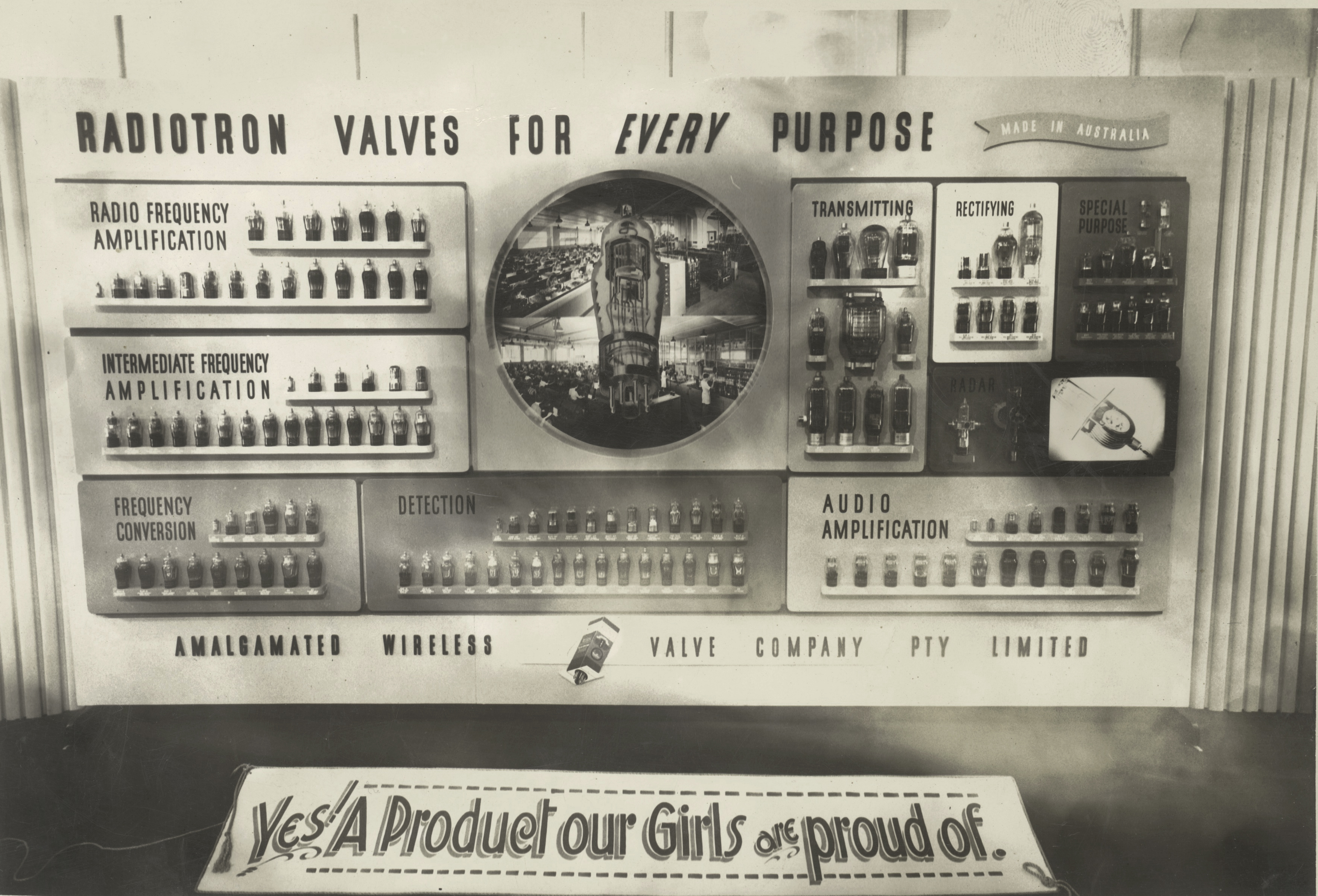
Australian Wireless Association (AWA) valve display, 1930

The earliest vacuum tubes evolved from incandescent light bulbs, containing a filament sealed in an evacuated glass envelope. When hot, the filament releases electrons into the vacuum, a process called thermionic emission. An added second electrode at a positive voltage relative to the filament, the anode or plate, will attract those electrons. The result is a net unidirectional flow of electrons from the filament to plate; there is no flow in the reverse direction because the plate does not emit positive ions. The filament has a dual function: it emits electrons when heated; and, together with the plate, it creates an electric field due to the potential difference between them. A tube with only two electrodes is termed a diode, and is used for rectification. Since current can only pass in one direction, such a diode (or rectifier) will convert alternating current (AC) to pulsating DC. This allow diodes to be used to convert AC to DC in a power supply, as a demodulator of amplitude modulated (AM) radio signals, and for similar functions.

Early tubes used the filament as the negative electrode, the cathode; this is called a "directly heated" tube. Most later tubes are "indirectly heated" by a filament or heater element inside a metal tube functioning as the cathode, with an oxide coating that much improves electron emission. The heater is electrically isolated from the surrounding cathode and simply serves to heat the cathode sufficiently for thermionic emission of electrons. H. J. Round invented the indirectly heated tube around 1913. The electrical isolation allows all the tubes' heaters to be supplied from a common circuit (which can be AC, although the cathodes must be at a steady potential) separate from operating voltages; in particular the cathodes in different tubes can operate at different voltages. The filaments require constant and often considerable power, even when amplifying signals at the microwatt level.

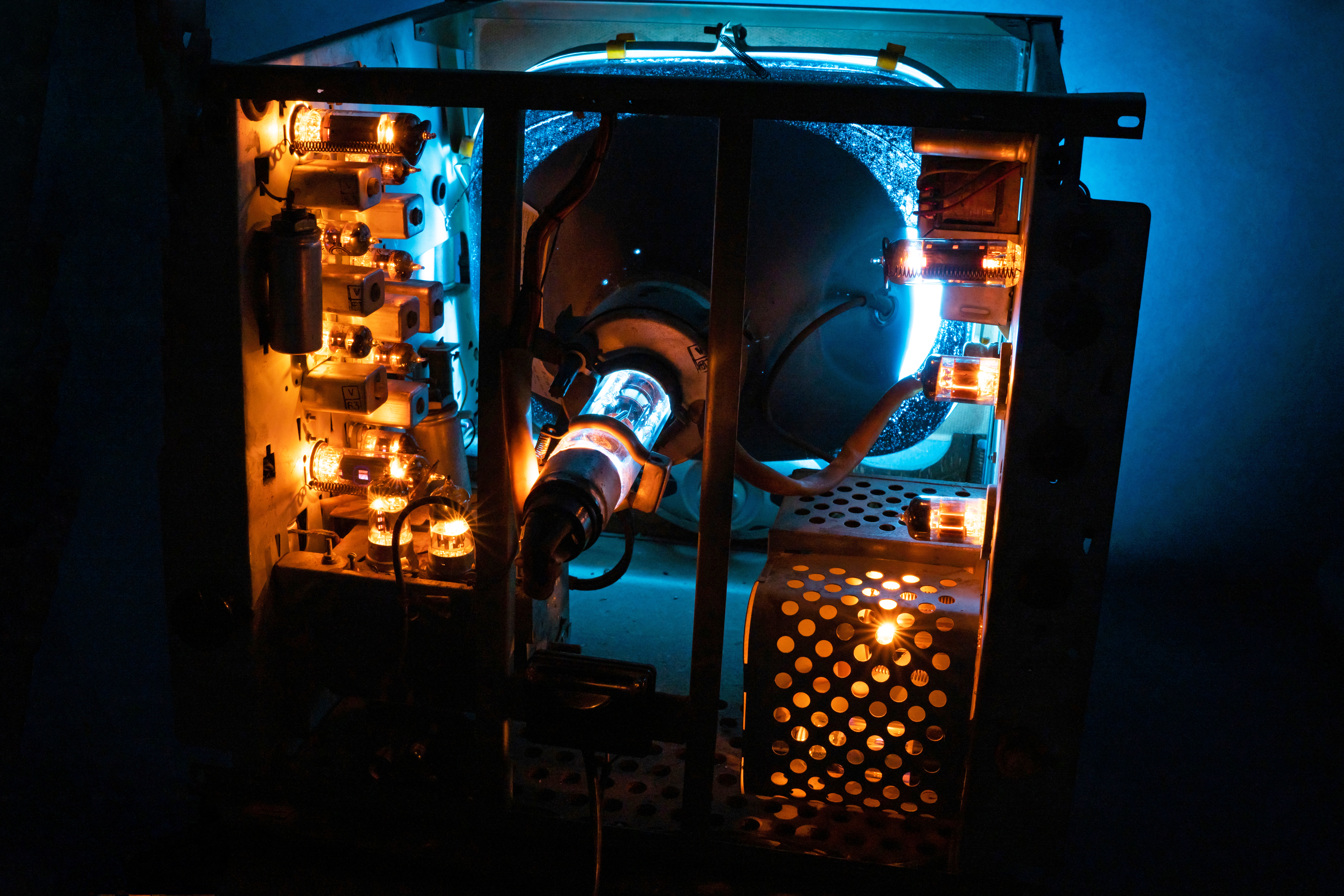
A Soviet-made television set viewed from the rear while powered on. The vacuum tubes are hot enough to pass the Draper point and glow in the visible spectrum.

Power is dissipated by the filaments, and by electrons from the cathode impacting and heating the anode (plate); this occurs even in an idle amplifier due to the quiescent current necessary to ensure linearity and low distortion. In a power amplifier, this heating can be considerable and can destroy the tube if driven beyond its safe limits. Since the tube is evacuated, convective electrode cooling is not possible; the anodes in most small and medium power tubes are cooled by radiation through the glass envelope. In some very high power applications, cooling is drastically improved by making the anode part of the (metal) tube envelope, in thermal contact with a heat sink cooled by forced air or water (the anode would normally be at ground potential, with the cathode and grids at a high negative potential). Klystrons and magnetrons are tubes that often operate their anodes (called collectors in klystrons) at ground potential to facilitate cooling, particularly with water, without high-voltage insulation.

Except for diodes, additional electrodes are positioned between the cathode and the plate (anode). These electrodes are not solid sheets but sparse elements through which electrons can pass, referred to as grids, influencing but not obstructing the flow of electrons to the anode. The vacuum tube is then known as a triode, tetrode, pentode, etc., depending on the number of grids. A triode has three electrodes: the anode, cathode, and one grid, and so on. The first grid, known as the control grid, (and sometimes other grids) transforms the diode into a voltage-controlled device: the voltage applied to the control grid affects the current between the cathode and the plate. When held negative with respect to the cathode, the control grid creates an electric field that repels electrons emitted by the cathode, thus reducing or even stopping the current between cathode and anode. As long as the control grid is negative relative to the cathode, essentially no current flows into it, yet a change of several volts on the control grid is sufficient to make a large difference in the plate current, possibly changing the output by hundreds of volts (depending on the circuit). The solid-state device which operates most like the pentode tube, although usually using much lower voltages, is the junction field-effect transistor (JFET).

=== Vacuum tube characteristics ===
Vacuum tubes are commonly described using characteristic curves published in tube manuals and engineering texts. These curves show relations between electrode voltages and currents, such as plate current versus plate voltage for different control-grid voltages. From these curves designers determine operating points, voltage gain, load-line behavior, and power output.

== History and development ==
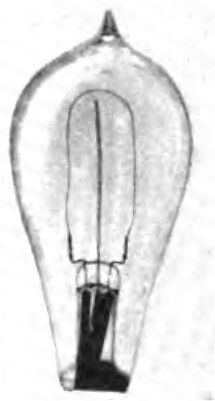
One of Edison's experimental bulbs

The 19th century saw increasing research with evacuated tubes, such as the Geissler and Crookes tubes. The many scientists and inventors who experimented with such tubes include Thomas Edison, Eugen Goldstein, Nikola Tesla, and Johann Wilhelm Hittorf. With the exception of early light bulbs, such tubes were only used in scientific research or as novelties. The groundwork laid by these scientists and inventors, however, was critical to the development of subsequent vacuum tube technology.

Although thermionic emission was originally reported in 1873 by Frederick Guthrie, it was Thomas Edison's apparently independent discovery of the phenomenon in 1883, referred to as the Edison effect, that became well known. Although Edison was aware of the unidirectional property of current flow between the filament and the anode, his interest (and patent) concentrated on the sensitivity of the anode current to the current through the filament (and thus filament temperature). It was years later that John Ambrose Fleming applied the rectifying property of the Edison effect to detection of radio signals, as an improvement over the magnetic detector.

Amplification by vacuum tube became practical only with Lee de Forest's 1907 invention of the three-terminal "audion" tube, a crude form of what was to become the triode. Being essentially the first electronic amplifier, such tubes were instrumental in long-distance telephony (such as the first coast-to-coast telephone line in the US) and public address systems, and introduced a far superior and versatile technology for use in radio transmitters and receivers.

=== Diodes ===
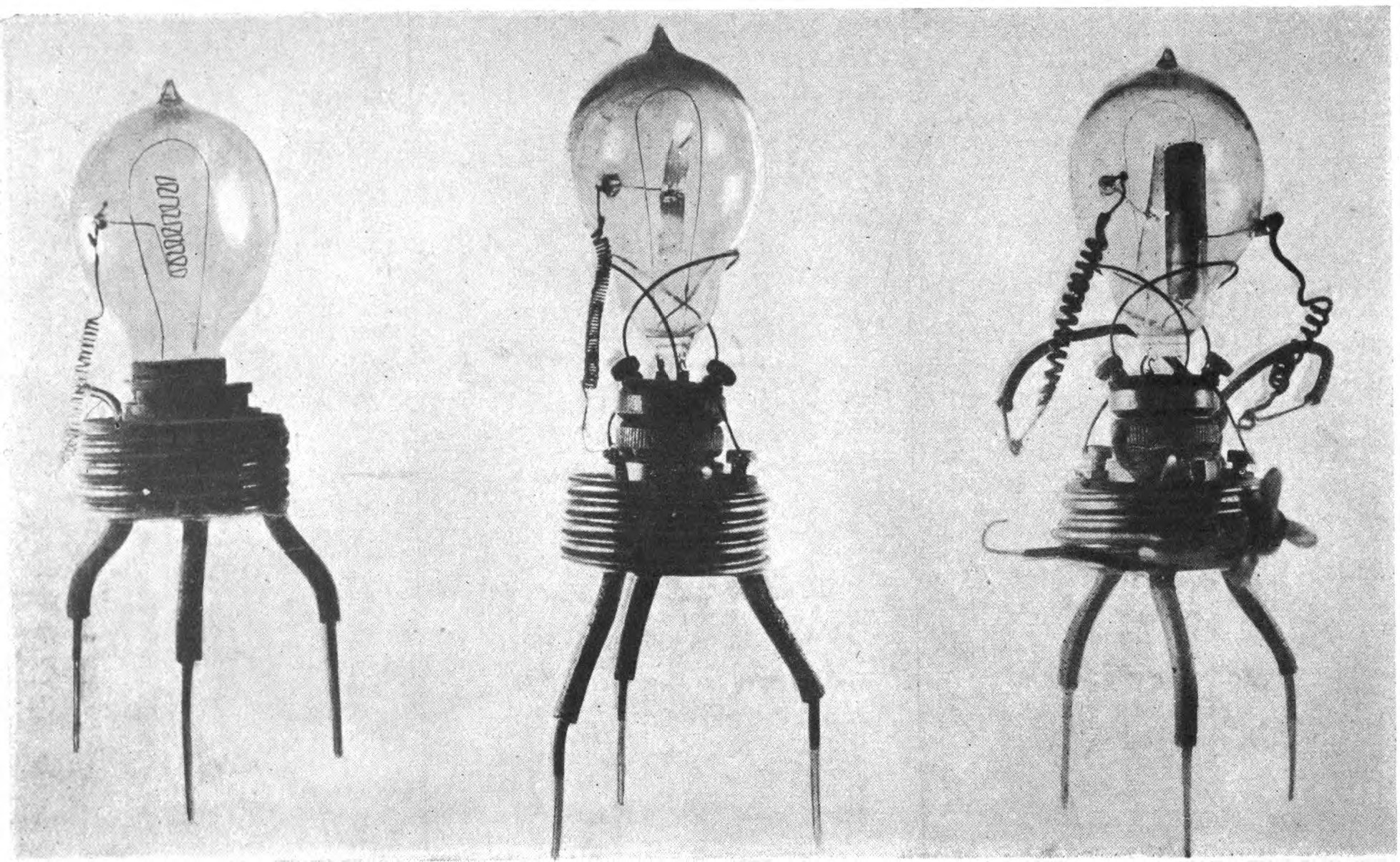
Fleming's first diodes

At the end of the 19th century, radio or wireless technology was in an early stage of development and the Marconi Company was engaged in development and construction of radio communication systems. Guglielmo Marconi appointed English physicist John Ambrose Fleming as scientific advisor in 1899. Fleming had been engaged as scientific advisor to Edison Telephone (1879), as scientific advisor at Edison Electric Light (1882), and was also technical consultant to Edison-Swan. One of Marconi's needs was for improvement of the detector, a device that extracts information from a modulated radio frequency. Marconi had developed a magnetic detector, which was less responsive to natural sources of radio frequency interference than the coherer, but the magnetic detector only provided an audio frequency signal to a telephone receiver. A reliable detector that could drive a printing instrument was needed.

As a result of experiments conducted on Edison effect bulbs, Fleming developed a vacuum tube that he termed the oscillation valve because it passed current in only one direction. The cathode was a carbon lamp filament, heated by passing current through it, that produced thermionic emission of electrons. Electrons that had been emitted from the cathode were attracted to the plate (anode) when the plate was at a positive voltage with respect to the cathode. Fleming patented these tubes for the Marconi company in the UK, filing in November 1904, with patent issued in September 1905. Later known as the Fleming valve, the "oscillation valve" was developed for the purpose of rectifying radio-frequency current as the detector component of radio receiver circuits.

While not more sensitive than a properly working crystal detector, the Fleming valve did not need the fiddly adjustment the whisker of a crystal detector required, and was not susceptible to becoming bumped out of the optimum position by vibration or movement, which was particularly advantageous for use on a moving ship.

=== Triodes ===
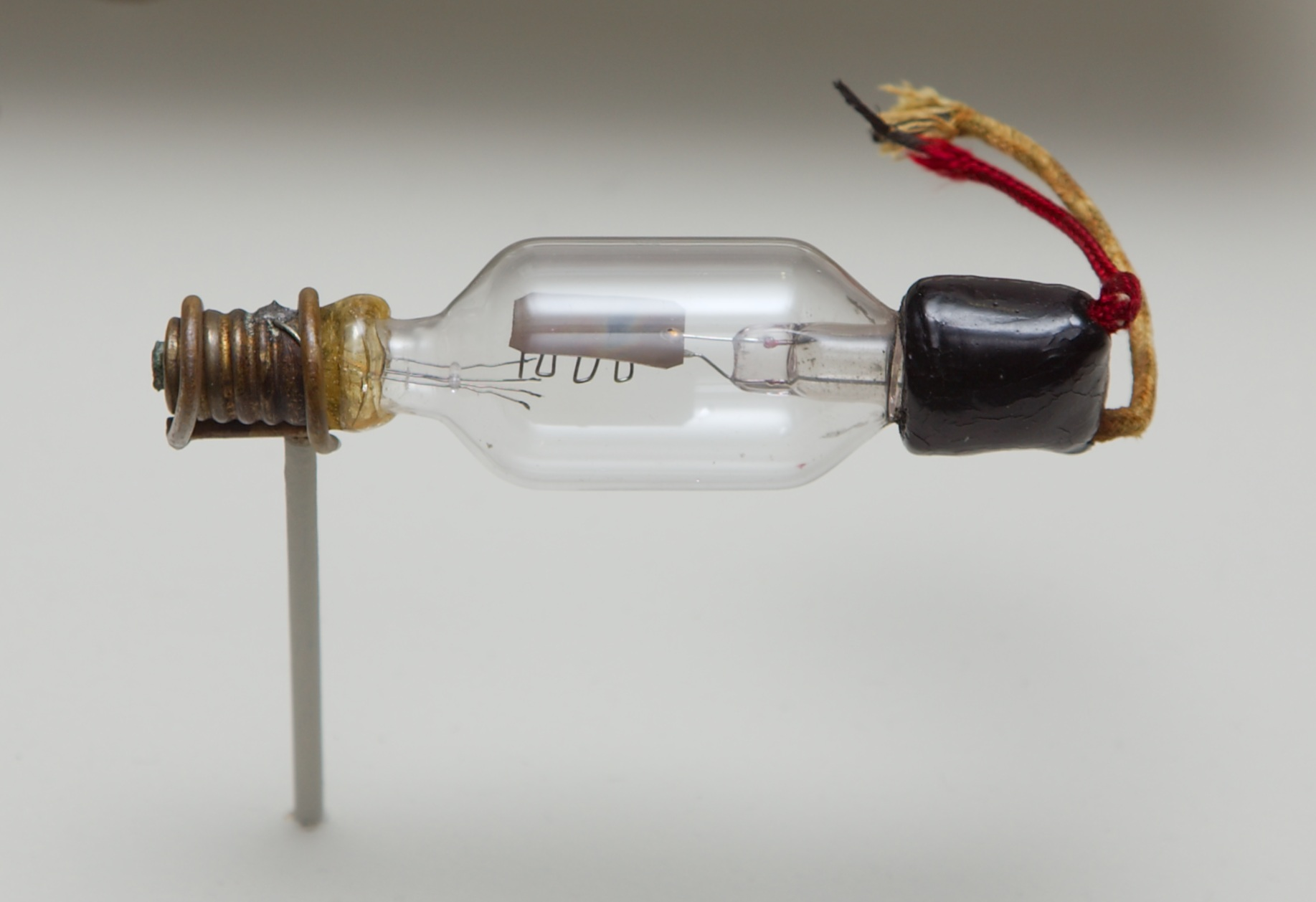
The first triode, the de Forest Audion, invented in 1906

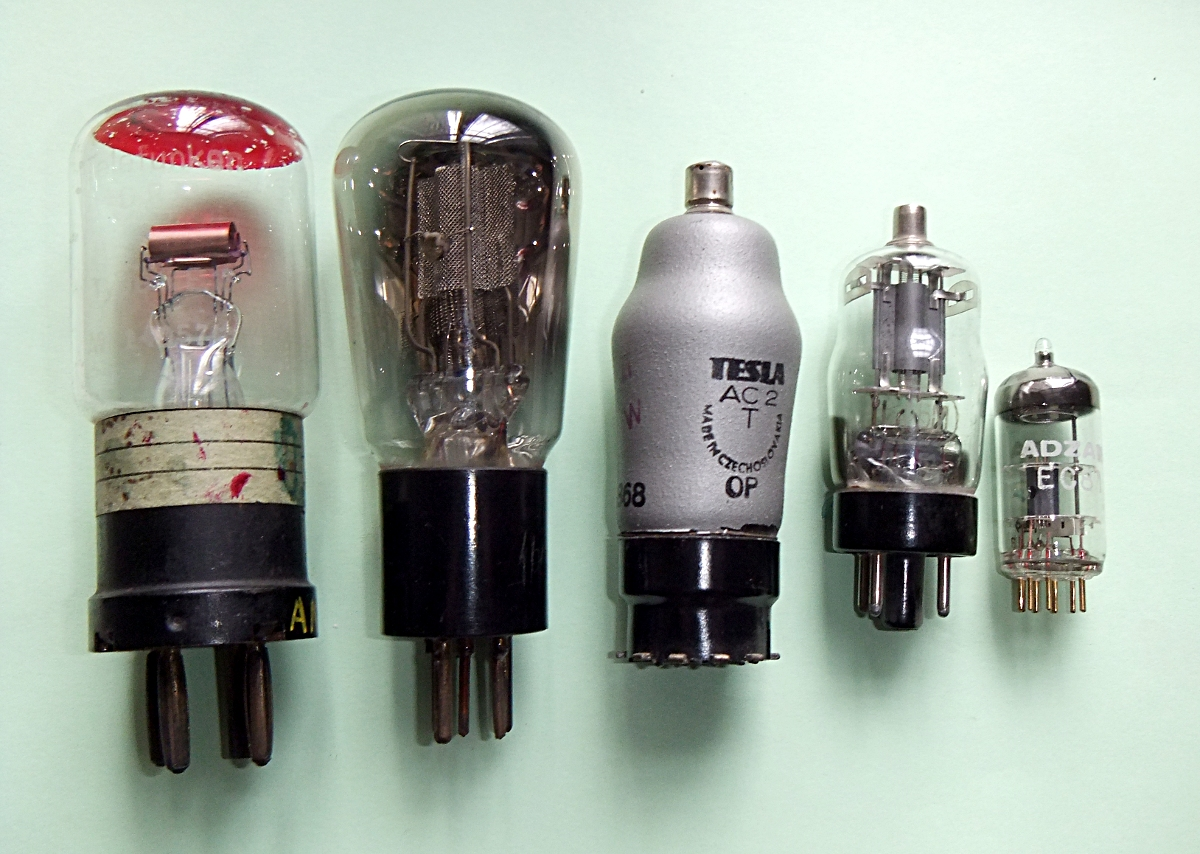
Triodes as they evolved over some 45 years of tube manufacture, from the RE16 in 1918 to a 1960s era miniature tube

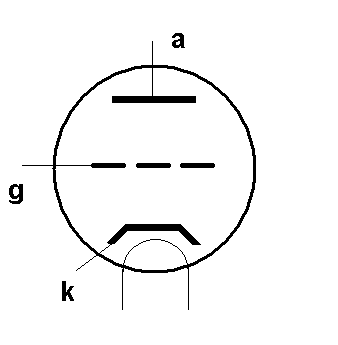
Triode symbol. From top to bottom: plate (anode), control grid, cathode, heater (filament)

In the 19th century, telegraph and telephone engineers had recognized the need to extend the distance that signals could be transmitted. In 1906, Robert von Lieben filed for a patent for a cathode-ray tube which used an external magnetic deflection coil and was intended for use as an amplifier in telephony equipment. This von Lieben magnetic deflection tube was not a successful amplifier, however, because of the power used by the deflection coil. Von Lieben would later make refinements to triode vacuum tubes.

Lee de Forest is credited with inventing the triode tube in 1907 while experimenting to improve his original (diode) Audion. By placing an additional electrode between the filament (cathode) and plate (anode), he discovered the ability of the resulting device to amplify signals. As the voltage applied to the control grid (or simply "grid") was lowered below the cathode voltage, the current flowing from the filament to the plate decreased. The negative electrostatic field created by the grid in the vicinity of the cathode inhibited the passage of emitted electrons and reduced the current to the plate. With the grid negative relative to the cathode, no direct current could pass from the cathode to the grid. Consequently, a change of voltage applied to the grid, requiring no power input as no current flowed, could make a change in the plate current and could lead to a much larger voltage change at the plate; the result was voltage and power amplification. In 1908, de Forest was granted a patent (U.S. patent 879,532) for such a three-electrode version of his original Audion for use as an electronic amplifier in radio communications. This eventually became known as the triode.

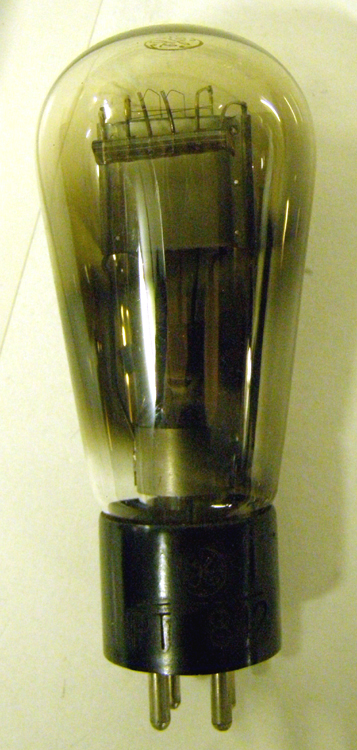
General Electric Company Pliotron, at the Science History Institute

De Forest's original device was made with conventional vacuum technology. The vacuum was not a "hard vacuum" but rather left a very small amount of residual gas. The physics behind the device's operation was not fully understood. The residual gas would cause a blue glow due to visible ionization when the plate voltage exceeded about 60 volts. In 1912, de Forest and John Stone Stone brought the Audion for demonstration to AT&T's engineering department, where Harold D. Arnold realized that the blue glow was caused by ionized gas. He recommended that AT&T purchase the patent. Arnold developed high-vacuum tubes which operated at high plate voltages without a blue glow; they were tested in the summer of 1913 on AT&T's long-distance network.

Finnish inventor Eric Tigerstedt significantly improved on the original triode design in 1914, while working on his sound-on-film process in Berlin, Germany. Tigerstedt's innovation was to make the electrodes concentric cylinders with the cathode at the centre, thus greatly increasing the collection of emitted electrons at the anode.

Irving Langmuir at the General Electric research laboratory (Schenectady, New York) had improved Wolfgang Gaede's high-vacuum diffusion pump and used it to settle the question of thermionic emission and conduction in a vacuum. Consequently, General Electric started producing hard vacuum triodes (which were branded Pliotrons) in 1915. Langmuir patented the hard vacuum triode, but de Forest and AT&T successfully asserted priority and invalidated the patent.

Pliotrons were closely followed by the French type 'TM' and later the British type 'R', which were in widespread use by the allied military by 1916. Historically, vacuum levels in production vacuum tubes typically ranged from 10 μPa down to 10 nPa (8×10^{−8} Torr down to 8×10^{−11} Torr).

The triode and its derivatives (tetrodes and pentodes) are transconductance devices, in which the controlling signal applied to the grid is a voltage, and the resulting amplified signal appearing at the anode is a current. By comparison the later bipolar junction transistor uses a small current to control a larger current.

For vacuum tubes, transconductance or mutual conductance (g_{m}) is defined as the change in the plate(anode)/cathode current divided by the corresponding change in the grid to cathode voltage, with a constant plate(anode) to cathode voltage. Typical values of g_{m} for a small-signal vacuum tube are 1 to 10 millisiemens. It is one of the three main parameters of a vacuum tube, the other two being its gain μ and plate resistance R_{p} or R_{a}; these parameters are related by the Van der Bijl equation: $g_m = {\mu \over R_p}$

The plate current of the triode was not accurately proportional to the grid voltage, i.e. the operating characteristic was non-linear, causing early tube audio amplifiers to exhibit harmonic distortion at low volumes. Plotting plate current as a function of applied grid voltage, it was seen that there was a range of grid voltages for which the transfer curve was approximately linear.

To use this range, a negative bias voltage had to be applied to the grid to position the DC operating point in the linear region. This was called the idle condition, and the plate current at this point the "idle current". The controlling voltage was superimposed onto the bias voltage, resulting in a nearly linear variation of plate current in response to positive and negative variation of the input voltage around that point.

This concept is called grid bias. Many early radio sets had a third battery called the "C battery" (unrelated to the present-day C cell, a format). The C battery's positive terminal was connected to the cathode of the tubes ("ground" in most circuits) and the negative terminal supplied bias voltage to the grids of the tubes.

Later circuits, after tubes were made with heaters isolated from their cathodes, used cathode biasing, avoiding the need for a separate negative power supply. For cathode biasing, a relatively low-value resistor is connected between the cathode and ground. Current flow through the resistor makes the cathode positive with respect to the grid, which is at ground potential for DC.

However C batteries continued to be included in some equipment even when the "A" and "B" batteries had been replaced by power from the AC mains. That was possible because there was essentially no current draw on these batteries; they could thus last for many years (often longer than all the tubes) without requiring replacement.

When triodes were first used with tuned rather than resistive loads in radio-frequency transmitters and receivers, it was found that tuned amplification stages had a tendency to oscillate unless their gain was very limited, due to the parasitic capacitance, termed Miller capacitance, between the plate (the amplifier's output) and the control grid (the amplifier's input).

Eventually the technique of neutralization was developed whereby the RF transformer connected to the plate (anode) included an additional winding in the opposite phase, connected to the grid through a small capacitor. When properly adjusted this cancelled the Miller capacitance. This technique was successfully employed in the Neutrodyne radio during the 1920s. Neutralization was dependent upon the frequency; it required careful adjustment and did not work over a wide range of frequencies.

=== Tetrodes and pentodes ===
Tetrode symbol. From top to bottom: plate (anode), screen grid, control grid, cathode, heater (filament).

To combat the stability problems of the triode as a radio frequency amplifier due to grid-to-plate capacitance, the physicist Walter H. Schottky invented the tetrode or screen grid tube in 1919. He showed that the addition of an electrostatic shield between the control grid and the plate could solve the problem. This design was refined by Hull and Williams. The added grid became known as the screen grid or shield grid. The screen grid is operated at a positive voltage significantly less than the plate voltage and it is bypassed to ground with a capacitor of low impedance at the frequencies to be amplified. This arrangement substantially decouples the plate and the control grid, eliminating the need for neutralizing circuitry at medium wave broadcast frequencies. The screen grid also largely reduces the influence of the plate voltage on the space charge near the cathode, permitting the tetrode to produce greater voltage gain than the triode in amplifier circuits. While the amplification factors of typical triodes commonly range from below ten to around 100, tetrode amplification factors of 500 are common. Consequently, higher voltage gains from a single tube amplification stage became possible, reducing the number of tubes required. Screen grid tubes were marketed by late 1927.

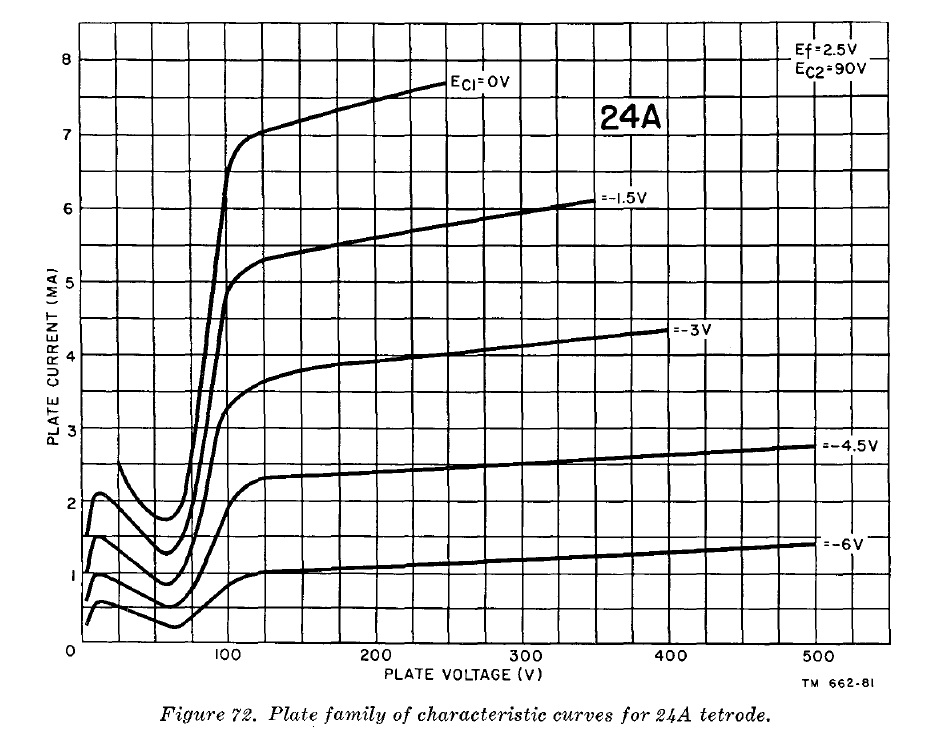
The useful region of operation of the screen grid tube (tetrode) as an amplifier is limited to anode potentials in the straight portions of the characteristic curves greater than the screen grid potential.

However, the useful region of operation of the screen grid tube as an amplifier was limited to plate voltages greater than the screen grid voltage, due to secondary emission from the plate. In any tube, electrons strike the plate with sufficient energy to cause the emission of electrons from its surface. In a triode this secondary emission of electrons is not important since they are simply re-captured by the plate. But in a tetrode they can be captured by the screen grid since it is also at a positive voltage, robbing them from the plate current and reducing the amplification of the tube. Since secondary electrons can outnumber the primary electrons over a certain range of plate voltages, the plate current can decrease with increasing plate voltage. This is the dynatron region or tetrode kink and is an example of negative resistance which can itself cause instability. Another undesirable consequence of secondary emission is that screen current is increased, which may cause the screen to exceed its power rating.

The otherwise undesirable negative resistance region of the plate characteristic was exploited with the dynatron oscillator circuit to produce a simple oscillator only requiring connection of the plate to a resonant LC circuit to oscillate. The dynatron oscillator operated on the same principle of negative resistance as the tunnel diode oscillator many years later.

The dynatron region of the screen grid tube was eliminated by adding a grid between the screen grid and the plate to create the pentode. The suppressor grid of the pentode was usually connected to the cathode and its negative voltage relative to the anode repelled secondary electrons so that they would be collected by the anode instead of the screen grid. The term pentode means the tube has five electrodes. The pentode was invented in 1926 by Bernard D. H. Tellegen and became generally favored over the simple tetrode. Pentodes are made in two classes: those with the suppressor grid wired internally to the cathode (e.g. EL84/6BQ5) and those with the suppressor grid wired to a separate pin for user access (e.g. 803, 837). An alternative solution for power applications is the beam tetrode or beam power tube, discussed below.

=== Multifunction and multisection tubes ===
The pentagrid converter contains five grids between the cathode and the plate (anode).

Superheterodyne receivers require a local oscillator and mixer, combined in the function of a single pentagrid converter tube. Various alternatives such as using a combination of a triode with a hexode and even an octode have been used for this purpose. The additional grids include control grids (at a low potential) and screen grids (at a high voltage). Many designs use such a screen grid as an additional anode to provide feedback for the oscillator function, whose current adds to that of the incoming radio frequency signal. The pentagrid converter thus became widely used in AM receivers, including the miniature tube version of the "All American Five". Octodes, such as the 7A8, were rarely used in the United States, but much more common in Europe, particularly in battery operated radios where the lower power consumption was an advantage.

To further reduce the cost and complexity of radio equipment, two separate structures (triode and pentode for instance) can be combined in the bulb of a single multisection tube. An early example is the Loewe 3NF. This 1920s device has three triodes in a single glass envelope together with all the fixed capacitors and resistors required to make a complete radio receiver. As the Loewe set had only one tube socket, it was able to substantially undercut the competition, since, in Germany, state tax was levied by the number of sockets. However, reliability was compromised, and production costs for the tube were much greater. In a sense, these were akin to integrated circuits. In the United States, Cleartron briefly produced the "Multivalve" triple triode for use in the Emerson Baby Grand receiver. This Emerson set also has a single tube socket, but because it uses a four-pin base, the additional element connections are made on a "mezzanine" platform at the top of the tube base.

By 1940 multisection tubes had become commonplace. There were constraints, however, due to patents and other licensing considerations (see British Radio Valve Manufacturers' Association). Constraints due to the number of external pins (leads) often forced the functions to share some of those external connections such as their cathode connections (in addition to the heater connection). The RCA Type 55 is a double diode triode used as a detector, automatic gain control rectifier and audio preamplifier in early AC powered radios. These sets often include the 53 Dual Triode Audio Output. Another early type of multi-section tube, the 6SN7, is a "dual triode" which performs the functions of two triode tubes while taking up half as much space and costing less. The 12AX7 is a dual "high mu" (high voltage gain) triode in a miniature enclosure, and became widely used in audio signal amplifiers, instruments, and guitar amplifiers.

The introduction of the miniature tube base (see below) which can have 9 pins, more than previously available, allowed other multi-section tubes to be introduced, such as the 6GH8/ECF82 triode-pentode, quite popular in television receivers. The desire to include even more functions in one envelope resulted in the General Electric Compactron which has 12 pins. A typical example, the 6AG11, contains two triodes and two diodes.

Some otherwise conventional tubes do not fall into standard categories; the 6AR8, 6JH8 and 6ME8 have several common grids, followed by a pair of beam deflection electrodes which deflected the current towards either of two anodes. They were sometimes known as the 'sheet beam' tubes and used in some color TV sets for color demodulation. The similar 7360 was popular as a balanced SSB (de)modulator.

=== Beam power tubes ===
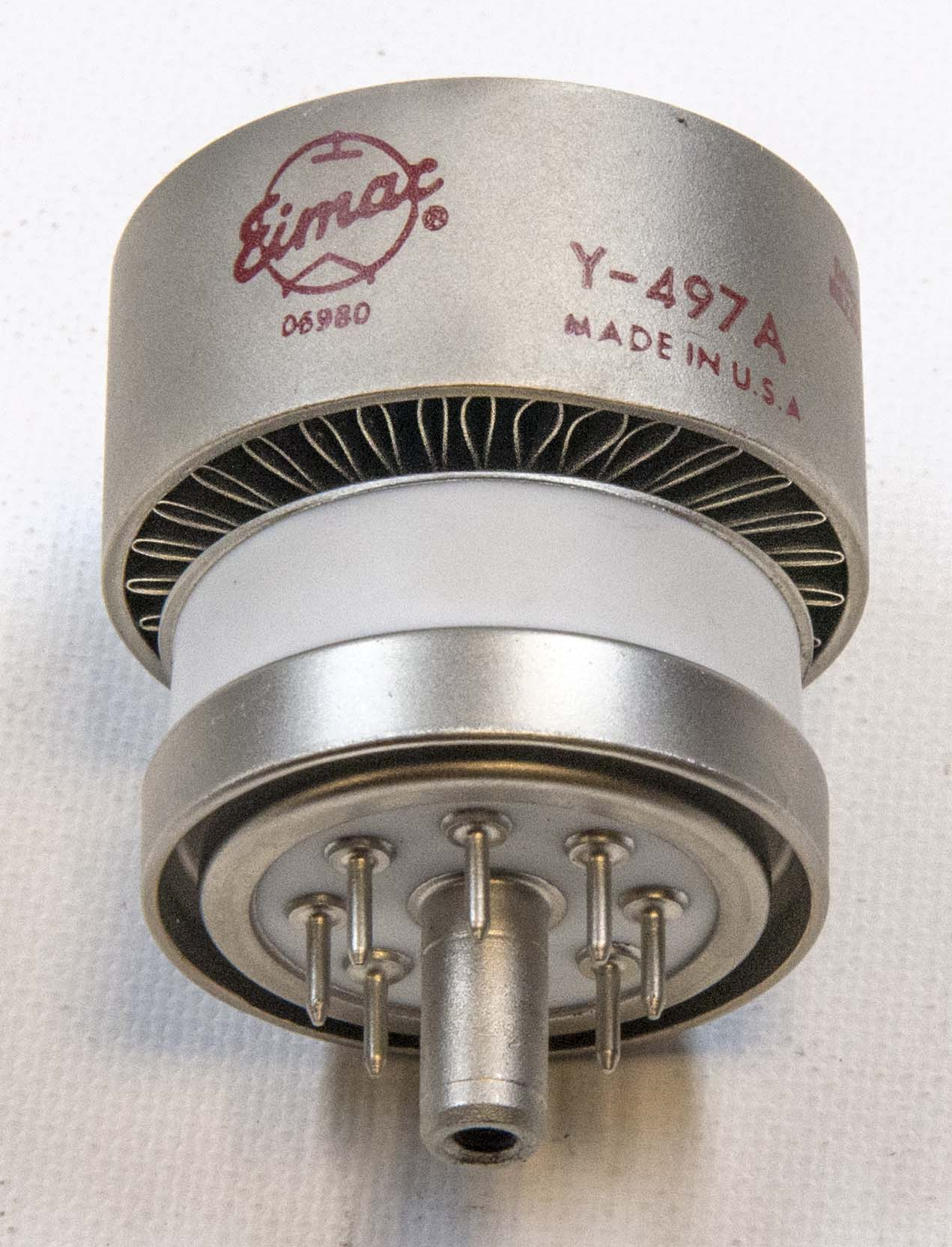
Beam tetrode designed for radio frequency use. The tube plugs in to a socket that creates an air-tight seal around the outer periphery. A blower and duct work in the chassis force air through the tube's fins to carry away heat. This type of tube is sometimes referred to as a "doorknob" tube, owing to its shape and size.

A beam tetrode (or "beam power tube") forms the electron stream from the cathode into multiple partially collimated beams to produce a low potential space charge region between the anode and screen grid to return anode secondary emission electrons to the anode when the anode potential is less than that of the screen grid. Formation of beams also reduces screen grid current. In some cylindrically symmetrical beam power tubes, the cathode is formed of narrow strips of emitting material that are aligned with the apertures of the control grid, reducing control grid current. This design helps to overcome some of the practical barriers to designing high-power, high-efficiency power tubes.

Manufacturer's data sheets often use the terms beam pentode or beam power pentode instead of beam power tube, and use a pentode graphic symbol instead of a graphic symbol showing beam forming plates.

Beam power tubes offer the advantages of a longer load line, less screen current, higher transconductance and lower third harmonic distortion than comparable power pentodes. Beam power tubes can be connected as triodes for improved audio tonal quality but in triode mode deliver significantly reduced power output.

=== Gas-filled tubes ===
Gas-filled tubes such as discharge tubes and cold cathode tubes are not hard vacuum tubes, though are always filled with gas at less than sea-level atmospheric pressure. Types such as the voltage-regulator tube and thyratron resemble hard vacuum tubes and fit in sockets designed for vacuum tubes. Their distinctive orange, red, or purple glow during operation indicates the presence of gas; electrons flowing in a vacuum do not produce light within that region. These types may still be referred to as "electron tubes" as they do perform electronic functions. High-power rectifiers use mercury vapor to achieve a lower forward voltage drop than high-vacuum tubes.

=== Miniature tubes ===
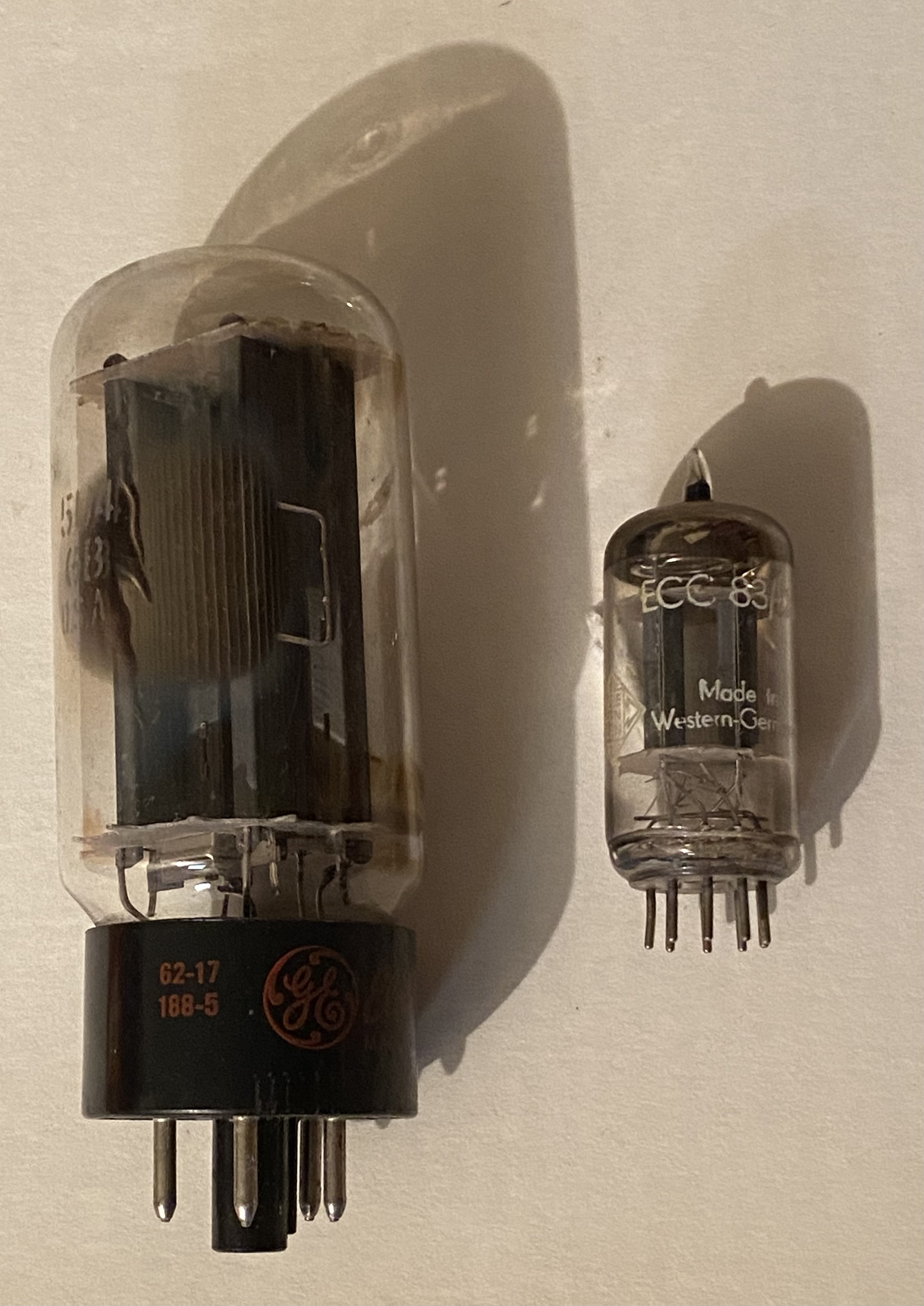
Miniature tube (right) compared to the older octal style. Not including pins, the larger tube, a 5U4GB, is 93 mm high with a 35 mm-diameter base, while the smaller, a 9-pin 12AX7, is 45 mm high and 20.4 mm in diameter.

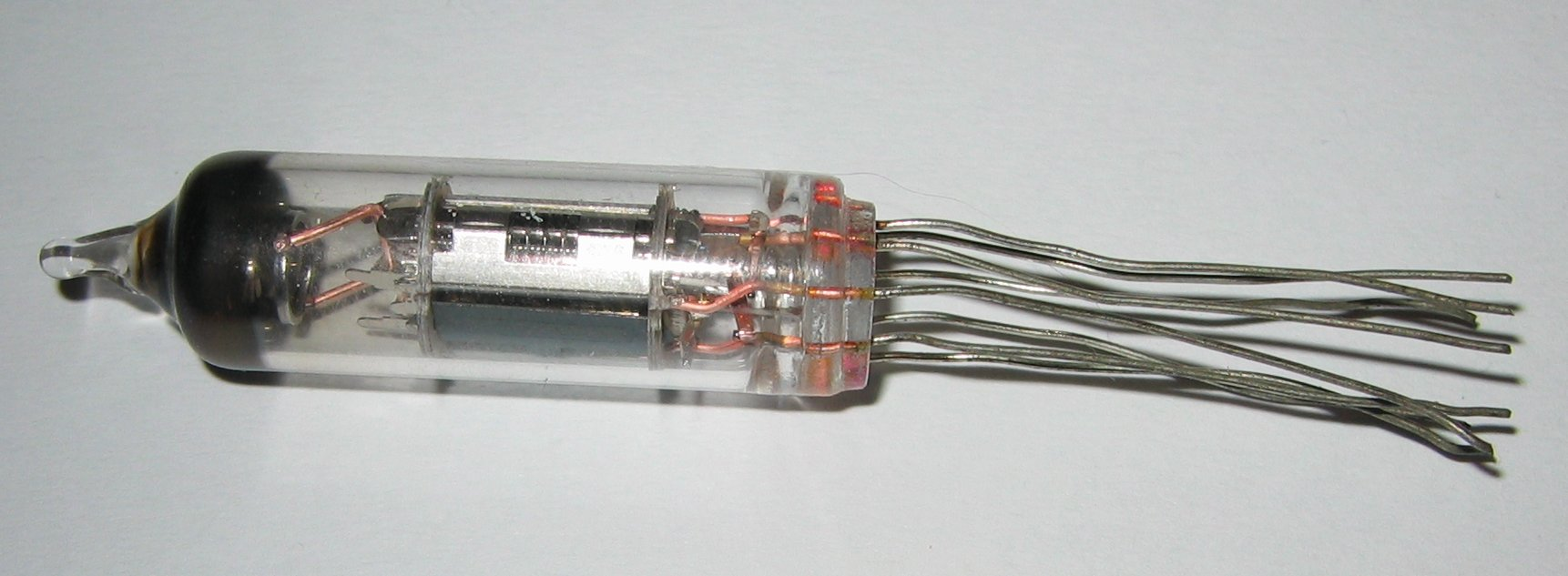
Subminiature CV4501 tube (SQ version of EF72), 35 mm long × 10 mm diameter (excluding leads)

Early tubes used a metal or glass envelope atop an insulating bakelite base. In 1938 a technique was developed to use an all-glass construction with the pins fused in the glass base of the envelope. This allowed the design of a much smaller tube (typically about 20mm in diameter), known as the miniature tube; tubes with standard seven and nine-pin (noval) bases were made. Tubes with different bases of about the same size were also introduced. Making tubes smaller reduced the voltage where they could safely operate, and also reduced the filament power required. Miniature tubes became predominant in consumer applications such as radio receivers and hi-fi amplifiers. However, the larger styles continued to be required for tubes dissipating more power, such as higher-power rectifiers, in higher-power audio output stages and as RF power transmitting tubes.

==== Sub-miniature tubes ====
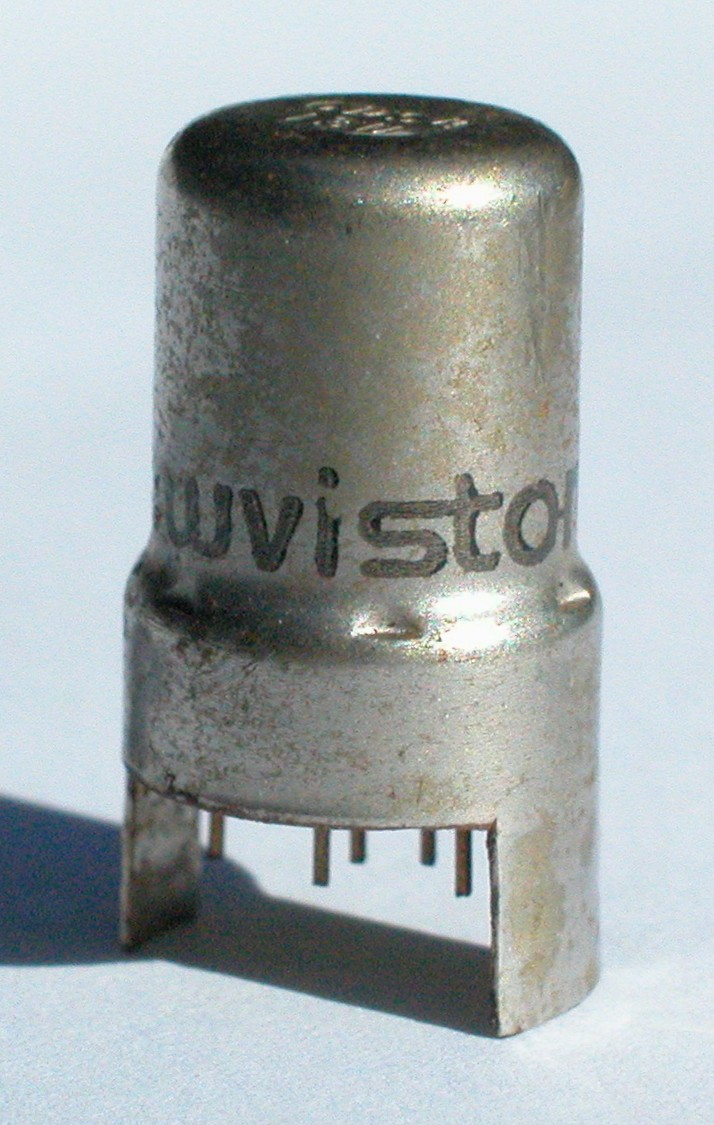
RCA 6DS4 "nuvistor" triode, c. 20 mm high by 11 mm diameter

Tubes requiring little power, such as hearing-aid amplifiers, could be much smaller than those dissipating significant heat; sub-miniature tubes with a size roughly that of half a cigarette were used. These tubes tended to be long-lived due to their low power; they did not have pins plugging into a socket for easy replacement, but were soldered in place. For higher radio frequencies larger tubes introduced frequency-limiting stray capacitance that could be reduced by reducing the size. Small tubes for high frequencies included the "acorn tube" type (named for its shape and size), and the metal-cased RCA nuvistor type from 1959, about the size of a thimble. The nuvistor was developed to compete with transistors, and could operate at higher frequencies than early transistors, and also bigger tubes, due to the nuvistor's small size (compared to signal wavelength). Nuvistors were used in aircraft radio transceivers, UHF television tuners, and some HiFi FM radio tuners (Sansui 500A) until replaced by newer high-frequency-capable transistors.

=== Improvements in construction and performance ===
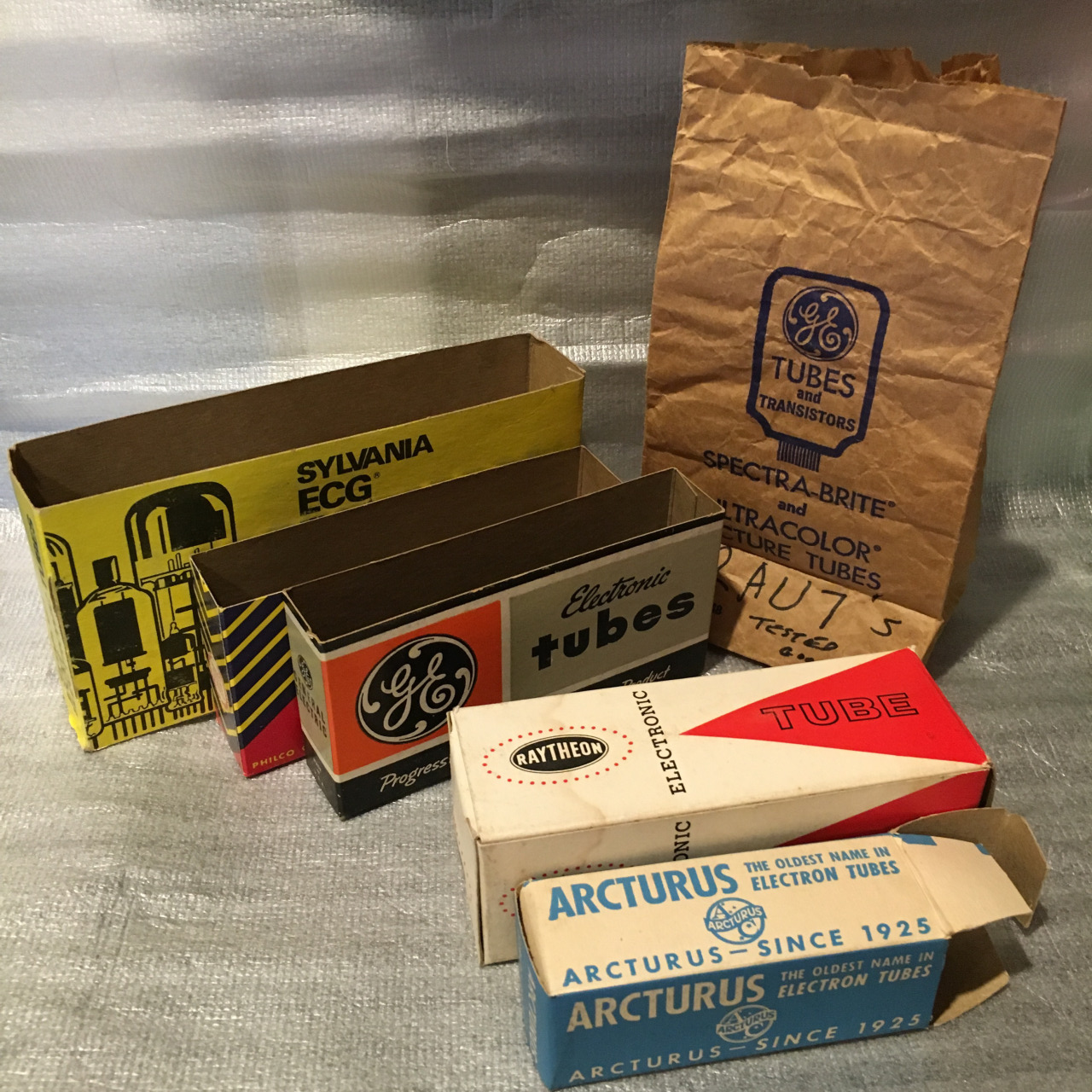
Commercial packaging for vacuum tubes used in the latter half of the 20th century including boxes for individual tubes (bottom right), sleeves for rows of the boxes (left), and bags that smaller tubes would be put in by a store upon purchase (top right)

The earliest vacuum tubes strongly resembled incandescent light bulbs and were made by lamp manufacturers, who had the equipment needed to manufacture glass envelopes and the vacuum pumps required to evacuate the enclosures. de Forest used Heinrich Geissler's mercury displacement pump, which left behind a partial vacuum. The development of the diffusion pump in 1915 and improvement by Irving Langmuir led to the development of high-vacuum tubes. After World War I, specialized manufacturers using more economical construction methods were set up to fill the growing demand for broadcast receivers. Bare tungsten filaments operated at a temperature of around 2200 °C. The development of oxide-coated filaments in the mid-1920s reduced filament operating temperature to a dull red heat (around 700 °C), which in turn reduced thermal distortion of the tube structure and allowed closer spacing of tube elements. This in turn improved tube gain, since the gain of a triode is inversely proportional to the spacing between grid and cathode. Bare tungsten filaments remain in use in small transmitting tubes but are brittle and tend to fracture if handled roughly – e.g. in the postal services. These tubes are best suited to stationary equipment where impact and vibration is not present.

=== Indirectly heated cathodes ===
The desire to power electronic equipment using AC mains power faced a difficulty with respect to the powering of the tubes' filaments, as these were also the cathode of each tube. Powering the filaments directly from a power transformer introduced mains-frequency (50 or 60 Hz) hum into audio stages. The invention of the "equipotential cathode" reduced this problem, with the filaments being powered by a balanced AC power transformer winding having a grounded center tap.

A superior solution, and one which allowed each cathode to "float" at a different voltage, was that of the indirectly heated cathode: a cylinder of oxide-coated nickel acted as an electron-emitting cathode and was electrically isolated from the filament inside it. Indirectly heated cathodes enable the cathode circuit to be separated from the heater circuit. The filament, no longer electrically connected to the tube's electrodes, became simply known as a "heater", and could as well be powered by AC without any introduction of hum. In the 1930s, indirectly heated cathode tubes became widespread in equipment using AC power. Directly heated cathode tubes continued to be widely used in battery-powered equipment as their filaments required considerably less power than the heaters required with indirectly heated cathodes.

Tubes designed for high gain audio applications may have twisted heater wires to cancel out stray electric fields, fields that could induce objectionable hum into the program material.

Heaters may be energized with either alternating current (AC) or direct current (DC). DC is often used where low hum is required.

=== Use in electronic computers ===
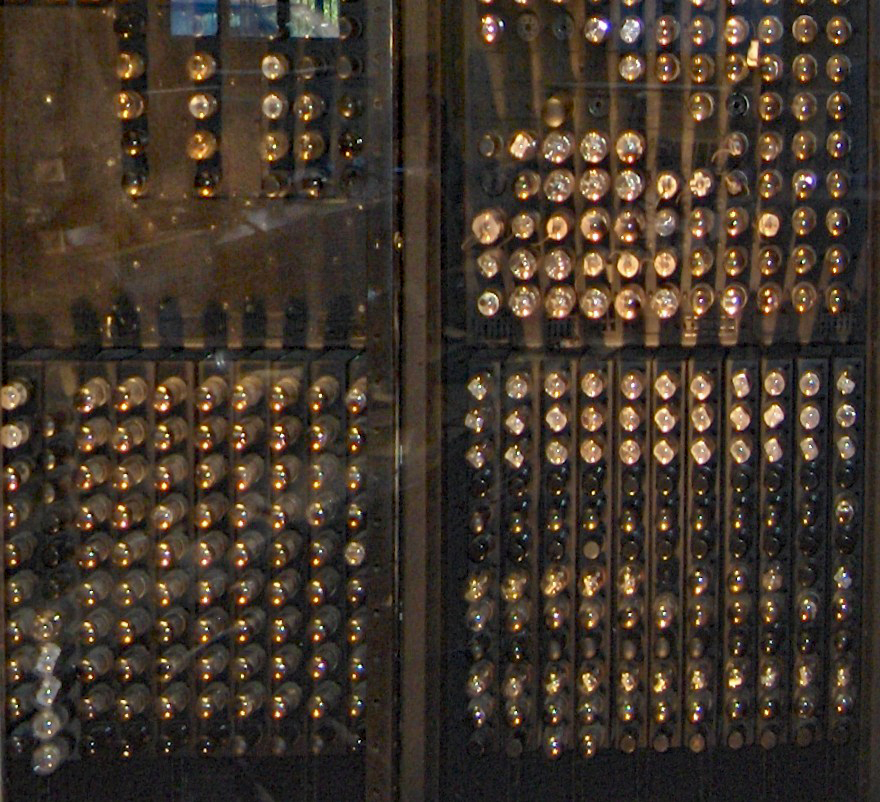
The 1946 ENIAC computer used 17,468 vacuum tubes and consumed 150 kW of power.

Vacuum tubes used as switches made electronic computing possible for the first time, but the cost and relatively short mean time to failure of tubes were limiting factors. "The common wisdom was that valves – which, like light bulbs, contained a hot glowing filament – could never be used satisfactorily in large numbers, for they were unreliable, and in a large installation too many would fail in too short a time". Tommy Flowers, who later designed Colossus, "discovered that, so long as valves were switched on and left on, they could operate reliably for very long periods, especially if their 'heaters' were run on a reduced current". In 1934 Flowers built a successful experimental installation using over 3,000 tubes in small independent modules; when a tube failed, it was possible to switch off one module and keep the others going, thereby reducing the risk of another tube failure being caused; this installation was accepted by the Post Office (who operated telephone exchanges). Flowers was also a pioneer of using tubes as very fast (compared to electromechanical devices) electronic switches. Later work confirmed that tube unreliability was not as serious an issue as generally believed; the 1946 ENIAC, with over 17,000 tubes, had a tube failure (which took 15 minutes to locate) on average every two days. The quality of the tubes was a factor, and the diversion of skilled people during the Second World War lowered the general quality of tubes. During the war Colossus was instrumental in breaking German codes. After the war, development continued with tube-based computers including, military computers ENIAC and Whirlwind, the Ferranti Mark 1 (one of the first commercially available electronic computers), and UNIVAC I, also available commercially.

Advances using subminiature tubes included the Jaincomp series of machines produced by the Jacobs Instrument Company of Bethesda, Maryland. Models such as its Jaincomp-B employed just 300 such tubes in a desktop-sized unit that offered performance to rival many of the then room-sized machines.

==== Colossus ====
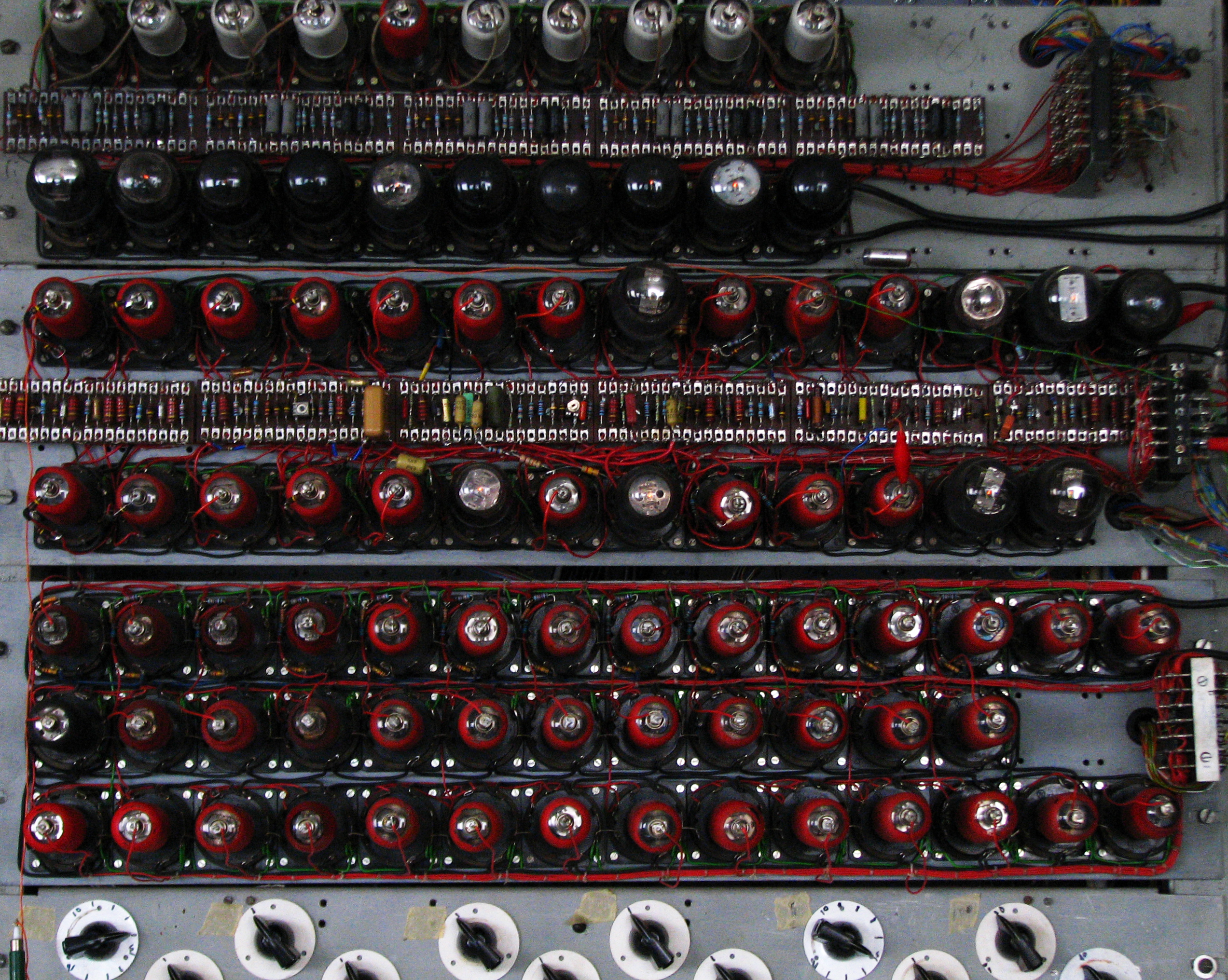
Vacuum tubes seen on end in a recreation of the World War II-era Colossus computer at Bletchley Park, England

Colossus I and its successor Colossus II (Mk2) were designed by Tommy Flowers and built by the General Post Office for Bletchley Park (BP) during World War II to substantially speed up the task of breaking the German high level Lorenz encryption. Colossus replaced an earlier machine based on relay and switch logic (the Heath Robinson). Colossus was able to break in a matter of hours messages that had previously taken several weeks; it was also much more reliable. Colossus was the first use of vacuum tubes working in concert on such a large scale for a single machine.

Tommy Flowers (who conceived Colossus) wrote that most radio equipment was "carted round, dumped around, switched on and off and generally mishandled. But I'd introduced valves into telephone equipment in large numbers before the war and I knew that if you never moved them and never switched them on and off they would go on forever". Colossus was "that reliable, extremely reliable". On its first day at BP a problem with a known answer was set. To the amazement of BP (Station X), after running for four hours with each run taking half an hour the answer was the same every time (the Robinson did not always give the same answer). Colossus I used about 1600 valves, and Colossus II about 2400 valves (some sources say 1500 (Mk I) and 2500 (Mk II); the Robinson used about a hundred valves; some sources say fewer).

==== Whirlwind and "special-quality" tubes ====
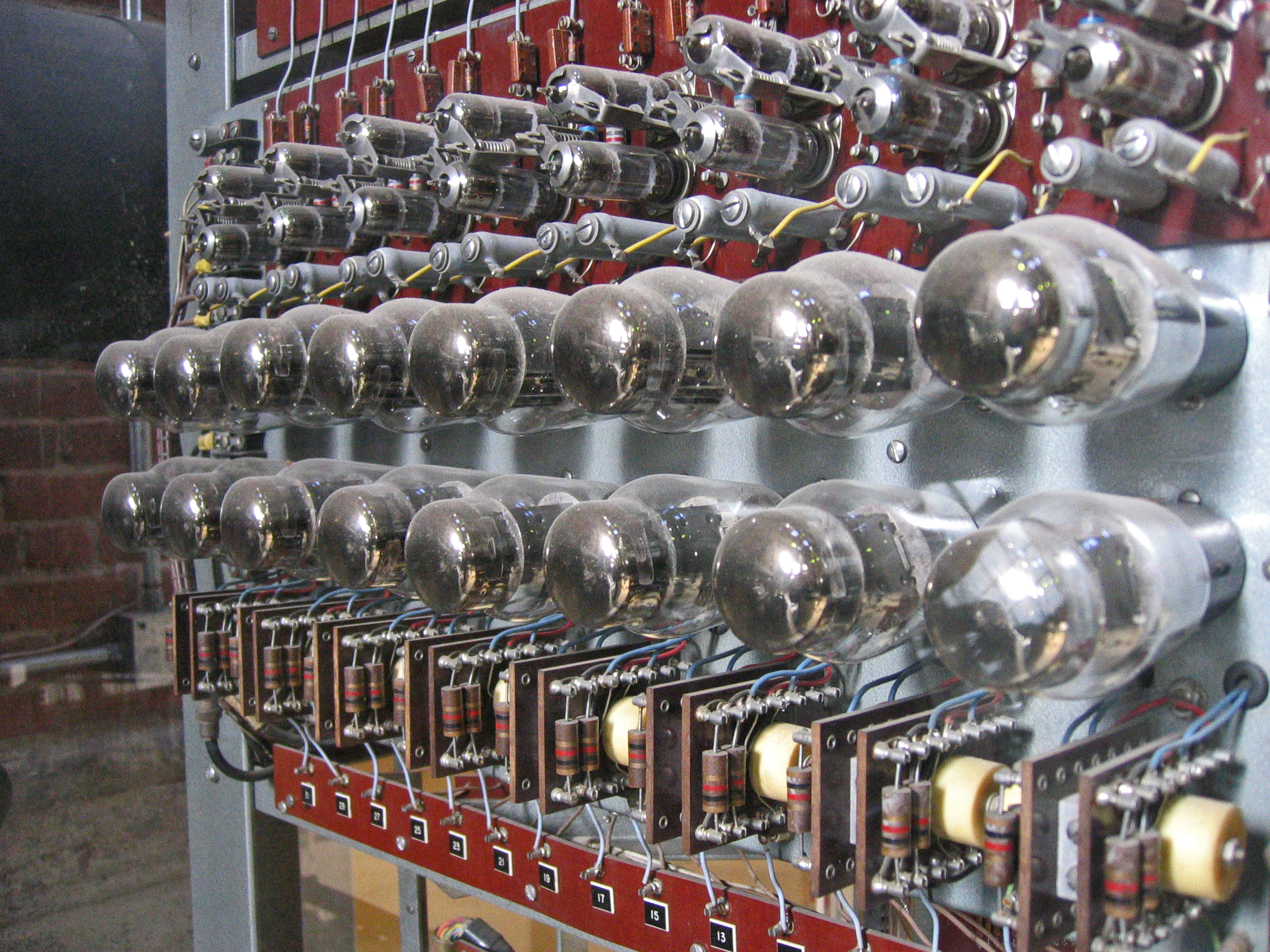
Circuitry from core memory unit of Whirlwind

To meet the reliability requirements of the 1951 US digital computer Whirlwind, "special-quality" tubes with extended life, and a long-lasting cathode in particular, were produced. The problem of short lifetime was traced largely to evaporation of silicon, used in the tungsten alloy to make the heater wire easier to draw. The silicon forms barium orthosilicate at the interface between the nickel sleeve and the cathode barium oxide coating. This "cathode interface" is a high-resistance layer (with some parallel capacitance) which greatly reduces the cathode current when the tube is switched into conduction mode. Elimination of silicon from the heater wire alloy (and more frequent replacement of the wire drawing dies) allowed the production of tubes that were reliable enough for the Whirlwind project. High-purity nickel tubing and cathode coatings free of materials such as silicates and aluminum that can reduce emissivity also contribute to long cathode life.

The first such "computer tube" was Sylvania's 7AK7 pentode of 1948 (these replaced the 7AD7, which was supposed to be better quality than the standard 6AG7 but proved too unreliable). Computers were the first tube devices to run tubes at cutoff (enough negative grid voltage to make them cease conduction) for quite-extended periods of time. Running in cutoff with the heater on accelerates cathode poisoning and the output current of the tube will be greatly reduced when switched into conduction mode. The 7AK7 tubes improved the cathode poisoning problem, but that alone was insufficient to achieve the required reliability. Further measures included switching off the heater voltage when the tubes were not required to conduct for extended periods, turning on and off the heater voltage with a slow ramp to avoid thermal shock on the heater element, and stress testing the tubes during offline maintenance periods to bring on early failure of weak units.

Another commonly used computer tube was the 5965 double triode. This, according to a memorandum from MIT for Project Whirwind, was developed for IBM by General Electric, primarily for use in the IBM 701 calculator, and was designated as a general-purpose triode tube. Tubes using a European designation standard used letters to indicate heater voltage and construction, followed by an indicator of base type and series number; e.g. the ECC82 was a 6.3V (E) double triode (CC) with a noval base (8x), as was the ECC83. Special quality tubes placed the number immediately after the voltage letter; e.g. the European version of the 5965 was labeled E180CC.

The tubes developed for Whirlwind were later used in the giant SAGE air-defense computer system. By the late 1950s, it was routine for special-quality small-signal tubes to last for hundreds of thousands of hours if operated conservatively. This increased reliability and also made mid-cable amplifiers in submarine cables possible.

== Heat generation and cooling ==
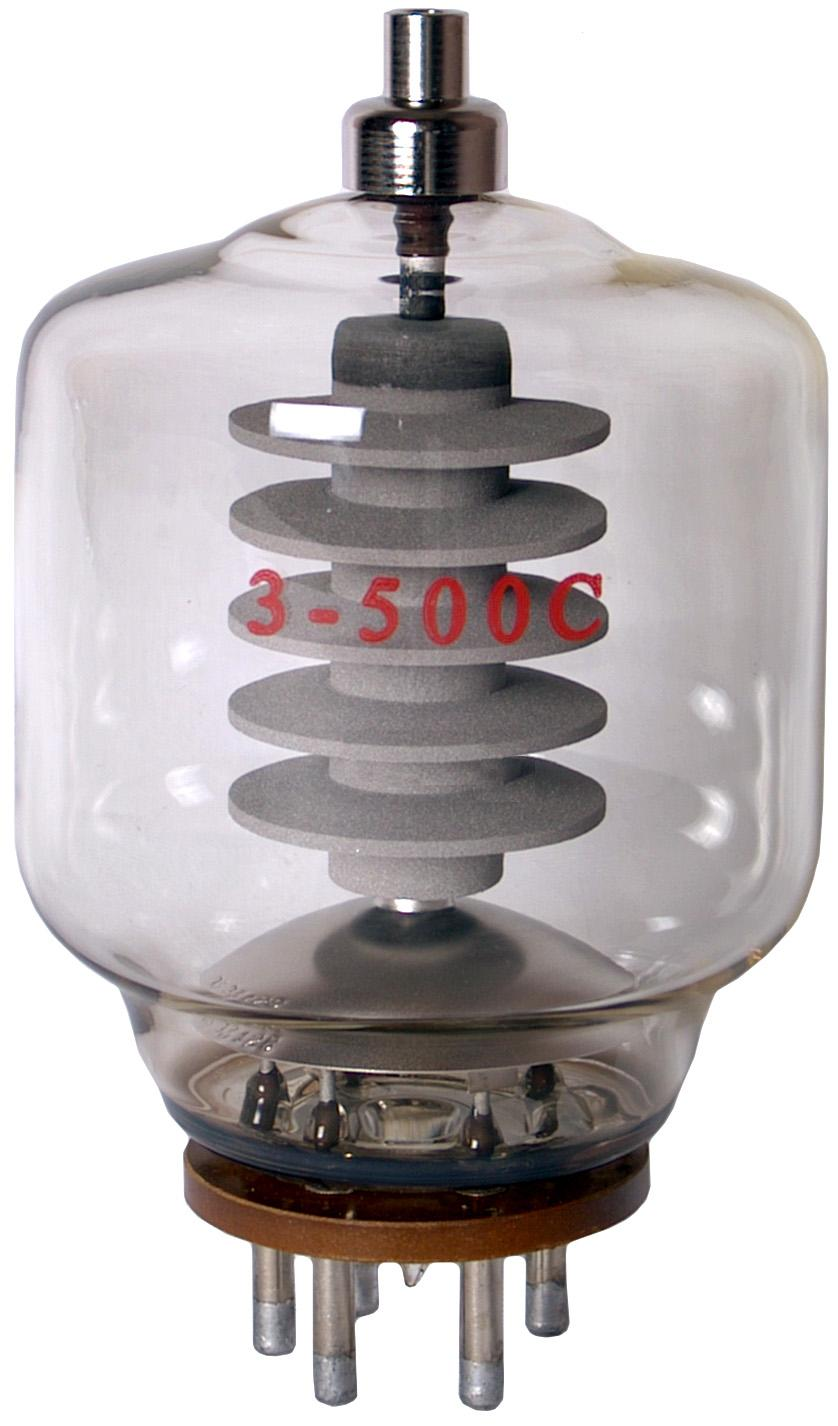
The anode (plate) of this transmitting triode has been designed to dissipate up to 500 W of heat.

A considerable amount of heat is produced when tubes operate, from both the filament (heater) and the stream of electrons bombarding the plate. In power amplifiers, this source of heat is greater than cathode heating. A few types of tube permit operation with the anodes at a dull red heat; in other types, red heat indicates severe overload.

The requirements for heat removal can significantly change the appearance of high-power vacuum tubes. High power audio amplifiers and rectifiers required larger envelopes to dissipate heat. Transmitting tubes could be much larger still.

Heat escapes the device by black-body radiation from the anode (plate) as infrared radiation, and by convection of air over the tube envelope. Convection is not possible inside most tubes since the anode is surrounded by vacuum.

Tubes which generate relatively little heat, such as the 1.4-volt filament directly heated tubes designed for use in battery-powered equipment, often have shiny metal anodes. 1T4, 1R5 and 1A7 are examples. Gas-filled tubes such as thyratrons may also use a shiny metal anode since the gas present inside the tube allows for heat convection from the anode to the glass enclosure.

The anode is often treated to make its surface emit more infrared energy. High-power amplifier tubes are designed with external anodes that can be cooled by convection, forced air or circulating water. The water-cooled 80 kg, 1.25 MW 8974 is among the largest commercial tubes available today.

In a water-cooled tube, the anode voltage appears directly on the cooling water surface, thus requiring the water to be an electrical insulator to prevent high voltage leakage through the cooling water to the radiator system. Water as usually supplied has ions that conduct electricity; deionized water, a good insulator, is required. Such systems usually have a built-in water-conductance monitor which will shut down the high-tension supply if the conductance becomes too high.

The screen grid may also generate considerable heat. Limits to screen grid dissipation, in addition to plate dissipation, are listed for power devices. If these are exceeded then tube failure is likely.

== Tube packages ==
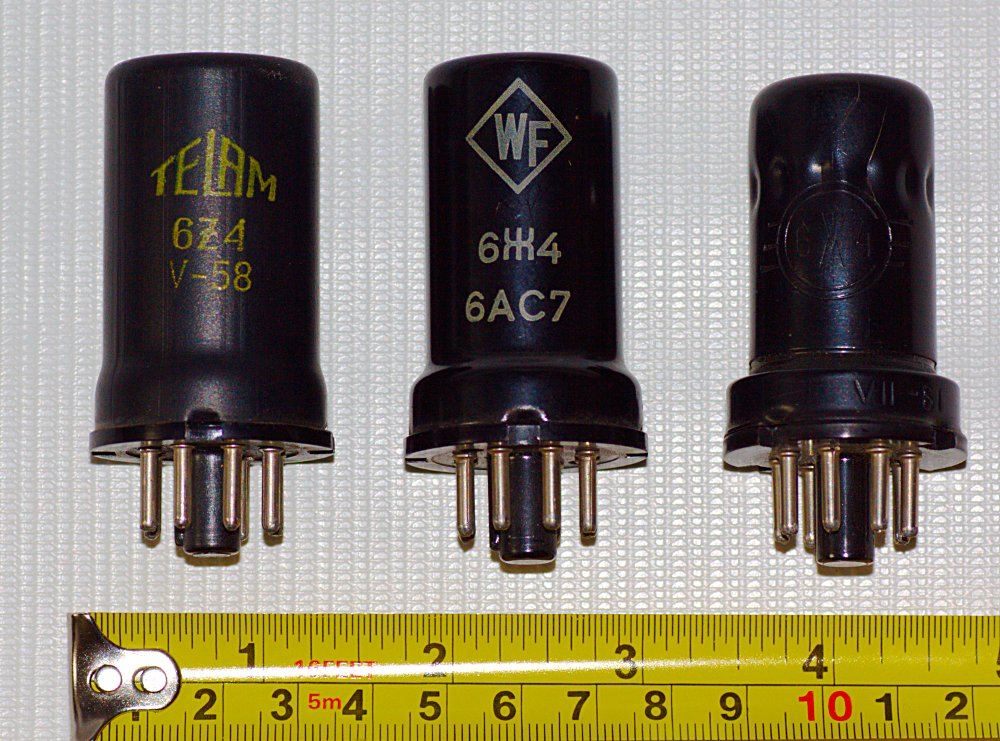
Metal-cased tubes with octal bases

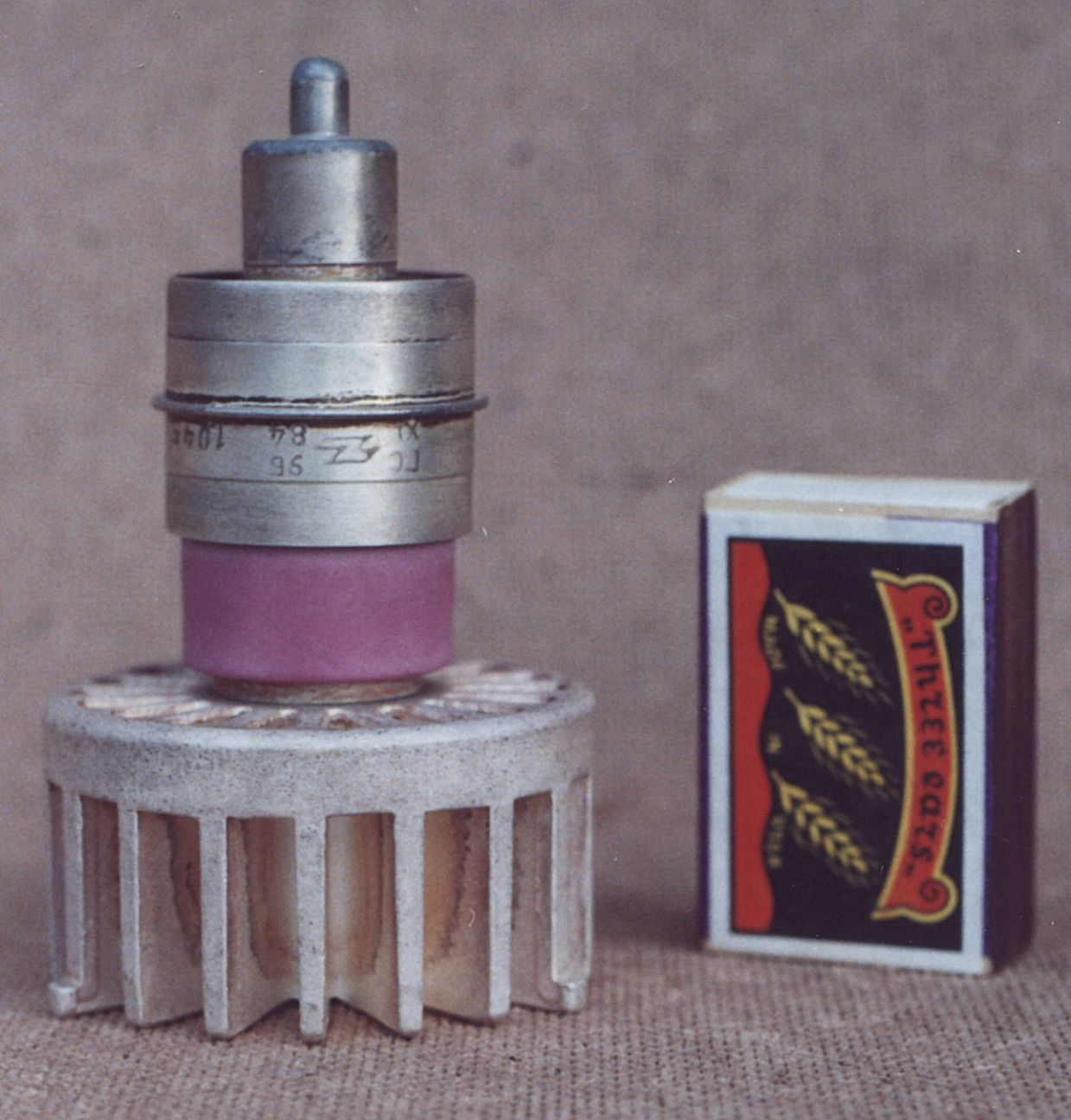
Triode tube type GS-9B; designed for use at radio frequencies up to 2000 MHz and rated for 300 watts anode power dissipation. The finned heat sink provides conduction of heat from anode to air stream.

Most modern tubes have glass envelopes, but metal, fused quartz (silica) and ceramic have also been used. A first version of the 6L6 used a metal envelope sealed with glass beads, while a glass disk fused to the metal was used in later versions. Metal and ceramic are used almost exclusively for power tubes above 2 kW dissipation. The nuvistor was a modern receiving tube using a very small metal and ceramic package.

The internal elements of tubes have always been connected to external circuitry via pins at their base which plug into a socket. Subminiature tubes were produced using wire leads rather than sockets; however, these were restricted to rather specialized applications. In addition to the connections at the base of the tube, many early triodes connected the grid using a metal cap at the top of the tube; this reduces stray capacitance between the grid and the plate leads. Tube caps were also used for the plate (anode) connection, particularly in transmitting tubes and tubes using a very high plate voltage.

High-power tubes such as transmitting tubes have packages designed more to enhance heat transfer. In some tubes, the metal envelope is also the anode. The 4CX1000A is an external anode tube of this sort. Air is blown through an array of fins attached to the anode, thus cooling it. Power tubes using this cooling scheme are available up to 150 kW dissipation. Above that level, water or water-vapor cooling are used. The highest-power tube currently available is the Eimac 4CM2500KG, a forced water-cooled power tetrode capable of dissipating 2.5 megawatts. By comparison, the largest power transistor can only dissipate about 1 kilowatt.

== Names ==
The generic name "[thermionic] valve" used in the UK derives from the unidirectional current flow allowed by the earliest device, the thermionic diode emitting electrons from a heated filament, by analogy with a non-return valve in a water pipe. The US names "vacuum tube", "electron tube", and "thermionic tube" all simply describe a tubular envelope which has been evacuated ("vacuum"), has a heater and controls electron flow.

In many cases, manufacturers and the military gave tubes designations that said nothing about their purpose (e.g., 1614). In the early days some manufacturers used proprietary names which might convey some information, but only about their products; the KT66 and KT88 were "kinkless tetrodes". Later, consumer tubes were given names that conveyed some information, with the same name often used generically by several manufacturers. In the US, Radio Electronics Television Manufacturers' Association (RETMA) designations comprise a number, followed by one or two letters, and a number. The first number is the (rounded) heater voltage; the letters designate a particular tube but say nothing about its structure; and the final number is the total number of electrodes (without distinguishing between, say, a tube with many electrodes, or two sets of electrodes in a single envelope – a double triode, for example). For example, the 12AX7 is a double triode (two sets of three electrodes plus heater) with a 12.6V heater (which can also be connected to run from 6.3V). The "AX" designates this tube's characteristics. Similar, but not identical, tubes are the 12AD7, 12AE7...12AT7, 12AU7, 12AV7, 12AW7 (rare), 12AY7, and the 12AZ7.

A system widely used in Europe known as the Mullard–Philips tube designation, also extended to transistors, uses a letter, followed by one or more further letters, and a number. The type designator specifies the heater voltage or current (one letter), the functions of all sections of the tube (one letter per section), the socket type (first digit), and the particular tube (remaining digits). For example, the ECC83 (equivalent to the 12AX7) is a 6.3V (E) double triode (CC) with a miniature base (8). In this system special-quality tubes (e.g., for long-life computer use) are indicated by moving the number immediately after the first letter: the E83CC is a special-quality equivalent of the ECC83, the E55L a power pentode with no consumer equivalent.

== Special-purpose tubes ==
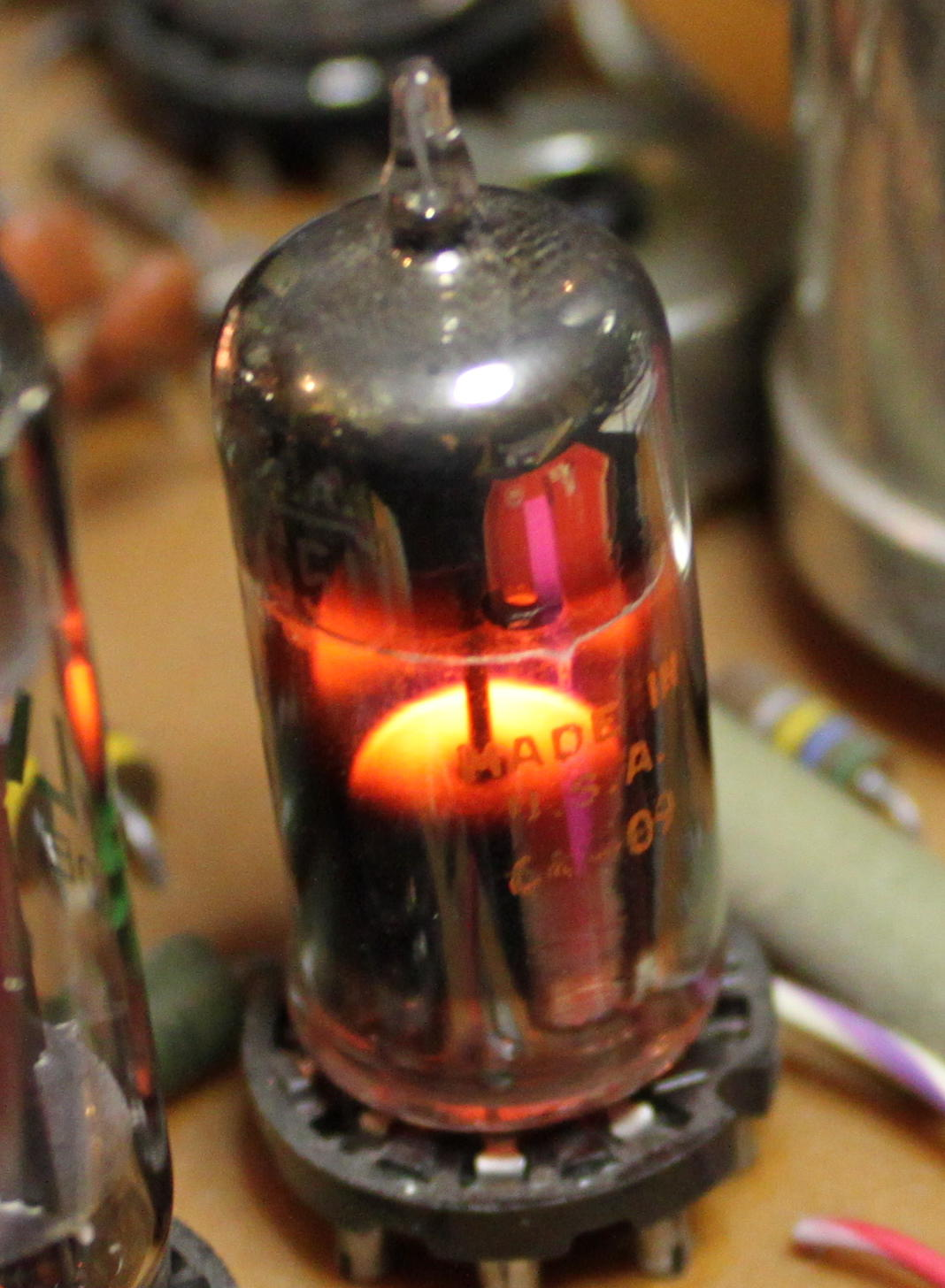
Voltage-regulator tube in operation. Low-pressure gas within tube glows due to current flow.

Some special-purpose tubes are constructed with particular gases in the envelope. For instance, voltage-regulator tubes contain various inert gases such as argon, helium or neon, which will ionize at predictable voltages. The thyratron is a special-purpose tube filled with low-pressure gas or mercury vapor. Like vacuum tubes, it contains a hot cathode and an anode, but also a control electrode which behaves somewhat like the grid of a triode. When the control electrode starts conduction, the gas ionizes, after which the control electrode can no longer stop the current; the tube "latches" into conduction. Removing anode (plate) voltage lets the gas de-ionize, restoring its non-conductive state.

Some thyratrons can carry large currents for their physical size. One example is the miniature type 2D21, often seen in 1950s jukeboxes as control switches for relays. A cold-cathode version of the thyratron, which uses a pool of mercury for its cathode, is called an ignitron; some can switch thousands of amperes. Thyratrons containing hydrogen have a very consistent time delay between their turn-on pulse and full conduction; they behave much like modern silicon-controlled rectifiers, also called thyristors due to their functional similarity to thyratrons. Hydrogen thyratrons have long been used in radar transmitters.

A specialized tube is the krytron, which is used for rapid high-voltage switching. Krytrons are used to initiate the detonations used to set off a nuclear weapon; krytrons are somewhat controlled at an international level, but since they also have commercial applications such as in metallurgy and triggering the flash lamps in high-end photocopiers they are not exactly hard to come by.

X-ray tubes are used in medical imaging among other uses. X-ray tubes used for continuous-duty operation in fluoroscopy and CT imaging equipment may use a focused cathode and a rotating anode to dissipate the large amounts of heat thereby generated. These are housed in an oil-filled aluminum housing to provide cooling.

The photomultiplier tube is an extremely sensitive detector of light, which uses the photoelectric effect and secondary emission, rather than thermionic emission, to generate and amplify electrical signals. Nuclear medicine imaging equipment and liquid scintillation counters use photomultiplier tube arrays to detect low-intensity scintillation due to ionizing radiation.

The Ignatron tube was used in resistance welding equipment in the early 1970s. The Ignatron had a cathode, anode and an igniter. The tube base was filled with mercury and the tube was used as a very high current switch. A large current potential was placed between the anode and cathode of the tube but was only permitted to conduct when the igniter in contact with the mercury had enough current to vaporize the mercury and complete the circuit. Because this was used in resistance welding there were two Ignatrons for the two phases of an AC circuit. Because of the mercury at the bottom of the tube they were extremely difficult to ship. These tubes were eventually replaced by SCRs (Silicon Controlled Rectifiers).

=== Use of radioactive materials ===
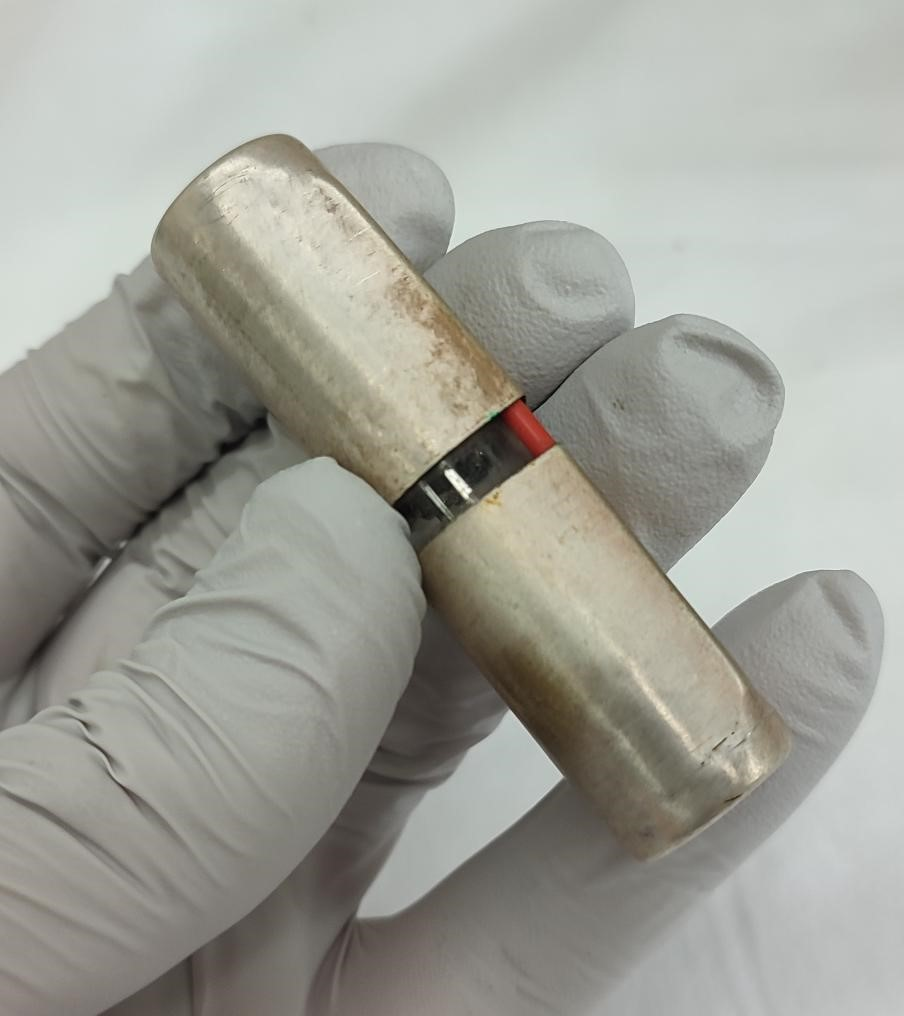
Zellweger glow tube that contains Radium-226 or Tritium. There are no indicators to alert to the presence of radioactive materials

Certain vacuum tubes have utilized radioactive materials to enhance their performance. These radioactive materials are used to ionize the fill gas within the tube. This ionization process ensures reliable and consistent operation by providing a steady current when a high voltage is applied, thereby improving the tube's performance and stability. The radioactive source speeds up the operation of the tube and ensures that the tube output is steady and not subject to random fluctuations by providing an instantaneous current when a high voltage is applied.

The various radioactive sources that have been used in these devices include:

- Tritium (H-3)
- Carbon-14 (C-14)
- Cobalt-60 (Co-60)
- Nickel-63 (Ni-63)
- Krypton-85 (Kr-85)
- Cesium-137 (Cs-137)
- Promethium-147 (Pm-147)
- Lead-210 (Pb-210)
- Radium-226 (Ra-226)
- Thorium-232 (Th-232)

Examples include the Western Electric 346B tube, which contains radium-226, and the Zellweger ZE22/3 glow tube, which may contain either radium-226 or tritium.

== Powering the tube ==
=== Batteries ===
Batteries provided the voltages required by tubes in early radio sets. Three different voltages were generally required, using three different batteries designated as the A, B, and C battery. The "A" battery or LT (low-tension) battery provided the filament voltage. Tube heaters were designed for single, double or triple-cell lead-acid batteries, giving nominal heater voltages of 2 V, 4 V or 6 V. In portable radios, dry batteries were sometimes used with 1.5 or 1 V heaters. Reducing filament consumption improved the life span of batteries. By 1955 towards the end of the tube era, tubes using only 50 mA down to as little as 10 mA for the heaters had been developed.

The high voltage applied to the anode (plate) was provided by the "B" battery or the HT (high-tension) supply or battery. These were generally of dry cell construction and typically came in 22.5-, 45-, 67.5-, 90-, 120- or 135-volt versions. After the use of B-batteries was phased out and rectified line-power was employed to produce the high voltage needed by tubes' plates, the term "B+" persisted in the US when referring to the high voltage source. Most of the rest of the English speaking world refers to this supply as just HT (high tension).

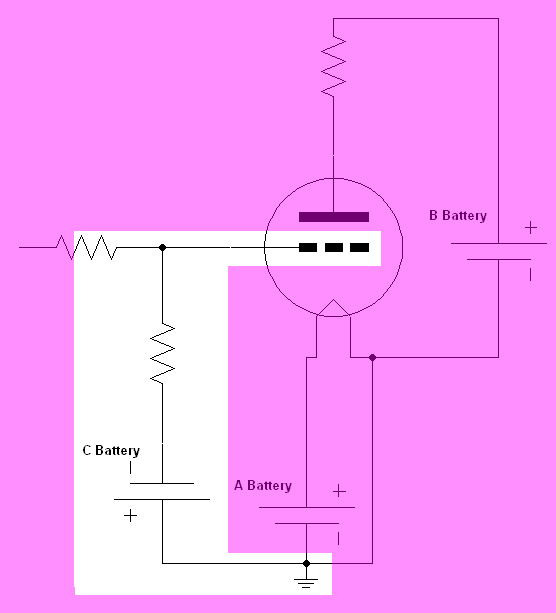
Three-battery array powering a vacuum-tube circuit (highlighting the "C" battery)

Early sets used a grid bias battery or "C" battery which was connected to provide a negative voltage. Since no current flows through a tube's grid connection, these batteries had no current drain and lasted the longest, usually limited by their own shelf life. The supply from the grid bias battery was rarely, if ever, disconnected when the radio was otherwise switched off. Even after AC power supplies became commonplace, some radio sets continued to be built with C batteries, as they would almost never need replacing. However more modern circuits were designed using cathode biasing, eliminating the need for a third power supply voltage; this became practical with tubes using indirect heating of the cathode along with the development of resistor/capacitor coupling which replaced earlier interstage transformers.

The "C battery" for bias is a designation having no relation to the "C cell" battery size.

=== AC power ===
Battery replacement was a major operating cost for early radio receiver users. The development of the battery eliminator, and, in 1925, batteryless receivers operated by household power, reduced operating costs and contributed to the growing popularity of radio. A power supply using a transformer with several windings, one or more rectifiers (which may themselves be vacuum tubes), and large filter capacitors provided the required direct current voltages from the alternating current source.

As a cost reduction measure, especially in high-volume consumer receivers, all the tube heaters could be connected in series across the AC supply using heaters requiring the same current and with a similar warm-up time. In one such design, a tap on the tube heater string supplied the 6 volts needed for the dial light. By deriving the high voltage from a half-wave rectifier directly connected to the AC mains, the heavy and costly power transformer was eliminated. This also allowed such receivers to operate on direct current, a so-called AC/DC receiver design. Many different US consumer AM radio manufacturers of the era used a virtually identical circuit, given the nickname All American Five.

Where the mains voltage was in the 100–120 V range, this limited voltage proved suitable only for low-power receivers. Television receivers either required a transformer or could use a voltage doubling circuit. Where 230 V nominal mains voltage was used, television receivers as well could dispense with a power transformer.

Transformer-less power supplies required safety precautions in their design to limit the shock hazard to users, such as electrically insulated cabinets and an interlock tying the power cord to the cabinet back, so the line cord was necessarily disconnected if the user or service person opened the cabinet. A cheater cord was a power cord ending in the special socket used by the safety interlock; servicers could then power the device with the hazardous voltages exposed.

To avoid the warm-up delay, "instant on" television receivers passed a small heating current through their tubes even when the set was nominally off. At switch on, full heating current was provided and the set would play almost immediately.

== Reliability ==
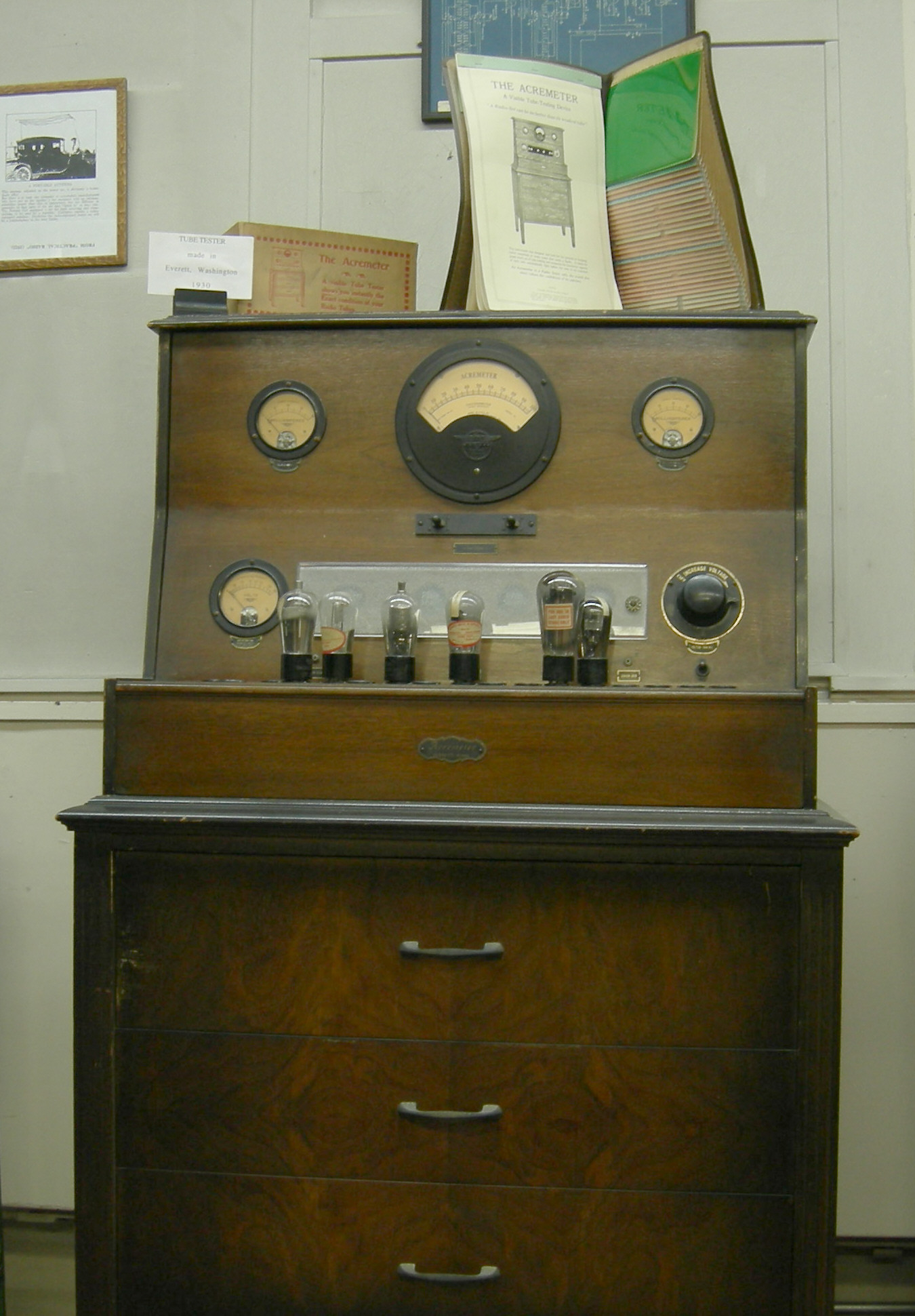
Tube tester manufactured in 1930

One reliability problem of tubes with oxide cathodes is the possibility that the cathode may slowly become "poisoned" by gas molecules from other elements in the tube, which reduce its ability to emit electrons. Trapped gases or slow gas leaks can also damage the cathode or cause plate (anode) current runaway due to ionization of free gas molecules. Vacuum hardness and proper selection of construction materials are the major influences on tube lifetime. Depending on the material, temperature and construction, the surface material of the cathode may also diffuse onto other elements. The resistive heaters that heat the cathodes may break in a manner similar to incandescent lamp filaments, but rarely do, since they operate at much lower temperatures than lamps.

The heater's failure mode is typically a stress-related fracture of the tungsten wire or at a weld point and generally occurs after accruing many thermal (power on-off) cycles. Tungsten wire has a very low resistance when at room temperature. A negative temperature coefficient device, such as a thermistor, may be incorporated in the equipment's heater supply or a ramp-up circuit may be employed to allow the heater or filaments to reach operating temperature more gradually than if powered-up in a step-function. Low-cost radios had tubes with heaters connected in series, with a total voltage equal to that of the line (mains). Some receivers made before World War II had series-string heaters with total voltage less than that of the mains. Some had a resistance wire running the length of the power cord to drop the voltage to the tubes. Others had series resistors made like regular tubes; they were called ballast tubes.

Following World War II, tubes intended to be used in series heater strings were redesigned to all have the same ("controlled") warm-up time. Earlier designs had quite-different thermal time constants. The audio output stage, for instance, had a larger cathode and warmed up more slowly than lower-powered tubes. The result was that heaters that warmed up faster also temporarily had higher resistance, because of their positive temperature coefficient. This disproportionate resistance caused them to temporarily operate with heater voltages well above their ratings, and shortened their life.

Another important reliability problem is caused by air leakage into the tube. Usually oxygen in the air reacts chemically with the hot filament or cathode, quickly ruining it. Designers developed tube designs that sealed reliably. This was why most tubes were constructed of glass. Metal alloys (such as Cunife and Fernico) and glasses had been developed for light bulbs that expanded and contracted in similar amounts, as temperature changed. These made it easy to construct an insulating envelope of glass, while passing connection wires through the glass to the electrodes.

When a vacuum tube is overloaded or operated past its design dissipation, its anode (plate) may glow red. In consumer equipment, a glowing plate is universally a sign of an overloaded tube. However, some large transmitting tubes are designed to operate with their anodes at red, orange, or in rare cases, white heat

The longest recorded valve life was of a Mazda AC/P pentode valve (serial No. 4418) in operation at the BBC's main Northern Ireland transmitter at Lisnagarvey. The valve was in service from 1935 until 1961 and had a recorded life of 232,592 hours. The BBC maintained meticulous records of their valves' lives with periodic returns to their central valve stores.

=== Special quality ===
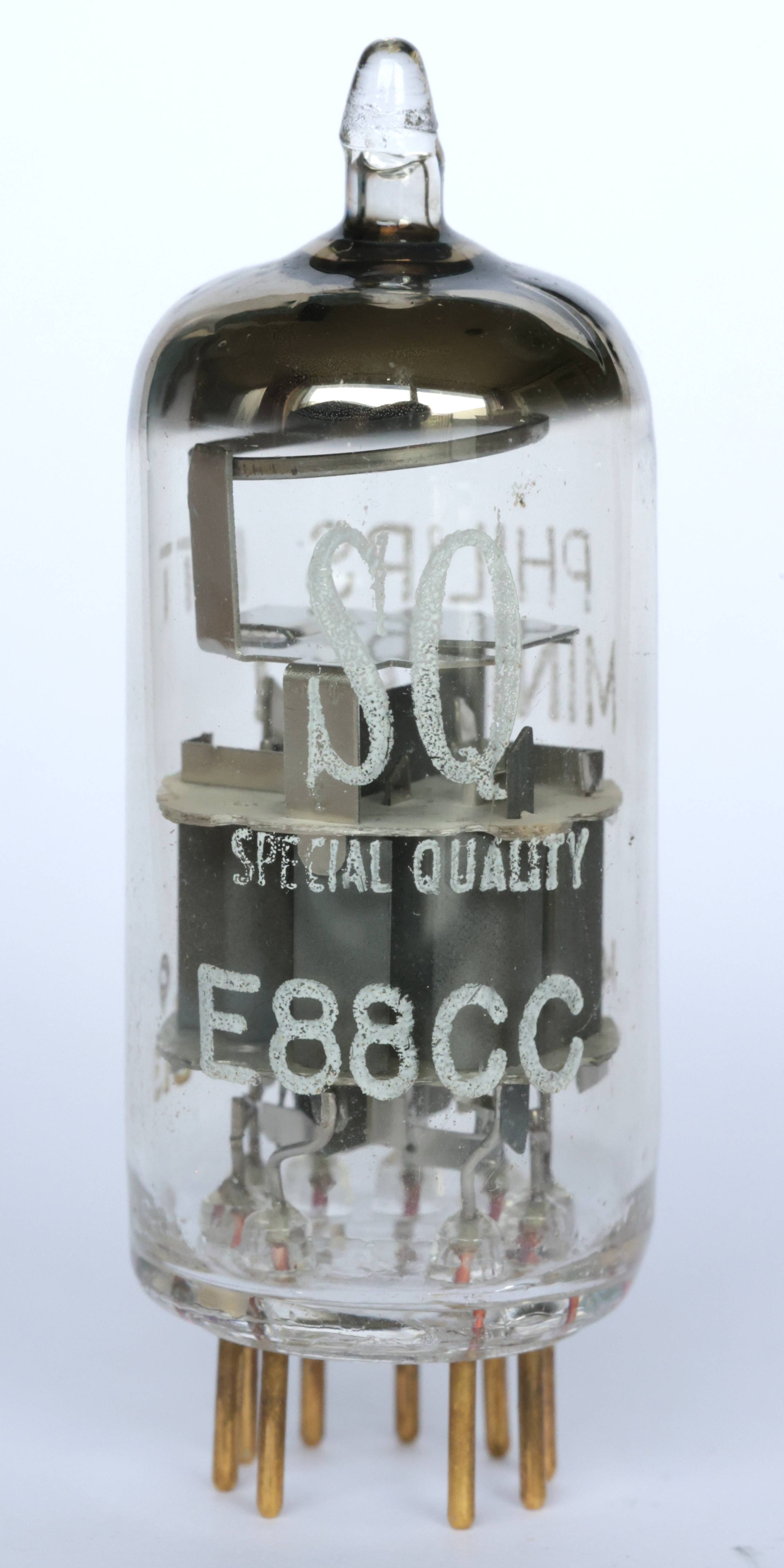
Special Quality E88CC by Philips

"Special quality" tubes were made for some applications, designed for improved performance in some respect, such as a longer life cathode, low noise construction, mechanical ruggedness via ruggedized filaments, low microphony, for applications where the tube will spend much of its time cut off, etc. Some special quality tubes were specialised versions of standard tubes, while others were purpose-designed. "Special quality" does not mean "better in all respects", but that certain characteristics have been optimised; the only way to know the particular features of a special quality part is by reading the datasheet. In particular, tubes made for computing use are designed for long life when used biased to cut-off most of the time, but significant hum, microphony and noise—very undesirable in audio applications—are not important. Names may reflect the name of an equivalent standard tube, if there is one (12AU7==>12AU7A, ECC82==>E82CC, etc.), or be absolutely anything (standard and special-quality equivalents of the same tube include 12AU7, ECC82, B329, CV491, E2163, E82CC, E812CC, M8136, CV4003, 6067, VX7058, 5814A and 12AU7A). In the European Mullard–Philips tube designation special-quality tubes move the numeric part immediately after the first letter; the E82CC is an ECC82 optimised for computer applications.

=== Vacuum ===
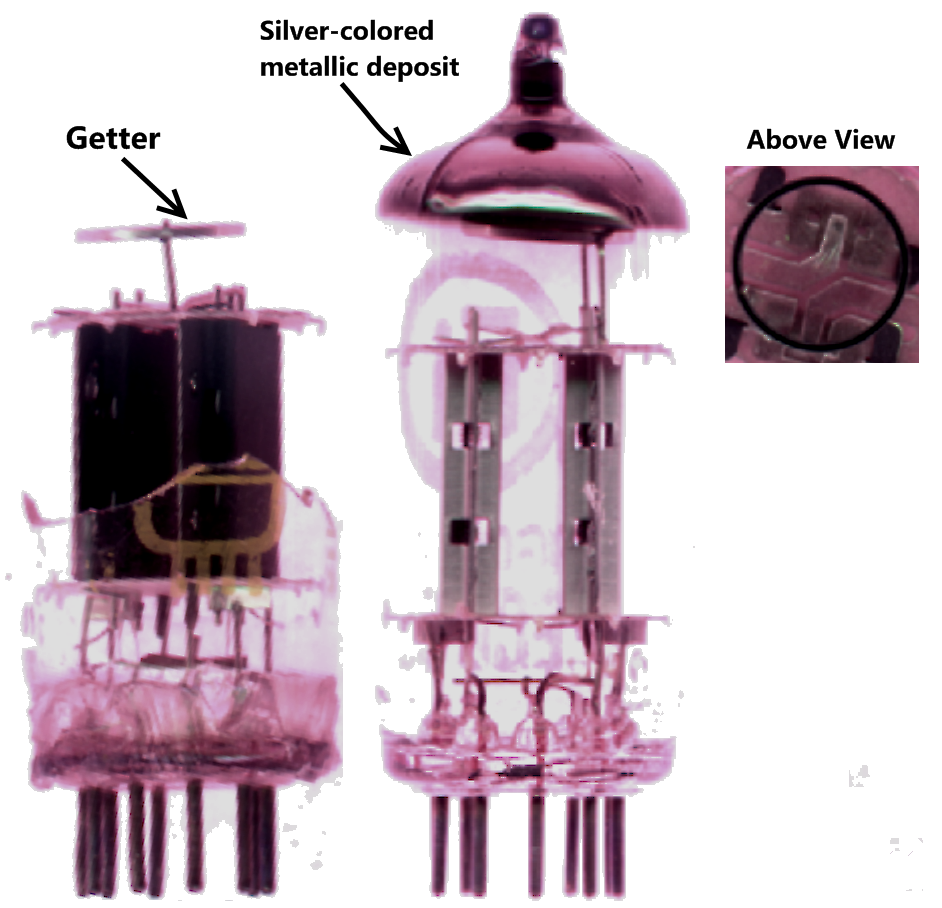
Getter in opened tube; silvery deposit from getter

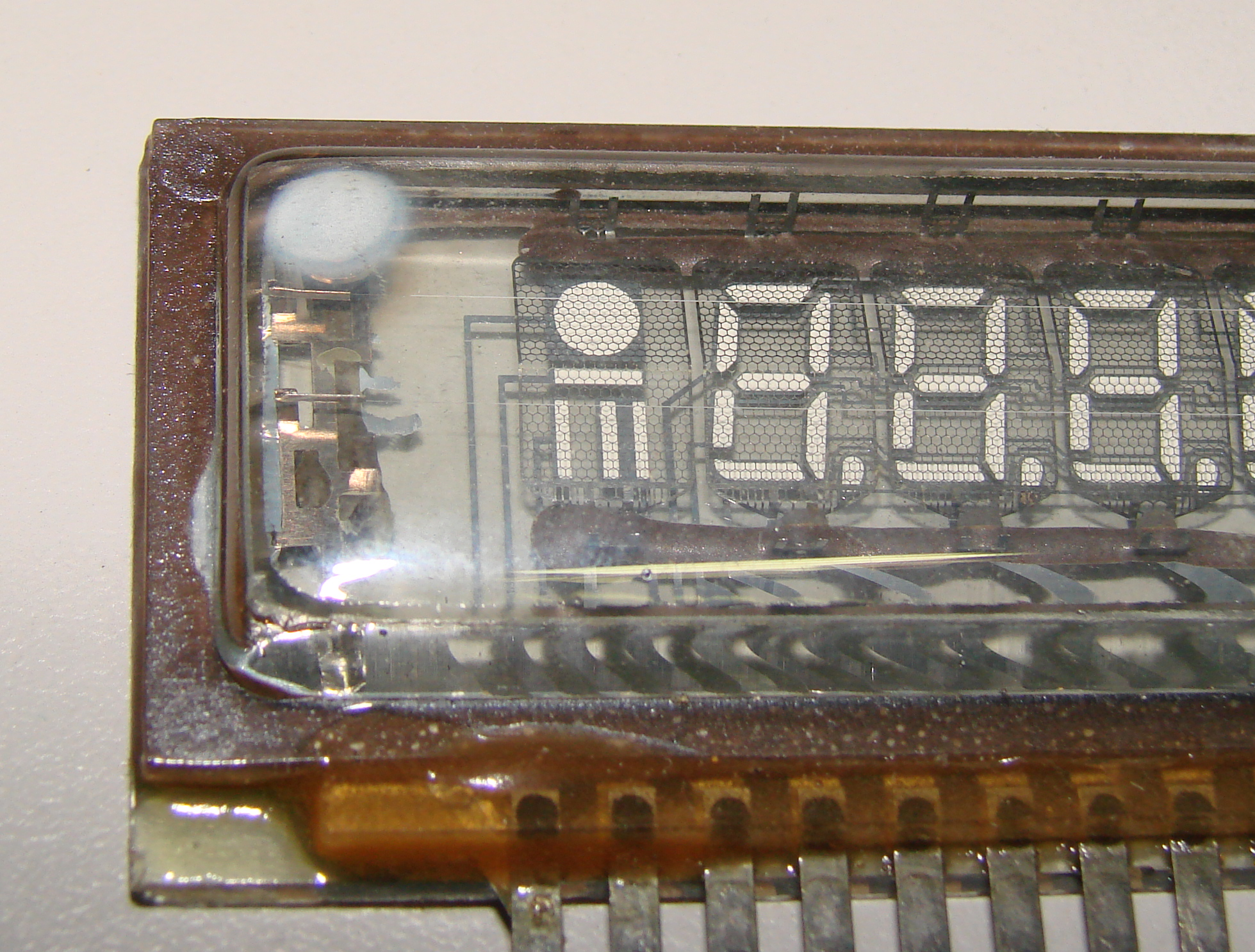
Dead vacuum fluorescent display (Air has leaked in and the getter spot has become white.)

A vacuum tube needs an extremely high vacuum (or hard vacuum, from X-ray terminology) to avoid the consequences of generating positive ions within the tube. Residual gas atoms ionize when struck by an electron and can adversely affect the cathode, reducing emission. Larger amounts of residual gas can create a visible glow discharge between the tube electrodes and cause overheating of the electrodes, producing more gas, damaging the tube and possibly other components due to excess current. To avoid these effects, the residual pressure within the tube must be low enough that the mean free path of an electron is much longer than the size of the tube (so an electron is unlikely to strike a residual atom and very few ionized atoms will be present). Commercial vacuum tubes are evacuated at manufacture to about 0.000001 mmHg (1.0×10^{−6} Torr; 130 μPa; 1.3×10^{−6} mbar; 1.3×10^{−9} atm).

To prevent gases from compromising the tube's vacuum, modern tubes are constructed with getters, which are usually metals that oxidize quickly, barium being the most common. For glass tubes, while the tube envelope is being evacuated, the internal parts except the getter are heated by RF induction heating to evolve any remaining gas from the metal parts. The tube is then sealed and the getter trough or pan, for flash getters, is heated to a high temperature, again by radio frequency induction heating, which causes the getter material to vaporize and react with any residual gas. The vapor is deposited on the inside of the glass envelope, leaving a silver-colored metallic patch that continues to absorb small amounts of gas that may leak into the tube during its working life. Great care is taken with the valve design to ensure this material is not deposited on any of the working electrodes. If a tube develops a serious leak in the envelope, this deposit turns a white color as it reacts with atmospheric oxygen. Large transmitting and specialized tubes often use more exotic getter materials, such as zirconium. Early gettered tubes used phosphorus-based getters, and these tubes are easily identifiable, as the phosphorus leaves a characteristic orange or rainbow deposit on the glass. The use of phosphorus was short-lived and was quickly replaced by the superior barium getters. Unlike the barium getters, the phosphorus did not absorb any further gases once it had fired.

Getters act by chemically combining with residual or infiltrating gases, but are unable to counteract (non-reactive) inert gases. A known problem, mostly affecting valves with large envelopes such as cathode-ray tubes and camera tubes such as iconoscopes, orthicons, and image orthicons, comes from helium infiltration. The effect appears as impaired or absent functioning, and as a diffuse glow along the electron stream inside the tube. This effect cannot be rectified (short of re-evacuation and resealing), and is responsible for working examples of such tubes becoming rarer and rarer. Unused ("New Old Stock") tubes can also exhibit inert gas infiltration, so there is no long-term guarantee of these tube types surviving into the future.

=== Transmitting tubes ===
Large transmitting tubes have carbonized tungsten filaments containing a small trace (1% to 2%) of thorium. An extremely thin (molecular) layer of thorium atoms forms on the outside of the wire's carbonized layer and, when heated, serve as an efficient source of electrons. The thorium slowly evaporates from the wire surface, while new thorium atoms diffuse to the surface to replace them. Such thoriated tungsten cathodes usually deliver lifetimes in the tens of thousands of hours. The end-of-life scenario for a thoriated-tungsten filament is when the carbonized layer has mostly been converted back into another form of tungsten carbide and emission begins to drop off rapidly; a complete loss of thorium has never been found to be a factor in the end-of-life in a tube with this type of emitter. WAAY-TV in Huntsville, Alabama achieved 163,000 hours (18.6 years) of service from an Eimac external cavity klystron in the visual circuit of its transmitter; this is the highest documented service life for this type of tube. It has been said that transmitters with vacuum tubes are better able to survive lightning strikes than transistor transmitters do. While it was commonly believed that vacuum tubes were more efficient than solid-state circuits at RF power levels above approximately 20 kilowatts, this is no longer the case, especially in medium wave (AM broadcast) service where solid-state transmitters at nearly all power levels have measurably higher efficiency. FM broadcast transmitters with solid-state power amplifiers up to approximately 15 kW also show better overall power efficiency than tube-based power amplifiers.

=== Receiving tubes ===
Cathodes in small "receiving" tubes are coated with a mixture of barium oxide and strontium oxide, sometimes with addition of calcium oxide or aluminium oxide. An electric heater is inserted into the cathode sleeve and insulated from it electrically by a coating of aluminum oxide. This complex construction causes barium and strontium atoms to diffuse to the surface of the cathode and emit electrons when heated to about 780 degrees Celsius (1400 °F).

=== Failure modes ===
==== Catastrophic failures ====
A catastrophic failure is one that suddenly makes the vacuum tube unusable. A crack in the glass envelope will allow air into the tube and destroy it. Cracks may result from stress in the glass, bent pins or impacts; tube sockets must allow for thermal expansion, to prevent stress in the glass at the pins. Stress may accumulate if a metal shield or other object presses on the tube envelope and causes differential heating of the glass. Glass may also be damaged by high-voltage arcing.

Tube heaters may also fail without warning, especially if exposed to over voltage or as a result of manufacturing defects. Tube heaters do not normally fail by evaporation like lamp filaments since they operate at much lower temperature. The surge of inrush current when the heater is first energized causes stress in the heater and can be avoided by slowly warming the heaters, gradually increasing current with a NTC thermistor included in the circuit. Tubes intended for series-string operation of the heaters across the supply have a specified controlled warm-up time to avoid excess voltage on some heaters as others warm up. Directly heated filament-type cathodes as used in battery-operated tubes or some rectifiers may fail if the filament sags, causing internal arcing. Excess heater-to-cathode voltage in indirectly heated cathodes can break down the insulation between elements and destroy the heater.

Arcing between tube elements can destroy the tube. An arc can be caused by applying voltage to the anode (plate) before the cathode has come up to operating temperature, or by drawing excess current through a rectifier, which damages the emission coating. Arcs can also be initiated by any loose material inside the tube, or by excess screen voltage. An arc inside the tube allows gas to evolve from the tube materials, and may deposit conductive material on internal insulating spacers.

Tube rectifiers have limited current capability and exceeding ratings will eventually destroy a tube.

==== Degenerative failures ====
Degenerative failures are those caused by the slow deterioration of performance over time.

Overheating of internal parts, such as control grids or mica spacer insulators, can result in trapped gas escaping into the tube; this can reduce performance. A getter is used to absorb gases evolved during tube operation but has only a limited ability to combine with gas. Control of the envelope temperature prevents some types of gassing. A tube with an unusually high level of internal gas may exhibit a visible blue glow when plate voltage is applied. The getter (being a highly reactive metal) is effective against many atmospheric gases but has no (or very limited) chemical reactivity to inert gases such as helium. One progressive type of failure, especially with physically large envelopes such as those used by camera tubes and cathode-ray tubes, comes from helium infiltration. The exact mechanism is not clear: the metal-to-glass lead-in seals are one possible infiltration site.

Gas and ions within the tube contribute to grid current which can disturb operation of a vacuum-tube circuit. Another effect of overheating is the slow deposit of metallic vapors on internal spacers, resulting in inter-element leakage.

Tubes on standby for long periods, with heater voltage applied, may develop high cathode interface resistance and display poor emission characteristics. This effect occurred especially in pulse and digital circuits, where tubes had no plate current flowing for extended times. Tubes designed specifically for this mode of operation were made.

Cathode depletion is the loss of emission after thousands of hours of normal use. Sometimes emission can be restored for a time by raising heater voltage, either for a short time or a permanent increase of a few percent. Cathode depletion was uncommon in signal tubes but was a frequent cause of failure of monochrome television cathode-ray tubes. Usable life of this expensive component was sometimes extended by fitting a boost transformer to increase heater voltage.

==== Other failures ====
Vacuum tubes may develop defects in operation that make an individual tube unsuitable in a given device, although it may perform satisfactorily in another application. Microphonics refers to internal vibrations of tube elements which modulate the tube's signal in an undesirable way; sound or vibration pick-up may affect the signals, or even cause uncontrolled howling if a feedback path (with greater than unity gain) develops between a microphonic tube and, for example, a loudspeaker. Leakage current between AC heaters and the cathode may couple into the circuit, or electrons emitted directly from the ends of the heater may also inject hum into the signal. Leakage current due to internal contamination may also inject noise. Some of these effects make tubes unsuitable for small-signal audio use, although unobjectionable for other purposes. Selecting the best of a batch of nominally identical tubes for critical applications can produce better results.

Tube pins can develop non-conducting or high resistance surface films due to heat or dirt. Pins can be cleaned to restore conductance.

== Testing ==
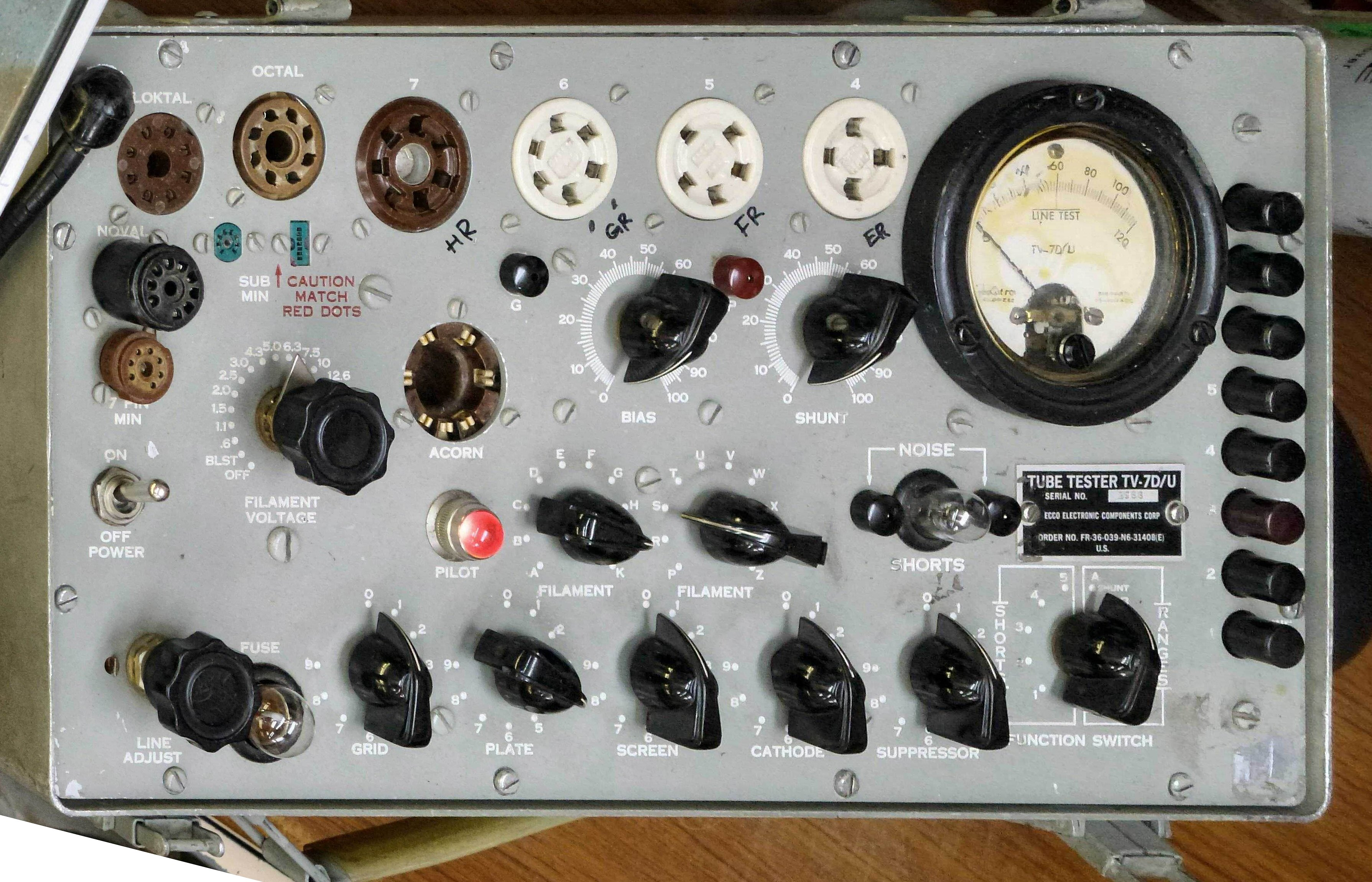
Universal vacuum tube tester

Vacuum tubes can be tested outside of their circuitry using a vacuum tube tester.

== Other vacuum tube devices ==
Most small signal vacuum tube devices have been superseded by semiconductors, but some vacuum tube electronic devices are still in common use. The magnetron is the type of tube used in all microwave ovens. In spite of the advancing state of the art in power semiconductor technology, the vacuum tube still has reliability and cost advantages for high-frequency RF power generation.

Some tubes, such as magnetrons, traveling-wave tubes, Carcinotrons, and klystrons, combine magnetic and electrostatic effects. These are efficient (usually narrow-band) RF generators and still find use in radar, microwave ovens and industrial heating. Traveling-wave tubes (TWTs) are very good amplifiers and are even used in some communications satellites. High-powered klystron amplifier tubes can provide hundreds of kilowatts in the UHF range.

=== Cathode-ray tubes ===
The cathode-ray tube (CRT) is a vacuum tube used particularly for display purposes. Although there were previously many televisions and computer monitors using cathode-ray tubes, most of these have since been replaced by flat panel displays as their prices dropped and quality increased. This is also true of digital oscilloscopes (based on internal computers and analog-to-digital converters), although traditional analog scopes (dependent upon CRTs) continue to be produced, are economical, and preferred by many technicians. At one time many radios used "magic eye tubes", a specialized sort of CRT used in place of a meter movement to indicate signal strength or input level in a tape recorder. A modern indicator device, the vacuum fluorescent display (VFD) is also a sort of cathode-ray tube.

The X-ray tube is a type of cathode-ray tube that generates X-rays when high voltage electrons hit the anode.

Gyrotrons or vacuum masers, used to generate high-power millimeter band waves, are magnetic vacuum tubes in which a small relativistic effect, due to the high voltage, is used for bunching the electrons. Gyrotrons can generate very high powers (hundreds of kilowatts)., Free-electron lasers, used to generate high-power coherent light and even X-rays, are highly relativistic vacuum tubes driven by high-energy particle accelerators. Thus, these are sorts of cathode-ray tubes.

=== Electron multipliers ===
A photomultiplier is a phototube whose sensitivity is greatly increased through the use of electron multiplication. This works on the principle of secondary emission, whereby a single electron emitted by the photocathode strikes a special sort of anode known as a dynode causing more electrons to be released from that dynode. Those electrons are accelerated toward another dynode at a higher voltage, releasing more secondary electrons; as many as 15 such stages provide a huge amplification. Despite great advances in solid-state photodetectors (e.g. Single-photon avalanche diode), the single-photon detection capability of photomultiplier tubes makes this vacuum tube device excel in certain applications. Such a tube can also be used for detection of ionizing radiation as an alternative to the Geiger–Müller tube (itself not an actual vacuum tube). Historically, the image orthicon TV camera tube widely used in television studios prior to the development of modern CCD arrays also used multistage electron multiplication.

For decades, electron-tube designers tried to augment amplifying tubes with electron multipliers in order to increase gain, but these suffered from short life because the material used for the dynodes "poisoned" the tube's hot cathode. (For instance, the interesting RCA 1630 secondary-emission tube was marketed, but did not last.) However, eventually, Philips of the Netherlands developed the EFP60 tube that had a satisfactory lifetime and was used in at least one product, a laboratory pulse generator. By that time, however, transistors were rapidly improving, making such developments superfluous.

One variant called a "channel electron multiplier" does not use individual dynodes but consists of a curved tube, such as a helix, coated on the inside with material with good secondary emission. One type had a funnel of sorts to capture the secondary electrons. The continuous dynode was resistive, and its ends were connected to enough voltage to create repeated cascades of electrons. The microchannel plate consists of an array of single stage electron multipliers over an image plane; several of these can then be stacked. This can be used, for instance, as an image intensifier in which the discrete channels substitute for focusing.

Tektronix made a high-performance wideband oscilloscope CRT with a channel electron multiplier plate behind the phosphor layer. This plate was a bundled array of a huge number of short individual c.e.m. tubes that accepted a low-current beam and intensified it to provide a display of practical brightness. (The electron optics of the wideband electron gun could not provide enough current to directly excite the phosphor.)

== Vacuum tubes in the 21st century ==
=== Industrial, commercial, and military niche applications ===
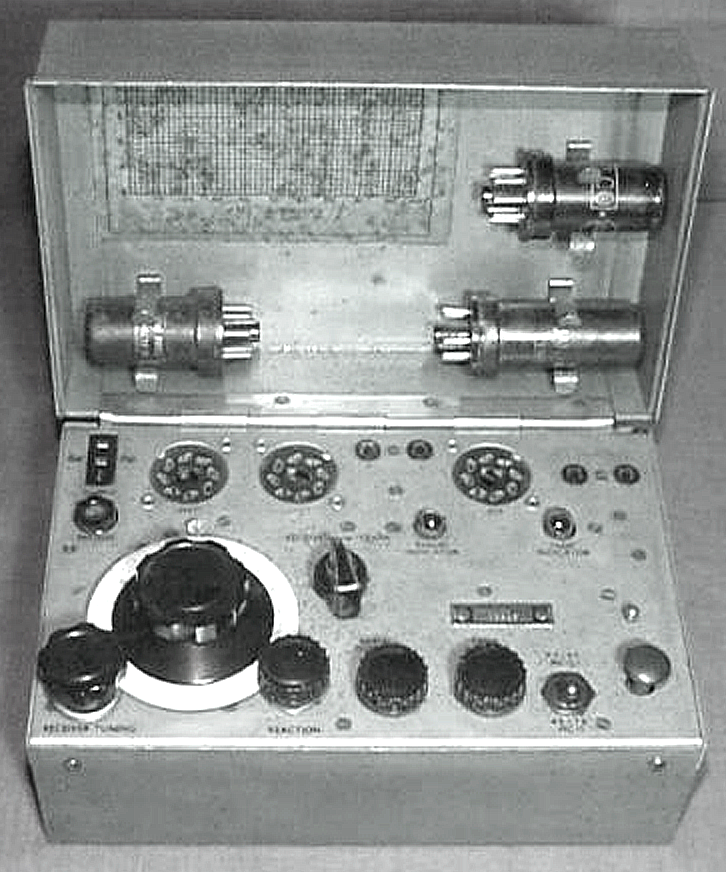
Paraset Mk. VII/2 clandestine radio

Although vacuum tubes have been largely replaced by solid-state devices in most amplifying, switching, and rectifying applications, there are certain exceptions. In addition to the special functions noted above, tubes still have some niche applications.

In general, vacuum tubes are much less susceptible than corresponding solid-state components to transient overvoltages, such as mains voltage surges or lightning, extreme temperatures and the electromagnetic pulse effect of nuclear explosions, or geomagnetic storms produced by giant solar flares. This property kept them in use for certain military applications long after more practical and less expensive solid-state technology was available for the same applications, as for example with the MiG-25 aircraft. as they were easy to replace in remote airfields where transistors may not be readily available if maintenance were required.

Vacuum tubes are practical alternatives to solid-state devices in generating high power at radio frequencies in applications such as industrial radio frequency heating, particle accelerators, and broadcast transmitters. This is particularly true at microwave frequencies where such devices as the klystron and traveling-wave tube provide amplification at power levels unattainable using current semiconductor devices. The household microwave oven uses a magnetron tube to efficiently generate hundreds of watts of microwave power. Solid-state devices such as gallium nitride are promising replacements, but are very expensive and in early stages of development.

In military applications, a high-power vacuum tube can generate a 10–100 megawatt signal that can burn out an unprotected receiver's frontend. Such devices are considered non-nuclear electromagnetic weapons; they were introduced in the late 1990s by both the U.S. and Russia.

=== In music ===
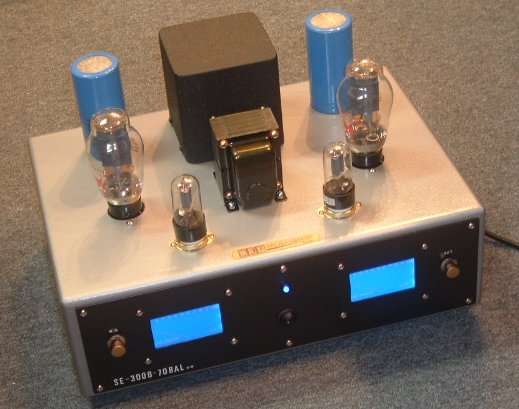
70-watt tube-hybrid audio amplifier

Tube amplifiers remain commercially viable in three niches where their warm sound, performance when overdriven, and ability to replicate prior-era tube-based recording are prized: audiophile equipment, musical instrument amplifiers, and devices used in recording studios.

Many guitarists prefer using valve amplifiers to solid-state models, often due to the way they tend to distort when overdriven. Any amplifier can only accurately amplify a signal to a certain volume; past this limit, the amplifier will begin to distort the signal. Different circuits will distort the signal in different ways; some guitarists prefer the distortion characteristics of vacuum tubes. Most popular vintage models use vacuum tubes.

A UK company, Blackburn MicroTech Solutions, developed radically different versions of standard tubes for the audiophile market. Instead of using a tubular construction with radial electron flow, the design was planar. The first product was the E813CC double triode, interchangeable with the ECC83. However, the company failed in 2009, a few months after introducing the E813CC.

=== Displays ===
==== Cathode-ray tube ====
The cathode-ray tube was the dominant display technology for televisions and computer monitors at the start of the 21st century. However, rapid advances and falling prices of LCD flat panel technology soon took the place of CRTs in these devices. By 2010, most CRT production had ended.

=== Vacuum tubes using field electron emitters ===
In the early years of the 21st century there has been renewed interest in vacuum tubes, this time with the electron emitter formed on a flat silicon substrate, as in integrated circuit technology. This subject is now called vacuum nanoelectronics. The most common design uses a cold cathode in the form of a large-area field electron source (for example a field emitter array). With these devices, electrons are field-emitted from a large number of closely spaced individual emission sites.

Such integrated microtubes may find application in microwave devices including mobile phones, for Bluetooth and Wi-Fi transmission, and in radar and satellite communication. As of 2012, they were being studied for possible applications in field emission display technology, but there were significant production problems.

As of 2014, NASA's Ames Research Center was reported to be working on vacuum-channel transistors produced using CMOS techniques.

== Characteristics ==
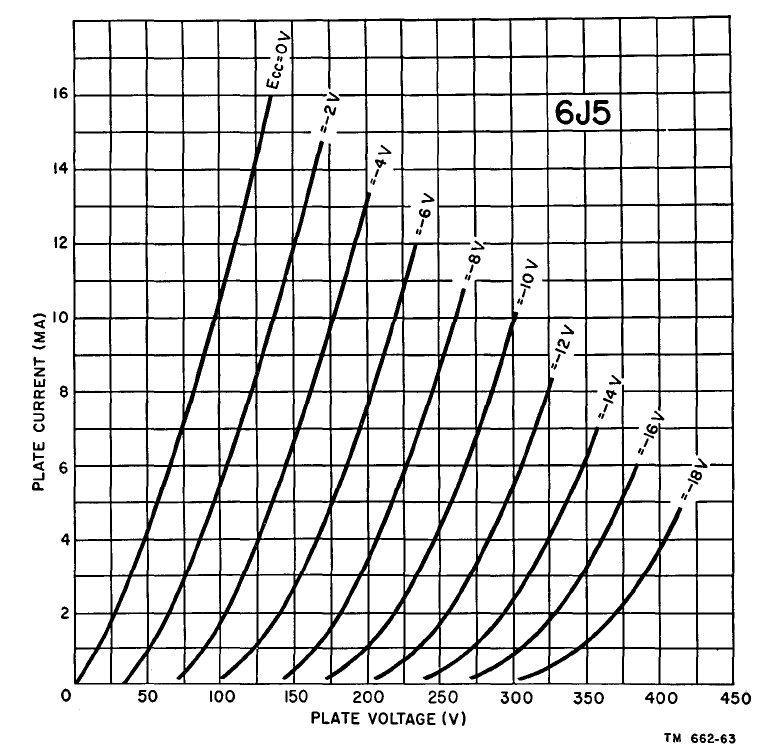
Typical triode plate characteristics

=== Space charge ===
When a cathode is heated and reaches an operating temperature around 1,050 K (780 °C; 1,430 °F), free electrons are driven from its surface. These free electrons form a cloud in the empty space between the cathode and the anode, known as the space charge. This space charge cloud supplies the electrons that create the current flow from the cathode to the anode. As electrons are drawn to the anode during the operation of the circuit, new electrons will boil off the cathode to replenish the space charge. The space charge is an example of an electric field.

=== Characteristic curves ===
All tubes with one or more control grids are controlled by an AC (Alternating Current) input voltage applied to the control grid, while the resulting amplified signal appears at the anode as a current. Due to the high voltage placed on the anode, a relatively small anode current can represent a considerable increase in energy over the value of the original signal voltage. The space charge electrons driven off the heated cathode are strongly attracted by the positive anode. The control grid(s) in a tube mediate this current flow by combining the small AC signal current with the grid's slightly negative value. When the signal sine (AC) wave is applied to the grid, it rides on this negative value, driving it both positive and negative as the AC signal wave changes.

This relationship is shown with a set of Plate Characteristics curves, (see example above,) which visually display how the output current from the anode (I_{a}) can be affected by a small input voltage applied on the grid (V_{g}), for any given voltage on the plate(anode) (V_{a}).

Every tube has a unique set of such characteristic curves. The curves graphically relate the changes to the instantaneous plate current driven by a much smaller change in the grid-to-cathode voltage (V_{gk}) as the input signal varies.

The V-I characteristic depends upon the size and material of the plate and cathode. Express the ratio between voltage plate and plate current.

- V-I curve (Voltage across filaments, plate current)
- Plate current, plate voltage characteristics
- DC plate resistance of the plate – resistance of the path between anode and cathode of direct current
- AC plate resistance of the plate – resistance of the path between anode and cathode of alternating current

=== Size of electrostatic field ===
Size of electrostatic field is the size between two or more plates in the tube.

== Patents ==
- U.S. patent 803,684 – Instrument for converting alternating electric currents into continuous currents (Fleming valve patent)
- U.S. patent 841,387 – Device for amplifying feeble electrical currents
- U.S. patent 879,532 – de Forest's three electrode Audion

== See also ==
- Bogey value – close to manufacturer's stated parameter values
- Fetron – a solid-state, plug-compatible, replacement for vacuum tubes
- List of vacuum tubes – a list of type numbers.
- List of vacuum-tube computers
- Mullard–Philips tube designation
- Nixie tube – a gas-filled display device sometimes misidentified as a vacuum tube
- RETMA tube designation
- RMA tube designation
- Russian tube designations
- Tube caddy
- Tube tester
- Valve amplifier
- Vacuum tube characteristics
- Zetatron

== Bibliography ==
- Gannon, Paul (2006). Colossus: Bletchley Park's Greatest Secret. London: Atlantic Books. ISBN 1-84354-330-3.
- Smith, Michael (1998). Station X: The Codebreakers of Bletchley Park. Channel 4 Books. ISBN 978-0-7522-2189-2.
