= Political positions of Paul Ryan =

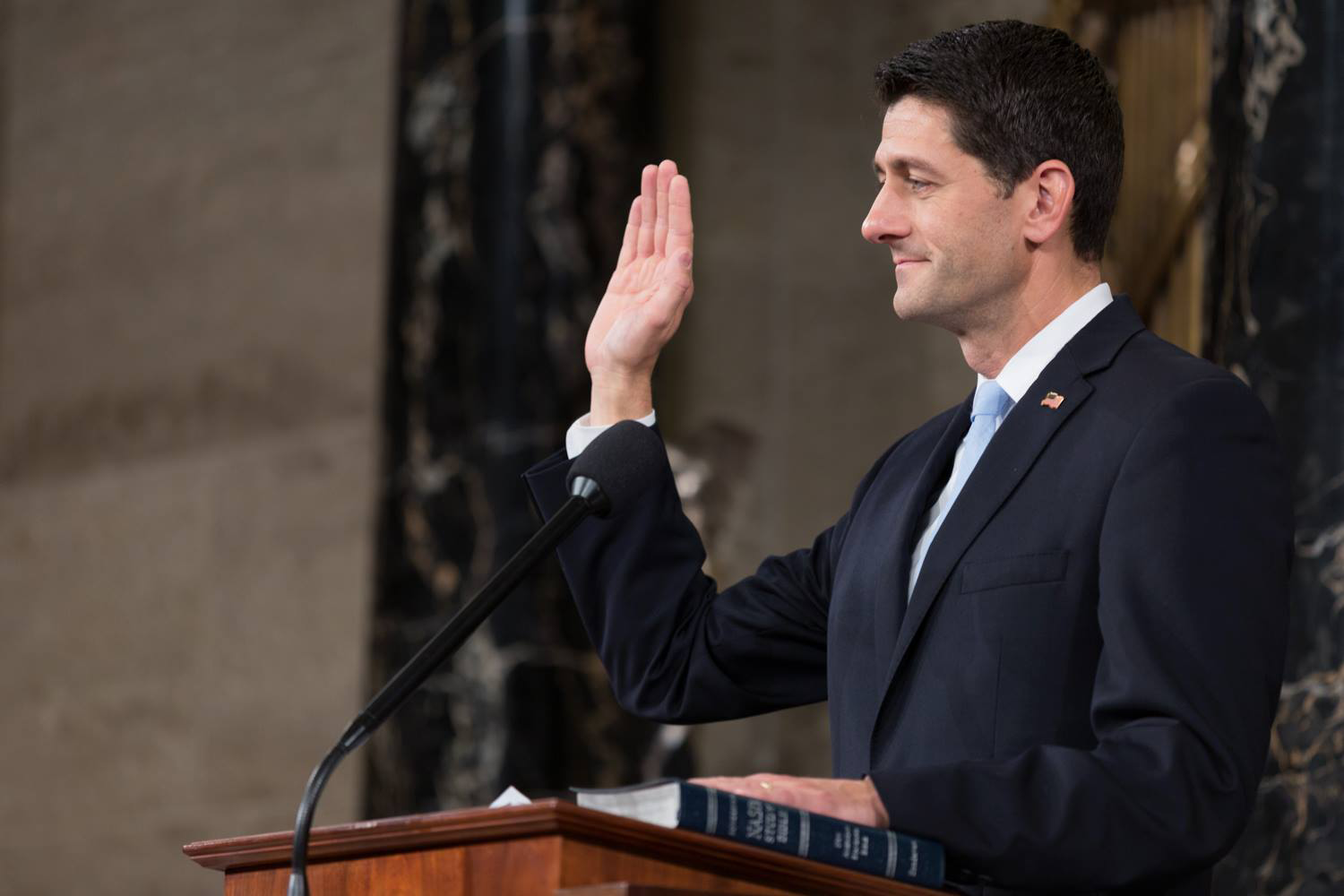
Paul Ryan takes his oath of office following his election as Speaker on October 29, 2015.

The political positions of Paul Ryan, the U.S. representative from Wisconsin's 1st congressional district from 1999 to 2019 and the 54th speaker of the United States House of Representatives from 2015 to 2019, were generally conservative, with a focus on fiscal policy. Ryan was Chairman of the House Budget Committee from 2011 to 2015 and of Ways and Means in 2015. Ryan was the Republican nominee for Vice President as the running mate of Mitt Romney in the 2012 presidential election.

Ryan supports eliminating the capital gains tax, the corporate income tax, the estate tax, and the Alternative Minimum Tax. In 1999, Ryan supported the Gramm–Leach–Bliley Act, which repealed some financial regulation of banks from the Glass–Steagall Act of 1933. During the economic recovery from the Great Recession of the late 2000s, Ryan supported the Troubled Asset Relief Program (TARP), which authorized the Treasury to purchase toxic assets from banks and other financial institutions, and the auto industry bailout; Ryan opposed the Credit CARD Act of 2009, which expanded consumer protections regarding credit card plans, and the Dodd–Frank Wall Street Reform and Consumer Protection Act, which strengthened financial regulation.

Ryan believes federal poverty reduction programs are ineffective and supports cuts to welfare, child care, Pell Grants, food stamps, and other federal assistance programs. Ryan supports block granting Medicaid to the states and the privatization of social security and Medicare. Ryan supported the Medicare Part D prescription drug benefit and opposes the Patient Protection and Affordable Care Act (ACA), also known as "Obamacare." Ryan supported the American Health Care Act of 2017 (AHCA), the House Republican plan to repeal and replace the ACA, which passed the House on May 4, 2017.

Ryan opposes abortion rights. Ryan opposed the Lilly Ledbetter Fair Pay Act of 2009, which bolstered women's rights to equal pay for equal work. Ryan supports same-sex adoption and civil unions, but opposes same-sex marriage. Ryan supports school vouchers, and supported the No Child Left Behind Act in 2001 and its repeal in 2015. Ryan is unsure, and believes climate scientists are unsure, of the impact of human activity on climate change. Ryan supports tax incentives for the petroleum industry and opposes them for renewable energy. Ryan supports gun rights and opposes stricter gun control. Ryan supported the wars in Iraq and Afghanistan.

== Conservatism and partisanship ==
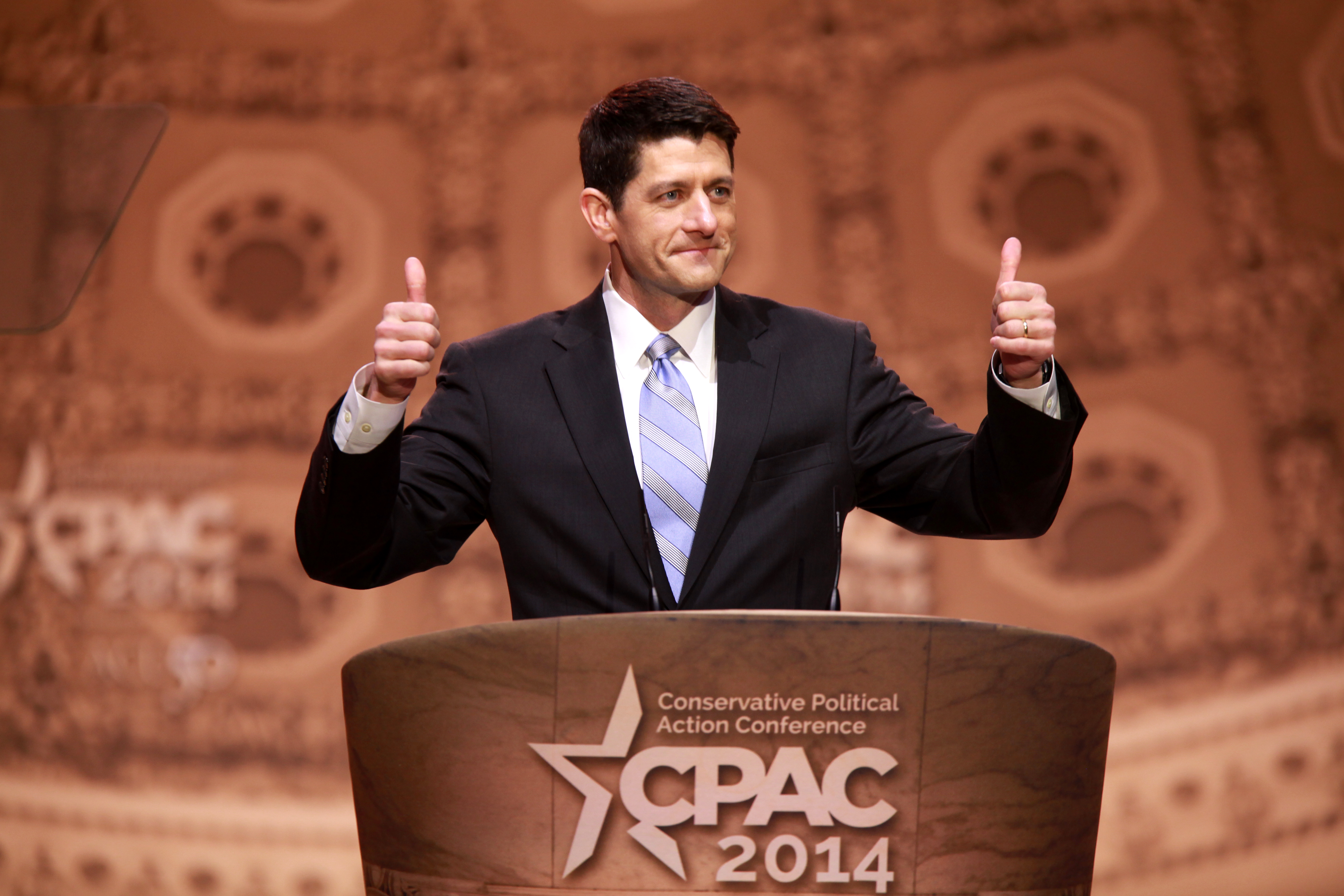
Ryan speaking at the Conservative Political Action Conference (CPAC) in Washington, D.C. in March 2014

Ryan is "proudly, conservatively ideological" and "religiously conservative," according to The New York Times in 2012. In 2009, he was rated the 39th most conservative member of the House. The 2011 National Journal Vote Ratings rated him 68.2 on the conservative scale, being more conservative than 68% of the full House, and he ranked as the 150th most conservative member based on roll-call votes. Ryan has a lifetime American Conservative Union rating of 91/100.

In the 111th Congress, Ryan has sided with a majority of Republicans in 93% of House votes in which he has participated, and has sided with the overall majority vote of all House votes 95% of the time. Ryan chaired the 2016 Republican National Convention. Asked on June 19, 2016, on Meet the Press about his support for Donald Trump, Ryan said "The last thing I want to see happen is another Democrat in the White House." He denied the characterization of his position by interviewer Chuck Todd as "party over country."

== Fiscal policy ==
In 1995, as the top legislative aide for freshman representative Sam Brownback of Kansas, Ryan helped lead the policy team for a group of conservative freshman representatives who called themselves the New Federalists. The New Federalists advocated shrinking the federal government by eliminating federal government departments, spending cuts, and restructuring entitlement spending.

Ryan has an interest in political economics and has been a thought leader in Congress on issues of budget reform. He helped bring the issues of the national debt and the national deficit into the national policy debate. Ryan subscribes to supply-side economics. His positions on fiscal policy have included tax cuts, cuts to entitlement programs, freezes on discretionary spending, the elimination of automatic inflation increases in calculating budget baselines, deregulation, and the privatization of social security, Medicare, Medicaid, and education.

=== Budget proposals and budgetary process reform proposals ===
In his sixth term in 2008, Ryan began introducing budget proposals as a member of the House, distinct from his contributions to budget proposals in his capacity as a member and later ranking member and chair of the House Budget Committee. His budget proposals were embraced by many of the Tea Party movement freshman Representatives elected to Congress in the 2010 midterm elections. Ryan supports a line-item veto.

==== Roadmaps ====
In early 2007, Ryan briefed members of the House Ways and Means Committee on his plans to draft a "Roadmap for America's Future." On May 21, 2008, Ryan introduced H.R. 6110, the Roadmap for America's Future Act of 2008, commonly referred to as the "Ryan budget". This proposed legislation outlined changes to entitlement spending, including a controversial proposal to replace Medicare with a voucher program for those under the age of 55. The Roadmap found only eight sponsors and did not move past committee.

On April 1, 2009, he introduced his alternative to the 2010 United States federal budget. It would have eliminated the American Recovery and Reinvestment Act of 2009 and imposed a five-year spending freeze on all discretionary spending. It would have also phased out Medicare's traditional fee-for-service model; instead it would have offered fixed sums in the form of vouchers for those under the age of 55, with which Medicare beneficiaries could buy private insurance. Ryan's proposed budget would also have allowed taxpayers to opt out of the federal income taxation system with itemized deductions, and instead pay a marginal tax rate 10 percent of adjusted gross income up to $100,000 for couples ($50,000 for singles) and 25 percent on any remaining income. It was ultimately rejected in the Democratic controlled House by a vote of 293–137, with 38 Republicans opposed.

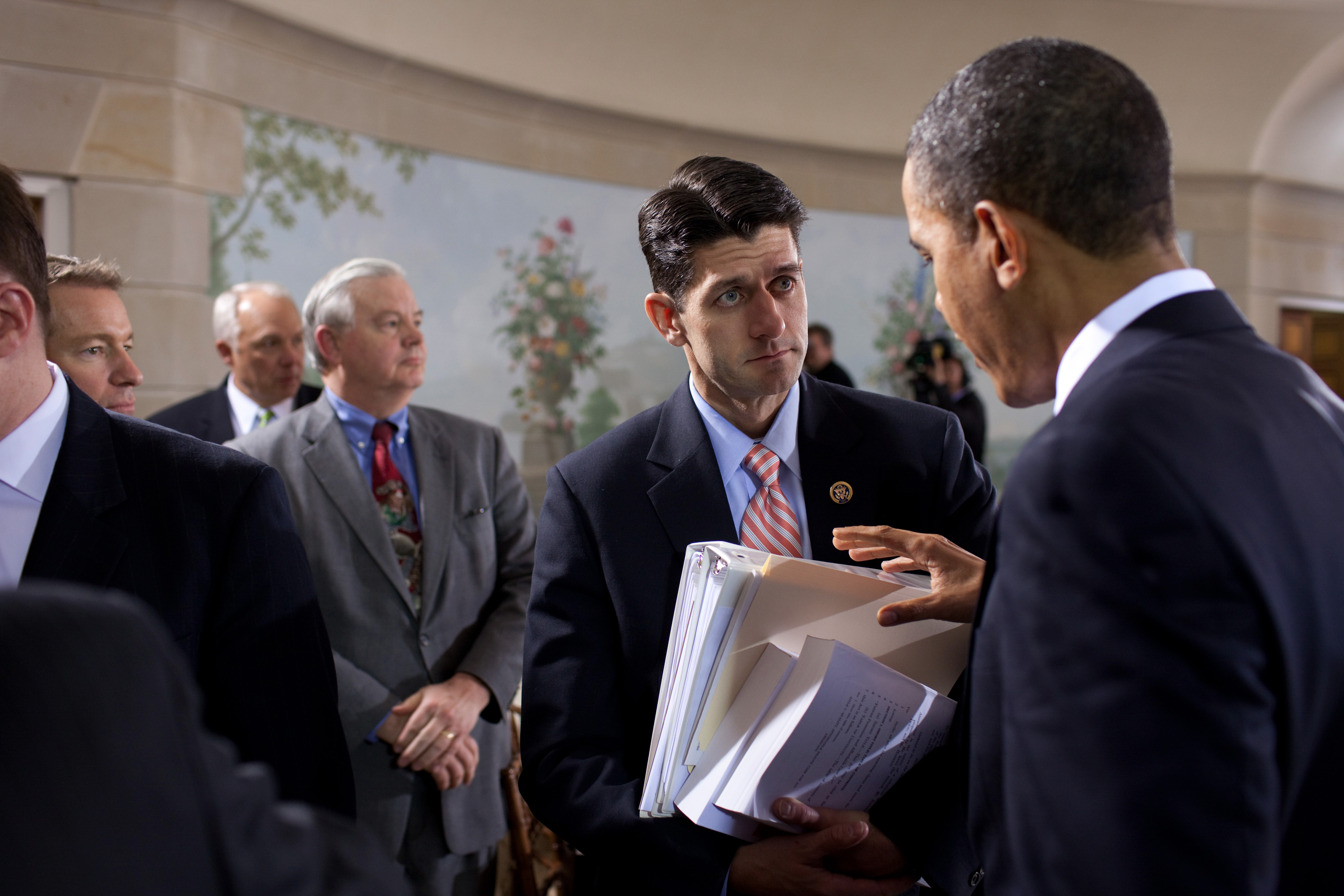
Ryan with President Obama during a bipartisan meeting on health insurance reform, February 25, 2010

On January 27, 2010, the day of President Barack Obama's State of the Union address, Ryan reintroduced a modified version of his Roadmap, H.R. 4529: Roadmap for America's Future Act of 2010. The modified plan would have provided across-the-board tax cuts by reducing income tax rates; eliminating income taxes on capital gains, dividends, and interest; and abolishing the estate tax and Alternative Minimum Tax. The plan would also have replaced the corporate income tax with a border-adjusted business consumption tax of 8.5%. The plan would have privatized a portion of Social Security and reduced benefits for those under 55, eliminated the tax exclusion for employer-sponsored health insurance, and privatized Medicare and Medicaid.

Obama initially viewed Ryan as a Republican who could help cut the federal deficit. In January 2010, at the House Republican annual retreat, Obama called Ryan's budget proposal a "serious proposal" finding both points of agreement and disagreement, saying "some ideas in there ... that I would agree with, but there are some ideas that we should have a healthy debate about because I don't agree with them". Chief Actuary of Medicare Rick Foster compared Ryan's "Roadmap" with the 2010 healthcare reform in congressional hearings, stating that while both had "some potential" to make healthcare prices "more sustainable," he was more "confident" in Ryan's plan. Economist and columnist Paul Krugman criticized Ryan's plan as making overly optimistic assumptions and proposing tax cuts for the wealthy. Krugman also called the plan a "fraud" saying it relied on severe cuts in domestic discretionary spending and "dismantling Medicare as we know it" by suggesting the voucher system, which he noted was similar to a failed attempt at reform in 1995. In contrast, columnist Ramesh Ponnuru, writing in the National Review, argued that Ryan's plan would lead to less debt than current budgets. Economist Ted Gayer wrote that "Ryan's vision of broad-based tax reform, which essentially would shift us toward a consumption tax ... makes a useful contribution to this debate."

The 2010 version of the Roadmap found only 14 cosponsors. On August 31, 2010, the National Republican Congressional Committee requested members not to defend the Roadmap, noting its proposal to privatize social security.

==== Paths to prosperity ====
In the 2010 midterm elections, Ryan advised and endorsed Republican candidates in the primaries and general elections, and his budget proposals were embraced by many of the Tea Party movement-inspired freshman Representatives.

On April 11, 2011, Ryan introduced H.Con.Res. 34, a federal budget for fiscal year 2012, known as "The Path to Prosperity: Restoring America's Promise." The plan included repealing the 2010 Patient Protection and Affordable Care Act (ACA), also known as "Obamacare", the privatization of Medicare by issuing vouchers for private insurance, and block granting Medicaid funding to the states. Income tax rates would be lowered. Increases in defense spending, and decreases in federal funding for Medicaid and for health insurance for children, were proposed.

On April 5, 2011, House Minority Leader Nancy Pelosi tweeted that The Path to Prosperity was "a path to poverty for America's seniors and children". On April 13, 2011, speaking of Ryan's budget proposal, Obama said: "I don't think there's anything courageous about asking for sacrifice from those who can least afford it. There's nothing serious about a plan that claims to reduce the deficit by spending a trillion dollars on tax cuts for millionaires and billionaires." The House passed the Ryan plan on April 15, 2011, by a vote of 235–193. Four Republicans joined all House Democrats in voting against it. On an April 27, 2011, conference call with reporters Senate Majority Leader Harry Reid said that passage of the Ryan plan "would be one of the worst things to happen to this country". On May 25, 2011, the Ryan budget plan was defeated in the Senate.

On March 23, 2012, Ryan introduced a version of his federal budget for the fiscal year 2013, known as "The Path to Prosperity: A Blueprint for American Renewal." It proposed reducing all discretionary spending in the budget from 12.5% of GDP in 2011 to 3.75% of GDP in 2050. On March 29, 2012, the House of Representatives passed the resolution along partisan lines, 228 yeas to 191 nays; ten Republicans voted against the bill, along with all the House Democrats. The bill was defeated in the Democratic-controlled Senate.

An analysis by the CBO showed that the Ryan plan would not balance the budget for at least 28 years, partly because the changes in Medicare would not affect anyone older than 55. Former U.S. Comptroller General David Walker and Maya MacGuineas, president of the Committee for a Responsible Federal Budget, praised the budget for making tough choices. Walker believed it needed to go even further, tackling Social Security and defense spending. In contrast, David Stockman, director of the Office of Management and Budget under President Ronald Reagan, has declared that Ryan's budget "is devoid of credible math or hard policy choices" and would "do nothing to reverse the nation's economic decline and arrest its fiscal collapse". Ezra Klein also criticized the budget for making "unrealistic assumptions". The Center on Budget and Policy Priorities was highly critical of Ryan's budget proposal, stating that it would shift income to the wealthy while increasing poverty and inequality.

Parts of the 2012 Ryan budget were criticized by the United States Conference of Catholic Bishops for its proposed cuts to housing and food stamp programs. Faculty and administrators of Georgetown University challenged what they described as Ryan's misapplication of Catholic social teaching in defending his plan.

Most of the proposed policies in Ryan's agenda were unpopular with the majority of Americans, and Democrats took issue with them in the 2012 election.

==== The 113th Congress (2013) and the fiscal year 2014 budget ====
Ryan supported a group of three budget reform bills that were considered by the House during the 113th United States Congress. He supported H.R. 1874, the Pro-Growth Budgeting Act of 2013, which would have required the Congressional Budget Office to provide a macroeconomic impact analysis for bills that are estimated to have a large budgetary effect. He also supported H.R. 1872, the Budget and Accounting Transparency Act of 2014, which would have modified the budgetary treatment of federal credit programs, including requiring the federal budget to reflect the net impact of programs administered by Fannie Mae and Freddie Mac, such that the debt of those two programs would be included in the national debt. He also supported H.R. 1871, the Baseline Reform Act of 2013, which would have discontinued the practice of automatic increases for inflation in projecting discretionary appropriations in CBO's baseline budgeting. Arguing in favor of H.R. 1871, Ryan said that "families don't get automatic raises every year. Neither should Washington". He said that these three budget reform bills "are an important step toward restoring fiscal discipline in Washington". Ryan claimed that "by improving the budget process, we can get a better handle on our spending problem". The three budget reform bills passed the House and died in the Senate budget committee.

Ryan submitted a new budget plan for Fiscal Year 2014 to the House in March 2013. It claimed to balance the budget by 2023 by repealing Obama's Patient Protection and Affordable Care Act (ACA), also known as "Obamacare", and would have instituted federal vouchers into Medicare, and cut Medicare benefits and spending on education, research, food safety and other domestic programs. This budget, House Concurrent Resolution 25, was voted on by the House on March 21, 2013, and passed 221-207.

Ryan was chairman of the House Budget committee during the 2013 budget sequestration, debt-ceiling crisis, and federal government shutdown. He suggested using discussions about raising the federal debt ceiling as "leverage" to reduce federal spending. In January 2013, he said that sequestration would likely occur because the Democrats offered no alternative. Ryan voted against the Senate compromise continuing resolution that ended the shutdown, which included raising the debt ceiling and funding for the Patient Protection and Affordable Care Act.

On December 10, 2013, Ryan announced that he and Democratic Senator Patty Murray, his counterpart as chairperson of the Senate Budget Committee, had reached a compromise agreement on a two-year, bipartisan budget bill, called the Bipartisan Budget Act of 2013. The deal would cap the federal government's spending for Fiscal Year 2014 at $1.012 trillion and for Fiscal Year 2015 at $1.014. The proposed deal would eliminate some spending cuts required by the sequester. $45 billion of the cuts were scheduled to happen in January 2014, and $18 billion of the cuts scheduled to occur in 2015. The deal offset the spending increases by raising airline fees and changing the pension contribution requirements of new federal workers. Overall the fee increases and spending reductions totalled about $85 billion over a decade. The budget became law.

Ryan said that he was "proud" of the agreement because "it reduces the deficit – without raising taxes". Some conservative Republicans objected to his budget proposal. Republican Raul Labrador criticized the "terrible plan," saying that "it makes promises to the American people that are false. Today the Democrats realized they were right all along, that we would never hold the line on the sequester." Other conservatives were more positive: "It achieves most of the things we would like to see when we have divided government," said Rep. Steve Womack (R-Ark.).

In 2014, Ryan released a refresh of his budget plan which would cut spending by 5.1 trillion over a decade and claimed to balance the budget by 2024. his proposed budget for fiscal year 2015 included deep cuts to domestic spending to reduce projected federal deficits by about $5 trillion over the next decade. In releasing the budget, Ryan stated: "We have to stop spending money we don't have." According to the White House, Ryan's 2014 budget proposal would increase taxes on middle-class families by an average of $2000, while cutting taxes for the richest Americans.

==== Spending ====
Some commentators have criticized Ryan's votes for what they believe were deficit-increasing policies during the George W. Bush administration as being inconsistent with fiscal conservatism. While he voted for the two Bush tax cuts (in 2001 and 2003), he also voted for the 2003 bill that created the Medicare Part D prescription drug benefit, the Troubled Asset Relief Program (TARP), and the $700 billion bank bailout, and Ryan was one of 32 Republicans in the House to vote for the auto industry bailout. In 2011 President Barack Obama criticized Ryan as "not [being] on the level" by describing himself as a fiscal conservative while voting for these policies, as well as two "unpaid for" wars. Columnist Ezra Klein wrote in 2012: "If you know about Paul Ryan at all, you probably know him as a deficit hawk. But, Ryan has voted to increase deficits and expand government spending too many times for that to be his north star."

Ryan have advocated for spending cuts to help finance the Trump tax cuts, while the President Trump's 2018 budget includes $2.1 trillion in spending cuts over ten years to Medicaid, Affordable Care Act subsidies, food stamps, Social Security disability insurance, Supplemental security income, and cash welfare (TANF).

=== Regulation ===
In 1999, Ryan voted in favor of the Gramm–Leach–Bliley Act, which repealed some of the financial regulation of banking from the 1933 Glass–Steagall Act. He sponsored a 2008 bill that would repeal the requirement that the Federal Reserve System work to reduce unemployment. Ryan voted against the Credit CARD Act of 2009 which expanded consumer credit card protection plans. He opposed the Dodd–Frank Wall Street Reform and Consumer Protection Act, which strengthened financial regulation, characterizing it as "class warfare".

== Social, environmental, and science issues ==
Ryan "played a central role in nearly all" the policy debates of the period 2010-2012. Ryan's non-fiscal policy positions were subject to additional national attention with his 2012 race for Vice President.

=== Health care, Social Security, and unemployment insurance ===
Ryan does not believe government subsidized health care is a right or privilege. In 2012, The New York Times said Ryan was "his party's most forceful spokesman for cutting entitlement spending." On March 17, 2017, Ryan said "Medicaid, sending it back to the states, capping its growth rate" was a long-time dream of his. Though he voted for the 2003 Medicare Prescription Drug, Improvement, and Modernization Act that created the Medicare Part D prescription drug benefit, nearly a decade later Ryan said Medicare is on an "unsustainable path".

Ryan voted against the 2010 Patient Protection and Affordable Care Act (ACA), also known as "Obamacare", and voted to repeal it in 2012. The Obama and Ryan health care reform plans capped Medicare spending at 0.5% of gross domestic product; while the ACA established the Independent Payment Advisory Board to control costs, which Ryan characterized as "15 un-elected, unaccountable bureaucrats," Ryan proposed that Congress set reimbursement levels. Ryan supported the American Health Care Act of 2017 (AHCA), the House Republican plan to repeal and replace the ACA; after withdrawing the AHCA on the eve of a scheduled March 24, 2017 House vote, the House passed the AHCA on May 4, 2017.

Ryan's budget plans proposed privatizing Medicare for those under the age of 55, and funding Medicaid and the Supplemental Nutrition Assistance Program through block grants to the states. In 2012 Ryan proposed that Medicaid be converted into block grants, but with the federal government's share of the cost cut by some $800 billion over the next decade. Currently, Medicaid is administered by the states, subject to federal rules concerning eligibility, and the amount paid by the federal government depends on the number of people who qualify. His plan would have undone a Reagan-era reform by which the federal government prohibited the states from requiring that a patient's spouse, as well as the patient, deplete all of his or her assets before Medicaid would cover long-term care. Ryan's budget plan proposed raising the Medicare eligibility age, beginning in 2023, by two months a year, until it reached 67 in 2034. A 2011 analysis, conducted by the Urban Institute, a nonpartisan research group, for the Kaiser Family Foundation, estimated that Ryan's 2011 plan would have resulted in 14 million to 27 million fewer people receiving Medicaid coverage by 2021.

Ryan voted to extend unemployment insurance in 2002, 2008, and 2009, but has since voted against further extensions. In 2004 and 2005, Ryan pushed the Bush administration to propose the privatization of Social Security. His proposal ultimately failed when it did not gain the support of the then-Republican presidential administration. In 2005, Ryan and Senator John Sununu of New Hampshire introduced the Social Security Personal Savings Guarantee and Prosperity Act, also known as the Ryan-Sununu plan. The plan would have allowed employees to direct a portion of their Federal Insurance Contributions Act payroll tax on their wages to a private account which invested in a stock portfolio managed by the Social Security Administration. Versions of the plan were included in Ryan's later budget proposals.

In 2010 Ryan served on the joint, bipartisan National Commission on Fiscal Responsibility and Reform, known as the Simpson-Bowles Commission. He voted with the majority of the Commission not to advance its final report to Congress. Ryan justified his vote claiming that the Commission's recommendations did not do enough to reduce health care costs.

==== Reaction to 2017 AHCA vote ====
Ryan was heavily condemned for his "Yes" vote on the AHCA, and many of his fundraisers were picketed by ACA supporters. A fundraiser organized by Ryan in Oregon and Representatives Greg Walden (R-OR) and Jaime Herrera Beutler (R-WA) faced intense protests and chants denouncing Ryan and Walden, though not Herrera Beutler as she had voted against the AHCA. The New York Times wrote that Ryan's vocal support of the bill dealt major damage to his standing with the public, writing "Mr. Ryan has emerged from the defeat of the health care bill [AHCA] badly damaged, retaining a job but left to confront the realities of his failure — imperiling the odd-couple partnership that was supposed to sustain a new era of conservative government under unified Republican rule." ThinkProgress called Ryan's support of the AHCA "cruel" and accused Ryan of having grudges against low-income Americans, stating "Ryan has spent his career actively making it harder for low-income parents to do just this — asking them to work more so they can move off public programs."

Ryan defended the bill amidst the severe criticism, saying in an interview with George Stephanopoulos that "under this bill, no matter what, you cannot be denied coverage if you have a preexisting condition," though Stephanopoulos pointed out several loopholes in the bill that would effectively allow health insurance corporations to charge higher rates for protection of preexisting conditions. Stephanopoulos also identified the major tax cuts within the AHCA that would remove taxes on high-income Americans that were used to fund the ACA. Ryan further defended the AHCA by indicating the provision of the AHCA that would provide block grants to states to fund Medicaid, stating his view that states are more fit for the management of Medicaid rather than the federal government, "so by giving states the ability to customize their Medicaid population, their program to work for them."

In 2018, actor and comedian Seth Rogen garnered widespread attention following a discussion of an encounter between Rogen and Ryan with Stephen Colbert at a convention about Alzheimer's disease hosted by Mitt Romney. Rogen stated that Ryan's children had asked him for a photo, and he had agreed to take one with them before Ryan appeared and asked him for the same, to which Rogen responded by refusing and openly lambasting Ryan in front of his children, saying "I said, 'No way, man!'", also telling Ryan "Furthermore, I hate what you're doing to the country at this moment and I'm counting the days until you no longer have one iota of the power that you currently have." Rogen stated that he felt "conflicted" about publicly condemning Ryan in front of his children. Rogen and Colbert also discussed the Trump administration family separation policy and the legalization of marijuana in Rogen's home country of Canada. Though Ryan's "Yes" vote on the AHCA was not mentioned in the conversation between Rogen and Colbert, the conversation took place in the backdrop of Ryan's declining popularity which had continued following the vote on the AHCA.

=== Education ===
Ryan voted for the No Child Left Behind Act in 2001. Ryan is a supporter of for-profit colleges and opposed the gainful employment rule, which would have ensured that vocational schools whose students were unable to obtain employment would stop receiving federal aid. Ryan is a supporter of private school vouchers and voted to extend the D.C. Opportunity Scholarship Program in 2011.

In 2012, Rick Hess of the American Enterprise Institute stated that on "education, training, employment, and social services, the Ryan budget would spend 33% less" than Obama's budget plan over the next decade. In particular, the Ryan plan tightened eligibility requirements for Pell Grants and froze the maximum Pell Grant award at the then-current level. According to an analysis by the Education Trust, this would have resulted in more than 1 million students losing Pell Grants over the next 10 years. Additionally, under Ryan's plan, student loans would have begun to accrue interest while students were still in school. Ryan stated that his education policy is to "allocate our limited financial resources effectively and efficiently to improve education". Jordan Weissmann of The Atlantic said that Ryan's vision on education policy is to "cut and privatize". National Education Association President Dennis Van Roekel criticized Ryan's positions on education in 2012 saying: "By selecting Ryan, Romney has doubled down on his view that opportunity is only for those who can afford it or are willing to game the system. He's shown yet again that he is more willing to help the rich get richer than ensuring middle class families get ahead."

In December 2015, Ryan led the bipartisan effort to pass the Every Student Succeeds Act, which, among other things, fully repealed No Child Left Behind and severely limited the federal government's ability to impose and enforce national education standards such as Common Core.

=== Abortion rights and pay equity for women ===
In 1998, Ryan said he opposed all abortions and favored overturning Roe v. Wade; he believes all abortions should be illegal, including those resulting from rape or incest, and only makes an exception for cases where the woman's life is at risk. During Ryan's 1998 campaign for Congress, he "expressed his willingness to let states criminally prosecute women who have abortions," telling the Milwaukee Journal Sentinel that he "would let states decide what criminal penalties would be attached to abortions", and while not stating that he supports jailing women who have an abortion, stated: "if it's illegal, it's illegal". In 2009, he cosponsored the Sanctity of Life Act, which would have extended personhood rights to zygotes. In 2010, Ryan described himself as being "as pro-life as a person gets" and has been described as an "ardent, unwavering foe of abortion rights". As of 2012, Ryan had co-sponsored 38 measures in the U.S. Congress that restrict abortion, according to Bloomberg.

Ryan has also supported legislation that would impose criminal penalties for certain doctors who perform "partial-birth abortions". He voted against federal funding for Planned Parenthood and Title X family planning programs. He also opposed giving over-the-counter status for emergency contraceptive pills. Ryan was one of 227 House co-sponsors of the 2011 No Taxpayer Funding for Abortion Act bill that would have limited funding for federally funded abortions to victims of "forcible rape". "Forcible rape" was not defined in the bill, which critics said would result in excluding date rape, statutory rape, or other situations where the victim had diminished mental capacity. The language was removed from the bill before the House passed it; the Senate did not vote on the bill.

The National Right to Life Committee has consistently given Ryan a "100 percent pro-life voting record" since he took office in 1999. In 2012 NARAL Pro-Choice America said that Ryan had "cast 59 votes" (including procedural motions and amendments which did not have co-sponsors) "on reproductive rights while in Congress and not one has been pro-choice". Ryan has been rated 0% on the Planned Parenthood Action Fund Scorecard.

Ryan voted against the Lilly Ledbetter Fair Pay Act of 2009, which would have bolstered women's rights to bring suit to achieve equal pay for equal work, saying "[W]e've got to champion small businesses." Ryan has voted multiple times against the House version of the Paycheck Fairness Act, which would have helped to address the gender pay gap in the United States.

=== Same-sex marriage ===
Ryan opposes same-sex marriage, had previously supported a constitutional ban on same-sex marriage, opposed the repeal of the don't ask, don't tell policy, voted against same-sex couples adopting children in Washington D.C., and voted against a bill that would expand federal hate crime laws to cover offenses based on a victim's sexual orientation. Unlike most of his fellow Republicans, Ryan voted in favor of the Employment Non-Discrimination Act in 2007, which would have prohibited employment discrimination on the basis of sexual orientation.

The Human Rights Campaign, an LGBT rights organization, has frequently given Ryan a 0/100 rating on its legislative scorecard. During Paul Ryan's 2012 vice presidential bid, he was endorsed by two gay conservative organizations, GOProud and the Log Cabin Republicans. On April 30, 2013, Ryan came out in favor of same-sex couples adopting children. Ryan said he had always supported civil unions, and that if the US Supreme Court declares the Defense of Marriage Act unconstitutional, then he believes it will become a federalist issue for states to decide same-sex marriage.

=== Gun control ===
Ryan has supported the rights of gun owners and opposed stricter gun control measures. He voted against a bill for stronger background check requirements for purchases at gun shows and supports federal concealed-carry reciprocity legislation, which would allow a person with a permit to carry a concealed firearm in one state to carry a firearm in every other state, a top priority for the National Rifle Association of America (NRA). However, in 2017 Ryan was criticised for allowing the Concealed Carry Reciprocity Act to stall in Congress. Ryan is a member of the NRA who owns a rifle and a shotgun, and has received an "A" rating from the NRA's Institute for Legislative Action and has been endorsed by the Institute every cycle he has been in Congress.

=== Immigration ===
In the past, Ryan supported legislation that would have allowed some illegal immigrants to apply for temporary guest-worker status, including one bill that would have provided a pathway to permanent residence status (a Green Card) for such immigrants. However, more recently Ryan "has adopted a firm anti-amnesty, enforcement-first stance" on illegal immigration. He voted against the DREAM Act, a bill that would have provided conditional permanent residency to illegal immigrants who were brought to the United States as children provided they attend college or serve in the military, and met other criteria. He also voted in favor of the Secure Fence Act of 2006. Ryan has said "we must first secure the border and stem the flow of illegal immigration, and then work to increase legal immigration through an enforceable guest worker program" before pursuing a "piecemeal" reform such as the DREAM Act.

=== Environment ===
In 2009 Ryan wrote in an op ed that the hacked e-mails from a server at the Climatic Research Unit at the University of East Anglia, also known as "Climategate", made clear that climatologists "use statistical tricks to distort their findings and intentionally mislead the public on the issue of climate change." He opposes cap and trade and opposed the American Clean Energy and Security Act of 2009. He criticized the Environmental Protection Agency's classification of carbon dioxide as a pollutant.

Ryan is skeptical of the scientific consensus on climate change. On July 30, 2014, at a breakfast hosted by the Christian Science Monitor in Washington, D. C., he said "Climate change occurs no matter what. The question is, can and should the federal government do something about it.(sic) And I would argue the federal government, with all its tax and regulatory schemes, can't." On October 13, 2014, during a debate against Democratic challenger Rob Zerban in Kenosha, Wisconsin both candidates were asked if human activity was to blame for climate change, and Ryan answered: "I don't know the answer to that question. I don't think science does, either."

Ryan supports a 10-year, $40 billion tax break for the petroleum industry, and has proposed cutting funding for renewable energy research and subsidies. As a legislative and policy aide to Rep. Sam Brownback of Kansas, Ryan opposed subsidies for ethanol fuel production.

The League of Conservation Voters (LCV), the Sierra Club, and other environmentalists have criticized Ryan's record on environmental issues, with Ryan earning 3 percent on the LCV 2011 National Environmental Scorecard.

=== Other ===
Ryan opposed the Stop Online Piracy Act, stating that "it creates the precedent and possibility for undue regulation, censorship and legal abuse." Ryan favors a constitutional amendment to ban flag-burning. He also voted to withdraw federal funding of NPR.

== War on Poverty report ==
In February 2013, Ryan began touring low-income neighborhoods and speaking on efforts to reform federal anti-poverty programs.

On March 3, 2014, as Chairman of the Budget Committee of the House of Representatives, Ryan released a report titled The War on Poverty: 50 Years Later, asserting that some of 92 federal programs designed to help lower-income Americans have not provided the relief intended and that there is little evidence that these efforts have been successful. In the report, Ryan advances the argument that federal antipoverty programs suffer from defects that "penalize families for getting ahead" and that "the complex web of federal programs and sudden drop-off in benefits create extraordinarily high effective marginal tax rates," both of which "reduce the incentive to work". At the core of the report are recommendations to enact cuts to welfare, child care, college Pell grants and several other federal assistance programs. In an appendix titled "Measures of Poverty", when the poverty rate is measured by including non-cash assistance from food stamps, housing aid and other federal programs, the report states that these measurements "[have] implications for both conservatives and liberals. For conservatives, this suggests that federal programs have actually decreased poverty. For liberals, it lessens the supposed need to expand existing programs or to create new ones." According to an article in the Fiscal Times, several economists and social scientists whose work had been referenced in the report said that Ryan either misunderstood or misrepresented their research.

Ryan has spoken out against a "tailspin of culture, in our inner cities in particular, of men not working and just generations of men not even thinking about working or learning to value the culture of work." He made the comment during a radio interview with Bill Bennett and initiated it by citing Charles Murray, someone who is famous for propagating claims of black intellectual inferiority compared to other peoples.

== Foreign and military policy ==
In 2001 and 2004 Ryan voted to end the embargo on Cuba, but later reversed his positions, and, since 2007, has voted for maintaining it. In 2008, he told the Milwaukee Journal Sentinel, "If we're going to have free trade with China, why not Cuba?"

In 2009, Ryan termed the Obama administrations' "reset" of relations with Russia as "appeasement".

Daniel Larison of The American Conservative wrote that Ryan "seems to conceive of U.S. power abroad mostly in terms of military strength" and "truly is a product of the era of George W. Bush". Ryan has been described by Larry Sabato as "just a generic Republican on foreign policy".

Ryan is a supporter of Israel.

Ryan supported the Trans-Pacific Partnership (TPP) and supported granting fast track authority to President Obama to negotiate the TPP.

Ryan was a "reliable supporter of the [George W. Bush] administration's foreign policy priorities". Ryan voted for the 2002 Iraq Resolution, authorizing President George W. Bush to use military force in Iraq. Ryan also voted for the Iraq War troop surge of 2007. In May 2012, he voted for H.R. 4310, which increased defense spending by $8 billion, including spending for the War in Afghanistan and for weapon systems. In 2012, Ryan explained his support for defense spending sequestration in the hope that this would open common ground with the Democrats on deficit reduction. His comments led defense industry leaders to pin their final hopes on the chance that Congress would at least allow the Pentagon to direct the coming cuts.

Ryan supports the investigation of Russian interference in the 2016 United States elections by the Federal Bureau of Investigation and the House and Senate Intelligence Committees, but opposes the appointment of an independent commission or a special prosecutor.
