= Benefit financing model =

The Benefit Financing Model (BFM), also known as Unemployment Insurance Benefit Financing Model (UIBFM), is an actuarial forecasting model designed to help analysts project the condition of Unemployment Trust Fund (UTF) a number of years into the future, and quickly assess the financial impact of various economic scenarios and possible law changes. This model was constructed to be highly comprehensive yet flexible enough to adapt to individual state needs. It is considered a useful tool in unemployment insurance (UI) benefit financing and trust fund forecasting.

== Programs ==
The Benefit Financing Model is composed of two programs. Program One, the Projection Program, is based on the methodology of empirical econometric modeling. It uses regressions to derive mathematical relationships between key UI variables, and projects UI benefits, taxable wages, as well as workload variables on quarterly basis twelve years into the future.

Program Two, the Financial Forecast Program, is based on the methodology of simulation modeling. It estimates Unemployment Trust Fund (UTF) income by simulating the workings of the State's taxation system. Combined with the UTF outgo estimated by the Projection Program, the Financial Forecast Program is capable of projecting the dynamic flow of the Unemployment Trust Fund on quarterly basis under different economic and legislative scenarios. Furthermore, the Financial Forecast Program also assesses the adequacy level of the UTF under different scenarios and report solvency measures (such as Reserve Ratio, Average high cost multiple, etc.) on an annual basis. If the trust fund should become insolvent and borrowing from the Federal Government is projected, the Program is able to assess loan interests, any reduced FUTA credits (also known as FUTA credit reduction), and other key loan variables. Lastly, the Projection Program can also be run independently to perform benefit cost estimation as well as workload forecasting.

The Benefit Financing Model does not forecast macroeconomic variables such as unemployment rate, labor force growth rate, or wage growth rate. Users are expected to enter these variables into the model as economic scenarios.

== History ==
The benefit financing model was first developed in 1977 by William M. Mercer Inc. It was initially known as Mercer Model. Since early 1980s the model has been modified, updated and expanded by the Division of Actuarial and Fiscal Services in the Office of Unemployment Insurance of the U.S. Department of Labor. The model is currently maintained by the Division for the free use by any US state with the desire to use this forecasting model.
