= Dynamic scoring =

Dynamic scoring is a forecasting technique for government revenues, expenditures, and budget deficits that incorporates predictions about the behavior of people and organizations based on changes in fiscal policy, usually tax rates. Dynamic scoring depends on models of the behavior of economic agents which predict how they would react once the tax rate or other policy change goes into effect. This means the uncertainty induced in predictions is greater to the degree that the proposed policy is unlike current policy. Unfortunately, any such model depends heavily on judgment, and there is no evidence that it is more effective or accurate.

For example, a dynamic scoring model may include econometric model of a transitional phase as the population adapts to the new policy, rather than the so-called static-scoring alternative of standard assumption about behavior of people being immediately and directly sensitive to prices. The outcome of the dynamic analysis is therefore heavily dependent on assumptions about future behaviors and rates of change. The dynamic analysis is potentially more accurate than the alternative, if the econometric model correctly captures how households and firms will react to a policy changes. This has been attacked as assumption-driven compared to static scoring which makes simpler assumptions about behavior change due to the introduction of a new policy.

== United States national government, 2015–2018 ==
Using dynamic scoring has been promoted by Republican legislators to argue that supply-side tax policy, for example the Bush tax cuts of 2001 and 2011 GOP Path to Prosperity proposal, return higher benefits in terms of GDP growth and revenue increases than are predicted from static scoring. Some economists argue that their dynamic scoring conclusions are overstated, pointing out that Congressional Budget Office (CBO) practices already include some dynamic scoring elements and that to include more may lead to politicization of the department.

On January 6, 2013, the version of the Pro-Growth Budgeting Act of 2013 included in the Budget and Accounting Transparency Act of 2014 passed the United States House of Representatives as part of their Rules adopted in House Resolution 5, passed with the exclusive support of the Republican Party (United States) by a vote of 234–172. The same rules package for the year had other controversial provisions funded. The bill would require the Congressional Budget Office to use dynamic scoring to provide a macroeconomic impact analysis for bills that are estimated to have a large budgetary effect. The text of the provision read:

(a) An estimate provided by the Congressional Budget Office under section 402 of the Congressional Budget Act of 1974 for any major legislation shall, to the extent practicable, incorporate the budgetary effects of changes in economic output, employment, capital stock, and other macroeconomic variables resulting from such legislation.

(b) An estimate provided by the Joint Committee on Taxation to the Director of the Congressional Budget Office under section 201(f) of the Congressional Budget Act of 1974 for any major legislation shall, to the extent practicable, incorporate the budgetary effects of changes in economic output, employment, capital stock, and other macroeconomic variables resulting from such legislation.

(c) An estimate referred to in this clause shall, to the extent practicable, include--

(1) a qualitative assessment of the budgetary effects (including macroeconomic variables described in paragraphs (a) and (b)) of such legislation in the 20-fiscal year period beginning after the last fiscal year of the most recently agreed to concurrent resolution on the budget that set forth appropriate levels required by section 301 of the Congressional Budget Act of 1974; and

(2) an identification of the critical assumptions and the source of data underlying that estimate.

(d) As used in this clause--

(1) the term `major legislation' means any bill or joint resolution--

(A) for which an estimate is required to be prepared pursuant to section 402 of the Congressional Budget Act of 1974 and that causes a gross budgetary effect (before incorporating macroeconomic effects) in any fiscal year over the years of the most recently agreed to concurrent resolution on the budget equal to or greater than 0.25 percent of the current projected gross domestic product of the United States for that fiscal year; or

(B) designated as such by the chair of the Committee on the Budget for all direct spending legislation other than revenue legislation or the Member who is chair or vice chair, as applicable, of the Joint Committee on Taxation for revenue legislation; and

(2) the term `budgetary effects' means changes in revenues, outlays, and deficits.

These provisions were removed in January 2019 for the 116th Congress by H. Res. 6 section 102(u).

== Kansas ==
The Kansas state government cut personal income taxes to stimulate economic growth, depending on optimistic assumptions from dynamic scoring for state revenue. Authors of the plan claimed that "cutting taxes can have a near immediate and permanent impact," arguing for tax cuts over rebuilding roads or improving the quality of schools. In addition, the tax on "pass-through" businesses was eliminated. After continual revenue deficits, the largest sales tax increase in Kansas history, downgrades from Moody's and Standard & Poor's and economic performance that lagged neighboring states, the election of 2016 was a referendum on tax policy and the legislature increased income taxes over the governor's veto Kansas's "rainy day" fund reported levels $570 million lower than before the tax cut, even though Kansas had directed more tax revenue to it.

== See also ==
- Laffer curve
