= AHCM =

AHCM may refer to:

- Apical hypertrophic cardiomyopathy, a variant of hypertrophic cardiomyopathy
- Average high cost multiple, an actuarial measurement used in unemployment insurance
