= Louie Gohmert =

American politician (born 1953)

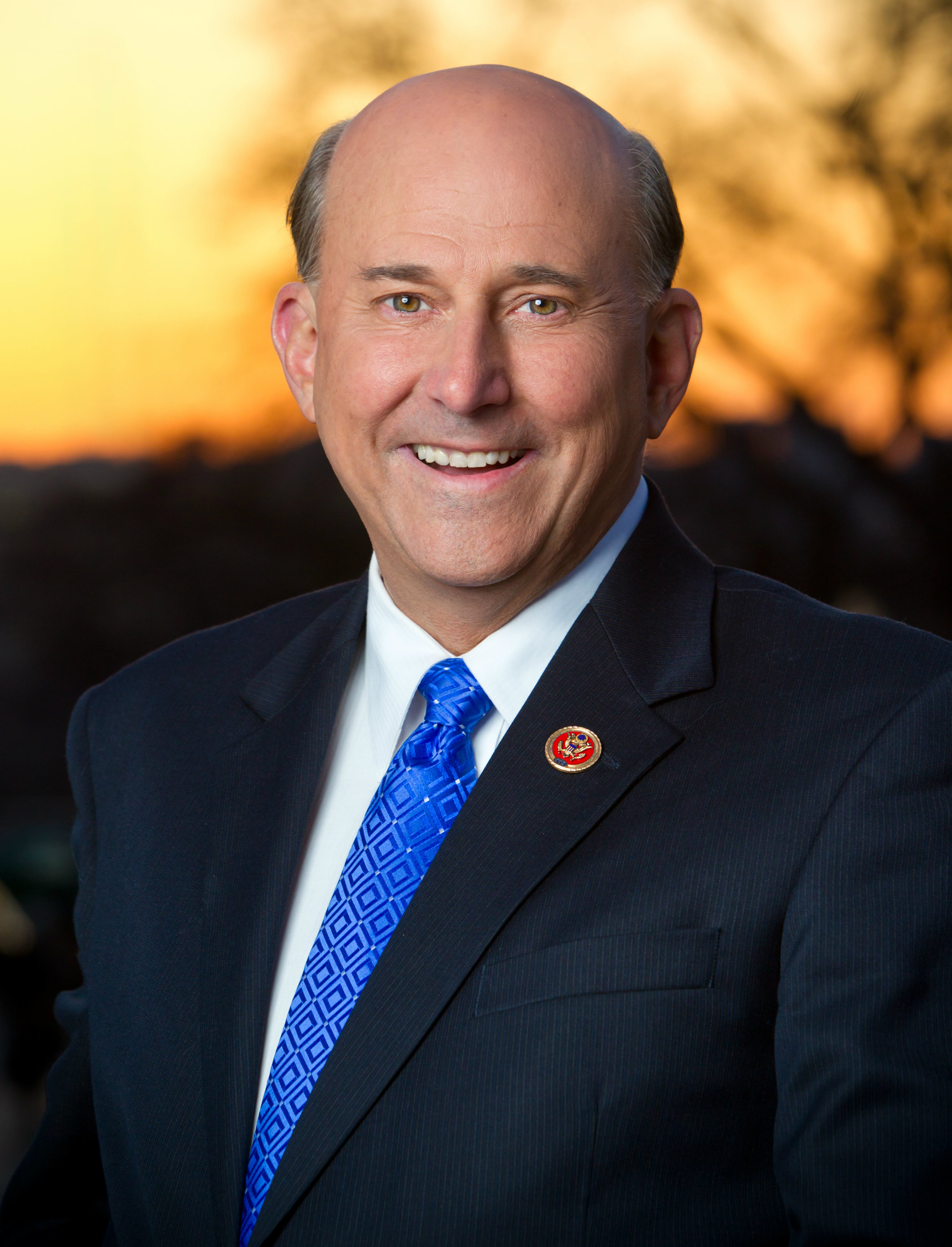
- Official portrait, 2013

Member of the U.S. House of Representatives from Texas's 1st district
- In office January 3, 2005 – January 3, 2023
- Preceded by: Max Sandlin
- Succeeded by: Nathaniel Moran

Personal details
- Born: Louis Buller Gohmert Jr. August 18, 1953 (age 73) Pittsburg, Texas, U.S.
- Party: Republican
- Spouse: Kathy Gohmert (m. 1978)
- Children: 3
- Education: Texas A&M University (BA); Baylor University (JD)

Military service
- Branch/service: United States Army
- Years of service: 1978–1982
- Rank: Captain
- Unit: Army Judge Advocate General's Corps
- Awards: Meritorious Service Medal
- Gohmert's voice Gohmert on the 40th anniversary of the release of fellow Rep. Sam Johnson as a Vietnam POW. Recorded February 25, 2013

Louis Buller Gohmert Jr. (/ˈɡoʊmərt/; born August 18, 1953) is an American attorney, politician, and former judge who was the U.S. representative from Texas's 1st congressional district from 2005 to 2023. Gohmert is a Republican and was part of the Tea Party movement. In January 2015, he unsuccessfully challenged John Boehner for Speaker of the House of Representatives. In November 2021, he announced his candidacy in the 2022 Texas Attorney General election. He failed to advance to the Republican primary runoff, finishing fourth with 17% of the vote.

== Early life and education ==
Gohmert was born in Pittsburg, Texas, the son of German Texan architect Louis Buller Gohmert and his first wife Erma Sue (née Brooks). He was raised in Mount Pleasant, Texas, where he graduated from Mount Pleasant High School in 1971.

Gohmert enrolled in Texas A&M University, receiving a U.S. Army scholarship and earning a B.A. in history in 1975. He commanded a cadet brigade in the Corps of Cadets and served as class president. He was also a student leader for the MSC Student Conference on National Affairs alongside future U.S. Representative Chet Edwards, and a member of the Ross Volunteer Company.

Gohmert received a Juris Doctor degree from Baylor Law School in 1977.

== Early political career ==
Gohmert attended The JAG School at the University of Virginia and entered U.S. Army JAG Corps. He served in the JAG Corps at Fort Benning, Georgia, from 1978 to 1982. Most of his legal service in the U.S. Army was as a defense attorney.

Gohmert was elected as a state district judge for Texas's 7th Judicial District, serving Smith County (Tyler, Texas) from 1992 to 2002. He was elected to three terms. He first saw national recognition for a 1996 probation requirement where he ordered an HIV-positive man, who was convicted on motor vehicle theft charges, to seek the written consent from all future sexual partners on a court-provided form notifying them of his HIV status. The order angered LGBT activists and civil libertarians.

In 2002, Texas Governor Rick Perry appointed Gohmert to fill a vacancy as Chief Justice on Texas's 12th Court of Appeals, where he served a six-month term that ended in 2003.

== U.S. House of Representatives ==
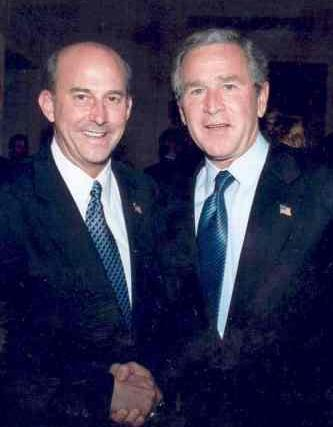
Gohmert with President George W. Bush in 2005

A mid-decade redistricting made the 1st District significantly more conservative than its predecessor. Tyler, which had long anchored the 4th District, was shifted to the 1st District. In the 2004 Republican primary, Gohmert defeated State Representative Wayne Christian of Center, Texas. He defeated Democratic incumbent 1st District Congressman Max Sandlin with 61% of the vote. He has never again faced another contest that close, and been reelected seven times, never with less than 68% of the vote. He only faced an independent in 2008, and a Libertarian in 2010.

On July 29, 2009, Gohmert signed on as a co-sponsor of the defeated H.R. 1503. This bill would have amended "the Federal Election Campaign Act of 1971 to require the principal campaign committee of a candidate for election to the office of president to include with the committee's statement of organization a copy of the candidate's birth certificate, together with such other documentation as may be necessary to establish that the candidate meets the qualifications for eligibility to the office of president under the Constitution".

On January 3, 2013, Gohmert broke ranks with the House leadership to nominate Representative Allen West for Speaker of the House, although West narrowly lost his bid for reelection in 2012 and was no longer a member of Congress.

Although Gohmert had previously ruled out the possibility of a bid for the U.S. Senate, in 2013 he was boosted by at least one "tea party" group (Grassroots America We the People) as a primary challenger to Senator John Cornyn.

A vocal critic of Speaker John Boehner, Gohmert challenged his reelection to the speakership for the 114th Congress when Congress convened on January 6, 2015. Boehner was reelected, even though 25 Freedom Caucus Republicans chose not to vote for him. Gohmert received three of those votes.

In 2017, Gohmert expressed fear that he might become the target of gun violence similar to that experienced by former representative Gabby Giffords and refused to hold public town hall meetings.

Also in 2017, Gohmert introduced legislation to simplify the 911 system, which was signed into law.

=== Reputation ===
Gohmert is considered to be a conservative Tea Party Republican.

During his congressional career, Gohmert's actions and comments garnered much controversy, including when he compared homosexuality to bestiality, compared U.S. President Barack Obama to Adolf Hitler, said Hillary Clinton was "mentally challenged," speculated mask wearing caused his contraction of COVID-19, grieved over the arrest of January 6 rioters, and said cancelling a television show with homophobic comments was comparable to Nazism. Eric Neugeboren of The Texas Tribune described Gohmert as "something of an outlier in Congress for the ease with which he was willing to make unfounded and offensive pronouncements" and that he "was a precursor to former President Donald Trump's brand of populist, establishment-bucking conservatism that delights in offending progressives and makes no apologies for spreading misinformation." According to The Daily Sentinel, while Gohmert was seen nationally as "unhinged," he remained very popular with his constituents.

In May 2021, Gohmert made a rambling speech in which he admitted that many people think he is "the dumbest guy in Congress;" though, he added "I'm comfortable with who and what I am." The speech resulted in mockery of Gohmert by some in the media.

=== Fiscal policy ===
Gohmert signed the Americans for Tax Reform's Taxpayer Protection Pledge. He offered an alternative plan to kick-start the economy with his tax holiday bill, which would allow taxpayers to be exempt for two months from having federal income tax taken out of their paychecks.

He was one of a number of Republicans who voted against the Budget Control Act of 2011 on grounds it did not do enough to deal with the government's growing debt.

Gohmert was one of four Republicans who joined 161 Democrats to vote against a balanced budget Constitutional amendment in November 2011.

Gohmert supports and has voted for legislation in favor of school vouchers.

Gohmert strongly supported the Baseline Reform Act of 2013 (H.R. 1871; 113th Congress), a bill that would change the way in which discretionary appropriations for individual accounts are projected in the Congressional Budget Office's baseline. Under H.R. 1871, projections of such spending would still be based on the current year's appropriations, but would not be adjusted for inflation. Gohmert said, "conservatives have advocated for years that there should be no automatic spending increases in any federal department's budget ... that has been a trap so when we simply slow the rate of increase, we are accused of making draconian cuts." He argued the legislation would make clearer "what is an increase and what is a cut", put the government in the same situation as American families, and help with the task of getting the debt under control.

=== Climate change and the environment ===
Gohmert rejects the scientific consensus on climate change and has asserted that data supporting it is fraudulent. He opposes cap-and-trade legislation, such as the one that passed the U.S. House when it had a Democratic majority, and supports expanding drilling and exploration in Arctic National Wildlife Refuge (ANWR).

In a July 8, 2015, interview on the C-SPAN program Washington Journal, after Pope Francis issued his second encyclical Laudato si', Gohmert said Francis was incorrect to identify climate change as a serious problem. He supported the U.S. withdrawal from the Paris Agreement.

In a 2012 meeting of the House Natural Resources Committee, Gohmert stated his strong support of a trans-Alaskan pipeline as a means for caribou to have more sex. According to Gohmert, "When [the caribou] want to go on a date, they invite each other to head over to the pipeline. So [my] real concern now [is] ... if oil stops running through the pipeline ... do we need a study to see how adversely the caribou would be affected if that warm oil ever quit flowing?" Gohmert's comments were not favorably received by the rest of the committee.

During a June 2021 House Natural Resources Committee hearing, Gohmert asked, "is there anything that the National Forest Service or BLM (Bureau of Land Management) can do to change the course of the moon's orbit or the Earth's orbit around the sun?" to mitigate climate change. Though some assumed he was being ironic, after receiving laughter and scorn for his comments online, Gohmert mistakenly believed that the scorn directed at him was due to the acronym "BLM" (as if people were confusing it with Black Lives Matter), and replied, "Exceedingly devious how you hid the context with an ellipses [sic] in your tweet. The hearing was about the BUREAU OF LAND MANAGEMENT & climate change. BLM stands for the BUREAU OF LAND MANAGEMENT", failing to realize people were laughing at him for asking his question seriously. Scientific American pointed out the practical and theoretical problems involved in Gohmert's proposal.

=== Abortion ===
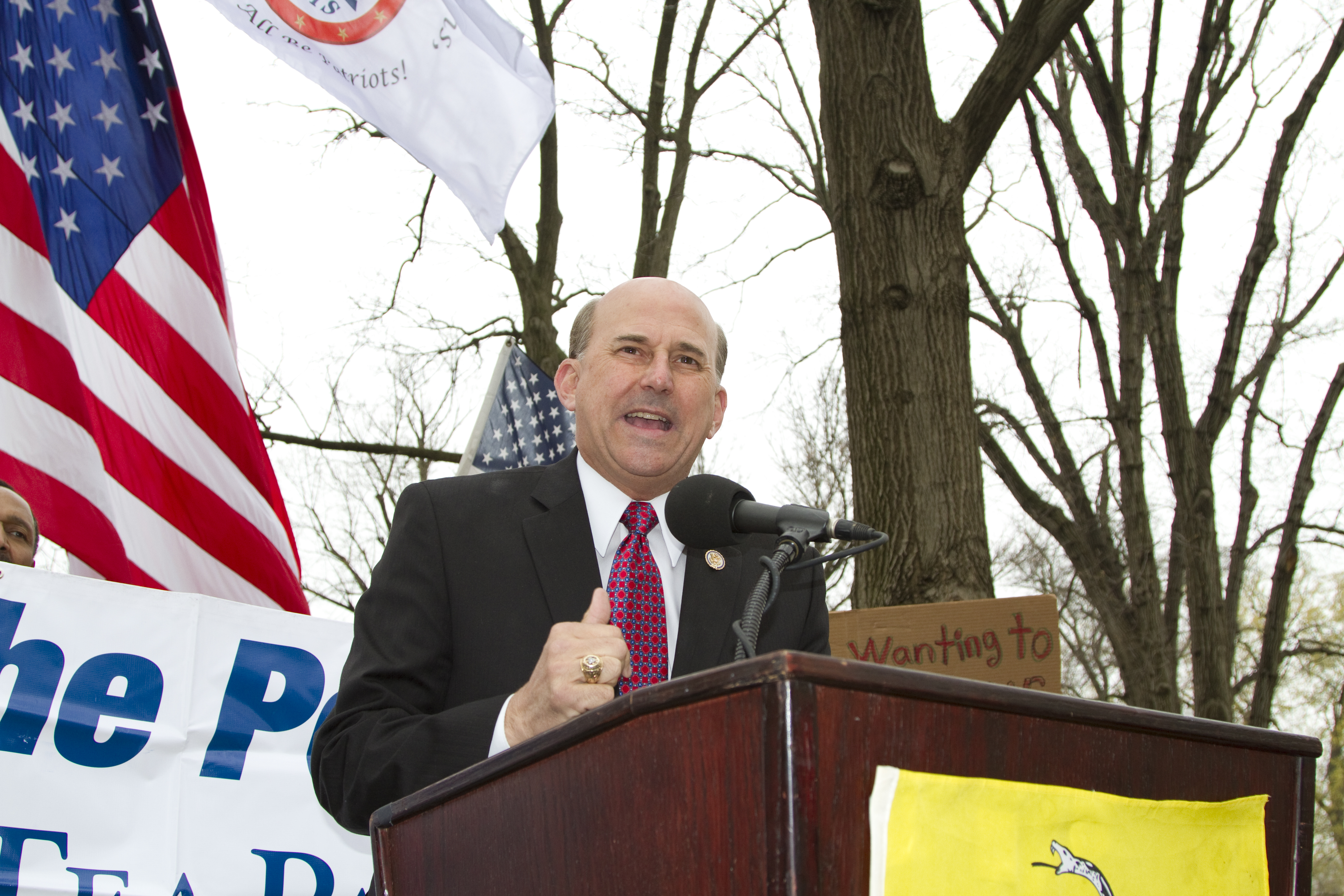
Gohmert speaking at a rally in 2011

Gohmert opposes abortion. He has said that he believes that life begins at conception. Gohmert sponsored the Sanctity of Human Life Act and voted for the Child Interstate Abortion Notification Act, a bill that prohibits the transportation of a minor across state lines for the purposes of an abortion without their parents' consent. He has a 100% pro-life voting record rating from the National Right to Life Committee (NRLC).

At a congressional hearing on May 23, 2013, on an abortion bill that would ban the procedure after 20 weeks of pregnancy, Gohmert told the story of a couple he knew who decided to go through with their pregnancy despite learning of fetal anomalies. He told Zink, a witness, that she should have gone through with her pregnancy despite a doctor's opinion that the brain function was impaired, and then have a better assessment of the baby's health once it was born. Gohmert said, "Ms. Zink, having my great sympathy and empathy both, I still come back wondering, shouldn't we wait, like that couple did, and see if the child can survive before we decide to rip him apart? ... So these are ethical issues, they're moral issues, they're difficult issues, and the parents should certainly be consulted. But it just seems like it's a more educated decision if the child is in front of you to make those decisions".

=== LGBT rights ===
Gohmert opposes LGBT rights. In 2009, he voted against the Matthew Shepard and James Byrd Jr. Hate Crimes Prevention Act, a bill that expanded federal hate crime law to cover crimes biased by the victim's sexual orientation or gender identity. In 2010, Gohmert opposed allowing gays and lesbians to serve in the U.S. military and voted against the Don't Ask, Don't Tell Repeal Act. In 2015, Gohmert cosponsored a resolution to amend the US constitution to ban same-sex marriage. Gohmert also cosponsored a resolution disagreeing with the Supreme Court ruling in Obergefell v. Hodges, which held that same-sex marriage bans are unconstitutional. In 2019, he expressed strong opposition to the Equality Act, a bill that would protect LGBT people against discrimination.

=== School shootings ===
On December 16, 2012, two days after the Sandy Hook shootings, Gohmert appeared on Fox News Sunday and suggested that the tragedy would have never happened had the teachers been armed. He told host Chris Wallace: "I wish to God that she [principal Dawn L. Hochsprung] had an M4 in her office, locked up so when she heard gunfire, she pulls it out... and takes him out and takes his head off before he can kill those precious kids." He claimed that the 20 victims who had been killed with a Bushmaster semi-automatic rifle had "defensive wounds".

After the 2022 Uvalde school massacre, Gohmert said, "Maybe if we heard more prayers from leaders of this country instead of taking God's name in vain, we wouldn't have the mass killings like we didn't have before prayer was eliminated from schools."

=== Scientific research funding ===
On March 22, 2016, Gohmert was one of four representatives to vote against H.R. 4742 (383 voted for it), a bill to authorize the National Science Foundation to support entrepreneurial programs for women. He said the following in defense of his position: he acknowledged the bill was "well-intentioned" but said "this program is designed to discriminate against that young, poverty-stricken boy and to encourage the girl. Forget the boy. Encourage the girl."

=== Hate crimes ===
On February 26, 2020, Gohmert voted against making lynching a federal hate crime. He said the 10-year sentence for lynching in the act was "ridiculous" and that crimes such as lynching should be prosecuted through state murder statutes, which is punishable up to death in Texas. Gohmert opposes federal hate crime legislation, saying that some hate crime legislation is unnecessary because assault and murder are already crimes.

=== Foreign policy and national security ===
On May 15, 2013, Gohmert said in a House Judiciary Hearing that he believed the Federal Bureau of Investigation (FBI) did not act with due diligence concerning alleged bomber Tamerlan Tsarnaev. His contention was that the FBI was more interested in Christian groups such as those led by Billy and Franklin Graham than in groups that might be considered less politically correct to target. Attorney General Eric Holder responded to his claims: "The only observation I was going to make is that you state as a matter of fact what the FBI did and did not do. Unless somebody has done something inappropriate, you don't have access to the FBI files ... I know what the FBI did. You cannot know what I know. That's all". Gohmert objected to this on the grounds that Holder had "challenge[d]" his character and made several unsuccessful attempts to inject his viewpoint as a point of personal privilege.

In April 2018, Gohmert testified at a hearing supporting Derrick Miller, a former US Army National Guardsman Sergeant who was sentenced to life in prison with the chance of parole for the premeditated murder of an Afghan civilian during a battlefield interrogation.

In September 2021, Gohmert was among 75 House Republicans to vote against the National Defense Authorization Act of 2022, which contains a provision that would require women to be drafted.

Gohmert was among 19 House Republicans to vote against the final passage of the 2022 National Defense Authorization Act.

In June 2021, Gohmert was one of 49 House Republicans to vote to repeal the AUMF against Iraq.

==== "Terror babies" ====
In a speech about national security on the House floor in June 2010, Gohmert claimed that a retired FBI agent had told him that one of the things the FBI had been looking at were terrorist cells overseas sending young women to become pregnant so they would deliver the baby in the United States, and then take the baby with them back to be raised as a terrorist. When adult, this operative—a U.S. citizen by birth—could be easily infiltrated in the U.S. to carry out terrorist actions. On August 12, 2010, Gohmert appeared on Anderson Cooper 360° to defend comments he had recently made on the House floor about "terror babies".

On Fox Business, Gohmert later claimed that an airline passenger with a relative in Hamas had a grandchild who was to be intentionally born in the United States. In the interview, he said that pregnant women from the Middle East were traveling to the U.S. on tourist visas, planning to deliver children there.

The Fourteenth Amendment to the United States Constitution states that children born on U.S. soil are U.S. citizens at birth. Gohmert asserted that the children would then be returned to the mothers' home countries and undergo terrorist training. When repeatedly asked by the host for evidence of this, Gohmert did not provide substantiation for either the ex-FBI agent story or the airline passenger story, but he did refer to a Washington Post article that said Chinese tourists sometimes travel to the U.S. to give birth in the U.S. Gohmert said this practice takes advantage of a "gaping hole in the security of our country".

==== Muslim Brotherhood ====
On June 13, 2012, Gohmert was one of five Republican United States representatives (with Michele Bachmann, Trent Franks, Tom Rooney, and Lynn Westmoreland) to send letters to the Inspectors General of the Office of the Director of National Intelligence, the Department of Defense, the Department of Homeland Security, the Department of Justice and the Department of State outlining their "serious national security concerns" and asking for "answers to questions regarding the Muslim Brotherhood and other radical groups' access to top Obama administration officials." In the letter, the lawmakers wrote about information they claimed "raises serious questions about Department of State policies and activities that appear to be a result of influence operations conducted by individuals and organizations associated with the Muslim Brotherhood."

A letter to Ambassador Harold W. Geisel, the Deputy Inspector General of the United States Department of State, mentioned the Deputy Chief of Staff to Secretary of State Hillary Clinton, Huma Abedin, as an example of the undue influence. The letter said that Abedin, wife of former U.S. representative Anthony Weiner, who had access to sensitive national security and policy information, "has three family members—her late father, her mother and her brother—connected to Muslim Brotherhood operatives and/or organizations", as backed up by a study by the Center for Security Policy.

The letter and the Center for Security Policy's accusation were widely denounced as a smear, and achieved "near-universal condemnation", including from several prominent Republicans such as John McCain, John Boehner, Scott Brown, and Marco Rubio.

Newt Gingrich praised Gohmert and his colleagues as the "National Security Five" in a Politico editorial. Gingrich wrote that he favored investigating the Muslim Brotherhood, and made clear his support for Gohmert and the other four representatives for raising concerns that improve national security. Conservative columnist Cal Thomas replied, to accusations of "McCarthyism", that the real possibility of infiltration by Islamic extremists deserves to be investigated.

=== Immigration ===
In November 2007, Gohmert introduced private relief bill, H.R. 4070, which stalled the deportation of Rrustem Neza, an Albanian restaurateur from Gohmert's district who had fled to the United States in January 2001 after his brother witnessed the murder of Azem Hajdari a leading member of the Democratic Party of Albania.

Gohmert voted against Consolidated Appropriations Act (H.R. 1158) which effectively prohibits ICE from cooperating with Health and Human Services to detain or remove illegal alien sponsors of unaccompanied alien children (UACs).

In early 2018, Gohmert announced that he had introduced a resolution (H. Res. 791) to change the name of Cesar Chavez Day to Border Control Day, saying, "Chavez spent his life addressing the harmful effects that illegal migration might have on this country and advocating for a legal immigration process." The proposition was criticized by Arizona House Minority Leader Rebecca Rios and members of the Hispanic-American community, who felt it was disrespectful of Chavez's legacy.

In December 2018, with the possibility of a government shutdown looming, the House passed a bill funding the government through February and providing $5.7 billion for the border wall between the United States and Mexico favored by President Trump hours after he told House Republican leaders that he would not sign a package passed in the Senate because it did not provide money for the barrier. After the shutdown commenced, Griff Jenkins asked Gohmert how long Trump should keep the government closed. Gohmert said that only a fourth of the government was shut down as Congress had already approved other portions of the funding through September 2019 and answered that Trump should keep it closed "till hell freezes over" as Congress owed Americans border security. He added that the most compassionate thing the US could do for Mexico and Central America was to not give either country "money that ends up in the hands of drug cartels." In a later statement, Gohmert said, "It is simply outrageous that people who live behind walls, gated communities, have armed body guards and lead the Democrat Party, like millionaire Speaker Pelosi, would deny the American public the simple right to be safe from dangerous criminal elements included in the groups pouring illegally into our country."

Gohmert voted against the Fairness for High-Skilled Immigrants Act of 2019 which would amend the Immigration and Nationality Act to eliminate the per-country numerical limitation for employment-based immigrants, to increase the per-country numerical limitation for family-sponsored immigrants, and for other purposes.

Gohmert voted against the Further Consolidated Appropriations Act of 2020 which authorizes DHS to nearly double the available H-2B visas for the remainder of FY 2020.

=== Comments on George Soros ===
In December 2018, Gohmert was a guest on Varney & Co., on Fox Business discussing Google's work in China, when he digressed to say that it reminded him that "George Soros is supposed to be Jewish, but you wouldn't know it from the damage he's inflicted on Israel, and the fact that he turned on fellow Jews and helped take the property that they owned. This same kind of thing—Google coming from a free country and helping oppress." The allegation was criticized by NBC News for allegedly denigrating Soros's surviving the Holocaust.

Within an hour, host Stuart Varney said on air, "In the last hour, one of our guests, Congressman Louie Gohmert, for some reason went out of his way to bring up George Soros, and made unsubstantiated and false allegations against him. I want to make clear those views are not shared by me, this program or anyone at Fox Business." Gohmert later responded that his words had not been anti-Jewish and were actually a "pro-Jewish statement on my part."

=== Investigations into Donald Trump ===
==== Call for Robert Mueller to resign ====
Gohmert was one of three Republicans who called for the resignation of Robert Mueller, the prosecutor investigating Russian interference in the 2016 presidential election, on the grounds that they believed Mueller could not conduct his investigation fairly "because of his relationship with James Comey, his successor at the bureau". As of March 2016, "[s]ix people connected to President Trump have been charged by the special counsel with an array of crimes, including financial fraud and lying to Congress and investigators. Five have been convicted or pleaded guilty. Twenty-eight others, including 26 Russians, also face charges." Mueller did not exonerate Trump on the issue of obstruction, a fact he reiterated during the House Judiciary Committee hearing. In a June 2019 interview with Politico, Gohmert called Mueller an "anal opening."

==== Whistleblower outing ====
In an open impeachment hearing of the U.S. House of Representatives Judiciary Committee, Gohmert spoke the name of a man widely thought to be the whistleblower whose complaint sparked the first impeachment of Donald Trump.

=== COVID-19 ===
Although there is evidence of its ineffectiveness, Gohmert strongly supports the use of hydroxychloroquine to treat COVID-19, as he told Sean Hannity of Fox News in July 2020. He urged the Food and Drug Administration in April 2020 to approve the drug as an official treatment. In April 2020, Gohmert was criticized after falsely claiming that Germany had invented a "mist" that killed the coronavirus.

Gohmert tested positive for COVID-19 on July 29, 2020, a day after he attended a House Judiciary Committee hearing without wearing a mask, a practice he had largely maintained for some time. In an interview, he suggested that he might have contracted the disease from wearing a mask. An anonymous Gohmert aide emailed Politico with complaints, thanking Politico for letting the office know Gohmert tested positive; that "Louie requires full staff to be in the office, including three interns, so that 'we could be an example to America on how to open up safely'"; and that "people were often berated for wearing a mask". Gohmert said he planned to take hydroxychloroquine as part of his treatment. On September 19, he was reported to be "glad to be on the other side" and to have donated his blood plasma (presumably for use in convalescent plasma therapy).

=== 2020 election and Capitol attack ===
In December 2020, Gohmert was one of 126 Republican members of the House of Representatives to sign an amicus brief in support of Texas v. Pennsylvania, a lawsuit filed at the United States Supreme Court contesting the results of the 2020 presidential election, in which Joe Biden defeated Donald Trump. The Supreme Court declined to hear the case on the basis that Texas lacked standing under Article III of the Constitution to challenge the results of an election held by another state.

==== Gohmert v. Pence ====
On December 27, 2020, Gohmert filed a federal lawsuit against Vice President Mike Pence in the United States District Court for the Eastern District of Texas, authored by attorney Lawrence J. Joseph, in an attempt to overturn the 2020 United States presidential election. Gohmert's lawsuit alleged that the Electoral Count Act of 1887 was unconstitutional, seeking to grant the Vice President the power to reject state-certified presidential electors in favor of "competing slates of electors". Gohmert was joined in his lawsuit by 11 Arizona Republicans who would have become presidential electors had Trump actually won Arizona. The United States Department of Justice represented Pence in the case and argued for its dismissal.

On January 1, 2021, Gohmert's lawsuit was dismissed by federal judge Jeremy Kernodle, a Trump appointee in the United States District Court for the Eastern District of Texas, because the plaintiffs lacked standing. Kernodle ruled that Gohmert lacked standing due to precedent set by the Supreme Court in 1997: alleging an "institutional injury to the House of Representatives" does not grant Gohmert standing to sue. Additionally, Kernodle ruled that the injury Gohmert was alleging depended on so many hypothetical and not yet realized events that it was "far too uncertain to support standing". Gohmert failed to make a case for how he was injured "as an individual", Kernodle said. As for the other plaintiffs, Kernodle ruled that they lacked standing because the injury they alleged was "not fairly traceable" to Pence.

Gohmert appealed the district court's ruling that day. He also reacted to the dismissal by declaring that with "no remedy" provided, "in effect the ruling would be that you gotta go to the streets and be as violent as antifa and BLM."

On January 2, a three-judge panel on the United States Court of Appeals for the Fifth Circuit speedily and tersely rejected Gohmert's appeal; they "affirm the judgment" of the district court, "essentially for the reasons stated by the district court". The judges who presided over the appeal were Andrew Oldham (appointed by Trump), Patrick Higginbotham and Jerry Edwin Smith (both appointed by Ronald Reagan).

Gohmert then appealed to the Supreme Court; the Court rejected the petition on January 7.

==== January 6 Capitol attack ====
According to a U.S. Capitol Police intelligence assessment, during a Newsmax interview on January 1, 2021, "Gohmert claimed that letting the will of the voters stand would 'mean the end of our republic, the end of the experiment in self-government'" and "then seemed to encourage violence as a means to this end." The assessment quoted Gohmert saying, in part, "you gotta go to the streets and be as violent as antifa and BLM." Gohmert denied he had advocated violence.

Gohmert was one of the 147 members of Congress to vote against certifying the results of the 2020 Electoral College in Congress on January 7, 2021, the day after the Capitol attack.

Cassidy Hutchinson, a former aide to White House Chief of Staff Mark Meadows in the Trump administration, testified to the United States House Select Committee on the January 6 Attack that Gohmert, as well as other lawmakers, requested a pardon from President Trump after the Capitol attack; Gohmert denied asking for a pardon for himself and said the January 6 committee hearings were "become nothing more than a Soviet-style propaganda production." In June 2021, Gohmert was one of 21 House Republicans to vote against a resolution to give the Congressional Gold Medal to police officers who defended the U.S. Capitol during the January 6 United States Capitol attack.

In July 2021, Gohmert suggested the Capitol attack was a conspiracy possibly set up by Democrats. In September 2022, upon the release of convicted January 6 participant Simone Gold from federal prison, he gave Gold an American flag that had flown on the Capitol.

In June 2022, Gohmert said, "if you're a Republican, you can't even lie to Congress or lie to an FBI agent or they're coming after you", in response to the indictment of Trump adviser Peter Navarro for non-compliance with the United States House Select Committee on the January 6 Attack. In contrast, Gohmert claimed, "If you're a Democrat, then you can lie. You can cheat", referencing the acquittal of lawyer Michael Sussmann.

=== Support for impeaching Joe Biden and Alejandro Mayorkas ===
Gohmert was one of 32 Republican congress members to cosponsor Andy Biggs' August 2021 resolution to impeach Secretary of Homeland Security Alejandro Mayorkas. He was also one of six Republican congress members to cosponsor Lauren Boebert's September 2021 resolution to impeach President Biden.

=== Committee assignments ===
Committee on the Judiciary

- Subcommittee on the Constitution and Civil Justice
- Subcommittee on Crime, Terrorism, Homeland Security, and Investigations

Committee on Natural Resources (Ranking Member)

- Subcommittee on Energy and Mineral Resources
- Subcommittee on Oversight and Investigations

=== Caucus memberships ===
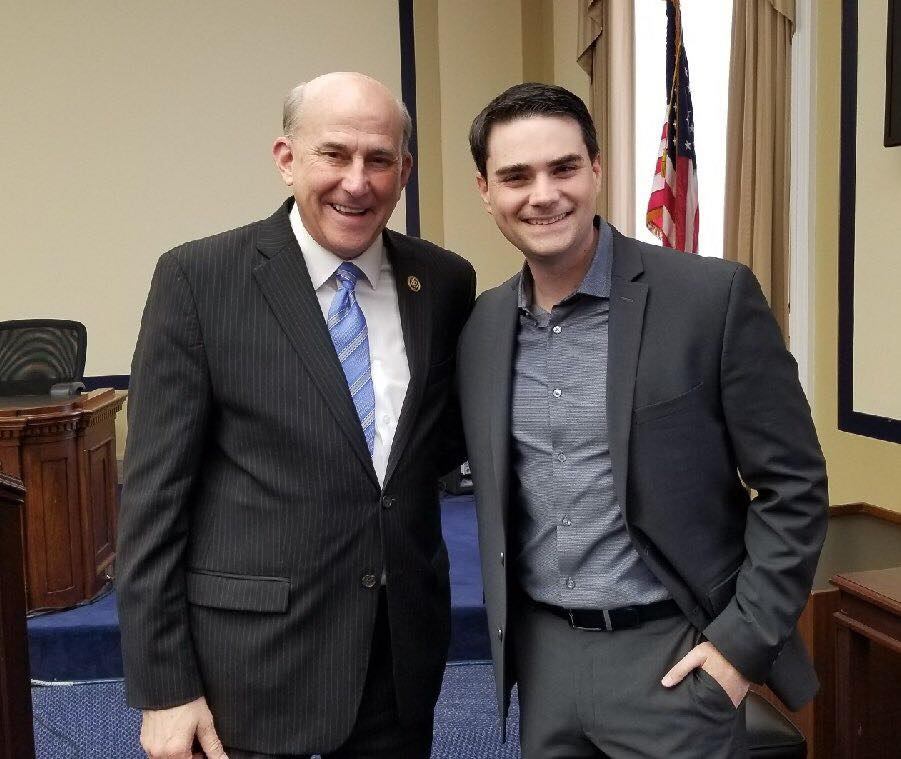
Gohmert with Ben Shapiro in 2018

- Freedom Caucus
- Israel Allies Caucus
- United States Congressional International Conservation Caucus
- Tea Party Caucus
- Republican Study Committee
- Congressional NextGen 9-1-1 Caucus
- Congressional Western Caucus

== Texas Attorney General candidacy ==
In November 2021, Gohmert announced his candidacy in the 2022 Texas Attorney General election instead of seeking re-election in Texas's 1st congressional district, to challenge incumbent Ken Paxton in a crowded Republican primary. He made the announcement to run after saying he would join the race if he could reach $1 million in political donations in 10 days. He stated he had reached the goal; however, campaign finance report show Gohmert had not met the $1 million goal. Gohmert ended last in the four-candidate primary.

He was succeeded in his seat in the House by Nathaniel Moran.

== Electoral history ==
Texas's 1st congressional district election, 2004
Party	Candidate	Votes	%	±%
Republican	Louie Gohmert	157,068	61.5%	
Democratic	Max Sandlin (incumbent)	96,281	37.7%	
Libertarian	Dean L. Tucker	2,158	0.8%	

Texas's 1st congressional district election, 2006
Party	Candidate	Votes	%	±%
Republican	Louie Gohmert (incumbent)	104,099	68.0%	
Democratic	Roger L. Owen	46,303	30.2%	
Libertarian	Donald Perkison	2,668	1.7%	

Texas's 1st congressional district election, 2008
Party	Candidate	Votes	%	±%
Republican	Louie Gohmert (incumbent)	189,012	87.6%	
Independent	Roger L. Owen	26,814	12.4%	

Texas's 1st congressional district election, 2010
Party	Candidate	Votes	%	±%
Republican	Louie Gohmert (incumbent)	129,398	89.7%	
Libertarian	Charles F. Parkes III	14,811	10.3%	

Texas's 1st congressional district election, 2012
Party	Candidate	Votes	%	±%
Republican	Louie Gohmert (incumbent)	178,322	71.4%	
Democratic	Shirley J. McKellar	67,222	26.9%	
Libertarian	Clark Patterson	4,114	1.6%	

Texas's 1st congressional district election, 2014
Party	Candidate	Votes	%	±%
Republican	Louie Gohmert (incumbent)	115,084	77.5%	
Democratic	Shirley J. McKellar	33,476	22.5%	

Texas's 1st congressional district election, 2016
Party	Candidate	Votes	%	±%
Republican	Louie Gohmert (incumbent)	192,434	73.9%	
Democratic	Shirley J. McKellar	62,847	24.1%	
Libertarian	Phil Gray	5,062	1.9%	

Texas's 1st congressional district election, 2018
Party	Candidate	Votes	%	±%
Republican	Louie Gohmert (incumbent)	168,165	72.3%	
Democratic	Shirley J. McKellar	61,263	26.3%	
Libertarian	Jeff Callaway	3,292	1.4%	

Texas's 1st congressional district election, 2020
Party	Candidate	Votes	%	±%
Republican	Louie Gohmert (incumbent)	219,726	72.6%	
Democratic	Hank Gilbert	83,016	27.4%	

Texas Attorney General Primary Election 2022
Party	Candidate	Votes	%	±%
Republican	Ken Paxton (incumbent)	823,199	42.7%	
Republican	George P. Bush	439,240	22.8%	
Republican	Eva Guzman	337,761	17.5%	
Republican	Louis B. Gohmert Jr.	327,257	17.0%	

== Personal life ==
A Southern Baptist, Gohmert attends Green Acres Baptist Church in Tyler, where he has served as a deacon and teaches Sunday school. He and his wife Kathy have three daughters.

== See also ==
- Conspiracy theories related to the Trump–Ukraine scandal
- United States House Select Committee on the January 6 Attack public hearings

U.S. House of Representatives
Preceded by Max Sandlin	Member of the U.S. House of Representatives from Texas's 1st congressional district 2005–2023	Succeeded by Nathaniel Moran
U.S. order of precedence (ceremonial)
Preceded by John Culberson as Former U.S. Representative	Order of precedence of the United States as Former U.S. Representative	Succeeded by Steve King as Former U.S. Representative
