= Baseline Reform Act of 2013 =

- Long title: To amend the Balanced Budget and Emergency Deficit Control Act of 1985 to reform the budget baseline.
- Announced in: the 113th United States Congress
- Sponsored by: Rep. Rob Woodall (R, GA-7)
- Number of co-sponsors: 3

Codification
- Acts affected: Balanced Budget and Emergency Deficit Control Act of 1985, Statutory Pay-As-You-Go Act of 2010, Balanced Budget Act of 1997
- Agencies affected: Office of Management and Budget, Congressional Budget Office

Legislative history
- Introduced in the House as H.R. 1871 by Rep. Rob Woodall (R, GA-7) on May 8, 2013; Committee consideration by United States House Committee on the Budget

The Baseline Reform Act of 2013 (H.R. 1871) is a bill that would change the way in which discretionary appropriations for individual accounts are projected in CBO's baseline. Under H.R. 1871, projections of such spending would still be based on the current year's appropriations, but would not be adjusted for inflation going forward. Other adjustments to projections of future discretionary spending would also be eliminated.

The bill was introduced into the United States House of Representatives during the 113th United States Congress.

== Background ==
=== Baseline budgeting ===
Baseline budgeting is an accounting method the United States Federal Government uses to develop a budget for future years. Baseline budgeting uses current spending levels as the "baseline" for establishing future funding requirements and assumes future budgets will equal the current budget times the inflation rate times the population growth rate. Twice a year—generally in January and August—CBO prepares baseline projections of federal revenues, outlays, and the surplus or deficit. Those projections are designed to show what would happen if current budgetary policies were continued as is—that is, they serve as a benchmark for assessing possible changes in policy. They are not forecasts of actual budget outcomes, since the Congress will undoubtedly enact legislation that will change revenues and outlays. Similarly, they are not intended to represent the appropriate or desirable levels of federal taxes and spending.

=== Related legislation ===
This bill was introduced at the same time as the Pro-Growth Budgeting Act of 2013 (H.R. 1874; 113th Congress) and the Budget and Accounting Transparency Act of 2014 (H.R. 1872; 113th Congress) as a package of budget reform bills.

A similar bill was introduced during the 112th United States Congress and passed the House. Rep. Paul Ryan argued in favor of that bill, saying that "let's not err on the side of assuming every government agency automatically needs a spending increase one year to the next. If we think they need more money, then we should measure it on an honest basis and then legislate more money for those agencies."

== Provisions of the bill ==
This summary is based largely on the summary provided by the Congressional Research Service, a public domain source.

The Baseline Reform Act of 2013 would amend the Balanced Budget and Emergency Deficit Control Act of 1985 (Gramm-Rudman-Hollings Act) to revise the formula for establishing the budget baseline.

The bill would revise the annual baseline, for any fiscal year, to mean a projection of current-year levels of new budget authority (as under current law), outlays (as under current law), or receipts (instead of revenues) and the surplus or deficit (as under current law) for the current year, the budget year, and the ensuing nine outyears based on laws enacted through the applicable date.

The bill would include estimates for direct spending in the baseline calculation formula for the budget year and each outyear.

The bill would revise the formula for calculating the baseline for discretionary spending for the budget year and each outyear to eliminate adjustments for: (1) expiring multiyear subsidized housing contracts; (2) administrative expenses of the Federal Hospital Insurance Trust Fund, the Supplementary Medical Insurance Trust Fund, the Unemployment Trust Fund, and the Railroad Retirement account; (3) offsets to federal employees' annual pay; and (4) certain inflators used to adjust budgetary resources in the Act.

The bill would require the Congressional Budget Office (CBO) to report to the congressional budget committees, on or before July 1 of each year, the Long-Term Budget Outlook for: (1) the fiscal year commencing on October 1 of that year, and (2) at least the ensuing 40 fiscal years.

== Congressional Budget Office report ==
This summary is based largely on the summary provided by the Congressional Budget Office, as ordered reported by the House Committee on the Budget on June 19, 2013. This is a public domain source.

H.R. 1871 would change certain assumptions governing baseline budget projections and require the Congressional Budget Office to provide its Long-Term Budget Outlook report to the House and Senate Committees on the Budget annually. The CBO estimates that enacting H.R. 1871 would not have a significant impact on the federal budget. Enacting H.R. 1871 would not affect direct spending or revenues; therefore, pay-as-you-go procedures do not apply.

The legislation would change the way in which discretionary appropriations for individual accounts are projected in CBO's baseline. Under H.R. 1871, projections of such spending would still be based on the current year's appropriations, but would not be adjusted for inflation going forward. Other adjustments to projections of future discretionary spending would also be eliminated. (In its baseline, CBO assumes that appropriations through 2021 will comply with the caps and other provisions of the Budget Control Act of 2011; as a result, the method of extrapolating discretionary spending may not affect the totals reported in CBO's projections.)

H.R. 1871 also would require that CBO produce its Long-Term Budget Outlook by July 1 each year. Any additional administrative costs to implement H.R. 1871 would be insignificant, because CBO already carries out similar activities.

H.R. 1871 contains no intergovernmental or private-sector mandates as defined in the Unfunded Mandates Reform Act and would have no impact on the budgets of state, local, or tribal governments.

== Procedural history ==
The Baseline Reform Act of 2013 was introduced into the United States House of Representatives on May 8, 2013, by Rep. Rob Woodall (R, GA-7). The bill was referred to the United States House Committee on the Budget. On June 25, 2013, the bill was reported (amended) alongside House Report 113-129.

== Debate and discussion ==
Republicans argued that the bill would improve Congress' ability to balance the federal budget. When this and two other budget reform bill were introduced, House Budget Committee Chairman Paul Ryan said that "these reforms are an important step toward restoring fiscal discipline in Washington," arguing that "by improving the budget process, we can get a better handle on our spending problem." Speaking specifically about this bill, Ryan said that "families don't get automatic raises every year. Neither should Washington."

Rep. Louie Gohmert (R-TX), one of the bill's main sponsors, said that "conservatives have advocated for years that there should be no automatic spending increases in any federal department's budget... that has been a trap so when we simply slow the rate of increase, we are accused of making draconian cuts." Gohmert argued that this legislation would make clearer "what is an increase and what is a cut," put the government in the same situation as American families (who do not get automatic increases), and help with the task of getting the debt under control.

Columnist Bruce Bartlett strongly criticized the bill, calling it an example of "Republican duplicity." Bartlett contends that one of the CBO's necessary assumptions is that "when Congress creates a spending program that its intent is to maintain spending in real terms, adding spending as necessary to compensate for inflation." This bill would instruct the CBO not to take inflation into account, which would cause real spending to "fall by the rate of inflation." According to Bartlett, this legislation would allow Republicans to hold the spending constant on programs they don't like in order to avoid directly cutting them, even as inflation reduces the real spending on that program for them. Bartlett says that Republicans will "let inflation do their dirty work" and that this bill "is part of a long-term effort to eliminate data collection or pervert it so that policy is biased toward Republican priorities."

== See also ==
- List of bills in the 113th United States Congress
- Baseline (budgeting)
