= Static analysis =

Simplified analysis of the short term

Static analysis, static projection, or static scoring is a simplified analysis wherein the effect of an immediate change to a system is calculated without regard to the longer-term response of the system to that change. If the short-term effect is then extrapolated to the long term, such extrapolation is inappropriate.

Its opposite, dynamic analysis or dynamic scoring, is an attempt to take into account how the system is likely to respond to the change over time. One common use of these terms is budget policy in the United States, although it also occurs in many other statistical disputes.

== Examples ==
A famous example of extrapolation of static analysis comes from overpopulation theory. Starting with Thomas Malthus at the end of the 18th century, various commentators have projected some short-term population growth trend for years into the future, resulting in the prediction that there would be disastrous overpopulation within a generation or two. Malthus himself essentially claimed that British society would collapse under the weight of overpopulation by 1850, while during the 1960s the book The Population Bomb made similar dire predictions for the US by the 1980s.

For economic policy discussions, predictions that assume no significant change of behavior in response to change in incentives are often termed static projection (and in the US Congressional Budget Office, "static scoring").

However, when applied to dynamically responsive systems, static analysis improperly extrapolated tends to produce results that are not only incorrect but opposite in direction to what was predicted, as shown in the following applications.

== Applications ==
=== Technological singularity ===
Some have criticized the notion of a technological singularity as an instance of static analysis: accelerating change in some factor of information growth, such as Moore's law or computer intelligence, is projected into the future, resulting in exponential growth or hyperbolic growth (to a singularity), that suggests that everything will be known by a relatively early date.

== See also ==
- Dynamic scoring
- Extrapolation
- Static program analysis (computer science)
