= Federal Unemployment Tax Act =

United States federal law

- Other short titles: FUTA
- Long title: An Act To levy an excise tax on employers of eight or more individuals and to provide for cooperation with State unemployment compensation laws, and for other purposes
- Acronyms (colloquial): FUTA
- Enacted by: the 74th United States Congress

Citations
- Public law: Pub. L. 74–271
- Statutes at Large: 49 Stat. 620

Codification
- Acts amended: Social Security Act
- Titles amended: 26

Legislative history
- Introduced in the House as H.R. 7260 by Robert L. Doughton; Committee consideration by House Ways and Means; Passed the House on; Passed the Senate on; Signed into law by President Franklin D. Roosevelt on August 14, 1935

United States Supreme Court cases
- Steward Machine Company v. Davis

The Federal Unemployment Tax Act (or FUTA, I.R.C. ch. 23) is a United States federal law that imposes a federal employer tax used to help fund state workforce agencies. Employers report this tax by filing Internal Revenue Service Form 940 annually. In some cases, employers are required to pay the tax in installments during the tax year.

FUTA covers a federal share of unemployment insurance (UI) and job service program administration costs in every state. In addition, FUTA pays one-half the cost of extended unemployment benefits during periods of high unemployment. It also provides a fund that states can borrow from when necessary to pay benefits.

== Legal basis ==
The legality of FUTA has been affirmed in the 1937 Supreme Court case Steward Machine Co. v. Davis.

== Amount of tax ==
Until June 30, 2011, the Federal Unemployment Tax Act imposed a tax of 6.2%, which was composed of a permanent rate of 6.0% and a temporary rate of 0.2%, which was passed by Congress in 1976. The temporary rate was extended many times, but it expired on June 30, 2011.

Consequently, for the years until 2010 and the first six months of 2011, the FUTA imposed a 6.2% tax (before credits) on the first $7,000 of gross earnings of each worker per year. Once the worker's earnings reach $7,000 during a given year, the employer no longer pays any FUTA for that year with respect to that worker. Certain credits are allowed with respect to state unemployment taxes paid that may reduce the effective FUTA rate to 0.8%.

Effective July 1, 2011, the rate decreased to 6.0%. That rate may be reduced by an amount up to 5.4% through credits for contributions to state unemployment programs under sections 3302(a) and 3302(b), resulting in a minimum effective rate on and after July 1, 2011 of 0.6% (6.0–5.4%).

=== Credit reduction ===
The credit against the federal tax may be reduced if the state has an outstanding advance (commonly called a "loan"). When states lack the funds to pay unemployment insurance, they may obtain loans from the federal government. To ensure that these loans are repaid and in accordance with Title XII of the Social Security Act, the federal government is entitled to recover them by reducing the FUTA credit it gives to employers, which is the equivalent of an overall increase in the FUTA tax. When a state has an outstanding loan balance on January 1 for two consecutive years, and the full amount of the loan is not repaid by November 10 of the second year, the FUTA credit will be reduced until the loan is repaid. That process is commonly called FUTA credit reduction and was designed as an involuntary repayment mechanism. The reduction schedule is 0.3% for the first year and an additional 0.3% for each succeeding year until the loan is repaid. From the third year onward, there may be additional reductions in the FUTA tax credit (commonly dubbed "add-ons"). For example, for taxable years 2012 and 2013, the Virgin Islands had a 2.7% "add-on" when its tax rate on total wages was below a national minimum. For taxable year 2014, Connecticut had a "BCR add-on" when its tax rate on the taxable portion of covered wages in the previous calendar year was less than the 5-year benefit–cost ratio applicable for the taxable year.

Based on their loan status on November 10, 2016, California and the Virgin Islands are the only two jurisdictions that received reduced FUTA credit for taxable year 2016. Employers in these states will pay extra FUTA taxes that are effective retroactively to January 1, 2016.

Below is a list of FUTA state credit reductions for taxable year 2009 through 2016, and their respective reduction amounts (in %):

State or District	2009	2010	2011	2012	2013	2014	2015	2016
Arizona	–	–	–	0.3	–	–	–	–
Arkansas	–	–	0.3	0.6	0.9	–	–	–
California	–	–	0.3	0.6	0.9	1.2	1.5	1.8
Connecticut	–	–	0.3	0.6	0.9	1.7	2.1	–
Delaware	–	–	–	0.3	0.6	–	–	–
Florida	–	–	0.3	0.6	–	–	–	–
Georgia	–	–	0.3	0.6	0.9	–	–	–
Illinois	–	–	0.3	–	–	–	–	–
Indiana	–	0.3	0.6	0.9	1.2	1.5	–	–
Kentucky	–	–	0.3	0.6	0.9	1.2	–	–
Michigan	0.3	0.6	0.9	–	–	–	–	–
Minnesota	–	–	0.3	–	–	–	–	–
Missouri	–	–	0.3	0.6	0.9	–	–	–
North Carolina	–	–	0.3	0.6	0.9	1.2	–	–
New Jersey	–	–	0.3	0.6	–	–	–	–
Nevada	–	–	0.3	0.6	–	–	–	–
New York	–	–	0.3	0.6	0.9	1.2	–	–
Ohio	–	–	0.3	0.6	0.9	1.2	1.5	–
Pennsylvania	–	–	0.3	–	–	–	–	–
Rhode Island	–	–	0.3	0.6	0.9	–	–	–
South Carolina	–	0.3	–	–	–	–	–	–
Vermont	–	–	–	0.3	–	–	–	–
Virginia	–	–	0.3	–	–	–	–	–
Virgin Islands	–	–	0.3	1.5	1.2	1.2	1.5	1.8
Wisconsin	–	–	0.3	0.6	0.9	–	–	–

=== FUTA and general taxes comparison table ===
The major taxes that employers have to pay include FUTA, SUTA, Sales Tax, Medicare, and Social Security.

Tax	Percentage	Conditions
Sales Tax	varies by state, between 0% to less than 10%	A consumer tax collected for the government by the business and applied at the final point of sale (retailer, wholesalers, etc. excluded)
SUTA	Varies by State. Generally 2–5%	Employers only.
FUTA	6%. Can be reduced to 0.6%	Employers only
Medicare	1.45% (matched by employer)	Employers and Employees. Rate can go to 2.4% for employees earning above $200,000.
Social Security	6.2%	Employers and Employees

Businesses also pay many other taxes, such as state franchise taxes, business inventory taxes, property taxes, state income tax, federal income tax, etc.

== Exempt wages ==
The following wages are exempt from Federal Unemployment Tax Act payments:

1. Wages for services performed outside the United States.
2. Wages paid to a deceased employee or a deceased employee's estate in any year after the year of the employee's death.
3. Wages paid by a parent to a child under age 21, paid by a child to a parent, or paid by one spouse to the other spouse.
4. Wages paid by a foreign government or international organization.
5. Wages paid by a state or local government or by the United States federal government.
6. Wages paid by a hospital to interns.
7. Wages paid to newspaper carriers under age 18.
8. Wages paid by a school to a student of the school.
9. Wages paid by an organized seasonal camp to a full-time student who worked fewer than 13 calendar weeks during the calendar year.
10. Wages paid by 501(c)(3) nonprofit organizations.

== See also ==
- Surtax
- Unemployment Trust Fund
