= Pro-Growth Budgeting Act of 2013 =

2013 proposed legislature of the United States

- Long title: To amend the Congressional Budget Act of 1974 to provide for macroeconomic analysis of the impact of legislation.
- Announced in: the 113th United States Congress
- Sponsored by: Rep. Tom Price (R, GA-6)
- Number of co-sponsors: 29

Codification
- Acts affected: Congressional Budget Act of 1974
- Agencies affected: United States House of Representatives, Office of Management and Budget, Congressional Budget Office, United States Senate

Legislative history
- Introduced in the House as H.R. 1874 by Rep. Tom Price (R, GA-6) on May 8, 2013; Committee consideration by United States House Committee on the Budget, United States House Committee on Rules

The Pro-Growth Budgeting Act of 2013 (H.R. 1874) is a bill that would require the Congressional Budget Office to provide a macroeconomic impact analysis for bills that are estimated to have a large budgetary effect.

The bill was introduced into the United States House of Representatives during the 113th United States Congress. The Pro-Growth Budgeting Act of 2013 was introduced at the same time as the Baseline Reform Act of 2013 (H.R. 1871; 113th Congress) and the Budget and Accounting Transparency Act of 2014 (H.R. 1872; 113th Congress) as a package of budget reform bills.

== Provisions of the bill ==
This summary is based largely on the summary provided by the Congressional Research Service, a public domain source.

The Pro-Growth Budgeting Act of 2013 would amend the Congressional Budget Act of 1974 (CBA) to require the Congressional Budget Office (CBO) to prepare for each major bill or resolution reported by any congressional committee (except the congressional appropriations committees), as a supplement to CBO cost estimates, a macroeconomic impact analysis of the budgetary effects of such legislation for the 10-fiscal year period beginning with the first fiscal year for which such estimate was prepared and each of the next three 10-fiscal year periods.

The bill would define "major bill or resolution" as any bill or resolution whose budgetary effects, for any fiscal year in the period for which a CBO cost estimate is prepared, is estimated to be greater than .25% of the current projected U.S. gross domestic product (GDP) for that fiscal year.

The bill would require the analysis to describe: (1) the potential economic impact of the bill or resolution on major economic variables, including real GDP, business investment, the capital stock, employment, interest rates, and labor supply; and (2) the potential fiscal effects of the measure, including any estimates of revenue increases or decreases resulting from changes in GDP.

The bill would require the analysis (or a technical appendix to it) to specify the economic and econometric models used, sources of data, relevant data transformations, as well as any explanation necessary to make the models comprehensible to academic and public policy analysts.

== Congressional Budget Office report ==
This summary is based largely on the summary provided by the Congressional Budget Office, as ordered reported by the House Committee on the Budget on June 19, 2013. This is a public domain source.

H.R. 1874 would require the Congressional Budget Office to provide a macroeconomic impact analysis for bills that are estimated to have a large budgetary effect.

Under H.R. 1874, the CBO would be required to provide—to the extent practicable—an analysis of the impact on the economy of any bill that would have an estimated budgetary effect of greater than 0.25 percent of gross domestic product (GDP) in any fiscal year. (Currently, that threshold would be about $40 billion, based on GDP of about $16 trillion.) The macroeconomic analysis would include the estimated effect on revenues and outlays of a change in GDP resulting from the legislation being evaluated. The bill also would require CBO to publicly provide the assumptions and models underlying those analyses.

The CBO estimates that implementing H.R. 1874 would cost about $2 million over the 2014-2018 period, assuming appropriation of the necessary amounts. Enacting H.R. 1874 would not affect direct spending or revenues; therefore, pay-as-you-go procedures do not apply.

H.R. 1874 contains no intergovernmental or private-sector mandates as defined in the Unfunded Mandates Reform Act.

== Procedural history ==
The Pro-Growth Budgeting Act of 2013 was introduced into the United States House of Representatives on May 8, 2013, by Rep. Tom Price (R, GA-6). The bill was referred to the United States House Committee on the Budget and the United States House Committee on Rules. It was reported (amended) alongside House Report 113-161 part 1 on July 19, 2014.

== Debate and discussion ==
Rep. Paul Ryan supported the bill, saying that this bill and several related reform bills "are an important step toward restoring fiscal discipline in Washington." Ryan said that he thought "by improving the budget process, we can get a better handle on our spending problem."

Rep. Tom Price, who introduced the bill, said it was necessary because the Congressional Budget Office's current method of reviewing bills just to see what they would cost. Price said "that is a model that has proven to be incapable of providing the type of macroeconomic diagnosis folks need to make sure we are pursuing policies that will help generate economic opportunity and bring down the nation's debt."

The organization Americans for Prosperity supported the bill, arguing that requiring the CBO to use "dynamic scoring it its reports" would "give Congress a more realistic estimate of the fiscal impact of federal legislation." Americans For Prosperity argued that under the current system, which "fails to account for how the economy will react to new policies" such as higher taxes, there is a bias "in favor of big-government policies."

Democrats on the House Budget Committee criticized the bill, writing that dynamic scoring is "a methodology favored by Republicans because its subjective nature lends itself to the make-believe theory that tax breaks for the wealthy pay for themselves due to trickle-down economics."

== See also ==
- List of bills in the 113th United States Congress
- Dynamic scoring
