= State unemployment tax act =

Taxes under State Unemployment Tax Act (or SUTA) are those designed to finance the cost of state unemployment insurance benefits in the United States, which make up all of unemployment insurance expenditures in normal times, and the majority of unemployment insurance expenditures during downturns, with the remainder paid in part by the federal government for "emergency" benefit extensions.

The tax is unique in two primary aspects. First, the tax is experience rated which means that tax rates are firm-specific and the rate a firm faces updates each year to reflect the cost of the benefits that firm's former employees have received recently. Because it is primarily firms in stress that generate layoffs, these tax increases target firms that are already under strain. For this reason, states limit how high they allow taxes to rise, but these limits vary by almost an order of magnitude from state to state.

The second unique feature of UI taxes under SUTA is that the taxable base is ~$10,000 (on average, varies by state) per employee, much less than the average yearly earnings of a given worker. Because of this feature, firms pay a fixed "lump sum" tax per worker they employ. This provides a modest incentive for firms to reduce unskilled and part-time work in favor of skilled and full-time work.

One interesting feature of the UI tax is that it targets firms that have recently had layoffs, potentially hitting distressed firms. Recent work shows that UI tax increases significantly reduce hiring and employment in affected firms, potentially eroding the macroeconomics stabilizing influence of the UI program.
