= Econometric model =

Statistical models used in econometrics

Econometric models are statistical models used in econometrics. An econometric model specifies the statistical relationship that is believed to hold between the various economic quantities pertaining to a particular economic phenomenon. An econometric model can be derived from a deterministic economic model by allowing for uncertainty, or from an economic model which itself is stochastic. However, it is also possible to use econometric models that are not tied to any specific economic theory.

A simple example of an econometric model is one that assumes that monthly spending by consumers is linearly dependent on consumers' income in the previous month. Then the model will consist of the equation

$$C_t = a + bY_{t-1} + e_t,$$

where C_{t} is consumer spending in month t, Y_{t-1} is income during the previous month, and e_{t} is an error term measuring the extent to which the model cannot fully explain consumption. Then one objective of the econometrician is to obtain estimates of the parameters a and b; these estimated parameter values, when used in the model's equation, enable predictions for future values of consumption to be made contingent on the prior month's income.

== Formal definition ==
In econometrics, as in statistics in general, it is presupposed that the quantities being analyzed can be treated as random variables. An econometric model then is a set of joint probability distributions to which the true joint probability distribution of the variables under study is supposed to belong. In the case in which the elements of this set can be indexed by a finite number of real-valued parameters, the model is called a parametric model; otherwise it is a nonparametric or semiparametric model. A large part of econometrics is the study of methods for selecting models, estimating them, and carrying out inference on them.

The most common econometric models are structural, in that they convey causal and counterfactual information, and are used for policy evaluation. For example, an equation modeling consumption spending based on income could be used to see what consumption would be contingent on any of various hypothetical levels of income, only one of which (depending on the choice of a fiscal policy) will end up actually occurring.

== Basic models ==
Some of the common econometric models are:

- Linear regression
- Generalized linear models
- Probit
- Logit
- Tobit
- ARIMA
- Vector Autoregression
- Cointegration
- Hazard

== Use in policy-making ==
Comprehensive models of macroeconomic relationships are used by central banks and governments to evaluate and guide economic policy. One famous econometric model of this nature is the Federal Reserve Bank econometric model.

== See also ==
- Benefit financing model
