= Budget and Accounting Transparency Act of 2014 =

- Long title: To amend the Balanced Budget and Emergency Deficit Control Act of 1985 to increase transparency in Federal budgeting, and for other purposes.
- Announced in: the 113th United States Congress
- Sponsored by: Rep. Scott Garrett (R, NJ-5)
- Number of co-sponsors: 7

Codification
- Acts affected: Congressional Budget Act of 1974, Federal Housing Enterprises Financial Safety and Soundness Act of 1992, Balanced Budget and Emergency Deficit Control Act of 1985, Federal Financing Bank Act of 1973, Congressional Budget Act of 1990, and others.
- U.S.C. sections affected: 31 U.S.C. § 1108, 31 U.S.C. ch. 15, 12 U.S.C. § 4502, 12 U.S.C. § 4617
- Agencies affected: Government Accountability Office, United States House of Representatives, National Credit Union Administration, Federal Financing Bank, Federal Deposit Insurance Corporation, Executive Office of the President, Office of Management and Budget, Tennessee Valley Authority, Commodity Credit Corporation, Congressional Budget Office, United States Department of the Treasury, Fannie Mae, Pension Benefit Guaranty Corporation, Federal Housing Finance Agency, Freddie Mac, Federal Crop Insurance Corporation, United States Senate

Legislative history
- Introduced in the House as H.R. 1872 by Rep. Scott Garrett (R, NJ-5) on May 8, 2013; Committee consideration by United States House Committee on the Budget, United States House Committee on Oversight and Government Reform

The Budget and Accounting Transparency Act of 2014 (H.R. 1872) is a bill that would modify the budgetary treatment of federal credit programs. The bill would require that the cost of direct loans or loan guarantees be recognized in the federal budget on a fair-value basis using guidelines set forth by the Financial Accounting Standards Board. The bill would also require the federal budget to reflect the net impact of programs administered by Fannie Mae and Freddie Mac. The changes made by the bill would mean that Fannie Mae and Freddie Mac were counted on the budget instead of considered separately and would mean that the debt of those two programs would be included in the national debt. These programs themselves would not be changed, but how they are accounted for in the United States federal budget would be. The goal of the bill is to improve the accuracy of how some programs are accounted for in the federal budget.

The bill was introduced into the United States House of Representatives during the 113th United States Congress.

== Background ==
This bill was introduced at the same time as the Pro-Growth Budgeting Act of 2013 (H.R. 1874; 113th Congress) and the Baseline Reform Act of 2013 (H.R. 1871; 113th Congress) as a package of budget reform bills.

=== Federal takeover of Fannie Mae and Freddie Mac ===
The federal takeover of Fannie Mae and Freddie Mac refers to the placing into conservatorship of government-sponsored enterprises Fannie Mae and Freddie Mac by the U.S. Treasury in September 2008. It was one of the financial events among many in the ongoing subprime mortgage crisis.

On September 6, 2008, the director of the Federal Housing Finance Agency (FHFA), James B. Lockhart III, announced his decision to place two Government-sponsored enterprises (GSEs), Fannie Mae (Federal National Mortgage Association) and Freddie Mac (Federal Home Loan Mortgage Corporation), into conservatorship run by the FHFA. United States Treasury Secretary Henry Paulson, stated that placing the two GSEs into conservatorship was a decision he fully supported, and that he advised "that conservatorship was the only form in which I would commit taxpayer money to the GSEs." He further said that "I attribute the need for today's action primarily to the inherent conflict and flawed business model embedded in the GSE structure, and to the ongoing housing correction." That same day, Federal Reserve Bank chairman Ben Bernanke stated his support: "I strongly endorse both the decision by FHFA Director Lockhart to place Fannie Mae and Freddie Mac into conservatorship and the actions taken by Treasury Secretary Paulson to ensure the financial soundness of those two companies."

The combined GSE losses of US$14.9 billion and market concerns about their ability to raise capital and debt threatened to disrupt the U.S. housing financial market. The Treasury committed to invest as much as US$200 billion in preferred stock and extend credit through 2009 to keep the GSEs solvent and operating. The two GSEs have outstanding more than US$5 trillion in mortgage-backed securities (MBS) and debt; the debt portion alone is $1.6 trillion. The conservatorship action has been described as "one of the most sweeping government interventions in private financial markets in decades," and one that "could turn into the biggest and costliest government bailout ever of private companies".

== Provisions of the bill ==
This summary is based largely on the summary provided by the Congressional Research Service, a public domain source.

The Budget and Accounting Transparency Act of 2014 would amend the Federal Credit Reform Act of 1990 (FCRA) (title V of the Congressional Budget Act of 1974 [CBA]) to revise the budgetary treatment of federal direct loans and loan guarantees to account for them on a fair value basis (currently, a FCRA accrual basis).

The bill would require the President's budget from FY1992 on to reflect the Treasury discounting component of direct loan and loan guarantee programs. Defines the "Treasury discounting component" as the estimated long-term cost to the federal government of a direct loan or loan guarantee (or modification) calculated on a net present value basis, excluding administrative costs and any incidental effects on governmental receipts or outlays.

The bill would revise other requirements for the President's budget, beginning with FY2015, including conditions for new direct loans or loan guarantee commitments. Requires new budget authority for such loans or loan guarantee commitments to be provided in advance in an appropriation Act.

The bill would exempt a direct loan or loan guarantee program that constitutes an entitlement (such as the guaranteed student loan program or the veteran's home loan guaranty program), all existing credit programs of the Commodity Credit Corporation (CCC), or any direct loan or loan guarantee made by the Federal National Mortgage Association (Fannie Mae) or the Federal Home Loan Mortgage Corporation (Freddie Mac) (government-sponsored enterprises or GSEs) from: (1) the above requirement, and (2) the prohibition against modification of an outstanding direct loan or loan guarantee in a manner that increases its costs unless budget authority for the additional cost has been provided in advance in an appropriation Act.

The bill would repeal the general authorization of appropriations to federal agencies for the cost associated with such direct loan obligations or loan guarantee commitments.

The bill would revise requirements for Treasury transactions with financing accounts (nonbudget accounts associated with each program account which holds balances, receives the cost payment from the program account, and also includes all other cash flows to and from the federal government resulting from direct loan obligations or loan guarantee commitments made on or after October 1, 1991).

The bill would limit the availability of amounts in liquidating accounts to specified payments resulting from direct loan obligations or loan guarantee commitments made before October 1, 1991.

The bill would amend the Balanced Budget and Emergency Deficit Control Act of 1985 (Gramm-Rudman-Hollings Act) to treat a change in discretionary spending solely as a result of the amendment to title V of the CBA made by this Act as a change of concept (requiring adjustments to discretionary spending limits).

The bill would require the Office of Management and Budget (OMB), before adjusting such discretionary spending limits, to report to the congressional budget committees on the amount of that adjustment and other specified related matters.

The bill would require each of the Directors of the Congressional Budget Office (CBO) and of the Office of Management and Budget (OMB) to study and make recommendations to the congressional budget committees on the feasibility of applying fair value concepts to budgeting for the costs of federal insurance programs.

The bill would require the receipts and disbursements, including the administrative expenses, of the GSEs to be counted as new budget authority, outlays, receipts, or deficit or surplus for purposes of: (1) the President's budget, (2) the congressional budget, and (3) the Gramm-Rudman-Hollings Act.

The bill would terminate mandatory on-budget status treatment for a GSE after all of the following occurs: (1) its conservatorship has been terminated; (2) the Director of the Federal Housing Finance Agency (FHFA) has certified in writing that the GSE has repaid to the federal government the maximum amount consistent with minimizing the total federal cost of the financial assistance provided to the GSE; and (3) its charter has been revoked, annulled, or terminated and its authorizing statute has been repealed.

The bill would require OMB to: (1) study the history of offsetting collections against expenditures and the amount of receipts collected annually, especially the historical application of the budgetary terms "revenue," "offsetting collections," and "offsetting receipts"; and (2) review the application of those terms and make recommendations to the congressional budget committees on whether such usage should be continued or modified.

The bill would require any federal agency, whenever it prepares and submits written budget justification materials for any congressional committee, to post them on the same day as its submission on the "open" page of its public website.

The bill would require OMB to: (1) post the budget justification in a centralized location on its website in an OMB developed format, and (2) notify each federal agency of the format in which to post it.

== Congressional Budget Office report ==
This summary is based largely on the summary provided by the Congressional Budget Office, as ordered reported by the House Committee on the Budget on February 11, 2014. This is a public domain source.

H.R. 1872 would modify the budgetary treatment of federal credit programs. Specifically, the bill would amend the Federal Credit Reform Act of 1990 (FCRA) to require that, beginning in fiscal year 2017, the cost of direct loans or loan guarantees be recognized in the federal budget on a fair-value basis using guidelines set forth by the Financial Accounting Standards Board. A fair-value approach to accounting for the cost of federal loans and loan guarantees would produce estimates of costs that either correspond to or approximate the value of those loans or guarantees to buyers in the private market.

The bill also would require that the Government Accountability Office (GAO) produce annual reports on the progress that federal agencies make in its implementation; the federal budget reflect the net impact of programs administered by Fannie Mae and Freddie Mac; federal agencies post budget justifications on public websites on the same day they are submitted to the Congress; and the Office of Management and Budget (OMB) and the Congressional Budget Office (CBO) prepare studies on the costs of federal insurance programs and the historical application of the budgetary terms revenue, offsetting collections, and offsetting receipts.

The proposed changes to the budgetary treatment of federal credit programs would increase the estimated costs of such programs compared to measures used under current law. (This legislation would not change the terms of such credit programs, but would change what is recorded in the budget as the cost of credit assistance.) CBO estimates that if fair-value procedures were used to estimate the cost of new credit activity in 2014, the total deficit for the year would be about $50 billion greater than the deficit as measured under current estimating procedures. Because that increased cost would stem from a change in concepts and definitions used to prepare federal budget documents rather than a change in agencies' legal authority to operate credit programs, it would not be an additional cost attributed to H.R. 1872 for Congressional budget enforcement procedures.

The CBO estimates that measuring the cost of federal credit programs on a fair-value basis as prescribed under H.R. 1872 would increase agencies' administrative costs to operate such programs. In addition, the requirements to post budget justifications on the Internet and produce studies would require additional resources. Assuming appropriation of the necessary amounts, the CBO estimates such costs would total $16 million over the 2014-2019 period. Pay-as-you-go procedures do not apply to this legislation because no additional direct spending would be attributable to H.R. 1872 since it would not change credit programs. The legislation would not affect revenues.

H.R. 1872 contains no intergovernmental or private-sector mandates as defined in the Unfunded Mandates Reform Act (UMRA) and would impose no costs on state, local, or tribal governments.

== Procedural history ==
The Budget and Accounting Transparency Act of 2014 was introduced into the United States House of Representatives on May 8, 2013 by Rep. Scott Garrett (R, NJ-5). The bill was referred to the United States House Committee on the Budget and the United States House Committee on Oversight and Government Reform. It was reported (amended) alongside House Report 113-381 part 1 on March 18, 2014.

== Debate and discussion ==
Republicans argued that the bill would improve Congress' ability to balance the federal budget. When this and two other budget reform bills were introduced, House Budget Committee Chairman Paul Ryan said that "these reforms are an important step toward restoring fiscal discipline in Washington," arguing that "by improving the budget process, we can get a better handle on our spending problem."

Romina Boccia of the right-wing organization The Heritage Foundation wrote a report in favor of the legislation, arguing that "improper accounting in the budget for the downside risks that the GSEs (Government-sponsored enterprise) pose for American taxpayers is creating the illusion that the GSEs are a free lunch for Washington." Boccia argued that because the GSEs were "off-budget", it changed the incentives and distorted the federal budget, hiding "the real cost to taxpayers from federal control of Fannie and Freddie." The distortion is due to the federal government counting as income the profits, but not counting the debt of Fannie and Freddie as national debt.

In contrast, Richard Kogan of the Center on Budget and Policy Priorities argues that the bill would make "federal loan and loan guarantee programs look more expensive to the federal government than they really are." Kogan expresses his concern that due to the apparently increased costs of various programs, policymakers may react by raising taxes and cutting programs. Kogan cites numbers from the CBO saying that 44 of the 100 programs that would be counted differently actually make money (through fees and interest), but 33 of them would look like they cost the government money under the bill's new counting requirements.

== See also ==
- List of bills in the 113th United States Congress
- Government-sponsored enterprise
