= Unemployment Trust Fund =

The Unemployment Trust Fund (UTF) is composed of 59 accounts in the United States Treasury related to unemployment insurance program. Specifically, there are 53 state accounts, 4 federal accounts, and 2 accounts in connection with Railroad Retirement Board.

== State accounts ==
There is one account for each state (plus District of Columbia, Puerto Rico, and the Virgin Islands). Each state account consists of the contributions and reimbursements collected by the state. Interest earned on these amounts are credited to the state accounts. Money is withdrawn from state accounts mainly to pay unemployment benefits with limited statutory exceptions.

States sometimes use the term "Unemployment Trust Fund" to refer to their own state account.

== Federal accounts ==
There are four federal accounts in the UTF that are used to provide federal financing.

1. The Employment Security Administration Account (ESAA) is used to fund the administrative costs of the UI system and of other related programs. Virtually all of the income to this account is from FUTA tax.
2. The Extended Unemployment Compensation Account (EUCA) pays for the federal share (50%) of benefit outlays under the federal-state EB program. EUCA is also used to fund temporary recessionary benefit programs, such as the Emergency Unemployment Compensation (EUC) program.
3. The Federal Unemployment Account (FUA) provides loans to states under Title XII of the Social Security Act. All state loan repayments, either voluntary or through FUTA credit reduction, are deposited in this account, and so are loan interest payments.
4. The Federal Employees Compensation Account (FECA) finances benefit payments to former federal civilian and military employees.

== See also ==
- Federal Unemployment Tax Act
- FUTA credit reduction
