= Baseline (budgeting) =

Accounting method

Baseline budgeting is an accounting method the United States Federal Government uses to develop a budget for future years. Baseline budgeting uses current spending levels as the "baseline" for establishing future funding requirements and assumes future budgets will equal the current budget times the inflation rate times the population growth rate. Twice a year—generally in January and August—CBO prepares baseline projections of federal revenues, outlays, and the surplus or deficit. Those projections are designed to show what would happen if current budgetary policies were continued as is—that is, they serve as a benchmark for assessing possible changes in policy. They are not forecasts of actual budget outcomes, since the Congress will undoubtedly enact legislation that will change revenues and outlays. Similarly, they are not intended to represent the appropriate or desirable levels of federal taxes and spending.

== Baseline ==
According to the Government Accountability Office, a Baseline is as follows: "An estimate of spending, revenue, the deficit or surplus, and the public debt expected during a fiscal year under current laws and current policy. The baseline is a benchmark for measuring the budgetary effects of proposed changes in revenues and spending. It assumes that receipts and mandatory spending will continue or expire in the future as required by law and that the future funding for discretionary programs will equal the most recently enacted appropriation, adjusted for inflation. Under the Budget Enforcement Act (BEA), to expire at the end of fiscal year 2006, the baseline is defined as the projection of current-year levels of new budget authority, outlays, revenues, and the surplus or deficit into the budget year and out-years based on laws enacted through the applicable date.

== History ==
The genesis of baseline budget projections can be found in the Congressional Budget Act of 1974. That act required the Office of Management and Budget (OMB) to prepare projections of federal spending for the upcoming fiscal year based on a continuation of the existing level of governmental services. It also required the newly established Congressional Budget Office to prepare five-year projections of budget authority, outlays, revenues, and the surplus or deficit. OMB published its initial current-services budget projections in November 1974, and CBO's five-year projections first appeared in January 1976. Today's baseline budget projections are very much like those prepared more than two decades ago, although they now span 10 years instead of five.

The Budget Act was silent on whether to adjust estimates of discretionary appropriations for anticipated changes in inflation. Until 1980, OMB's projections excluded inflation adjustments for discretionary programs. CBO's projections, however, assumed that appropriations would keep pace with inflation, although CBO has also published projections without these so-called discretionary inflation adjustments.

CBO's budget projections took on added importance in 1980 and 1981, when they served as the baseline for computing spending reductions to be achieved in the budget reconciliation process. The reconciliation instructions contained in the fiscal year 1982 budget resolution (the so-called Gramm-Latta budget) required House and Senate committees to reduce outlays by a total of $36 billion below baseline levels, but each committee could determine how those savings were to be achieved. The CBO baseline has been used in every year since 1981 for developing budget resolutions and measuring compliance with reconciliation instructions.

The Balanced Budget and Emergency Deficit Control Act of 1985 provided the first legal definition of baseline. For the most part, the act defined the baseline in conformity with previous usage. If appropriations had not been enacted for the upcoming fiscal year, the baseline was to assume the previous year's level without any adjustment for inflation. In 1987, however, the Congress amended the definition of the baseline so that discretionary appropriations would be adjusted to keep pace with inflation. Other technical changes, annual increase of now approximately 3% plus inflation, to the definition of the baseline were enacted in 1990, 1993, and 1997. Presently, the [automatic annual] Baseline Budgeting increase is about 7%.

Baseline budget projections increasingly became the subject of political debate and controversy during the late 1980s and early 1990s, and more recently during the 2011 debt limit debate. Some critics contend that baseline projections create a bias in favor of spending by assuming that federal spending keeps pace with inflation and other factors driving the growth of entitlement programs. Changes that merely slow the growth of federal spending programs have often been described as cuts in spending, when in reality they are actually reductions in the rate of spending growth.

There have been attempts to eliminate the baseline budget concept and replace it with zero based budgeting, which is the opposite of baseline budgeting. Zero based budgeting requires that all spending must be re-justified each year or it will be eliminated from the budget regardless of previous spending levels.

== CBO Baseline ==
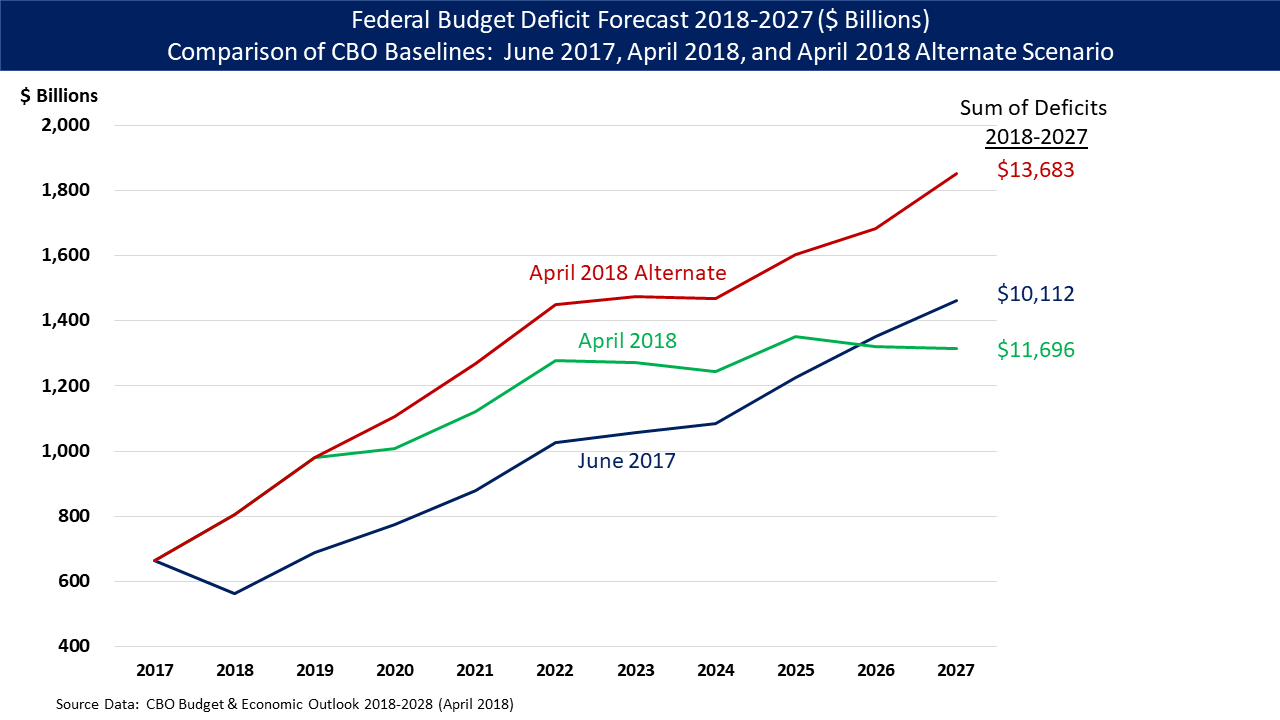
Congressional Budget Office (CBO) baseline scenario comparisons: June 2017 (essentially the deficit trajectory that President Trump inherited from President Obama), April 2018 (which reflects Trump's tax cuts and spending bills), and April 2018 alternate scenario (which assumes extension of the Trump tax cuts, among other current policy extensions).

CBO prepares a "current law" baseline, which assumes laws currently in place will continue over the forecast period. It also makes particular economic assumptions. CBO sometimes prepares a "current policy" or "alternate" baseline, which assumes policies currently in place continue instead. For example, if a tax cut is scheduled to expire, the assumption that it will expire as scheduled will appear in the current law baseline. Assuming the tax cuts are extended would appear in the "current policy" baseline. CBO issues forecasts of varying durations, typically 10 years in their "Budget and Economic Outlook" which is published early each year.

Comparing different baselines across time has several analytical implications:

- Comparing a previous current law baseline to the latest current law baseline allows evaluation of major policy changes. For example, there was a significant increase in the deficit and debt forecast between the June 2017 and April 2018 current law baselines, due to President Trump's Tax Cuts and Jobs Act and other spending bills.
- Comparing the CBO baseline as of January of a President's first year in office versus what actually happens thereafter is one way of measuring the impact of the President's policies or unforeseen economic events on deficits and debt.
