= Tube caddy =

Carrying case used for storing and transporting vacuum tubes

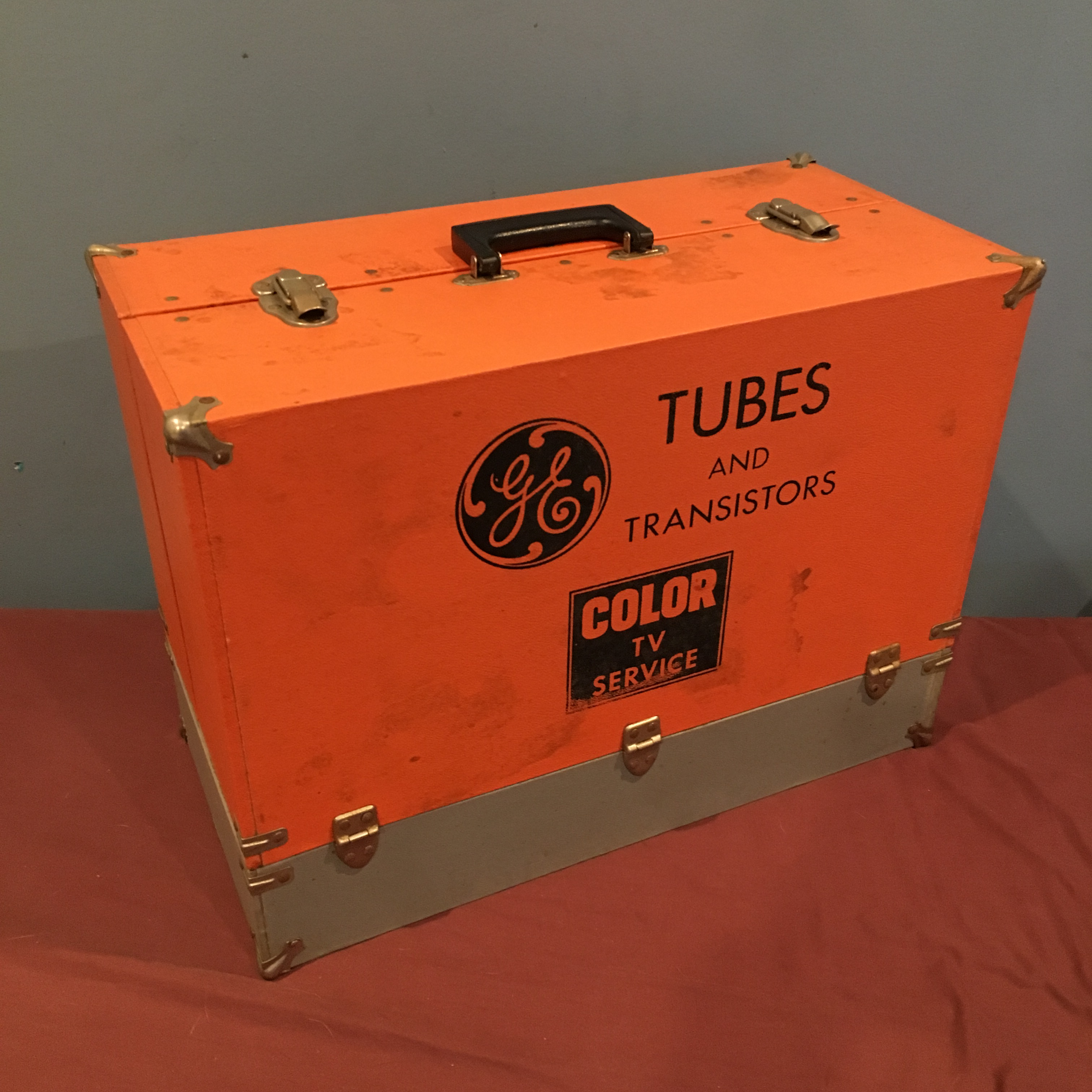

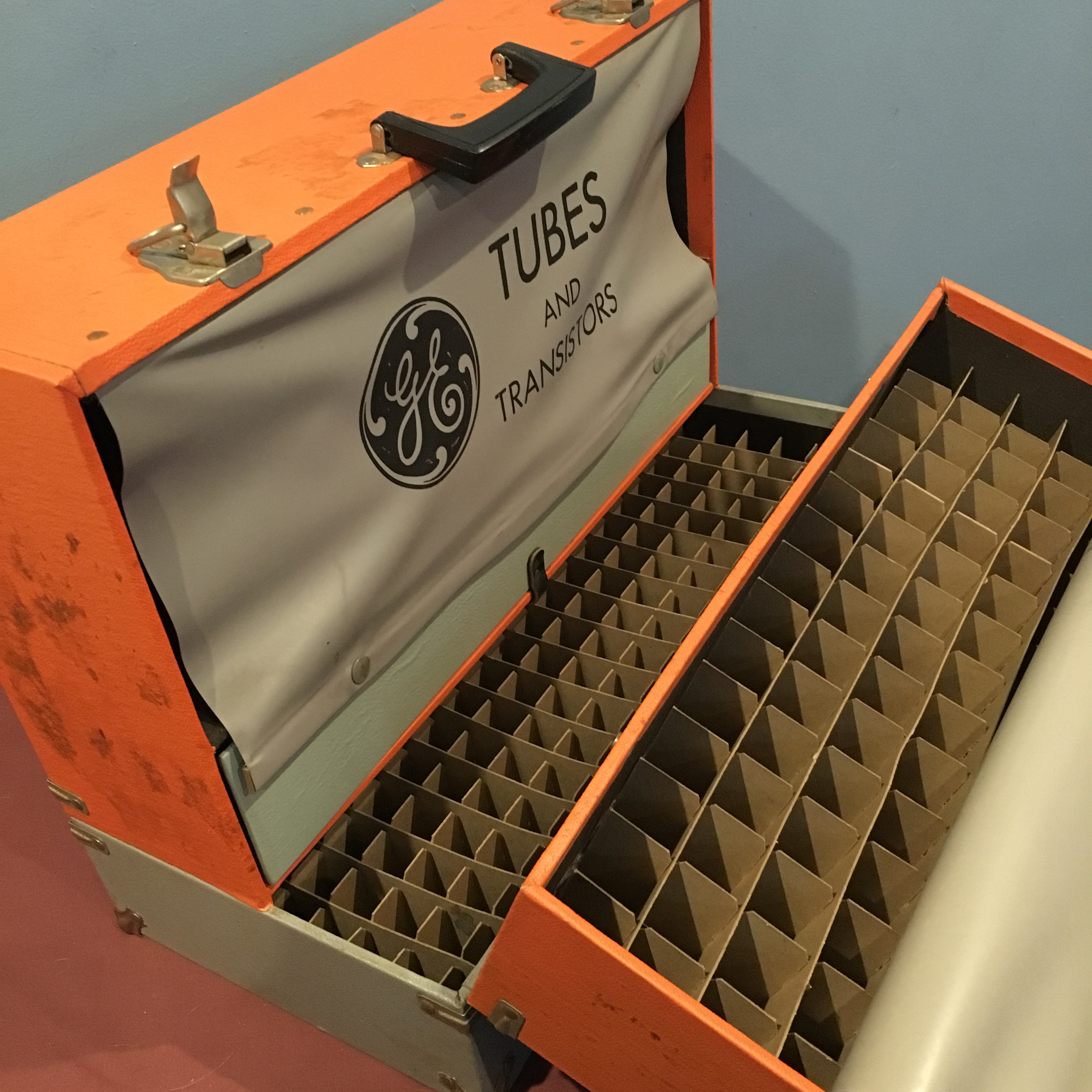
GE Tube Caddy with sections for standard sized and miniature tubes

A tube caddy or tube carrying case is a type of carrying case used for storing and transporting vacuum tubes. They were carried by repair technicians who performed home service calls in the days when radios and television sets were too large and heavy for the average homeowner to bring to a repair shop.

Caddies varied in size and shape, some resembling large briefcases with others resembling tool chests with drawers on the front. Typically they would have rows of square compartments that fit the individually boxed tubes, and often had larger compartments for other components or tools. Most of the space in the caddies was afforded to vacuum tubes (gas-filled tubes were also kept as needed) as most repairs could be effected with the replacement of tubes, with them being some of the few active components in electronic equipment of the time and often being made of glass with sensitive seals they were most likely to break, and were installed in sockets from which they were easy to remove. Some cases were available with built-in tube testers.

The use of tube caddies, along with home visits from repairmen, declined with the use of vacuum tubes themselves as televisions and radios became smaller and cheaper, eliminating a need for repair diagnoses from technicians.

== See also ==
- Vacuum tube reliability
- Tube tester; Self-service tube tester
