= Octal base =

Octal base may refer to:

- A vacuum tube socket with an eight-pin base
- The octal, or base-8, numeral system
