= Bogey value =

In manufacturers' specifications for electronic devices, a bogey device (or bogie device) - especially a vacuum tube- is a device that has all characteristics equal to the published values, in other words, that its parameters all lie in the centre of their bell curve distributions.

== Parameter value ==
A bogey is a published value for a parameter of an electronic component, such as a vacuum tube, that is average or typical of the devices that will be sold, and which the manufacturer is attempting to achieve. With manufacturing tolerances and variables in production, most devices produced do not exactly meet the bogey value for each parameter.

Apart from a bogey device being a theoretical device that has the given characteristics, the term can refer to a specially-selected example of a device (e.g. from a production run where care is taken to ensure each characteristic has its nominal value); for example a bogey tube could be used to calibrate tube testers and be expected to give readings in the middle of the meter's "good" region. Hence a tube can be specified by its bogey values and suitable tolerances, and tests are based on the bogey values. For applications such as music amplifiers where the channels need to have nearly identical performance, it is desirable that components are matched and have major parameter values close to bogey.
