= Top cap =

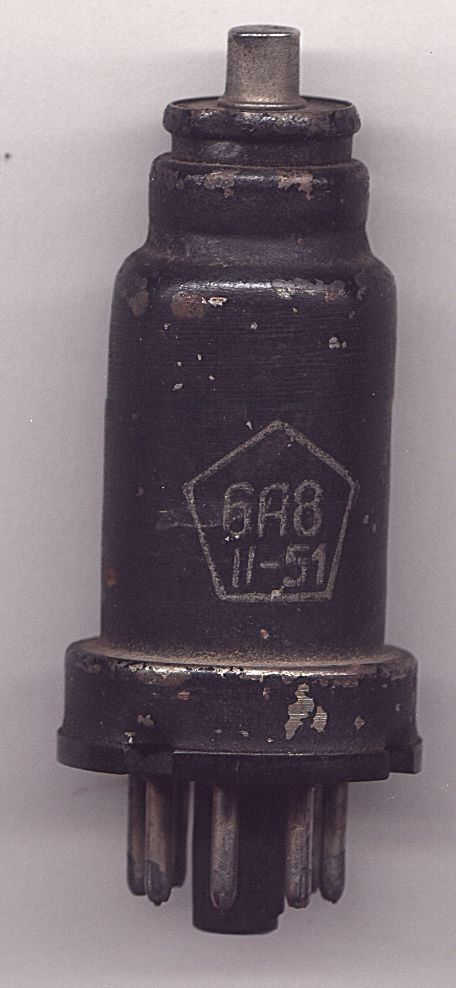
6A8 pentagrid converter with grid 4 on the top cap

In vacuum tube technology, a top cap is a terminal at the top of the tube envelope that connects one of the electrodes, the other electrodes being connected via the tube socket.

Top caps have most commonly been used for:

- Amplifier or similar tube control grid connection, to provide greater circuit stability by isolating the low-signal circuit from the rest of the tube connections.
- Anode connection, to isolate the high-tension circuit, allowing higher voltages to be used.
- Physical convenience. Grid top caps on frequency converters could be connected directly to an adjacent coil; Anode top caps on output tubes could be connected by flying leads directly to an output transformer. Shorter leads generally mean greater stability.

A few amplifier tubes used two top caps, symmetrically placed, one for anode and the other for grid.

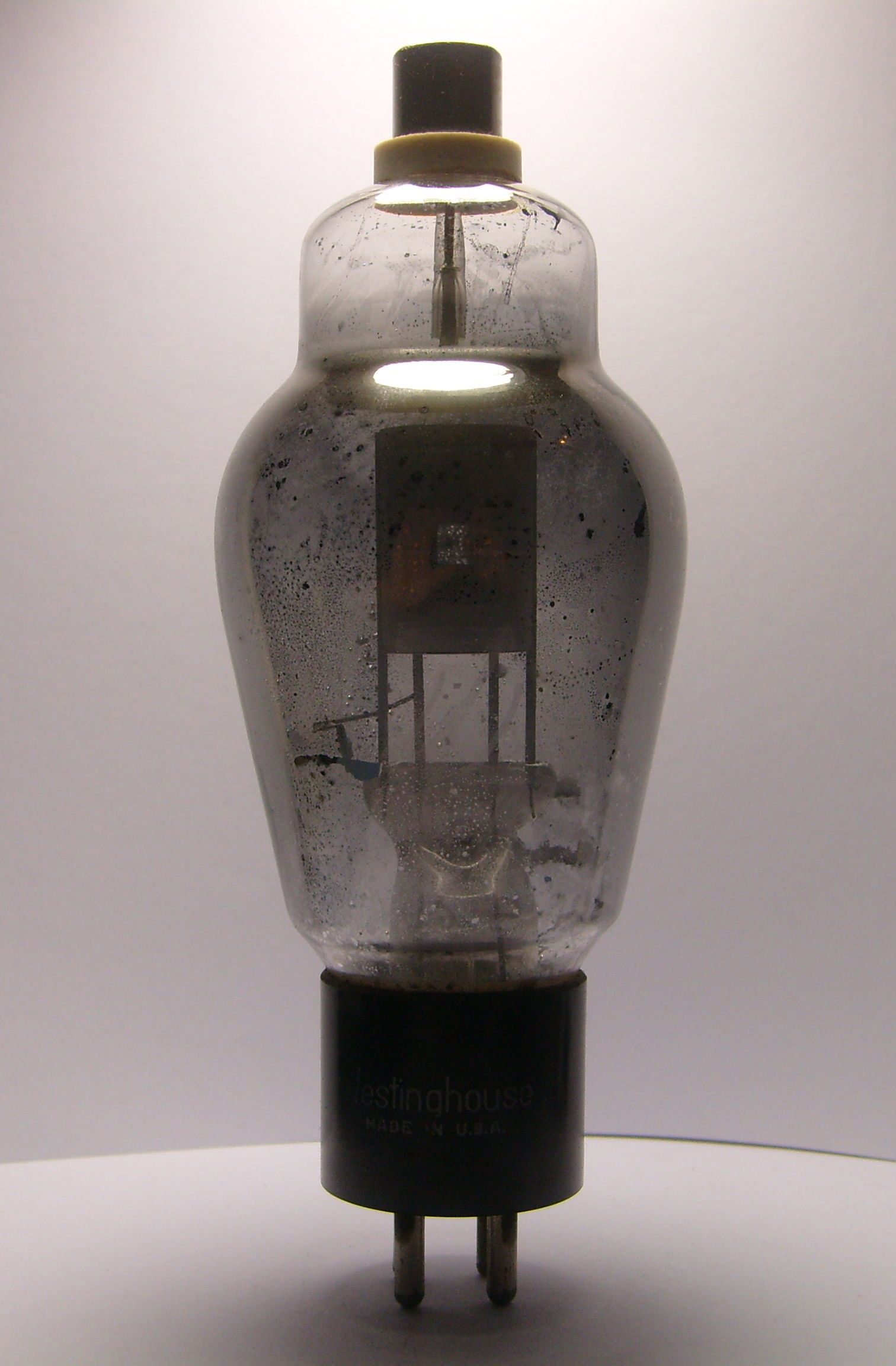
866 mercury rectifier with anode top cap

In audio amplifier tube application, the top cap was originally used for the grid connection, and a serviceman could apply a moist finger to the terminal to confirm that the stage and subsequent circuits were working by listening for the hum this produced in the loudspeaker. This practice led to accidents when anode top caps were first introduced to amplifier stages (they had been used on rectifiers for some time).
