= WD-11 =

Triode vacuum tube

The WD-11 vacuum tube, a triode, was introduced by the Westinghouse Electric corporation in 1922 for their Aeriola RF model radio and found use in other contemporary regenerative receivers (used as a detector-amplifier) including the Regenoflex and Radiola series.

The WD11 and "RCA-11" (and later simply named "11" by RCA and Philips/Miniwatt) have the following characteristics:

Socket:	UV4 (also known as WD-4-Pin)	
EIA/RETMA base diagram:	4F	
Description:	Detector Amplifier Triode	
Filament:	Directly heated 1.1 V	0.25 A
Plate (anode) voltage:	90 V	135 V maximum
Grid voltage:	−4.5 V	−10.5 V
Plate current	2.5 mA	3.0 mA
Plate resistance:	15.5 kΩ	15 kΩ
Amplification Factor (mu):	6.6	6.6
Transconductance (g_{m} or S):	0.425 mA/V	0.44 mA/V
Power output: (P_{o}):	0.007 W	0.04 W
Grid-plate Capacitance (C_{ga}):	3.3 pF	

== Drawbacks ==
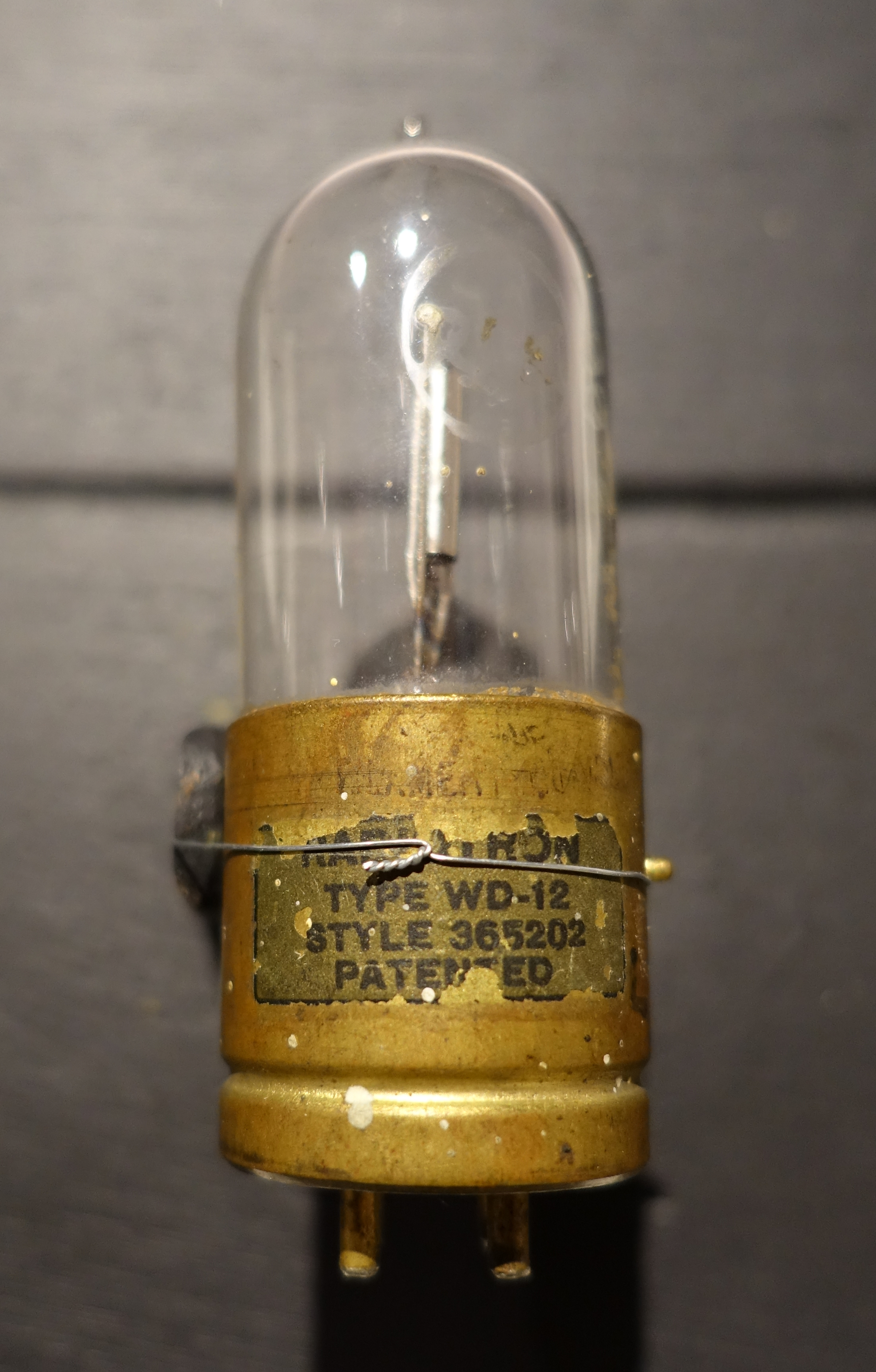
Westinghouse WD-12

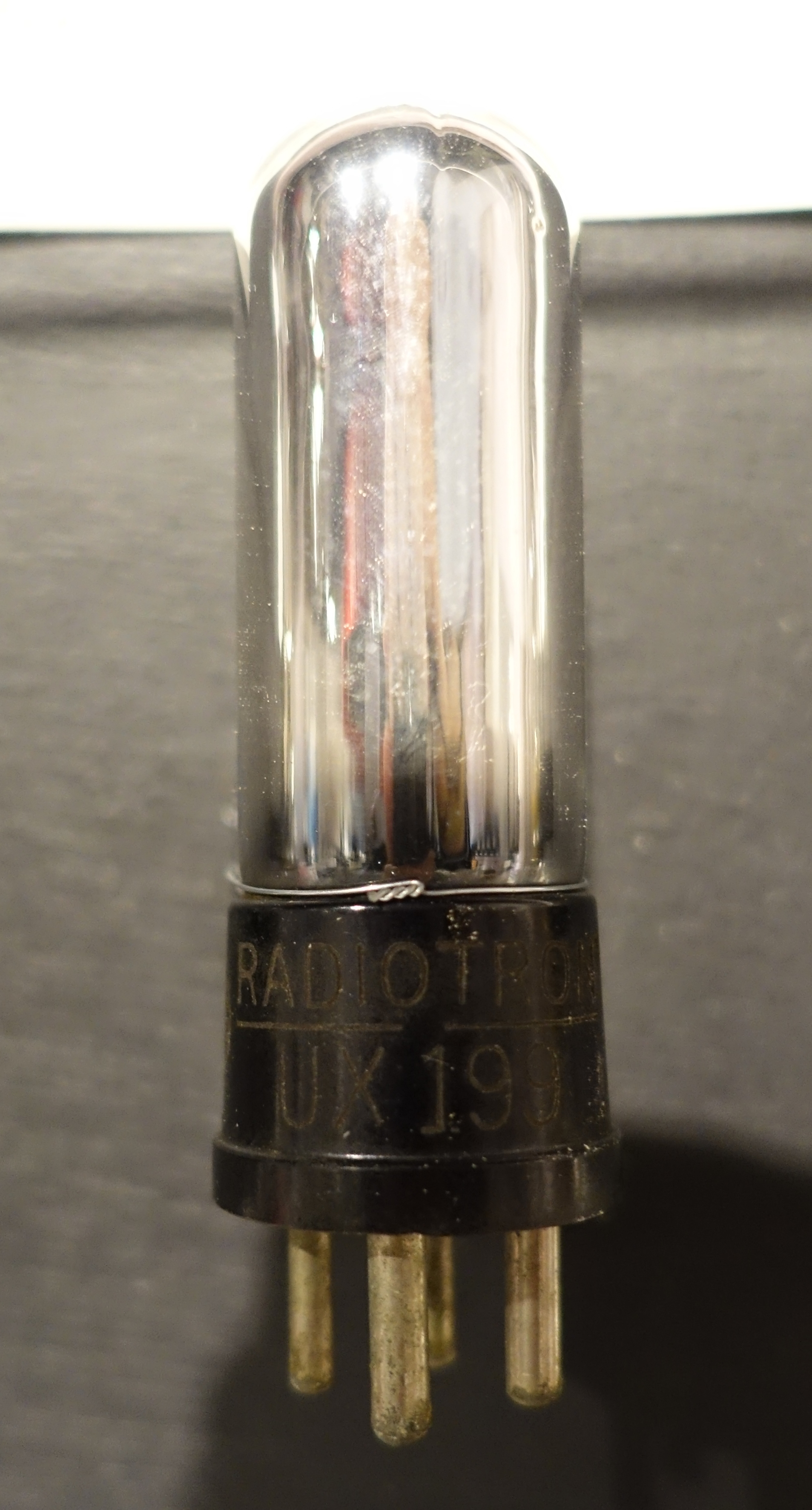
RCA UX-199

The design of the WD-11 is somewhat flawed. When the filament burns out, it has a tendency to contact the plate. This feeds high voltages back through the heater circuitry, subsequently burning out the filaments on the remaining tubes.

The WD-11 has a unique 4-pin base layout that was unlike any subsequent UV and UX style tube bases. It had 3 "small" pins and one "large" pin. Later UV based tubes relied on an index pin on the side of the tube base and UX tubes had 2 large and 2 small pins to ensure proper indexing.

It was replaced a year after its introduction by higher performance tubes which were less likely to encounter the filament shorting problem, Westinghouse Electric's WD-12 and General Electric's UX-199. No radios using the WD-11 tube were designed after 1924. RCA ceased production and issued a service bulletin describing how to retrofit existing sets to use the newer UX-199 triodes.

== Collectibility ==
Because of the rarity of the WD-11, it has become one of the most valuable vacuum tubes in the world. New-old-stock tubes have sold for as much as US$180 and used tubes have sold for over $100, more than the original price of the radios that use them. Collectors rarely use these tubes for fear of burning them out.

== Substitution ==
Sets that use the costly WD-11 and UV-199 tubes can be modified to use the inexpensive 1A5/GT octal power pentode by wiring a 5.1 ohm resistor between the pins of the filament and fabricating an octal-to-four pin adaptor. The pin for the 1A5's suppressor is left unconnected and the screen connected to the plate.

The type 12 (also known as RCA-12) is electrically identical to the type 11, but with a more common UX4 base.
