= 866A =

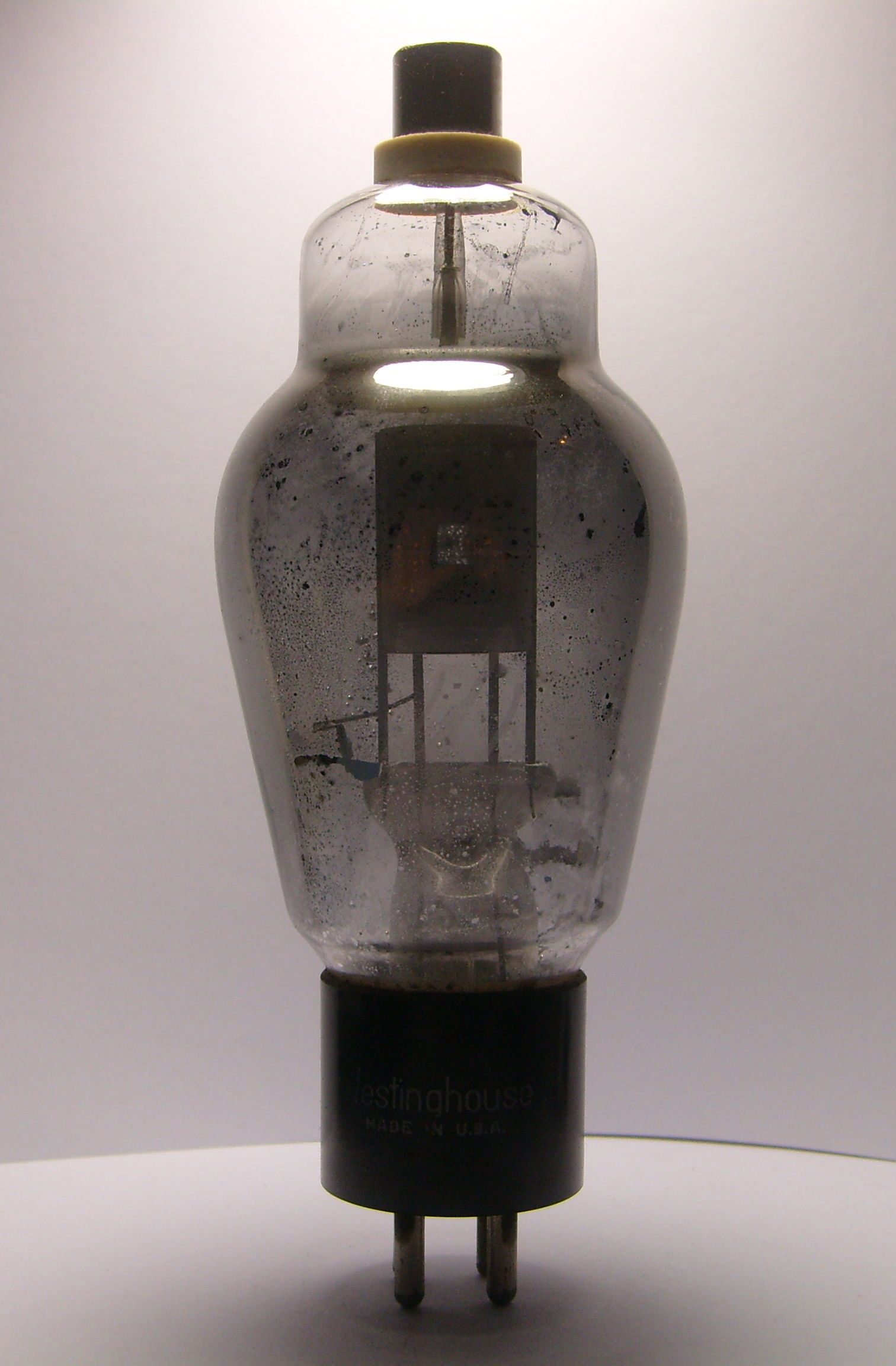
- Westinghouse 866A mercury vapor half-wave rectifier tube.
- Classification: Diode

Cathode
- Cathode type: Directly heated
- Heater voltage: 2.5 V
- Heater current: 5 A

Anode
- Max voltage: 5000
- Max current: 250 mA

References
- RCA Transmitting Tube Manual TT-3, 1940

The 866 is a mercury vapor half-wave rectifier intended for high-voltage applications. The voltage drop is approximately 15 volts up to 150 Hz. To avoid unwanted shorts the tube must be operated in a vertical position and the filament preheated for at least 30 seconds before applying the plate voltage.

== Construction ==
Structurally, it consists of a linear electrode arrangement; a cup shaped anode with top cap and a cylindrical cathode. The socket is a medium 4 pin bayonet UX-4 and the glass envelope is ST-19. The 2.5 volt/ 5 Amp filament is connected to pins 1 and 4.

== Operation ==
Under normal operating conditions the tube glows blue and mercury droplets are visible.

== Pictures in working conditions ==
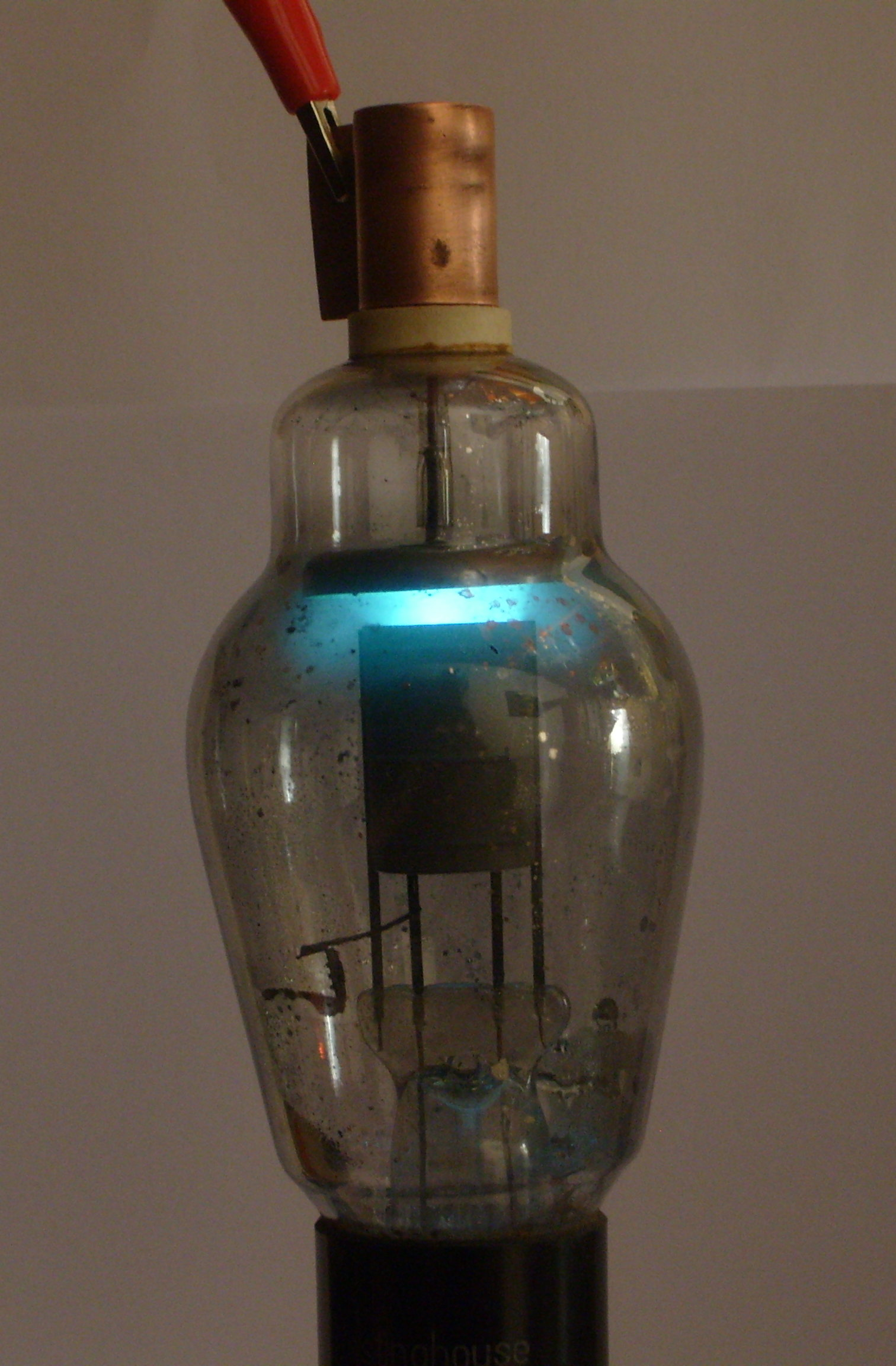
Westinghouse 866A mercury vapor half-wave rectifier tube. Glowing with 5mA

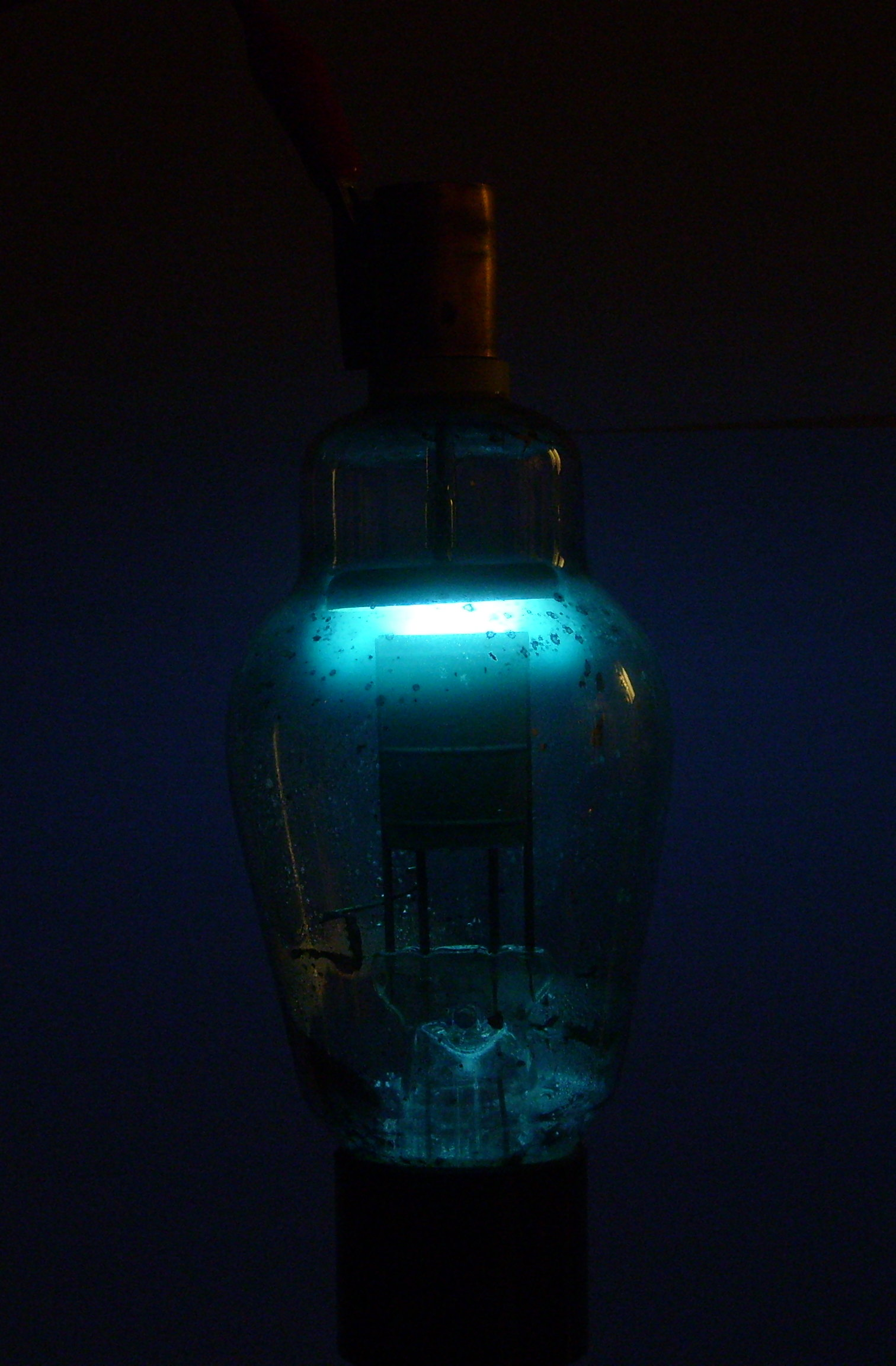
Westinghouse 866A mercury vapor half-wave rectifier tube. Glowing with 5mA in the dark (long exposure)

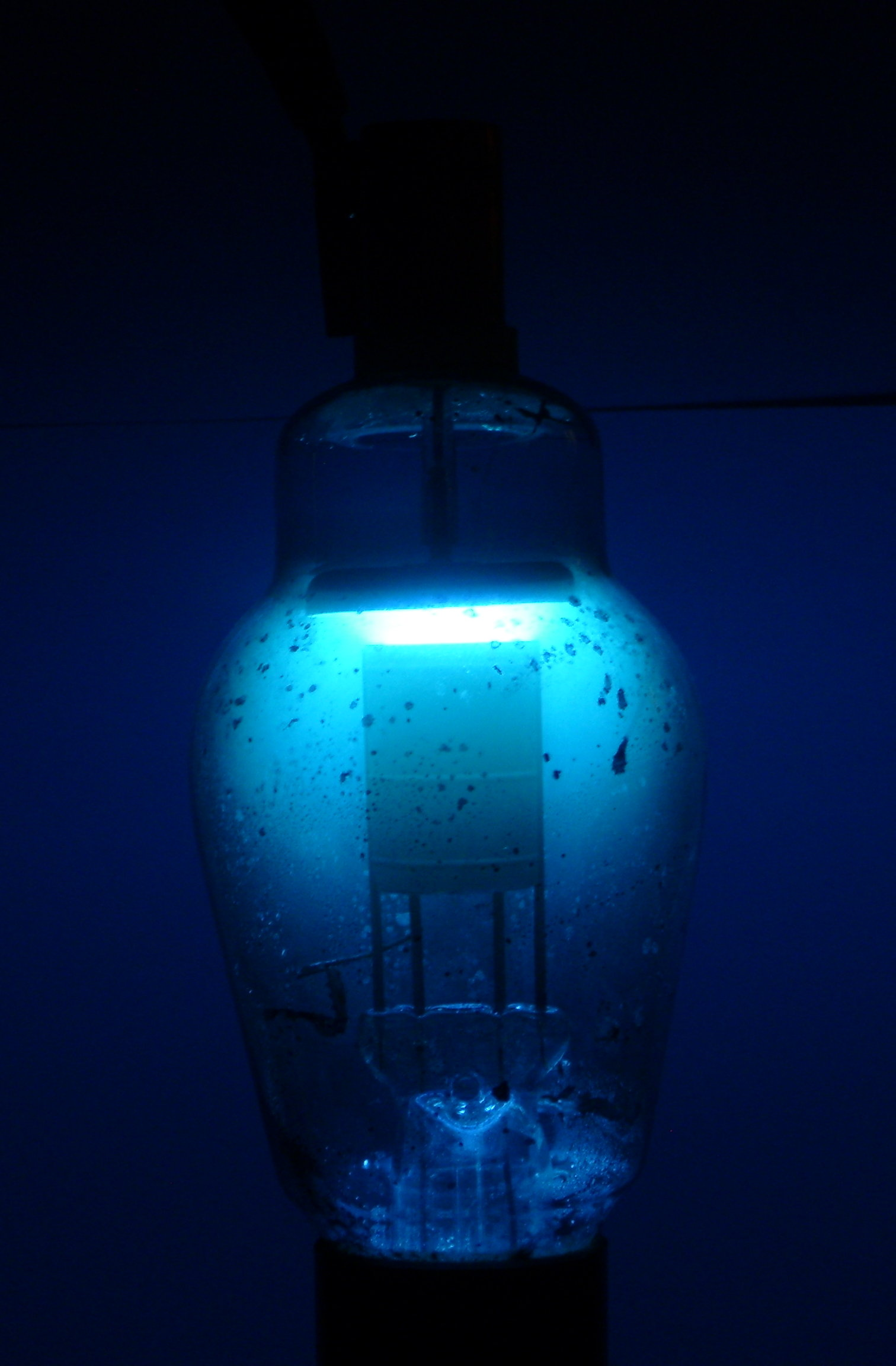
Westinghouse 866A mercury vapor half-wave rectifier tube. Glowing with 180mA in the dark.
