= Compactron =

Type of vacuum tube

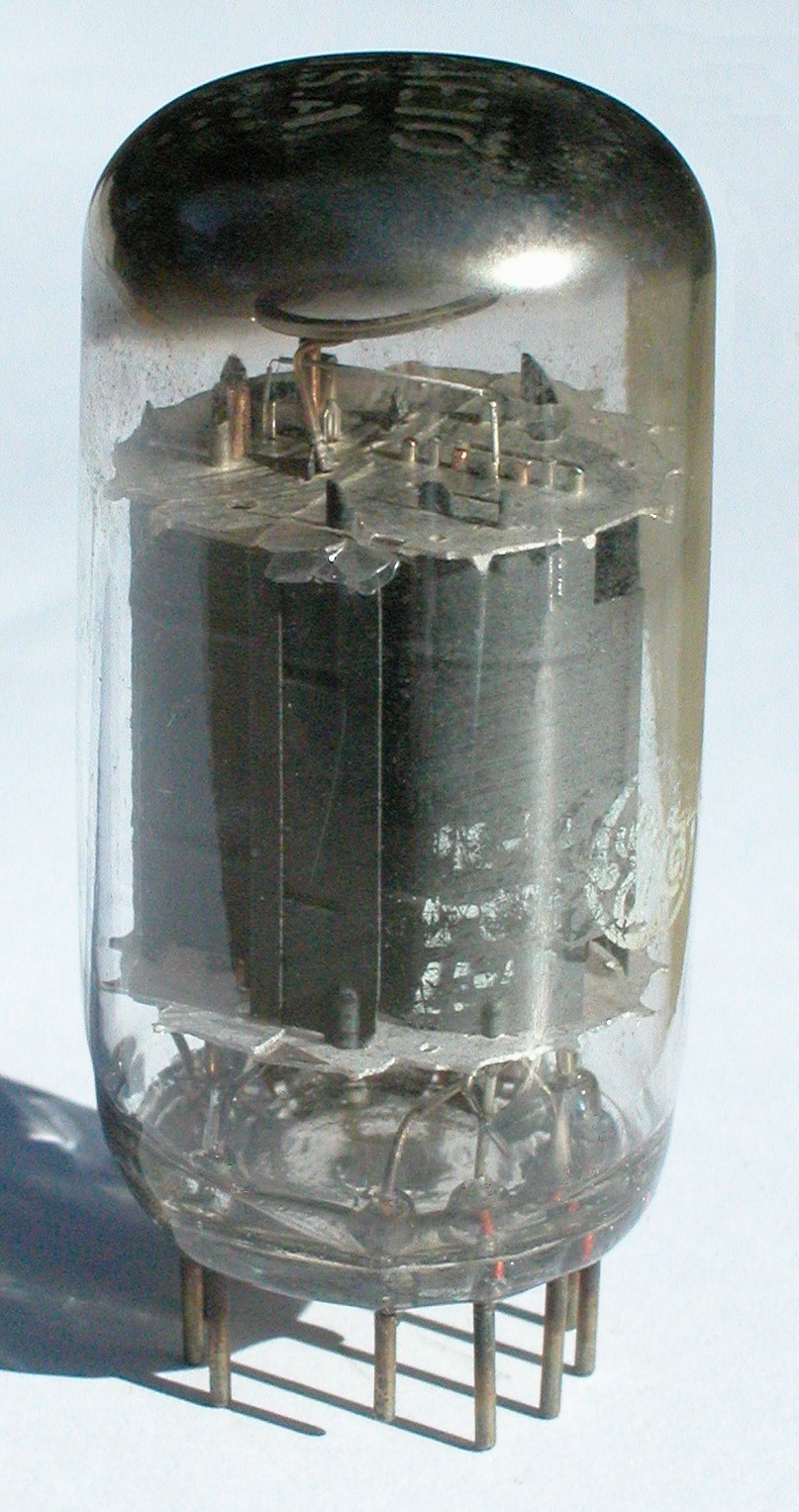
12AE10 Compactron tube (a dual pentode), made by GE

Compactrons are a type of vacuum tube, which contain multiple electrode structures packed into a single enclosure. They were designed to compete with early transistor electronics and were used in televisions, radios, and similar roles.

== History ==
The Compactron was a trade name applied to multi-electrode structure tubes specifically constructed on a 12-pin Duodecar base. This vacuum tube family was introduced in 1961 by General Electric in Owensboro, Kentucky to compete with transistorized electronics during the solid state transition. Television sets were a primary application. The idea of multi-electrode tubes itself was far from new and indeed the Loewe company of Germany was producing multi-electrode tubes as far back as 1926, and they even included all of the required passive components as well.

Use was prevalent in televisions because transistors were slow to achieve the high power and frequency capabilities needed particularly in color television sets. The first portable color television, the General Electric Porta-Color, was designed using 13 tubes, 10 of which were Compactrons. Even before the compactron design was unveiled, nearly all tube based electronic equipment used multi-electrode tubes of one type or another. Virtually every AM/FM radio receiver of the 1950s and 60's used a 6AK8 (EABC80) tube (or equivalent) consisting of three diodes and a triode which was designed in 1954.

Compactron's integrated valve design helped lower power consumption and heat generation (they were to tubes what integrated circuits were to transistors). Compactrons were also used in a few high end Hi-Fi stereos. They were also used by Ampeg and Fender in some of their guitar amplifiers. No modern tube based Hi-Fi systems are known to use this tube type, as simpler and more readily available tubes have again filled this niche. One tube, the 7868, is used in some Hi-Fi systems made today. This tube is a Novar tube. It has the same physical dimensions as the compactron, but a 9 pin base. The exhaust tip is on the top or bottom of the tube, depending on the manufacturer's preference. It is currently in production by Electro-Harmonix.(The new power amp, Linear Tube Audio's Ultralinear, uses 4 17JN6 compactron tubes as the power tube in the amp.) The amp generates 20 watts of power with these inexpensive TV tubes.

== Notable features ==
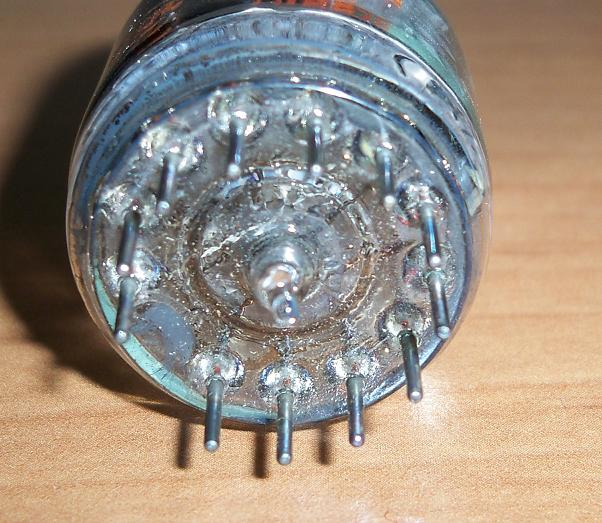
The evacuation tip is in the center of the circular pin pattern.

A distinguishing feature of most Compactrons is the placement of the evacuation tip on the bottom end, rather than the top end as was customary with "miniature" tubes, and a characteristic 3/4" diameter circle pin pattern.

- Most Compactrons ranged in glass envelope diameter from 28 to 70 mm depending upon the internal configuration. Variations of the Compactron design were made by Sylvania and by some Japanese firms.

== Examples ==
Examples of Compactrons type types include:

- 6AG11 double diode similar to 6AL5, double triode high-mu similar to 12AT7. Designed for FM stereo multiplex service.
- 6BK11 triple triode. Two of the triodes are similar to 12AX7 and one of them is similar to 5751.
- 6C10 high-mu triple triode, all three being similar to 12AX7, used for audio amplifiers, and as color matrix amplifiers in television by Sylvania, etc.... not related to the Edison Swan (later Mazda) 6C10 triode-hexode
- 6M11 twin triode - pentode. Designed for sync separators and AGC amplifier circuits.
- 6K11 triple triode. Designed for sync separators and AGC amplifier circuits.
- 6LF6 beam power pentode with anode cap. Designed for horizontal output service.
- 8B10 twin triode - twin diode. Designed for horizontal phase detector service, and horizontal oscillator service.
- 12AE10 twin pentode. Designed for FM discriminator/detector, and audio output.
- 38HK7 pentode diode. Designed for horizontal output service and as a damper diode
- 1AD2 diode high voltage, used in flyback transformer rectification

Due to their specific applications in television circuits, many different Compactron types were produced. Almost all were assigned using standard US tube numbers.

== Technological obsolescence ==
Integrated circuits (of the analogue and digital type) gradually took over all of the functions that the Compactron was designed for. "Hybrid" television sets produced in the early to mid-1970s made use of a combination of tubes (typically Compactrons), transistors, and integrated circuits in the same set. By the mid-1980s this type of tube was functionally obsolete. Compactrons simply don't exist in any TV sets designed after 1986. Other specialist uses of the tube declined in parallel with the television set manufacture. Manufacture of Compactrons ceased in the early 1990s. New old stock replacements for almost all Compactron types produced are easily found for sale on the Internet.
