= Fernico =

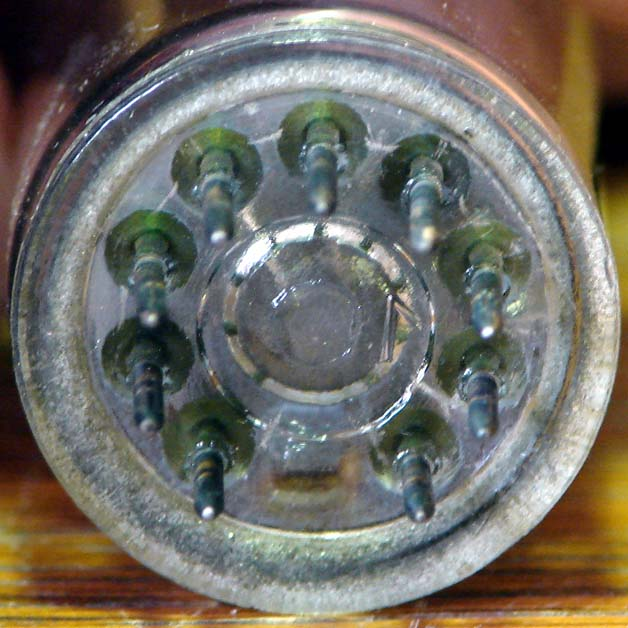
Fernico pins on the base of a vacuum tube, designed for a tube socket

Fernico describes a family of metal alloys made primarily of iron, nickel and cobalt. The family includes Kovar, FerNiCo I, FerNiCo II, and Dumet. The name is made up of the chemical symbols of its constituent three elements. "Dumet" is a portmanteau of "dual" and "metal," because it is a heterogeneous alloy, usually fabricated in the form of a wire with an alloy core and a copper cladding. These alloys possess the properties of electrical conductivity, minimal oxidation and formation of porous surfaces at working temperatures of glass and thermal coefficients of expansion which match glass closely. These requirements allow the alloys to be used in glass seals, such that the seal does not crack, fracture or leak with changes in temperature.

Dumet is most commonly used in seals where lead-in wires pass through the glass bulb wall of standard household electric lamps (light bulbs) among other things.

The two Fernico alloys both consist of iron (Fe), nickel (Ni), and cobalt (Co). Fernico I is used at high temperatures (20 to 800 °C) and is identical to Kovar. Fernico II is used at cryogenic temperatures in the -80 .. -180 °C range. Both are used to create electrically conductive paths through the walls of sealed borosilicate glass containers. Dumet is used for a similar purpose, but is tailored for seals through soda lime and lead alkali silicate glasses.

These alloys adhere to lead-tin, tin, and silver solders. Other metals, including copper, molybdenum, nickel, and steel can be spot-welded to the FerNiCo alloys forming low resistance electrical connections.

== Typical compositions ==
Given in weight %

	Fe	Ni	Co	C	Si	Mn
FerNiCo I/Kovar	balance	29%	17%	<0.01%	0.2%	0.3%
FerNiCo II	balance	31%	15%	<0.01%	0.2%	0.3%
Dumet Core	58%	42%	-	-	-	-

FerNiCo I has the same linear coefficient of expansion as certain types of borosilicate ("hard") glass, c6.5 × 10^{−6}K^{−1}, thus serving as an ideal material for the lead-out wires or other seal structures in light bulbs and thermionic valves. Dumet is also used for this purpose, but for passing through softer soda-lime and lead-alkali glasses. This wire is often coated with a glass-like film of sodium metaborate, (NaBO_{2}), so the molten glass will "wet" and adhere to it. 25% by mass of the finished wire is copper. Cunife exhibits a similar property.

== Uses ==
There are very few uses of Fernico. Some of them are:

- It is used to seal metals and glass.
- It is often used in the form of nanopowder.

== See also ==
- Copper-clad aluminium wire
