= EF86 =

Vacuum tube for audio applications

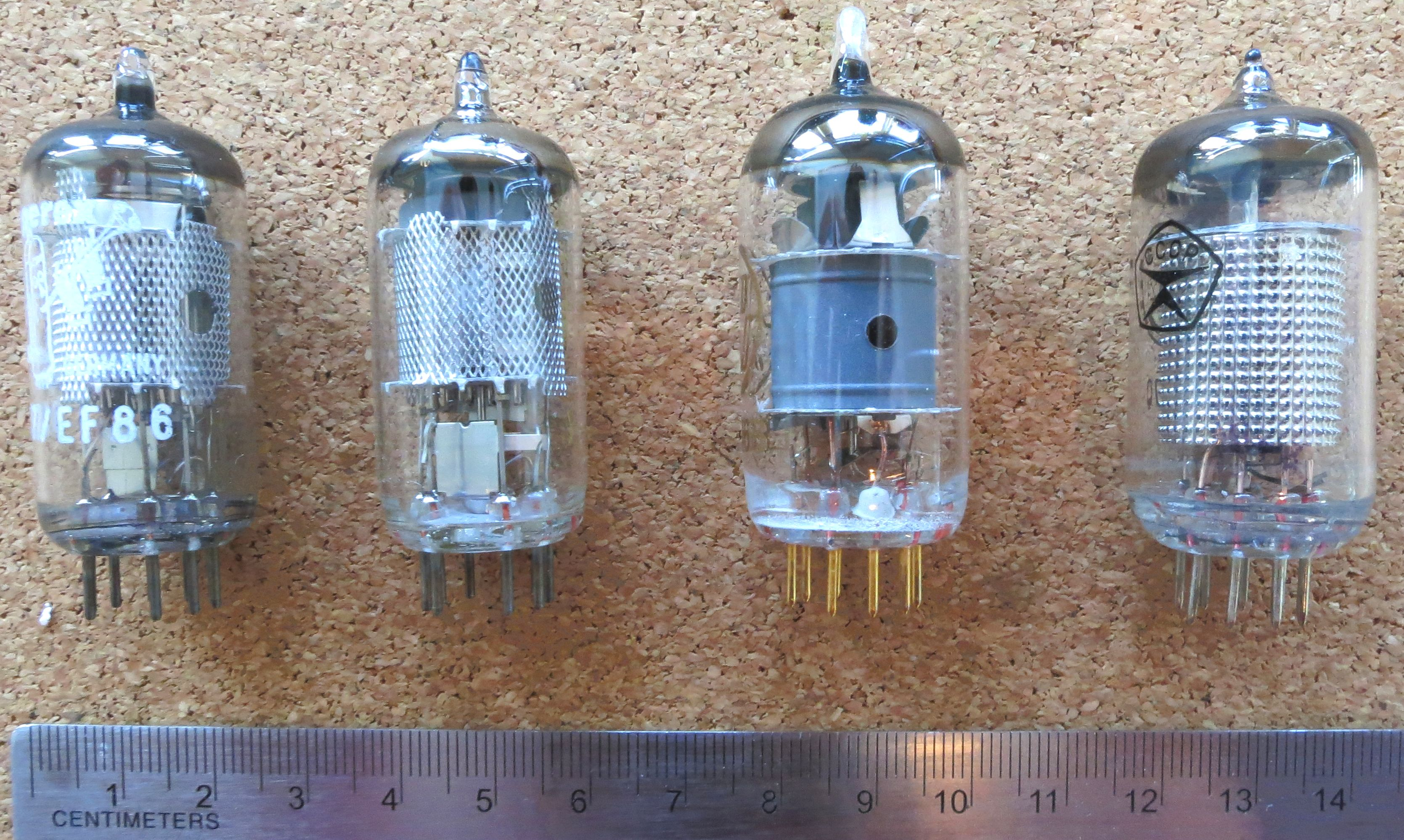
- Four EF86-type tubes
- Classification: Pentode
- Service: Audio frequency

Cathode
- Cathode type: Indirectly heated
- Filament voltage: 6.3 V RMS or dc
- Filament current: 200 mA

Anode
- Max dissipation Watts: 1 W
- Max current: 6 mA

Socket connections
- B9A

Typical class-A amplifier operation
- Amplification factor: 185 (45dB)
- Screen voltage: 200 V

The EF86 is a high transconductance sharp cutoff pentode vacuum tube with Noval (B9A) base for audio-frequency applications.

It was introduced by the Mullard company in 1953 and was produced by Philips, Mullard, Telefunken, Valvo, and GEC among others. It is very similar electrically to the octal base EF37A and the Rimlock base EF40. Unlike many pentodes, it was designed specifically for audio applications, with low noise and low microphony claimed advantages, although a rubber-mounted vibration-resistant base was still recommended. It has a much higher stage gain than any triode, which makes it susceptible to microphony. The EF86 was used in many preamplifier designs during the last decades of vacuum tube hi-fi development. An industrial tube variant is known as 6267. In the former Soviet Union a variant was also produced as type 6Zh32P (Russian: 6Ж32П.) As of 2012 EF86s were being produced in Russia in two versions under the Electro-Harmonix brand and in the Slovak Republic as JJ Electronic (formerly Tesla).

== Characteristics ==
6.3 Volt, 200 mA indirectly heated A.F. miniature pentode with Noval (B9A) base with an EIA 9CQ (or 9BJ) basing diagram.

- Transconductance: 2.2 mA/V at I_{a}=3.0 mA, I_{g2}=0.6 mA, V_{a}=250 V, V_{g1}=-2.2 V, V_{g2}=140 V, V_{g3}=0 V
- Voltage gain: 185 (45dB) at V_{supply}=250 V, I_{k}=0.9 mA, R_{k}=2.2 kilohm, R_{a}=220 kilohm, R_{g1}=1 megohm, Vout<44 V_{RMS}

Special precautions have been taken in the design to reduce the:

- Hum (through a bifilar-wound twisted pair of heater wires),
- noise, and
- microphony (through a rigid internal structure to reduce resonances).

The EF86 is much less noisy than other pentodes, but slightly noisier than some triodes at about 2 μV equivalent input noise to 10 kHz. Although used in circuits such as tape recorder input stages and instrument amplifiers, microphony can be a problem, even when mounted in a vibration-reducing valve holder.

== Equivalent and similar devices ==
- 6267 * Z729 * CV2901 * 6BK8 * 6CF8 * 6F22 * CV8068 * CV10098

Special quality:

- EF86SQ * M8195 * CV4085 * EF806S

Different heater requirements:

- PF86, 300 mA (4.5 V)
- UF86, 100 mA (12.6 V)

The rarely used EF83 is a remote-cutoff pentode otherwise similar to the EF86; the remote cutoff (variable mu) makes it suitable for applications such as automatic gain control (AGC) in tape recorders.
