= Kovar =

Nickel–cobalt ferrous alloy

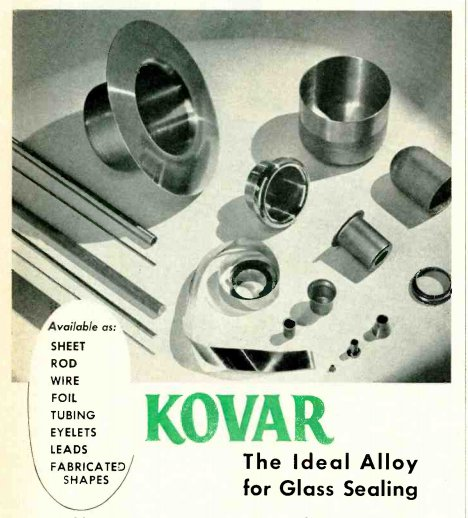
Assortment of Kovar metal shapes from an advertisement in a 1950 electronics magazine

Kovar (trademark of CRS Holdings, inc., Delaware) is a nickel–cobalt ferrous alloy compositionally identical to Fernico 1, designed to have substantially the same thermal expansion characteristics as borosilicate glass (≈5 ppm/K between 30 and 200 °C, to ≈10 ppm/K at 800 °C) to allow a tight mechanical joint between the two materials over a range of temperatures. It finds application in glass-to-metal seals in scientific apparatus, and conductors entering glass envelopes of electronic parts such as vacuum tubes (valves), X-ray and microwave tubes and some lightbulbs.

Kovar was invented to meet the need for a reliable glass-to-metal seal, which is required in electronic devices such as light bulbs, vacuum tubes, cathode-ray tubes, and in vacuum systems in chemistry and other scientific research. Most metals cannot seal to glass because their coefficient of thermal expansion is not the same as glass; as the joint cools after fabrication the stresses due to the different expansion rates of the glass and metal cause the joint to crack.

Kovar not only has thermal expansion similar to glass, but its nonlinear thermal expansion curve can often be made to match a glass, thus allowing the joint to tolerate a wide temperature range. Chemically, it bonds to glass via the intermediate oxide layer of nickel(II) oxide and cobalt(II) oxide. The proportion of iron oxide is low due to its reduction by cobalt. The bond strength is highly dependent on the oxide layer thickness and character. The presence of cobalt makes the oxide layer easier to melt and dissolve in the molten glass. A grey, grey-blue or grey-brown color indicates a good seal. A metallic color indicates lack of oxide, while black color indicates overly oxidized metal, in both cases leading to a weak joint.

The name Kovar is often used as a general term for Fe–Ni alloys with these particular thermal expansion properties. The related particular Fe–Ni alloy Invar exhibits minimum thermal expansion.

== Typical composition ==
Given in percentages of weight.

Fe	Ni	Co	C	Si	Mn
balance	29%	17%	< 0.01%	0.2%	0.3%

== Properties ==
Property	sintered	HIPed
Density g /cm^{3}	8.0	8.35
Hardness / HV1	160	150
Young's Modulus / GPa	138	
reduction of area at fracture / %	30	
yield strength / MPa	270	
thermal conductivity / W/K∙m	17	
Curie Temperature / °C	435	
electrical resistivity Ω mm^{2} / m	0.49	
specific heat J/g∙K	0.46	
thermal expansion coefficient/10^{−6} / K (25–200 °C)	5.5	
(25–300 °C)	5.1	
(25–400 °C)	4.9	
(25–450 °C)	5.3	
(25–500 °C)	6.2	
