= Tube tester =

Electronic instrument

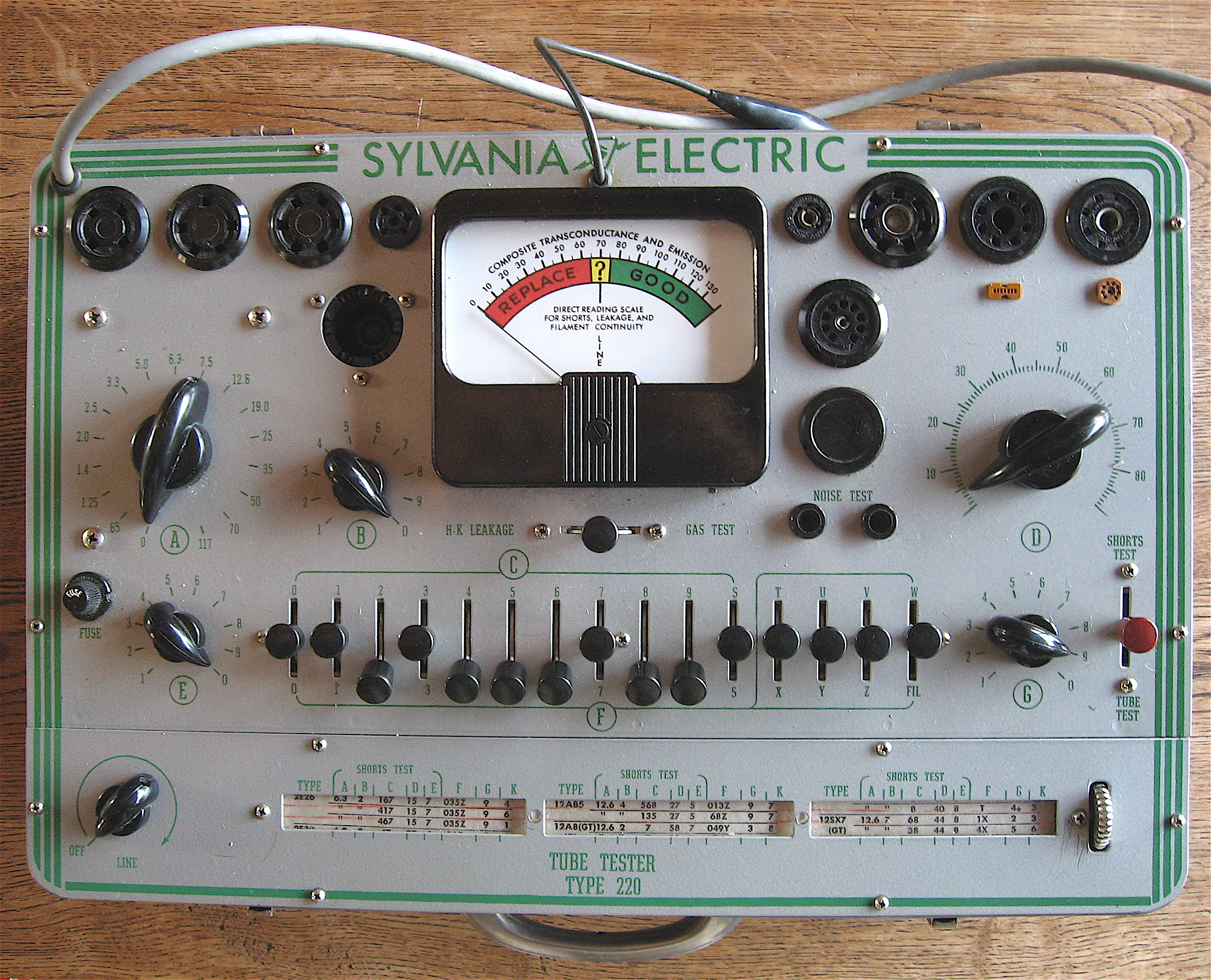
A "Sylvania Electric" multimeter tester for vacuum tubes

A tube tester is an electronic instrument designed to test certain characteristics of vacuum tubes (thermionic valves). Tube testers evolved along with the vacuum tube to satisfy the demands of the time, and their evolution ended with the tube era. The first tube testers were simple units designed for specific tubes to be used in the battlefields of World War I by radio operators, so they could easily test the tubes of their communication equipment.

== Types of tube testers ==
=== Modern testers ===
The most modern testers perform a multitude of the below tests and are fully automated. Examples of modern testers include the Amplitrex AT1000, the Space-Tech Lab AudioTubeTester, the Maxi pre-amp tester and the maxi-matcher (power tubes only) by maxi test and the new, and somewhat more primitive, DIVO VT1000 by Orange Amplification. While the AT1000, AudioTubeTester and the Maxi-test brand testers offer precise measurements of transconductance/Gm and emissions/iP at full or near-full voltages, the Orange tester offers a very simple numerical quality scale. The AudioTubeTester has a unique feature of quick tube matching +/- percentage display.

=== Filament continuity tester ===
The simplest tester is the filament continuity tester, usually with a neon lamp connected in series with the filament/heater and a current limiting resistance fed directly by the mains. There is therefore no need to select the appropriate filament voltage for the particular tube under test, but this equipment will not identify tubes that may be faulty in other (more likely) ways, nor indicate any degree of wear. The same checks can be made with a cheap multimeter's resistance test.

=== Tube checker ===
The tube checker is the second-simplest of all tube testers after filament continuity testing. Tubes are used as a low power rectifier, with all elements other than filament connections connected together as the anode, at a fraction of its normal emission. By mistake referred to sometimes as Emission Tester because they are a crude measure of emission in directly heated types (but a measure of unwanted heater-cathode leakage in indirectly heated types). Switches will need to select the correct filament voltage and pins.

=== Emission tester ===
Next in complexity is the emission tester, which basically treats any tube as a diode by carefully connecting the cathode to ground, all the grids and plate to B+ voltage, feeding the filament with the correct voltage, and an ammeter in series with either the plate or the cathode. This effectively measures emission, the current which the cathode is capable of emitting, for the given plate voltage, which can usually be controlled by a variable load resistor. Switches will need to select the correct filament voltage plus which pins belong to the filament and cathode(s).

Older testers may call themselves Plate Conductance if the ammeter is in series with the plate, or Cathode Conductance if the meter is in series with the cathode.

The problems of emission testers are:

- they do not measure key characteristics of tubes, like transconductance
- they do not perform the tests at real load, voltages and currents
- they test the tube under static conditions, which are not even near the dynamic conditions the tube would work with in a real electronic device
- tubes with grids might not even show the real emission because of hot spots in the cathode, hidden by the grids under normal conditions
- grids will be forward biased to some extent - some fine control grid wires are limited in their ability to withstand this
- the amount of current that should be considered "100%" has to be known and documented for each tube type (and will be different for different emission test circuit details)

The advantage of an emission tester is that from all types of tube testers, it provides the most reliable warning of tube wear-out. If emission is at 70%, transconductance can be at 90% still, and gain at 100%. The best and most popular version used by the German army was the Funke W19 .

The disadvantage of an emission tester is that it can test a good tube as bad, and a bad tube as good, because it ignores other properties of the tube. A tube with low emission will work perfectly fine in most circuits, and need not be replaced on that indication alone, unless it measures much lower than specified or if it indicates a short.

A variation on the emission tester is the dynamic conductance tester, a type of tester developed by the Jackson Electrical Company of Dayton, Ohio. The main difference is the use of ‘proportional AC voltages’ in place of applying the current directly to the grids and plate.

=== Short circuit test ===
Usually, emission testers also have a short circuit test which is just a variation of the continuity tester with a neon lamp, and which allows to identify if there is any shortcut between the different pairs of electrodes.

=== Parametric tester ===
A tester of this type applies DC voltage to the tube being tested, and datasheet values are verified under real conditions. Some parametric testers apply AC voltage to the tube being tested, with verification under conditions which simulate DC operation. Examples include the AVO line of tube testers, along with the Funke W20 and the Neuberger RPG375.

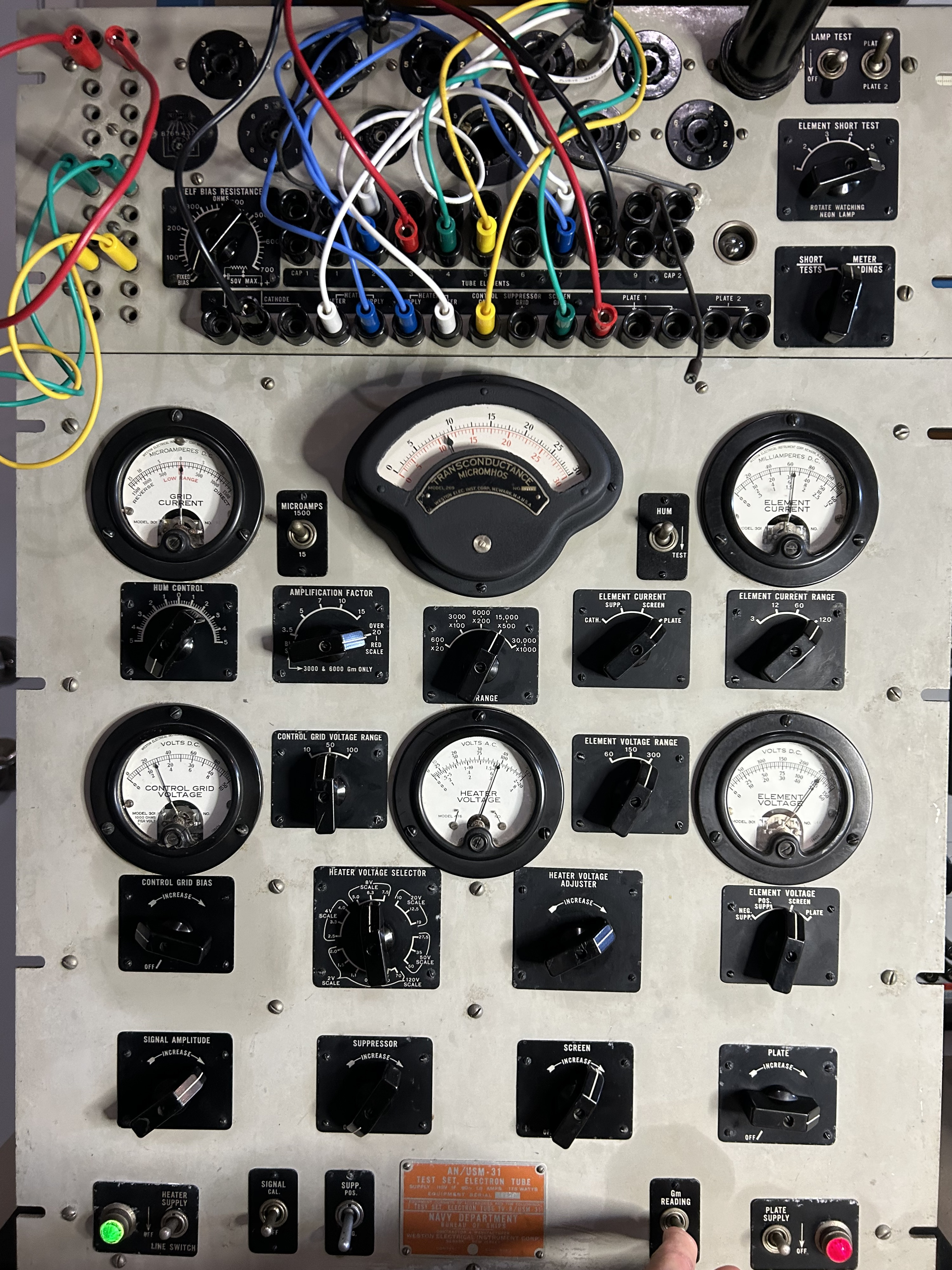
Weston TV-8/USM31/686 parametric tube tester, testing a 6L6

=== Mutual conductance tester ===
The mutual conductance tester tests the tube dynamically by applying bias and an AC voltage to the control grid, and measuring the current obtained on the plate, while maintaining the correct DC voltages on the plate and screen grid. This setup measures the transconductance of the tube, indicated in micromhos.

=== Oscilloscope tube curve tracer plug-in ===
A full set of characteristic curves for vacuum tubes, and later for semiconductor devices, could be displayed on an oscilloscope screen by use of a plug-in adapter, or on a dedicated curve tracer. An example is the Tektronix 570.

== Self-service tube testers ==
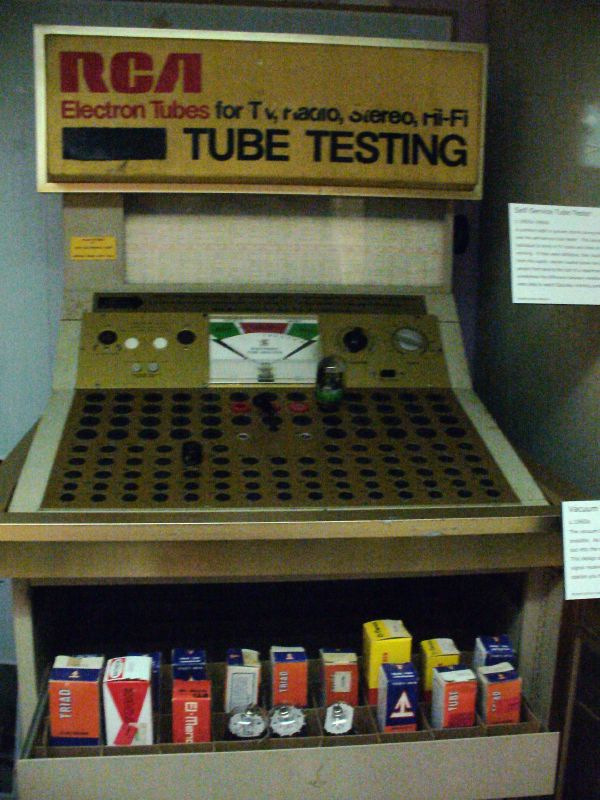
An RCA self-service tube tester on display at the Oklahoma History Center

From the late 1920s until the early 1970s, many department stores, drug stores and grocery stores in the U.S. had self-service tube-vending displays. They typically consisted of a tube tester atop a locked cabinet of tubes, with a flip chart of instructions. One would remove the tubes from a malfunctioning device, such as a radio or television, bring them to the store, and test them all, looking up the instructions from the part number on the tube and the flip chart. If a tube was defective, store personnel would sell a replacement from the cabinet.

At that time, tubes in consumer devices were installed in sockets and were easily replaceable, except for the CRT in televisions. Devices typically had a removable back with a diagram showing where to replace each tube. There were only a few types of tube socket; a radio or television set would have multiple identical sockets, so it was easy to mistakenly exchange tubes with different functions, but similar bases, between two different sockets. If testing showed all tubes to be working, the next step was a repair shop. As transistorized devices took over the market, the grocery-store tube-tester vanished.

== See also ==
- Transistor tester
- Tube socket
- Bogey value
