= Budget Act =

Budget Act or budget act may refer to various budget acts and budgetary policies:

== By location ==
=== Australia ===
- Various Australian federal budget acts

=== Canada ===
- Various Canadian federal budget acts

=== France ===
- Various French budget acts

=== Germany ===
- Various German federal budget acts

=== India ===
- Various Indian union budget acts
- Fiscal Responsibility and Budget Management Act, 2003

=== Norway ===
- Various Norwegian state budget acts

=== Russia ===
- Various Russian federal budget acts

=== Scotland ===
- Various Scottish budget acts

=== Switzerland ===
- Various Swiss federal budget acts

=== United Kingdom ===
- Various United Kingdom budget acts
- Budget Responsibility and National Audit Act 2011

=== United States ===
- Various United States federal budget acts
- Budget and Accounting Act
- Consolidated Omnibus Budget Reconciliation Act of 1985
- Gramm–Rudman–Hollings Balanced Budget Act
- Omnibus Budget Reconciliation Act of 1987
- Budget Enforcement Act of 1990
- Omnibus Budget Reconciliation Act of 1990
- Omnibus Budget Reconciliation Act of 1993
- Balanced Budget Act of 1997
- Budget Control Act of 2011
- Medicare, Medicaid, and SCHIP Balanced Budget Refinement Act of 1999
- No Budget, No Pay Act

== See also ==
- Balanced budget
- Standard budget
- Personal budget
- Operating budget
- Unified budget
- Budget process
