= Direct materials cost =

Cost of the materials in a product

Direct materials cost the cost of direct materials which can be easily identified with the unit of production. For example, the cost of glass is a direct materials cost in light bulb manufacturing.

The manufacture of products or goods requires material as the prime element. In general, these materials are divided into two categories. These categories are direct materials and indirect materials.

Direct materials are also called productive materials, raw materials, raw stock, stores and only materials without any descriptive title.

== See also ==
- Variance analysis (accounting)
- Direct material total variance
- Direct material price variance
- Direct material usage variance
