= Direct material usage variance =

In variance analysis, direct material usage (efficiency, quantity) variance is the difference between the standard quantity of materials that should have been used for the number of units actually produced, and the actual quantity of materials used, valued at the standard cost per unit of material. It is one of the two components (the other is direct material price variance) of direct material total variance.

== Example ==
Let us assume that standard direct material cost of widget is as follows:

2 kg of unobtainium at € 60 per kg ( = € 120 per unit).

Let us assume further that during given period, 100 widgets were manufactured, using 212 kg of unobtainium which cost €13,144.

Under those assumptions direct material usage variance can be calculated as:

100 units should have used (× 2 kg)	200	kg
but did use	212	kg
Usage variance in kg	12	kg A
× standard cost per kg	× € 60
Usage variance in €	€ 720	(A)

Direct material usage variance can be reconciled to direct material total variance by way of direct material price variance:

Direct material usage variance	€ 720	(A)
Direct material price variance	€ 424	(A)
Direct material total variance	€ 1,144	(A)

See Direct material total variance § Example and Direct material price variance § Example for computations of both components.
