= Taxpayers Right-To-Know Act =

- Long title: To provide taxpayers with an annual report disclosing the cost and performance of Government programs and areas of duplication among them, and for other purposes.
- Announced in: the 113th United States Congress
- Sponsored by: Rep. James Lankford (R, OK-5)
- Number of co-sponsors: 1

Codification
- Acts affected: Statutory Pay-As-You-Go Act of 2010, Improper Payments Information Act of 2002
- U.S.C. sections affected: 31 U.S.C. § 712, 31 U.S.C. § 1105, 31 U.S.C. § 321, 31 U.S.C. § 1115, 5 U.S.C. § 551, and others.
- Agencies affected: United States Congress, Government Accountability Office, Executive Office of the President, Office of Management and Budget

Legislative history
- Introduced in the House as H.R. 1423 by Rep. James Lankford (R, OK-5) on April 9, 2013; Committee consideration by United States House Committee on Oversight and Government Reform; Passed the House on February 25, 2014 (voice vote)

The Taxpayers Right-To-Know Act (H.R. 1423) is a bill that would require government agencies to identify and describe each program they administer, the cost to administer those programs, expenditures for services, the number of program beneficiaries, and the number of federal employees and contract staff involved. It would also require information on how the program gets evaluated.

The bill passed in the United States House of Representatives during the 113th United States Congress.

== Provisions of the bill ==
This summary is based largely on the summary provided by the Congressional Research Service, a public domain source.

The Taxpayers Right-To-Know Act would require the head of each federal agency, on an annual basis, to: (1) identify and describe every program administered by such agency; (2) determine the total administrative costs and expenditures for services for each program; (3) estimate the number of clients served by each program and the beneficiaries who received assistance under each program; (4) estimate the number of full-time federal and contract employees who administer each program; and (5) identify federal programs with duplicative or overlapping missions, services, and allowable uses of funds.

The bill would require each agency head to publish on the agency website, not later than February 1 of each fiscal year, the information required by this Act, the latest performance reviews of each agency program, improper payment rates, the total amount of undisbursed grant funding remaining in grant accounts, and recommendations for consolidating duplicative or overlapping programs, eliminating waste and inefficiency, and terminating lower priority, outdated, and unnecessary programs and initiatives.

The bill would require the Director of the Office of Management and Budget (OMB), not later than February 1 of each fiscal year, to publish on the OMB website a report that contains: (1) an identification of programs across agencies with duplicative or overlapping missions, services, and allowable uses of funds; and (2) recommendations to consolidate duplicative programs, eliminate waste and inefficiency, and terminate lower priority, outdated, and unnecessary programs and initiatives.

The bill would amend the Statutory Pay-As-You-Go Act of 2010 to require the Comptroller General (GAO) to maintain and provide regular annual updates to a publicly available website that tracks the status of agency responses to recommendations by the Comptroller General for identifying duplicative government programs.

The bill would declare that nothing in this Act shall be construed to require the disclosure of classified information.

== Congressional Budget Office report ==
This summary is based largely on the summary provided by the Congressional Budget Office, as ordered reported by the House Committee on Oversight and Government Reform on July 24, 2013. This is a public domain source.

H.R. 1423 would require government agencies to identify and describe each program they administer, the cost to administer those programs, expenditures for services, the number of program beneficiaries, and the number of federal employees and contract staff involved. Under the bill, that information would be posted on each agency's website. H.R. 1423 would require the Office of Management and Budget (OMB) to submit to the Congress an annual report that identifies duplicative federal programs. Finally, the Government Accountability Office (GAO) would be required to maintain and update a database on duplicative programs.

Based on information from several agencies, the Congressional Budget Office (CBO) estimates that implementing H.R. 1423 would cost around $100 million over the 2014-2018 period, assuming appropriation of the necessary amounts. Enacting the bill could affect direct spending by agencies not funded through annual appropriations; therefore, pay-as-you-go procedures apply. The CBO estimates, however, that any net increase in spending by those agencies would be negligible. Enacting H.R. 1423 would not affect revenues.

H.R. 1423 contains no intergovernmental or private-sector mandates as defined in the Unfunded Mandates Reform Act and would not affect the budgets of state, local, or tribal governments.

== Procedural history ==
The Taxpayers Right-To-Know Act was introduced into the United States House of Representatives on April 9, 2013, by Rep. James Lankford (R, OK-5). It was referred to the United States House Committee on Oversight and Government Reform. It was reported (amended) alongside House Report 113-355 on February 21, 2014. House Majority Leader Eric Cantor announced on February 21, 2014, that the bill would be considered under a suspension of the rules on February 25, 2014. On February 25, 2014, the House voted to pass the bill by a voice vote.

== Debate and discussion ==
The Hill summarized Rep. Lankford's arguments in favor of the bill by saying that the bill "would help people see clearly where duplication exists in the federal government, and help reduce waste."

Rep. Kevin Brady (R-TX) supported the bill, along with several other reform bills, by saying that "these common-sense bills will hold federal agencies more accountable when it comes to how they use tax dollars and how they treat taxpayers."

== See also ==
- List of bills in the 113th United States Congress
