= Furlough =

Temporary leave of employees due to special needs of employer

A furlough (/ˈfɜːrloʊ/; from Dutch: verlof, "leave of absence") is a temporary cessation of paid employment that is intended to address the problems of a company or employer; these problems may be due to economic conditions that affect a specific employer or to those prevailing in society as a whole. Furloughs may be short-term or long-term. They are also known as temporary layoffs or retrenchment in other jurisdictions.

== By country ==
=== United States ===
==== US federal government ====
In the United States, involuntary furloughs concerning federal government employees may be of a sudden and immediate nature. Such was the case in February 2010, when a single United States Senate objection prevented emergency funding measures from being implemented. As a result, 2,000 federal workers for the Department of Transportation were immediately furloughed as of March 1, 2010.

The longest such case is the October 1st to November 12, 2025, shutdown, which has affected all non-essential employees, shutting down many services including National Institutes of Health, visa and passport processing, parks, and many others. This happened previously on October 1, 2013, and on January 19, 2018.

The United States Congress failed to pass a re-authorization of funding for the Federal Aviation Administration, and as a result, furloughed about 4,000 workers at midnight on July 22, 2011.

===== Potential furlough in 2011 =====
Congress was on the verge of forcing a government shutdown on April 8, 2011, if its plan to reduce the federal budget deficit was not resolved; such a shutdown would have caused the furlough of 800,000 out of two million civilian federal employees.

===== Furloughs in 2013 =====
The first federal government furloughs of 2013 went into effect as a result of budget sequestration (or sequester) – the automatic spending cuts in particular categories of federal outlays. (This procedure was first used in the Gramm–Rudman–Hollings Balanced Budget Act of 1985.) The sequesters were designed to take place if the federal deficit exceeded a set of fixed deficit targets. In 2013 specifically, sequestration refers to a section of the Budget Control Act of 2011 (BCA) that was initially set to begin on January 1, 2013, as an austerity fiscal policy. These cuts were postponed by two months by the American Taxpayer Relief Act of 2012 until March 1, when this law went into effect. At that time, most federal departments and agencies began furloughing their employees in order to meet their spending cut targets. For the Department of Defense, almost all of the civilian workforce as well as most full-time, dual-status military technicians of the National Guard and the Reserves were affected. The initial furlough requirement was 176 working hours per affected employee, which was later cut to 88 hours. Due to cost-cutting measures in other areas, this furlough was further reduced to a total of 48 working hours per DoD civilian and full-time Reserve Component member.

Later, on October 1, 2013, at 12:01 am EDT, Congress' inability to agree on a spending bill led to a government shutdown. During the shutdown, most "non-essential" government employees were furloughed. This resulted in approximately 800,000 government workers being put on a leave beginning on October 1. Congress later unanimously voted to restore pay to the furloughed workers.

===== Furloughs in 2018 and 2019 =====
Due to the government shutdown starting on December 22, 2018, approximately 350,000 federal employees were furloughed for 35 days until January 25, 2019.

===== Furloughs in 2020 =====
In September 2019 the United States Department of Labor issued Fact Sheet #70 governing furloughs. These rules have remained in place (as of 21 March 2020), but with new developments in connection with the COVID-19 pandemic in the United States, new rules and guidance could be issued at any time. The United States Department of Labor has a Coronavirus Resources page which can be consulted for the latest developments.

===== 2025 federal government shutdown =====
The United States Government experienced a shutdown at midnight on October 1st, 2025. Hundreds of thousands of government employees were furloughed or not receiving pay as a result thereof.

==== Schools ====
Board members of various school districts as well as universities implemented "furlough days" in 2009. This made students pay the same rate, if not more, for their education while providing fewer educational days by forcing educators and staff members to take the day off. In states such as Georgia, the Board of Regents of the University System of Georgia included a clause so that mandatory furlough days are implemented but no classes are lost during the 2009–2010 academic year.

In California, the State Employee Trades Council (SETC) voted to implement a mandatory two-day-per-month furlough policy for the staff and faculty of the CSU system. The furloughs, intended to prevent layoffs, began in August 2009, and ended in June 2010. The 10% cut saved about $270 million of the CSU's $564 million budget deficit.

==== Private sector ====
During the global recession of 2009 companies such as Intel, Toyota, and Gannett implemented furloughs.

In the US federal government shutdown of 2013 federal contractors such as Lockheed Martin and United Technologies considered furloughing their own employees.

In 2020, retail giants, including Kohl's and Macy's, furloughed thousands of employees because of decreased sales connected to the COVID-19 pandemic in the United States.

In April 2020, Disney furloughed over 100,000 employees, while almost all Disney executives kept their jobs and received bonuses.

=== United Kingdom ===
The word furlough was used until at least 1908 to describe military personnel home on leave. It was also widely used by religious groups in the twentieth century to refer to the periods when their missionaries returned to the UK on long leave.

==== COVID-19 pandemic ====
In 2020, in response to the COVID-19 pandemic, Her Majesty's Government introduced what was described as a "furlough" programme to support employers and workers. For many years the term "furlough" had been very little known in the United Kingdom, and many HR managers were not acquainted with the US "furlough" system. Formally named the Coronavirus Job Retention Scheme, it funded businesses to continue paying up to 80% of employees' salary for those that would otherwise have been made unemployed.

=== Philippines ===
In the Philippines, a furloughed employee is deemed to be placed on "floating status". The Labor Code, particularly Article 301, provides a legal basis for the furlough process of an employee; an employee could be furloughed if the business had a "bono fide suspension of operations" or if the said individual should fulfill a military or civic duty. The Labor Code emphasizes that the employment status of a furloughed employee is not terminated. Employees under "floating status" do not render actual work and thus do not receive any salary. However an employee may only be placed on floating status for a period of not more than six months after which the employee could be retrenched or asked to report back to work.

During the COVID-19 pandemic, the Department of Labor and Employment issued an order allowing furloughed employees to be extended for a year provided there is mutual agreement between the employer and employee and for employees to look for alternative temporary work without losing their employment status with their original employer.

== Other uses ==
The term furlough in employment can also refer to annual leave, long service leave, or temporary layoff time based on a company-planned schedule. For example, with a "work three weeks, off one week" schedule, a company's workforce is divided into four groups. Each group, in turn, takes a week off on furlough while the remainder work. It can also refer to a pause from active missionary work, military leave, or, in the case of convicts, parole, probation, conjugal visit, or work release.

== See also ==
- Four-day week – Arrangement to work four days per week
- Layoff – Involuntary termination of employment of an employee due to business concerns
- Prison furlough – Authorized temporary release of a prisoner
- Short-time working
