= Budget sequestration =

U.S. legislative procedure reducing spending by the Federal Government

Budget sequestration is a provision of United States law that causes an across-the-board reduction in certain kinds of spending included in the federal budget. Sequestration involves setting a hard cap on the amount of government spending within broadly defined categories; if Congress enacts annual appropriations legislation that exceeds these caps, an across-the-board spending cut is automatically imposed on these categories, affecting all departments and programs by an equal percentage. The amount exceeding the budget limit is held back by the Treasury and not transferred to the agencies specified in the appropriation bills. The word sequestration was derived from a legal term referring to the seizing of property by an agent of the court, to prevent destruction or harm, while any dispute over said property is resolved in court.

The term "budget sequestration" was first used to describe an enforcement procedure of the Balanced Budget and Emergency Deficit Control Act of 1985 (BBEDCA) designed to keep Federal deficits below a maximum level limit. The hard caps were abandoned and replaced with a PAYGO system by the Budget Enforcement Act of 1990, which was in effect until 2002. Sequestration was later included as part of the Budget Control Act of 2011, which resolved the debt-ceiling crisis; the bill set up a Congressional debt-reduction committee and included the sequestration as a disincentive to be activated only if Congress did not pass deficit reduction legislation. However, the committee did not come to agreement on any plan, activating the sequestration plan. The sequestration was to come into force on January 1, 2013 and was considered part of the fiscal cliff, but the American Taxpayer Relief Act of 2012 delayed it until March 1 of that year.

== Gramm–Rudman–Hollings Act ==
Budget sequestration was first authorized by the Balanced Budget and Emergency Deficit Control Act of 1985 (BBEDCA, Title II of Pub. L. 99-177). This is colloquially referred to as the Deficit Control. They provided for automatic spending cuts (called "sequesters") if the deficit exceeded a set of fixed deficit targets. The process for determining the amount of the automatic cuts was found unconstitutional in the case of Bowsher v. Synar, 478 U.S. 714 (1986) and Congress enacted a reworked version of the law in 1987. Gramm-Rudman failed, however, to prevent large budget deficits. The Budget Enforcement Act of 1990 supplanted the fixed deficit targets.

== PAYGO era ==
From 1990 until 2002, and again since 2010, Congress has operated under a system called PAYGO, under which any new government spending needs to be offset by savings from (or cuts to) current programs.

In the initial PAYGO regimen, enacted in the Omnibus Budget Reconciliation Act of 1990 (OBRA '90), by statutory requirement, if legislation enacted during a session of Congress had the effect of increasing the projected deficit for the following year, a sequestration would be triggered. These rules were in effect from FY1991-FY2002. Enacted in 1990, it was extended in the Omnibus Budget Reconciliation Act of 1993 and the Balanced Budget Act of 1997.

Beginning in 1998, in response to the first federal budget surplus since 1969, Congress started enacting, and the President signing, increases in discretionary spending above the statutory limit using creative means such as advance appropriations, delays in making obligations and payments, emergency designations, and specific directives. While staying within the technical definition of the law, this allowed spending that otherwise would not be allowed. The result was emergency spending of $34 billion in 1999 and $44 billion in 2000.

The PAYGO statute expired at the end of 2002. After this, Congress enacted President George W. Bush's proposed 2003 tax cuts (enacted as the Jobs and Growth Tax Relief Reconciliation Act of 2003), and the Medicare Prescription Drug, Improvement, and Modernization Act. The White House acknowledged that the new Medicare prescription drug benefit plan would not meet the PAYGO requirements. The PAYGO system was reestablished as a standing rule of the House of Representatives (which does not have the force of law) on January 4, 2007 by the Democratic-controlled 110th Congress, but less than one year later, facing widespread demand to ease looming tax burdens caused by the Alternative Minimum Tax, Congress abandoned its pay-go pledge. The point of order was also waived for the Economic Stimulus Act of 2008 passed during the Bush administration, which included revenue reducing provisions and increases in spending that increased the deficit. At the beginning of the 111th Congress, PAYGO was modified by including an "emergency" exemption, which was provided for the American Recovery and Reinvestment Act of 2009 during the Obama administration.

In 2010 President Obama signed the Statutory Pay-As-You-Go Act into law, making PAYGO again mandatory.

== Budget Control Act era ==
In 2011, sequestration was used in the Budget Control Act of 2011 (Pub. L. 112-25) as a tool in federal budget control. This 2011 act authorized an increase in the debt ceiling in exchange for $2.4 trillion in deficit reduction over the following ten years. This total included $1.2 trillion in spending cuts identified specifically in the legislation, with an additional $1.2 trillion in cuts that were to be determined by a bipartisan group of Senators and Representatives known as the "Super Committee" or officially as the United States Congress Joint Select Committee on Deficit Reduction. The Super Committee failed to reach an agreement. In that event, a trigger mechanism in the bill was activated to implement across-the-board reductions in the rate of increase in spending known as "sequestration".

The Sequestration Transparency Act of 2012 (Pub. L. 112-155) requires the president to submit a report to Congress on a potential sequestration which may be triggered by the failure of the "Super Committee" to propose and for Congress to enact, a plan to reduce the U.S. Federal Budget by $1.2 trillion as required by the Budget Control Act. The report – which was issued September 14, 2012, and was close to 400 pages long – provided the warning that "sequestration would be deeply destructive to national security... and core government functions".

The start of the sequestration was delayed from January 2, 2013 to March 1, 2013 by the American Taxpayer Relief Act of 2012, which was passed by both houses of Congress on January 1, 2013 as a partial resolution to the fiscal cliff crisis. The bill also lowered the sequestration cap for 2014 to offset the two-month delay in 2013. Also, for 2013 only, certain "security" funding such as homeland security and international affairs were included in the sequestration cut in order to lessen the cuts to defense.

In December 2013, the Bipartisan Budget Act of 2013 increased the sequestration caps for fiscal years 2014 and 2015 by $45 billion and $18 billion, respectively, in return for extending the imposition of the cuts to mandatory spending into 2022 and 2023, and miscellaneous savings elsewhere in the budget.

=== Discretionary spending caps ===
The Budget Control Act of 2011 set limits on discretionary spending, with separate pools for defense and non-defense spending. The act specified one set of caps to be enforced if the Joint Select Committee on Deficit Reduction would produce a plan to reduce deficits by $1.2 trillion over 10 years, and Congress would enact it by January 15, 2012; if this did not happen, "automatic enforcement procedures" would impose a lower set of caps. Because the Joint Select Committee on Deficit Reduction did not come to agreement on any plan, the lower caps went into effect. The values in the table below reflect these lower caps.

The BCA column shows the discretionary caps in the original Budget Control Act, as estimated in 2012. (Some of the automatic spending reductions target mandatory spending, leading to some fluctuation in estimates of the discretionary funding.) The actual caps, as modified by subsequent legislation, are also shown.

Fiscal year	BCA (billions)	Actual (billions)
2012	$1,043	$1,043
2013	$1,047	$1,043 (American Taxpayer Relief Act of 2012)
2014	$973	$1,012 (Bipartisan Budget Act of 2013)
2015	$994	$1,014 (Bipartisan Budget Act of 2013)
2016	$1,016	$1,067 (Bipartisan Budget Act of 2015)
2017	$1,040	$1,070 (Bipartisan Budget Act of 2015)
2018	$1,066	$1,208 (Bipartisan Budget Act of 2018)
2019	$1,093	$1,244 (Bipartisan Budget Act of 2018)
2020	$1,120	
2021	$1,146	

== See also ==
- Austerity
