= 5965 =

Twin triode vacuum tube

- Classification: Triode
- Service: Digital computers
- Height: 1 15/32 in (37 mm)
- Diameter: 7/8 in (22 mm)

Cathode
- Cathode type: Unipotential
- Heater voltage: 6.3 V or 12.6 V
- Heater current: 450 mA or 225 mA

Anode
- Max voltage: 200 V
- Max current: 100 mA

Socket connections
- 9A Pin 1 – Unit 2 Anode (Plate); Pin 2 – Unit 2 Grid; Pin 3 – Unit 2 Cathode; Pin 4 – Unit 2 Heater; Pin 5 – Unit 1 Heater; Pin 6 – Unit 1 Anode (Plate); Pin 7 – Unit 1 Grid; Pin 8 – Unit 1 Cathode; Pin 9 – Heater mid-tap (bottom view)

References
- https://web.archive.org/web/20230314212705/https://frank.pocnet.net/sheets/137/5/5965.pdf

The 5965 is a miniature twin triode vacuum tube (thermionic valve) "designed for use in high-speed digital computers".

According to an MIT Project Whirwind memorandum, the tube was developed c.1953 for IBM by GE, primarily for use in the IBM 701 computer, and was designated as a general-purpose triode tube. In European use the tube was labelled E180CC; sometimes the same tube was labelled with both names.

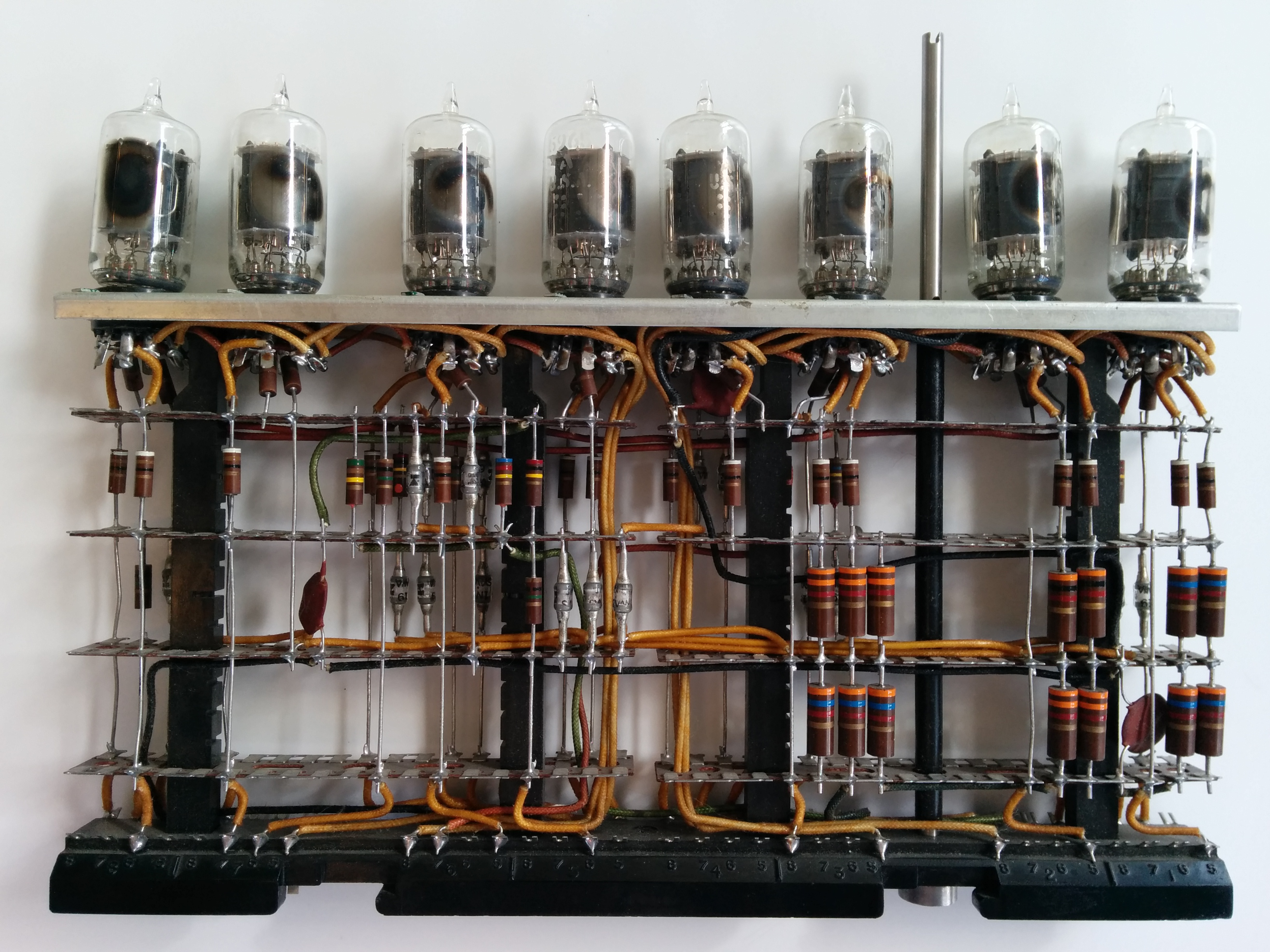
Vacuum tube logic module from a 700 series IBM computer featuring 5965 tubes.

== See also ==
- 7AK7, a popular type of tube found in early digital computers
- 25L6, another type of tube found in early computers
