= Direct material total variance =

In variance analysis (accounting) direct material total variance is the difference between the actual cost of actual number of units produced and its budgeted cost in terms of material. Direct material total variance can be divided into two components:

- the direct material price variance,
- the direct material usage variance.

== Example ==
Let us assume that standard direct material cost of widget is as follows:

2 kg of unobtainium at $ 60 per kg ( = $ 120 per unit).

Let us assume further that during the given period, 100 widgets were manufactured, using 212 kg of unobtainium which cost $ 13,144.

Under those assumptions direct material total variance can be calculated as:

100 units should have cost (× $ 120 per unit)	€ 12,000
but did cost	€ 13,144
Direct material total variance	€ 1,144	(A)

Direct material total variance can be reconciled to direct material price variance and direct material usage variance by:

Direct material usage variance	€ 720	(A)
Direct material price variance	€ 424	(A)
Direct material total variance	€ 1,144	(A)

See direct material usage variance#Example and direct material price variance#Example for computations of both components.

== See also ==
- Variance analysis (accounting)
- Direct material price variance
- Direct material usage variance
