= Direct material price variance =

In variance analysis (accounting) direct material price variance is the difference between the standard cost and the actual cost for the actual quantity of material purchased. It is one of the two components (the other is direct material usage variance) of direct material total variance.

== Example ==
Let us assume that the standard direct material cost of widget is as follows:

2 kg of unobtainium at € 60 per kg ( = € 120 per unit).

Let us assume further that during the given period, 100 widgets were manufactured, using 212 kg of unobtainium which cost € 13,144.

Under those assumptions direct material price variance can be calculated as:

212 kg of unobtainium should have cost (× € 60)	€ 12,720
but did cost	€ 13,144
Direct material (unobtainium) price variance	€ 424	(A)

Direct material price variance can be reconciled to direct material total variance by way of direct material usage variance:

Direct material usage variance	€ 720	(A)
Direct material price variance	€ 424	(A)
Direct material total variance	€ 1,144	(A)

spending variance seen as per product cost (212*62)-(200*60) See direct material total variance#Example and direct material usage variance#Example for computations of both components.

== See also ==
- Variance analysis (accounting)
