= 7AK7 =

Pentode vacuum tube

- Classification: Pentode
- Service: Digital computers
- Height: 3 5/32 in (80 mm)
- Diameter: 1 3/16 in (30 mm)

Cathode
- Cathode type: Coated Unipotential
- Heater voltage: 7.0 V (6.3 V nominal)
- Heater current: 800 mA

Anode
- Max dissipation Watts: 8.5 W
- Max voltage: 200 V

Socket connections
- 8V-L-O Pin 1 – Heater; Pin 2 – Anode (Plate); Pin 3 – Grid 2 (Screen); Pin 4 – Grid 3 (Suppressor); Pin 5 – n.c. Pin 6 – Grid 1 (Control); Pin 7 – Cathode Pin 8 – Heater

References
- https://web.archive.org/web/20221114011216/http://www.nj7p.org/Tubes/PDFs/Frank/137-Sylvania/7AK7.pdf

The 7AK7 is a pentode vacuum tube (thermionic valve). According to its manufacturer, Sylvania, it was "designed for service in electronic computers".

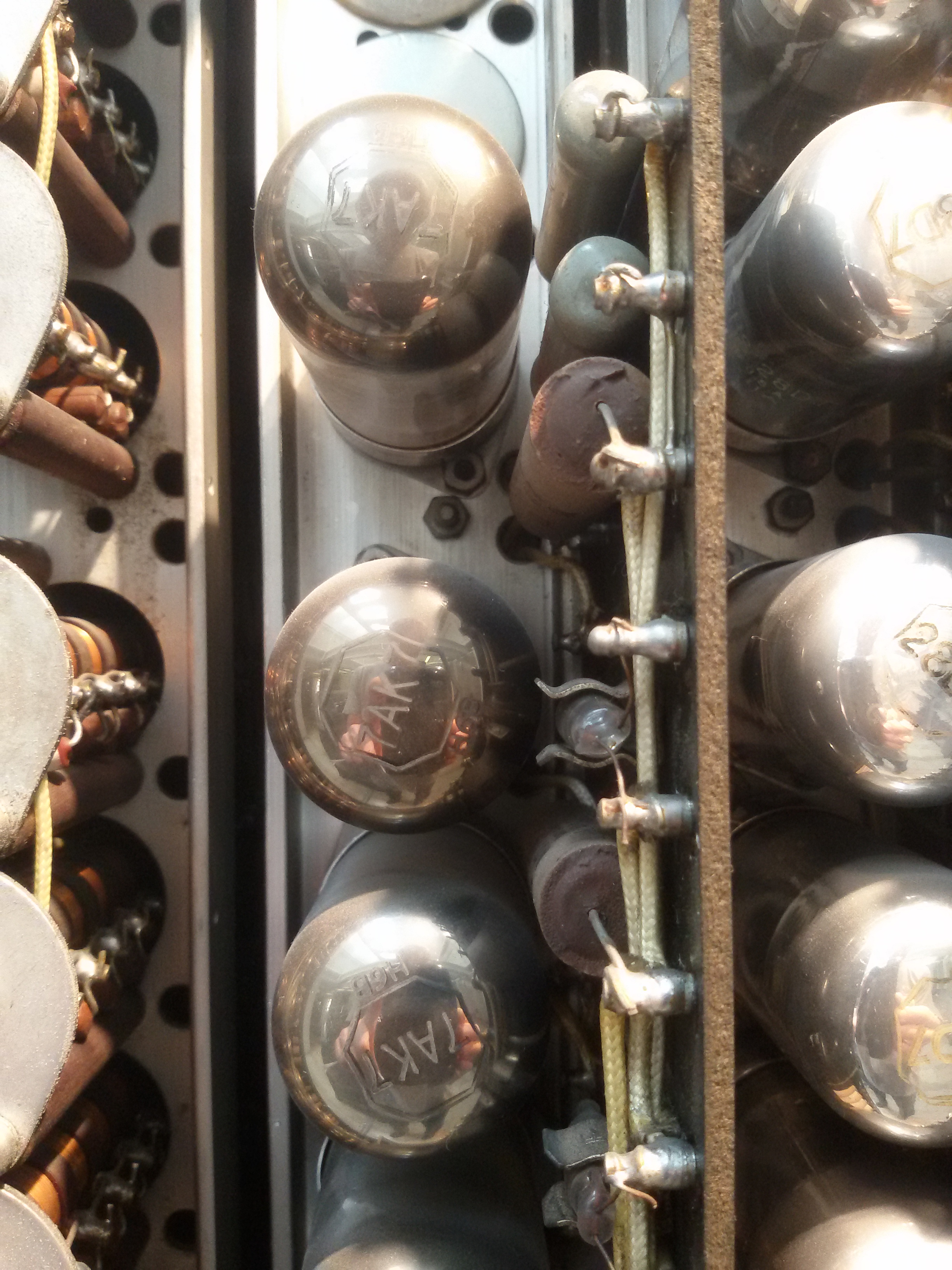
7AK7 vacuum tubes in a 1956 UNIVAC I computer

The tube was developed in 1948, designed at the request of L. D. Wilson for use in the Whirlwind computer. Significant attention was directed towards its manufacturing process in order to ensure the part's reliability. Dubbed the "computer tube", it became a popular tube for computers for a while. IBM, however, switched to more compact miniature tubes, starting with the IBM 604 in 1948.

== See also ==
- 5965, a triode developed for early digital computers
- 25L6, a tetrode found in early computers
