= Budget Enforcement Act of 1990 =

US federal law

- Long title: An Act to enforce the deficit reduction accomplished by the Omnibus Budget Reconciliation Act of 1990 by revising federal budget control procedures, and for other purposes.
- Acronyms (colloquial): BEA
- Enacted by: the 101st United States Congress

Citations
- Public law: Pub. L. 101–508, title XIII
- Statutes at Large: 104 Stat. 1388

Codification
- Acts amended: Balanced Budget and Emergency Deficit Control Act of 1985; Congressional Budget Act of 1974
- U.S.C. sections created: Scattered sections of 2 U.S.C. & 15 U.S.C. § 1022

Legislative history
- Introduced in the House as H.R. 5835 by Rep. Leon Panetta (D–CA) on October 15, 1990; Committee consideration by House Budget Committee; Passed the House on October 16, 1990 (227–203); Passed the Senate on October 19, 1990 (54–46 (in lieu of S. 3209)); Reported by the joint conference committee on October 27, 1990; agreed to by the House on October 27, 1990 (228–200); Signed into law by President George H. W. Bush on November 5, 1990

Major amendments
- Omnibus Budget Reconciliation Act of 1993, Balanced Budget Act of 1997

The Budget Enforcement Act of 1990 (BEA) (Pub. L. 101–508, title XIII; 104 Stat. 1388-573; codified as amended at scattered sections of 2 U.S.C. & 15 U.S.C. § 1022) was enacted by the United States Congress as title XIII of the Omnibus Budget Reconciliation Act of 1990, to enforce the deficit reduction accomplished by that law by revising the federal budget control procedures originally enacted by the Gramm–Rudman–Hollings Balanced Budget Act. The BEA created two new budget control processes: a set of caps on annually-appropriated discretionary spending, and a "pay-as-you-go" or "PAYGO" process for entitlements and taxes.

== Legislative history ==
The predecessor to the BEA, Gramm-Rudman-Hollings, was originally enacted in 1985 and set overall deficit targets as a way to force Congress to enact future deficit reduction. If these deficit targets were not met, the president was required issue a sequestration order to automatically reduce discretionary spending.

However, policymakers achieved these targets by using overly optimistic budget projections and other budget gimmicks, and Gramm-Rudman-Hollings was eventually viewed by policymakers as contributing to, rather than solving, the problem of rising deficits. By October 1990, the president's Office of Management and Budget projected a budget deficit for fiscal year 1991 that exceeded the statutory target; if Congress did not enact a deficit reduction plan, sequestration would have cut discretionary spending by about one-third.

In November 1990, Congress and President George H. W. Bush agreed to a bipartisan deficit reduction deal that would achieve roughly $500 billion in savings over five years through a combination of spending cuts and tax increases. These savings were enacted through the Omnibus Budget Reconciliation Act of 1990 and enforced by the budget procedures contained in Title XIII, the BEA, which was signed into law on November 5, 1990.

== Provisions ==
Unlike Gramm-Rudman-Hollings, which set fixed deficit targets in hopes of encouraging future Congressional action, the BEA implemented budget controls meant to prevent Congress from taking actions that would increase the deficit. Specifically, the BEA

- Introduced caps on discretionary spending, thus limiting the amount of funds Congress could provide in annual appropriations bills. Members of Congress could enforce these caps while a bill was under consideration by raising a point of order. If the caps were breached through enacted legislation, they would be enforced by a presidential sequester order that would cut discretionary spending across the board.
- Introduced statutory "pay-as-you-go" or PAYGO procedures to govern new legislation that impacted direct spending and/or revenues. PAYGO required that any new spending increase or tax cut be offset by spending cuts or tax increases elsewhere. The Office of Management and Budget would track such legislation throughout the fiscal year on a PAYGO scorecard, and if such spending increases and tax cuts were not completely offset, the President would issue a sequestration order that would cut non-exempt direct spending programs.
- Extended and revised the deficit targets from Gramm-Rudman-Hollings, allowing for revisions to the deficit targets to reflect changes in the economy, ensuring that sequestration would not be triggered unless Congress breached the discretionary spending caps or violated PAYGO.

== Subsequent legislation ==
The BEA was extended by the Omnibus Reconciliation Act of 1993, and again by the Balanced Budget Act of 1997. It expired in 2002, but the Democratic Majority adopted some of its principles, known as PAYGO, or Pay-As-You-Go, in their rules during the 110th Congress. This was passed as H. RES. 6 on January 4, 2007. Statutory PAYGO was reinstated by the Statutory Pay-As-You-Go Act of 2010, which President Barack Obama signed on February 12, 2010. Discretionary spending caps, as well as deficit reduction targets, were reintroduced by the Budget Control Act of 2011.

== Legacy and impact ==
The BEA is credited with helping to reduce deficits during the 1990s, and regarded as more successful than its predecessor Gramm-Rudman-Hollings. Then-director of the Congressional Budget Office, Robert Reischauer, compared the legacy of these two laws in testimony before Congress in 1993, concluding that “budget procedures are much better at enforcing deficit reduction agreements (as the Budget Enforcement Act has done) than at forcing such agreements to be reached." Sequestration was triggered only twice under the BEA, resulting in small discretionary spending cuts in 1991. However, Congress began to weaken the BEA's budget controls when faced with budget surpluses in the late 1990s.

== See also ==
- United States budget process
- Congressional Budget and Impoundment Control Act of 1974
- Gramm–Rudman–Hollings Balanced Budget Act
- Omnibus Budget Reconciliation Act of 1990
- Balanced Budget Act of 1997
- Statutory Pay-As-You-Go Act of 2010
- Budget Control Act of 2011
