= Direct labour cost variance =

Direct labour cost variance is the difference between the standard cost for actual production and the actual cost in production.

There are two kinds of labour variances. Labour Rate Variance is the difference between the standard cost and the actual cost paid for the actual number of hours. Labour efficiency variance is the difference between the standard labour hour that should have been worked for the actual number of units produced and the actual number of hours worked when the labour hours are valued at the standard rate.

== Labour Efficiency Variance ==
Difference between the amount of labor time that should have been used and the labor that was actually used, multiplied by the standard rate. For example, assume that the standard cost of direct labor per unit of product A is 2.5 hours x $14 = $35. Assume further that during the month of March the company recorded 4500 hours of direct labor time. The actual cost of this labor time was $64,800, or an average of $14.40 per hour. The company produced 2000 units of product A during the month. The labor efficiency variance is (4500 - 5000) x $14 = $7000, where 5000 hours = 2.5 hours x 2000 units of output. This variance is favorable since the actual hours used are less than the standard hours allowed. This may be the result of efficient use of labor time due to automation or the use of improved production methods.
