= Standard budget =

Economics concept

A standard budget is a household budget that lists the goods and services that a family of a specified size and composition would need to live at a designated level of well-being, together with the costs of those goods and services.

Considerable work on standard budgets has been done in the United States and other countries in recent years, mostly by non-government analysts. Budgets have not been used to develop official poverty lines, and in most cases have not been used to calculate the size of a nation’s low-income population.

The main way a standard budget is established is by using historical information. If standards are set using historical information, they may become out of date quickly. A standard budget is a vehicle for variance. It is commonly derived from estimates on future costs that have fixed and variable cost components.

Standard budgets present information at only one level of activity, and do not provide information on how the variable portion of the costs would affect the budget. When used in variance analysis, this can lead to unfavorable variances being falsely identified.
