= Budgetary policy =

Government attempts to run a budget in equity or in surplus

Budgetary policy refers to government attempts to run a budget in equity or in surplus. The aim is to reduce the public debt.

It is not the same as a fiscal policy, which deals with the fiscal stimulus to the economy, the repartition of taxes and the generosity of allowances. It is the policy which governments adopt while formulating budget. It helps in shaping the form or structure of budget. Macroeconomics dictates that both fiscal and budgetary policy are utilized together to achieve economic stability. It has 3 types: deficit policy, balanced policy, and surplus policy.
