= Variance (accounting) =

Difference between standard cost and amount sold

In budgeting, and management accounting in general, a variance is the difference between a budgeted, planned, or standard cost and the actual amount incurred/sold. Variances can be computed for both costs and revenues.

The concept of variance is intrinsically connected with planned and actual results and effects of the difference between those two on the performance of the entity or company.

== Types of variances ==
Variances can be divided according to their effect or nature of the underlying amounts.

When effect of variance is concerned, there are two types of variances:

- When actual results are better than expected results given variance is described as favorable variance. In common use favorable variance is denoted by the letter F—usually in parentheses (F).
- When actual results are worse than expected results given variance is described as adverse variance, or unfavourable variance. In common use adverse variance is denoted by the letter U or the letter A—usually in parentheses (A).

The second typology (according to the nature of the underlying amount) is determined by the needs of users of the variance information and may include e.g.:

- Variable cost variances
  - Direct material variances
  - Direct labour variances
  - Variable production overhead variances
- Fixed production overhead variances
- Sales variances

== Variance analysis ==
Variance analysis, in budgeting or management accounting in general, is a tool of budgetary control and performance evaluation, assessing any variances between the budgeted, planned, or standard amount, and the actual amount realized. Variance analysis can be carried out for both costs and revenues.

Variance analysis is usually associated with explaining the difference (or variance) between actual costs and the standard costs allowed for the good output. For example, the difference in materials costs can be divided into a materials price variance and a materials usage variance. The difference between the actual direct labor costs and the standard direct labor costs can be divided into a rate variance and an efficiency variance. The difference in manufacturing overhead can be divided into spending, efficiency, and volume variances. Mix and yield variances can also be calculated.

Variance analysis helps management to understand the present costs and then to control future costs. Variance calculation should always be calculated by taking the planned or budgeted amount and subtracting from the actual/forecasted value. Thus a positive number is favorable and a negative number is unfavorable.

== See also ==
- Budgeting
- Non-profit organization
- Standard budget
- Standards
- Motivation
- Performance evaluation
- Direct material total variance
- Direct material price variance
- Direct material usage variance
