= Gramm–Rudman–Hollings Balanced Budget Act =

United States federal law concerning austerity and sequestration

Balanced Budget and Emergency Deficit Control Act of 1985
- Other short titles: Gramm–Rudman–Hollings Deficit Reduction Act of 1985
- Long title: A joint resolution increasing the statutory limit on the public debt.
- Acronyms (colloquial): BBEDCA
- Nicknames: Deficit Control Act
- Enacted by: the 99th United States Congress
- Effective: December 12, 1985

Citations
- Public law: 99-177
- Statutes at Large: 99 Stat. 1037

Codification
- Acts amended: Congressional Budget and Impoundment Control Act of 1974
- Titles amended: 2 U.S.C.: Congress
- U.S.C. sections amended: 2 U.S.C. ch. 20 § 901

Legislative history
- Introduced in the House as H.J.Res. 372 by Phil Gramm (R–TX), Warren Rudman (R–NH), Fritz Hollings (D–SC) on August 1, 1985; Committee consideration by Senate Finance; Passed the House on August 1, 1985 (passed); Passed the Senate on October 10, 1985 (51-37); Reported by the joint conference committee on December 10, 1985; agreed to by the House on December 11, 1985 (271-154) and by the Senate on December 11, 1985 (61-31); Signed into law by President Ronald Reagan on December 12, 1985

Major amendments
- Deficit Reduction Act of 2005; Budget Control Act of 2011; Fiscal Responsibility Act of 2023

The Gramm–Rudman–Hollings Balanced Budget and Emergency Deficit Control Act of 1985 and the Balanced Budget and Emergency Deficit Control Reaffirmation Act of 1987 (both often known as Gramm–Rudman) were the first binding spending constraints on the federal budget.

After enactment, these Acts were often referred to as "Gramm-Rudman-Hollings I" and Gramm-Rudman-Hollings II) after U.S. senators Phil Gramm (R-Texas), Warren Rudman (R-New Hampshire), and Fritz Hollings (D-South Carolina), who were credited as their chief authors.

== Provisions of Acts ==
The term "budget sequestration" was first used to describe a section of the Gramm–Rudman–Hollings Deficit Reduction Act of 1985.

The Acts aimed to cut the United States federal budget deficit. This deficit is the amount by which expenditures by the federal government exceed its revenues each year and was at the time the largest in history in dollar terms. The Acts provided for automatic spending cuts ("cancellation of budgetary resources", called "sequestration") if the total discretionary appropriations in various categories exceed in a fiscal year the budget spending thresholds. That is, if Congress enacts appropriation bills providing for discretionary outlays in each fiscal year that exceed the budget totals, unless Congress passes another budget resolution increasing the budget amount, an across-the-board spending cut in discretionary expenditure is automatically triggered in these categories, affecting all departments and programs by an equal percentage. The amount exceeding the limit is held back by the Treasury and not transferred to the agencies specified in the appropriation bills.

Under the 1985 Act, allowable deficit levels were calculated in consideration of the eventual elimination of the federal deficit. If the budget exceeded the allowable deficit, across-the-board cuts were required. Directors of the Office of Management and Budget (OMB) and the Congressional Budget Office (CBO) were required to report to the Comptroller General regarding their recommendations for how much must be cut. The Comptroller General then evaluated these reports, made his own conclusion, and gave a recommendation to the President, who was then required to issue an order effecting the reductions recommended by the Comptroller General unless Congress made the cuts in other ways within a specified amount of time.

The Comptroller General is nominated by the President from a list of three people recommended by the presiding officers of the House and Senate. He is removable only by impeachment or a joint resolution of Congress, which requires majority votes in both houses and is subject to a Presidential veto. Congress can give a number of reasons for this removal, including "inefficiency", "neglect of duty", or "malfeasance".

== Passage of law ==
The House passed the 1985 bill by a vote of 271–154 and the Senate by 61–31, and President Ronald Reagan signed the bill on December 12, 1985.

On August 12, 1986, Representative Dan Rostenkowski introduced the Balanced Budget and Emergency Deficit Control Reaffirmation Act. The Senate passed the bill with two amendments by a vote of 36–35, and the House approved the Senate's first amendment by voice vote but rejected the second amendment. The Senate rescinded that amendment by voice vote and President Reagan signed the bill on August 21.

== Legacy ==
The process for determining the amount of the automatic cuts was found unconstitutional in the case of Bowsher v. Synar, (478 U.S. 714 (1986)) as an unconstitutional usurpation of executive power by Congress because the Comptroller General's function under the Act is the "very essence" of execution of the laws, which is beyond the power of a legislative body. It was noted: "Once Congress passes legislation, it can influence only its execution by passing new laws or through impeachment."

Congress enacted a reworked version of the law in the 1987 Act. Gramm–Rudman failed, however, to prevent large budget deficits.

The Budget Enforcement Act of 1990 supplanted the fixed deficit targets, which replaced sequestration with a PAYGO system, which was in effect until 2002.

Balanced budgets did not actually emerge until the late 1990s when budget surpluses (not accounting for liabilities to the Social Security Trust Fund) emerged. The budgets quickly fell out of balance after 2000 and have run consistent and substantial deficits since then.

== See also ==
- Budget deficit
- Separation of powers
