= Unobtainium =

Rare or fictional material

Unobtainium (or unobtanium) is a term used in fiction, engineering, and common situations for a material ideal for a particular application but impractically difficult or impossible to obtain. Unobtainium originally referred to materials that do not exist at all, but can also be used to describe real materials that are unavailable due to extreme rarity or cost. It can also be used to refer to a device rather than a material.

The properties of any particular example of unobtainium depend on the intended use. For example, a pulley made of unobtainium might be massless and frictionless. But for a nuclear rocket, unobtainium might have the needed qualities of lightness, strength at high temperatures, and resistance to radiation damage; a combination of all three qualities is impossible with today's materials. The concept of unobtainium is often applied flippantly or humorously.

The word unobtainium derives humorously from unobtainable, with -ium, a suffix used in many chemical element names. (Note: It predates the similar-sounding systematic element names, such as ununennium, unbinilium, unbiunium, and unbiquadium.) An alternative spelling, unobtanium, is sometimes used, by analogy to the names of real elements like titanium and uranium.

== Engineering origin ==
Since the late 1950s, aerospace engineers have used the term unobtainium when referring to unusual or costly materials, or when theoretically considering a material perfect for their needs in all respects, except that it does not exist.

Unobtainium, n. A substance having the exact high test properties required for a piece of hardware or other item of use, but not obtainable either because it theoretically cannot exist or because technology is insufficiently advanced to produce it. Humorous or ironical.

— Listed in "Interim Glossary, Aero-Space Terms," as compiled by Woodford Heflin and published in February 1958 by the Air University of the US Air Force.

By the 1990s, the term was in wide use, even in formal engineering papers such as "Towards unobtainium [new composite materials for space applications]."

The term may well have been coined in the aerospace industry to refer to materials capable of withstanding the extreme temperatures expected in re-entry. Aerospace engineers are frequently tempted to design aircraft which require parts with strength or resilience beyond that of currently available materials.

Later, unobtainium became an engineering term for practical materials that really exist, but are difficult to get. For example, during the development of the SR-71 Blackbird spy plane, Lockheed engineers at the "Skunk Works" under Clarence "Kelly" Johnson used unobtainium to refer to titanium. Titanium allowed a higher strength-to-weight ratio at the high temperatures the Blackbird would reach, but its availability was restricted because the Soviet Union controlled its supply. This created a problem for the U.S. during the Cold War because the Blackbird required huge amounts of titanium; subsequent U.S. military aircraft such as the B-1 Lancer, F-15 Eagle, F/A-18 Hornet, and F-22 Raptor required relatively large amounts of it as well.

== Contemporary popularization ==
Unobtainium has been used to denote an object that actually exists, but which is very hard to obtain either because of high price (sometimes referred to as unaffordium) or limited availability. It usually refers to a very high-end and desirable product. By the 1970s, the term had migrated from the aerospace industry to the Southern California automobile and motorcycle cultures and, began to appear in industry publications such as early advertisements for Oakley motorcycle handgrips.

Other examples are rear cassettes in the mountain biking community, parts that are no longer available for old-car enthusiasts, parts for reel-to-reel audio-tape recorders, and rare vacuum tubes such as the 1L6 or WD-11 that can now cost more than the equipment in which they were fitted. The eyewear and fashion wear company Oakley, Inc. also frequently denotes the material used for many of their eyeglass nosepieces and earpieces, which has the unusual property of increasing tackiness and thus grip when wet, as unobtanium.

By 2010, the term had been used in mainstream news reports to describe the commercially useful rare earth elements (particularly terbium, erbium, dysprosium, yttrium, and neodymium), which are essential to the performance of consumer electronics and green technology, but whose projected demand far outstrips their current supply.

There have been repeated attempts to attribute the name to a real material. Space elevator research has long used unobtainium to describe a material with the necessary characteristics, but carbon nanotubes might have these characteristics.

== Science fiction ==
Unobtainium was mentioned briefly in David Brin's 1983 book Startide Rising, as a material that could be used in making weapons and comprising 1% of the core of one of the exomoons of the Kthsemenee system.

Unobtainium is briefly mentioned in Wil McCarthy's The Collapsium (2000), where a programmable quantum-technology material called wellstone can simulate any conceivable element, including "imaginary substances like unobtainium, impossibilium, and rainbow kryptonite".

In the 2003 film The Core, Unobtainium is the nickname of a 37-syllable long tungsten-titanium crystal alloy developed by Dr. Edward "Braz" Brazzelton that is able to absorb the extreme pressure and heat of the Earth's molten core and then convert these into usable energy; it's used in building the super resistant outer shell of the ship Virgil.

In the 2009 film Avatar, Unobtanium is the common name of a rare-earth mineral found exclusively on the exomoon Pandora, highly prized (and priced) because of its application as a powerful superconductor material. Because of its unusual magnetic properties, entire mountains with high concentrations of unobtanium levitate in the atmosphere of Pandora.

In the 2011 engineering television series Stuck with Hackett, Hackett uses the term obtainium to describe found materials to be repurposed.

== Similar terms ==
The term eludium has been used to describe a material which has "eluded" attempts to develop it, with the variant spelling illudium derived from illusion. This was mentioned in several Looney Tunes cartoons, where Marvin the Martian tried (unsuccessfully) to use his "Eludium Q-36 Explosive Space Modulator" to blow up the Earth.

Another largely synonymous term is wishalloy, although the sense is often subtly different in that a wishalloy usually does not exist at all, whereas unobtainium may merely be unavailable.

A similar conceptual material in alchemy is the philosopher's stone, a mythical substance with the ability to turn lead into gold, or bestow immortality and youth. While the search to find such a substance was not successful, it did lead to discovery of a new element: phosphorus.

In architecture, the term renderite has been used to describe the use of unrealistic materials in concept renders.

== See also ==
- List of fictional elements, materials, isotopes and subatomic particles
- Dysprosium, a real element whose name means "hard to get"
- Extended periodic table
- Materials science in science fiction
