= 1L6 =

Vacuum tube

The 1L6 is a 7 pin miniature vacuum tube of the pentagrid converter type. It was developed in the United States by Sylvania. It is very similar electrically to its predecessors, the Loktal-based 1LA6 and 1LC6. Released in 1949 for the Zenith Trans-Oceanic shortwave portable radio, this tube was in commercial production until the early 1960s.

== Purpose and design ==
The 1L6 was to be a specialty tube, produced in small quantities by very few manufacturers, mostly Sylvania for use by just a few manufacturers of shortwave portables, such as Zenith - in their Trans-Oceanics - and its short-lived rivals, such as the Hallicrafters TW-1000 and the RCA Strat-O-World and very few others. In fact, Zenith, Crosley and more than a few others used it in many radios. 1L6 based multi-band radios were made by Crosley, Airline (Montgomery Ward house-brand), Silvertone (Sears house brand), Hallicrafters, FADA, and several others. When the US military commissioned two versions of the Trans-Oceanics, they stockpiled 1L6s in the uncounted thousands, some of which still show up at surplus sales.

It was offered to Zenith by Sylvania in place of the larger 1LA6 - for which Zenith made production line changes as the first Miniature-Tube T/O was starting production. The original G500 chassis was punched for a Locktal socket, Zenith changed the phenolic wafer socket to accommodate the smaller tube. NOTE: a 1LA6 (or a 1LC6) will work as a near drop-in replacement for the 1L6 with the use of an adapter socket.

== European analog ==
The closest European analog to the 1L6 is the DK92.

== See also ==
- List of vacuum tubes
