= 25L6 =

Octal-based beam tetrode vacuum tube

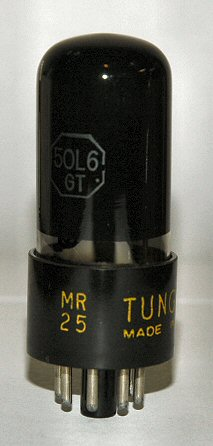
50L6GT by Tung Sol

The 25L6 is an octal-based vacuum tube of the Beam tetrode type. It is the Octal base equivalent to the type '43 power tube which made early AC-powered loudspeaker radios affordable. It found common application in AC/DC radio receivers - such as those of the All American Five type - and was also found in large numbers in early computers, such as the UNIVAC I.

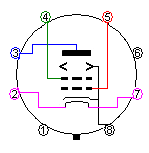
The EIA 7AC pinout

The tube used EIA base 7AC in common with many other power tubes. The tube was identical in design and ratings with the 50L6 with the exception of having a 25 volt 300 mA heater, whereas the 50L6 has a 50 volt 150 mA heater. The 12L6 and identical 12W6 were made with a 12 volt, 600 mA heater, and the 6W6 was made with a 6.3V, 1200mA heater. There was also a 35L6 with a 35V, 150 mA heater. Because of the slightly lower-power heater, the 35L6 has slightly lower output than the rest of the family.

This family is not to be confused with the 6L6, which has the same basing diagram, but has more than twice the power capability of the 25L6.

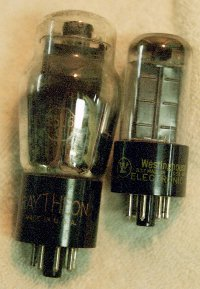
Size comparison of a 25L6G with a 25L6GT

The 25L6 was introduced as a metal tube on November 4, 1936, but most examples of this family were made of glass. The ST14 glass 25L6G came out on March 30, 1937. The T9 size GT version came out on April 11, 1938. There was also a 25L6G in the smaller ST-12 glass envelope.

Computer equipment used this tube as a relay driver or to run the solenoids in key punch machines. The heater in this case ran off the 24 volt power line in the equipment, resulting in long life and slightly lower power output. The industrial type 6046 is a 25L6GT rated for that application.

== See also ==
- All American Five
