= Personal budget =

Plan for the coordination of income and expenses

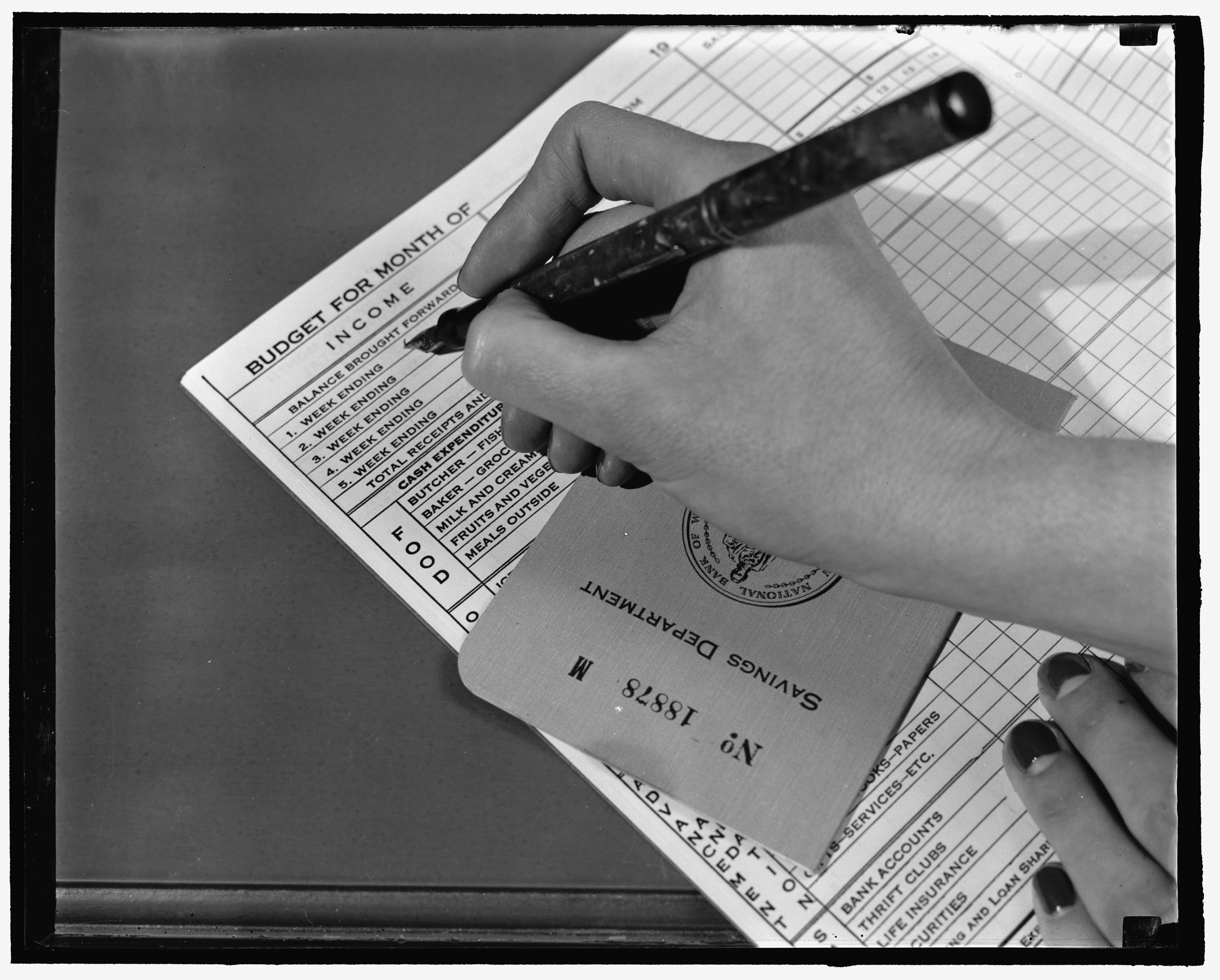
A person keeping a written budget

A personal budget (for an individual) or household budget (for a group sharing a household) is a plan for the coordination of income and expenses.

== Purpose ==
Personal budgets are usually created to help an individual or a household of people to control their spending and achieve their financial goals. Having a budget can help people feel more in control of their finances and make it easier for them to not overspend and to save money. People who budget their money are less likely to amass large debts, are more likely to lead comfortable lives in retirement, and are better prepared for emergencies.

== Methods of personal budgeting ==
In the most basic form of creating a personal budget the person needs to calculate their net income, track their spending over a set period of time, set goals based on the information previously gathered, make a plan to achieve these goals, and adjust their spending based on the plan. There exist many methods of budgeting to help people do this.

=== 50/30/20 budget ===
The 50/30/20 budget is a simple plan that sorts personal expenses into three categories: "needs" (basic necessities), "wants", and savings. 50% of one's net income then goes towards needs, 30% towards wants, and 20% towards savings.

=== Pay yourself first method (80/20 budget) ===
In the pay yourself first budget people first save at least 20% of their net income, and then freely spend the remaining 80%. They can also choose a 70/30, 60/40, or 50/50 budget for more savings. The most important part of this method is to put one's savings apart before spending on anything else.

==== Sub-savings accounts method ====
This method is a variation of the pay yourself first budget, in which people create multiple savings accounts, each for one specific goal (such as a vacation or a new car), and each with an amount of money that should be reached by a specific date. They then divide the amount of money needed by the timeline to calculate how much they should save each month.

=== Envelope method (cash-only budgeting) ===
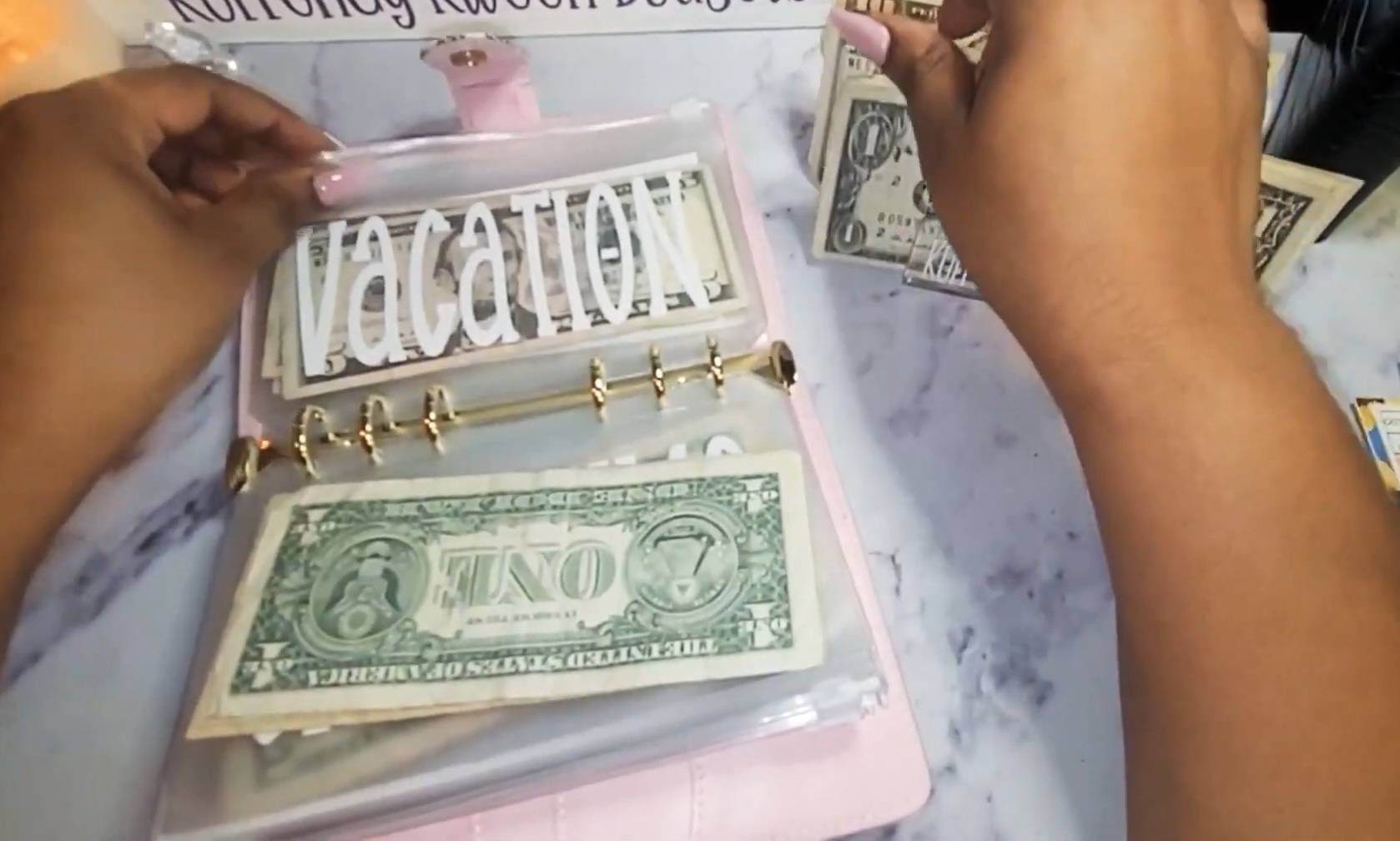
A person using the envelope system, putting aside money into a ring binder of labelled plastic envelopes

For this method, people need to use cash instead of debit or credit cards. They need to allocate their net income into categories (such as groceries), withdraw the cash allocated for each category, and put them into envelopes. Any time they want to buy something in one of the categories, they only take the designated envelope so that they cannot overspend.

=== Zero-based budgeting ===
In zero-based budgeting, all of one's net income must be allocated ahead of spending. Zero-based budgeting involves dividing income into different expense categories, ensuring that all funds have been assigned a purpose, and at the end of the month there is a zero balance in the budget.

=== Kakeibo (Household financial ledger) ===
In this method, users keep a paper notebook or digital ledger in which all take-home earnings are logged along outgoing expenses. Users determine how much money they have to spend, log fixed expenses, determine how much is left for discretionary (variable amount) spending, and track that discretionary spending into four broad categories: needs, wants, cultural, unexpected. Users also set themselves a savings goal for the month and note how they intend to achieve the goal. All discretionary spending transactions are promptly logged. Each week finishes with an accounting of spending, and the end of the month finishes with a final accounting, and notes about lessons learned and/or ways to improve. The prompt logging of expenditures and answering the questions related to it encourage mindfulness and reduction of impulse buys.

== Personal budgets and social care ==
Personal budgets are also used by public authorities as a means of giving individuals or households autonomy over how they spend money they are entitled to for their care needs. These can also be referred to as direct payments. Personal budgets are widely use by local authorities to give people control over decisions about how their social care and other support needs are met. For example, an individual with social care needs might use their personal budget to buy equipment not provided by the NHS, transport costs, for a personal assistant to help with everyday care needs or to arrange respite care. In 2024 the Centre for Homelessness Impact began an evaluation of the impact of personal budgets for people experiencing homelessness. It conducted a randomised controlled trial to compare outcomes from a group of 360 people who received financial support via personal budgets with those from an otherwise identical group who did not. Findings are expected to be published in 2026.

== Software ==
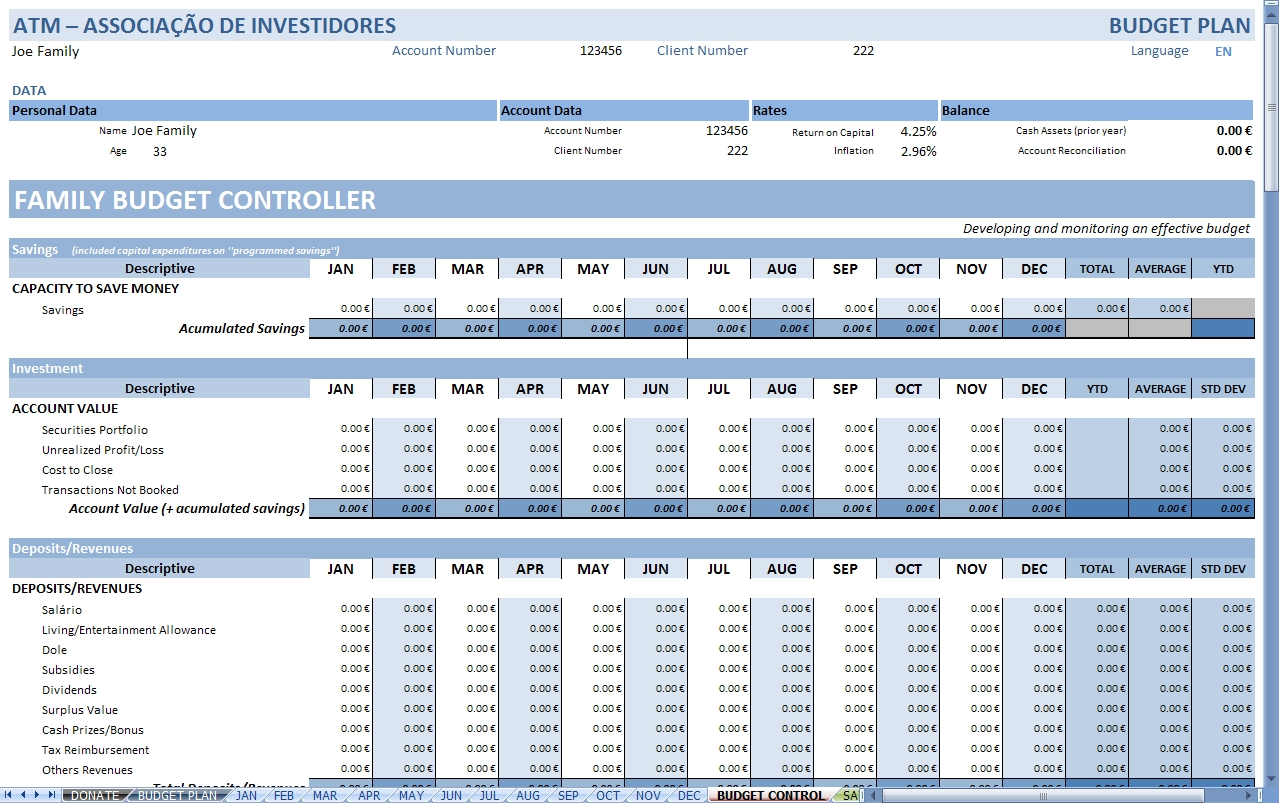
Personal budget in an Excel sheet

Several personal finance software and mobile applications have been developed to help people with managing their money. Some of them can be used for budgeting and expense tracking, others mainly for one's investment portfolio. There are both free and paid options.
