= Omnibus Budget Reconciliation Act of 1990 =

US federal law

- Other short titles: Agricultural Reconciliation Act of 1990; Airport Noise and Capacity Act of 1990; Aviation Safety and Capacity Expansion Act of 1987; Budget Enforcement Act of 1990; Child Care and Development Block Grant Act of 1990; Coastal Zone Act Reauthorization Amendments of 1987; Computer Matching and Privacy Protection Amendments of 1990; FDIC Assessment Rate Act of 1990; Federal Aviation Administration Research, Engineering, and Development Authorization Act of 1990; Federal Credit Reform Act of 1990; Pollution Prevention Act of 1990; Portability of Benefits for Nonappropriated Fund Employees Act of 1990; Revenue Reconciliation Act of 1990; Student Loan Default Prevention Initiative Act of 1990
- Long title: An Act to provide for reconciliation pursuant to section 4 of the concurrent resolution on the budget for fiscal year 1991.
- Nicknames: Abandoned Mine Reclamation Act of 1990
- Enacted by: the 101st United States Congress
- Effective: November 5, 1990

Citations
- Public law: 101–508
- Statutes at Large: 104 Stat. 1388

Legislative history
- Introduced in the House as H.R. 5835 by Leon Panetta (D–CA) on October 15, 1990; Committee consideration by House Budget; Passed the House on October 16, 1990 (227–203 Roll call vote 475, via Clerk.House.gov); Passed the Senate on October 19, 1990 (54–46 Roll call vote 292, via Senate.gov, in lieu of S. 3209); Reported by the joint conference committee on October 27, 1990; agreed to by the House on October 27, 1990 (228–200 Roll call vote 528, via Clerk.House.gov) and by the Senate on October 27, 1990 (54–45 Roll call vote 326, via Senate.gov); Signed into law by President George H. W. Bush on November 5, 1990

The Omnibus Budget Reconciliation Act of 1990 (OBRA-90; Pub. L. 101–508, 104 Stat. 1388, enacted November 5, 1990) is a United States statute enacted pursuant to the budget reconciliation process to reduce the United States federal budget deficit. The Act included the Budget Enforcement Act of 1990 which established the "pay-as-you-go" or "PAYGO" process for discretionary spending and taxes.

The Act was signed into law by President George H. W. Bush on November 5, 1990, counter to his 1988 campaign promise not to raise taxes. This became an issue in the presidential election of 1992.

== Provisions ==
The Act increased individual income tax rates. The top statutory tax rate increased from 28% to 31%, and the individual alternative minimum tax rate increased from 21% to 24%. The capital gains rate was capped at 28%. The value of high income itemized deductions was limited: reduced by 3% times the extent to which AGI exceeds $100,000. It temporarily created the personal exemption phase out applicable to the range of taxable income between $150,000 and $275,000.

Itemized deductions were temporarily limited until 1995. The payroll tax rate increased. The cap on taxable wages for hospital insurance (Medicare) was raised from $53,400 to $125,000. Social security taxes to state and local employees was extended without other pension coverage. A supplemental 0.2% unemployment insurance surtax was imposed.

The act imposed a 30% excise tax on the amount of price over $30,000 for autos, $100,000 for boats, $250,000 for airplanes, and $10,000 for furs. It also increased motor fuels taxes by 5 cents per gallon, and increased taxes on tobacco and alcoholic beverages: by 8 cents per pack of cigarettes, by $1.00 per proof gallon of liquor; by 16 cents per six-pack of beer; and by 18 cents per bottle of table wine. It extended Airport and Airway Trust Fund taxes, increasing them by 25%, and permanently extended the 3% federal telephone excise tax on telephone service.

The Act gave states permission to create Drug Utilization Review ("DUR") boards to manage state specific drug purchasing and formulary decisions for state purchased health care such as Medicaid programs, injured workers programs, and state employee benefits. As a result, these boards (now sometimes called "Pharmacy and Therapeutics" committees), define lists of drugs classes and drugs within those classes in which no drug on the list is felt to be anymore effective or less safe than another. This decision is made by a body of independent physicians and pharmacists who are not seen as having a financial conflict of interest. The Act stipulates the decision must be made in conjunction with a compilation of evidence, as well as public comment, to generate the class wide drug comparison. Once the drug makes the list, it can also be chosen as a "preferred drug". Preferred drugs are typically cheap generic drugs. The Act specified that pharmacists can substitute for a preferred drug, (if one exists in that state), and must offer counseling to the patient on the substitution. The Act also allows drugs listed as preferred to be eligible for "sealed non-transparent rebates" to occur from the manufacturer of the drug to the state agency. These are legally sanctioned kickbacks in which the public by federal law does not have a right to know the amount of the rebate below the average wholesale price (AWP). In cases where "no sufficient evidence exists" a drug is any less safe, (according to the evidence report) the drug is declared "substitutable", and eligible for placement on the PDL, and for the supplemental rebate program.
