= Pay as you go (social program financing) =

Public budgetary policy

Pay as you go (PAYGO) is the practice of financing expenditures with funds that are currently available rather than borrowed.

== Budgeting ==
The PAYGO rule compels new spending or tax changes not to add to the federal debt, which is not to be confused with pay-as-you-go financing, which is when a government saves up money to fund a specific project. Under the PAYGO rules, a new proposal must either be "budget neutral" or offset with savings derived from existing funds. The goal of this is to require those in control of the budget to engage in the diligence of prioritizing expenses and exercising fiscal restraint.

An important example of such a system is the use of PAYGO in both the statutes of the U.S. Government and the rules in the U.S. Congress. First enacted as part of the Budget Enforcement Act of 1990 (which was incorporated as Title XIII of the Omnibus Budget Reconciliation Act of 1990), PAYGO required all increases in direct spending or revenue decreases to be offset by other spending decreases or revenue increases. It was thought that this would control increases in deficit spending. Direct spending (or "mandatory spending") is largely composed of "entitlement spending," which means that a group of beneficiaries are entitled to a benefit and, without further legislative action, the government must provide that benefit—hence it is considered to be "mandatory." Only by legislative action can the benefit be either expanded or reduced. If a benefit is expanded or increased, that increase in direct spending must be offset by an increase in revenue or a decrease in direct spending.

In terms of revenue, PAYGO is designed to control revenue reductions. If revenue is estimated to be reduced through a reduction in tax rates of any kind or other effects on revenue collected by the Federal Government, that effect on the deficit must be offset either through increased tax rates or increase in revenue collection elsewhere, or spending reductions of the same amount.

=== History in the United States ===
==== Statutory PAYGO (1990–2002) ====
In the initial PAYGO regimen, enacted in the Omnibus Budget Reconciliation Act of 1990 (OBRA '90), by statutory requirement, if legislation enacted during a session of Congress had the effect of increasing the projected debt for the following year, a "sequestration" would be triggered. A sequestration is an across the board spending reduction of non-exempt mandatory programs to offset this increase in the deficit, as calculated by the Office of Management and Budget.

These rules were in effect from FY1991–FY2002. Enacted in 1990, it was extended in the Omnibus Budget Reconciliation Act of 1993 and the Balanced Budget Act of 1997. In FY 1991, the Federal deficit was 4.5% of GDP, and by FY 2000, the Federal surplus was 2.4%. Total Federal spending as a percentage of GDP decreased each year from FY1991 through FY 2000, falling from 22.3% to 18.4%. Deficits, though, returned by the last year PAYGO was in effect: There was a "return to deficits ($158 billion, 1.5% of GDP) in 2002".

Beginning in 1998, in response to the first federal budget surplus since 1969, Congress started enacting, and the President signing, increases in discretionary spending above the statutory limit using creative means such as advance appropriations, delays in making obligations and payments, emergency designations, and specific directives. While staying within the technical definition of the law, this allowed spending that otherwise would not be allowed. The result was emergency spending of $34 billion in 1999 and $44 billion in 2000.

==== PAYGO not in effect (2003–2006) ====
The PAYGO statute expired at the end of 2002. After this, Congress enacted President George W. Bush's proposed 2003 tax cuts (enacted as the Jobs and Growth Tax Relief Reconciliation Act of 2003), and the Medicare Prescription Drug, Improvement, and Modernization Act. The White House acknowledged that the new Medicare prescription drug benefit plan would not meet the PAYGO requirements:

Any law that would reduce receipts or increase direct spending is subject to the PAYGO requirements of the Balanced Budget and Emergency Deficit Control Act and could cause a sequester of mandatory programs in any fiscal year through 2006. The requirement to score PAYGO costs expires on September 30, 2002, and there are no discretionary caps beyond 2002. Preliminary CBO estimates indicate that the bill would increase direct spending by $440 billion over the next ten years. The Administration will work with Congress to ensure fiscal discipline consistent with the President's Budget and a quick return to a balanced budget. The Administration also will work with Congress to ensure that any unintended sequester of spending does not occur.

After the expiration of PAYGO, budget deficits returned. The federal surplus shrank from $236.2 billion in 2000 to $128.2 billion in 2001, then a $157.8 billion deficit in 2002—the last year statutory PAYGO was in effect. The budget deficit increased to $377.6 billion in 2003 and $412.7 billion in 2004. The federal budget deficit excluding trust funds was $537.3 billion in FY2006. In the first 6 years of President Bush's term, with a Republican controlled Congress, the federal debt increased by $3 trillion. The public debt continued to grow after Democrats gained control of Congress on January 3, 2007. At the end of the Bush administration, public debt had nearly doubled from when President Bush took office in January 2001, to January 2009.

==== PAYGO as House rule (2007–2010) ====
The PAYGO system was reestablished as a standing rule of the House of Representatives (Clause 10 of Rule XXI) on January 4, 2007, by the Democratic-controlled 110th Congress:

It shall not be in order to consider any bill, joint resolution, amendment, or conference report if the provisions of such measure affecting direct spending and revenues have the net effect of increasing the deficit or reducing the surplus for either the period comprising the current fiscal year and the five fiscal years beginning with the fiscal year that ends in the following calendar year or the period comprising the current fiscal year and the ten fiscal years beginning with the fiscal year that ends in the following calendar year.

Less than one year later though, facing widespread demand to ease looming tax burdens caused by the Alternative Minimum Tax, Congress abandoned its pay-go pledge. The point of order was also waived for the Economic Stimulus Act of 2008 which included revenue reducing provisions and increases in spending that increased the deficit, which paygo was designed to prevent. It was again waived in May 2008, upon the consideration of the 2007 U.S. Farm Bill by the House of Representatives. In this last bill, the advocates of the measure claimed that it was in compliance. However, the Rules Committee issued a report indicating at least a technical violation: "While there is a technical violation of clause 10 of rule XXI [paygo], the conference report complies with the rule by remaining budget neutral with no net increase in direct spending."

At the beginning of the 111th Congress, PAYGO was modified by including an "emergency" exemption. This designation was provided for the American Recovery and Reinvestment Act of 2009, which increased the deficit and increased the public debt limit to $12.104 trillion. Both direct spending in the bill and tax cuts, as passed by the Democratic-controlled Congress and signed by President Barack H. Obama, were exempted from the PAYGO rule under section 5(b) of the Act. The establishment of the House PAYGO Rule, and a similar Rule in the Senate, did not prevent the deficit from growing to $1.42 trillion for fiscal year 2009.

The PAYGO point of order does not apply to "direct spending" if it is incorporated into an annual or supplemental appropriations spending bill. The difference between direct spending and annual appropriations is that the former becomes permanent law with U.S. government spending on various entitlements that continues until the government acts to increase or reduce it. An annual appropriation bill provides spending authority to the government for a project or program that only lasts a year. PAYGO was designed to apply to direct spending only. So, a way of circumventing the point of order is to include the direct spending increases in an annual appropriation bill, which was done for the Supplemental Appropriations Act of 2009.

==== Return of statutory PAYGO (2010–present) ====
On February 12, 2010, Obama signed statutory PAYGO rules into law.

==== Administrative PAYGO (2019–present) ====
Executive Order 13893 of President Trump on 10 October 2019 was the first implementation. The Administrative Pay-As-You-Go Act of 2023 (Fiscal Responsibility Act of 2023) signed by Joe Biden implements statutory PAYGO for administrative actions.

== Social insurance ==
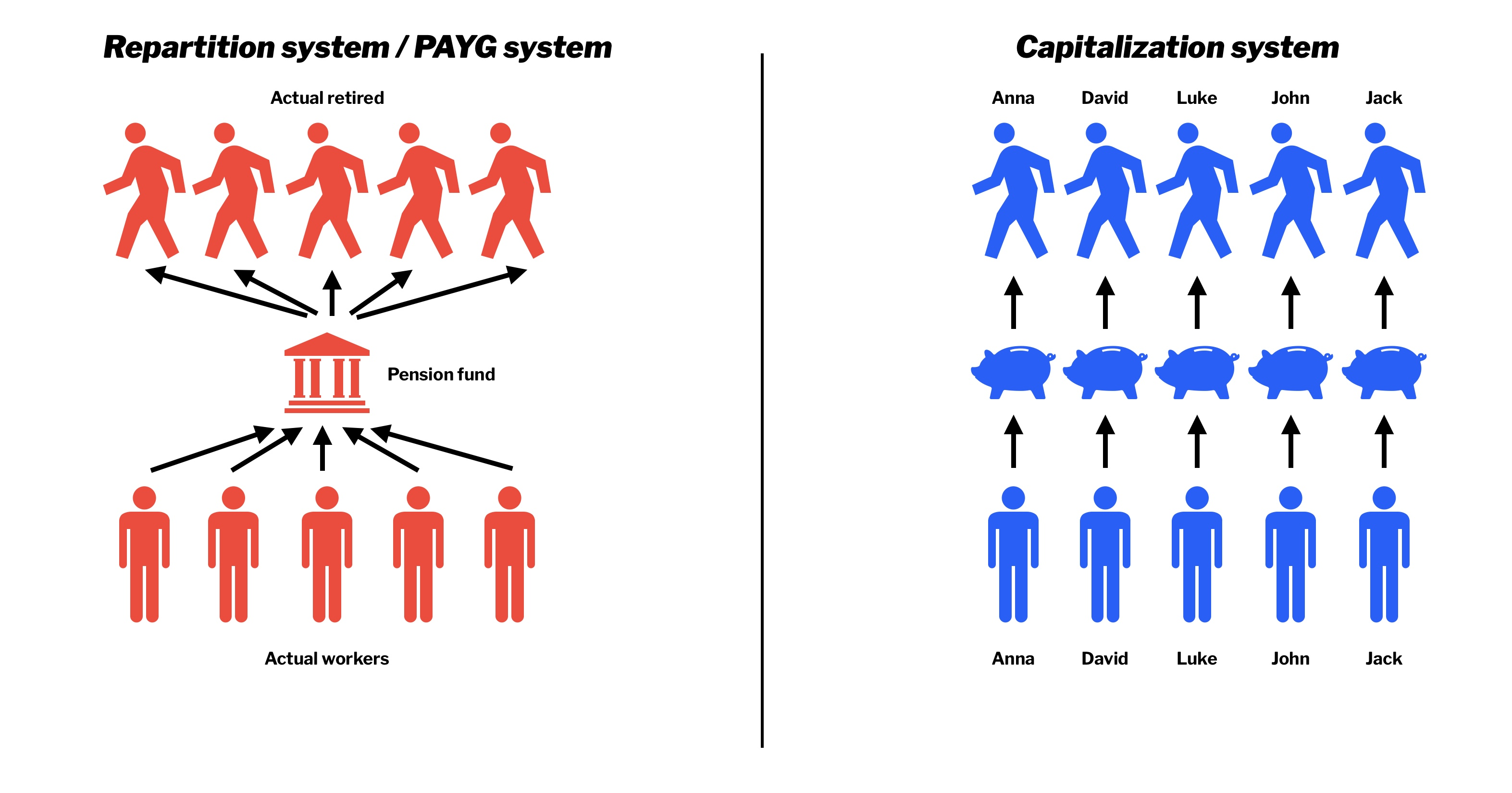
The main difference between the repartition/PAYGO system and a capitalization one.

In social insurance, PAYGO refers to an unfunded system in which current contributors to the system pay the expenses for the current recipients. In a pure PAYGO system, no reserves are accumulated and all contributions are paid out in the same period. The opposite of a PAYGO system is a funded system, in which contributions are accumulated and paid out later (together with the interest on it) when eligibility requirements are met.

=== U.S. Social Security ===
An important example of such a PAYGO system in this second sense is Social Security in the U.S. In that system, contributions are paid by the currently employed population in the form of the Federal Insurance Contributions Act tax (FICA), while recipients are mostly individuals of at least 62 years of age. Social Security is not a pure PAYGO system, because it theoretically accumulates excess revenue in the Old-Age, Survivors, and Disability Insurance Trust Funds (OASDI). In practice, however, excess revenue has previously been used for other government spending while the Trust Funds are simply accounting vehicles for money owed by the Treasury. Moreover, Social Security costs have exceeded revenue since 2010.

=== German pension system ===
Another example for PAYGO is the German pension system. Employees have to pay into the pension system while they are working. The funds are immediately re-distributed. The amount paid into the system depends on the income and gives the payers so called "wage points" (de: Entgeltpunkte). The medium income would give one pension point in a year. A maximum of two pension points can be collected per year. Each year the value of one pension point is calculated and pensioners receive money in proportion to their accumulated pension points and the income generated in that year for the whole pensions system.

== See also ==
- Generational accounting
- Statutory Pay-As-You-Go Act of 2010
