= Statutory Pay-As-You-Go Act of 2010 =

- Nicknames: PAYGO
- Enacted by: the 111th United States Congress

Citations
- Public law: Pub. L. 111–139 (text) (PDF)

Legislative history
- Introduced in the United States House of Representatives by Steny Hoyer (D-MD) on April 29, 2009; Passed the United States House of Representatives on April 29, 2009; Passed the United States Senate on 60–39 (January 28, 2010) with amendment; United States House of Representatives agreed to United States Senate amendment on February 4, 2010 (233–187); Signed into law by President Barack Obama on February 12, 2010

The Statutory Pay-As-You-Go Act of 2010, Title I of H.J.Res. 45, is a public law passed by the 111th United States Congress and signed by US President Barack Obama on February 12, 2010. The act reinstated pay-as-you-go budgeting rules used in Congress from 1990 until 2002, ensuring that most new spending is offset by spending cuts or added revenue elsewhere (with several major policy exemptions).

== Legislative history ==
The Act was introduced in the House of Representatives on June 17, 2009, by Majority Leader Steny Hoyer (D-Maryland) and has been cosponsored by 169 of the 257 House Democrats.

The Act had initially passed the House of Representatives 265–166 as a standalone bill in July 2009, then was attached in the Senate to legislation raising the debt limit to $14.3 trillion. A majority of 241 Democrats supported the bill while a majority of 153 Republicans opposed it.

In the Senate, the amendment attaching pay-as-you-go language to the debt-limit increase passed on a party-line vote of 60–40, and the debt-limit bill subsequently passed 60–39.

After the House passed the bill by a vote of 233–187 on February 4, 2010, the bill was sent to Obama's desk. He signed it into law on February 12, 2010.

== Exemptions ==
The Act under section 11 lists out programs and activities exempt from PAYGO rules. Outlays not subject to offsetting revenues include Social Security payments, all programs administered by the Department of Veterans Affairs, net interest on the debt, and income tax credits. Over 150 additional programs, funds, and activities are listed under section 11 as exempt from the law including outlays to Fannie Mae, Freddie Mac, the FDIC, Health Care Trust Funds, the Postal Service Fund, low-rent public housing loans and expenses, and the Special Inspector General for the TARP program.

An example of Congress passing legislation exempt from the PAYGO rules is for emergency disaster relief for Hurricane Sandy. These exemptions allow money to move more quickly through the legislative process without having to find an offset.
