= Widget (economics) =

Abstract name for a unit of production

The word widget is a placeholder word for an object or, more specifically, a mechanical or other manufactured device. It is an abstract unit of production.

The Oxford English Dictionary defines it as "An indefinite name for a gadget or mechanical contrivance, esp. a small manufactured item" and dates this use back to 1931. It states that the origin is "perhaps U.S." and for etymology suggests that it may be a variant of gadget.

The term also appears earlier in George S. Kaufman and Moss Hart's 1924 play Beggar on Horseback. General Motors Corporation sponsored a short film in 1939, "Round and Round", which features widgets throughout.

== Usage ==
When discussing a hypothetical situation, the term is used to represent any type of personal property, with the corresponding term Blackacre used to represent any type of real property. In such use, the widget or Blackacre has whatever characteristics are relevant to the scenario. So, if the object being discussed needs to be a liquid, then the widget is liquid. If it needs to be light, heavy, manufactured, naturally occurring or whatever, the widget has the necessary characteristics. In technology, the term has a variant, gigawidget, which is used to describe an object that is fictitious. The term is also used for obfuscation, if the object's real technology, composition, or purpose is unknown.

Widget is used in texts and speech, especially in the context of accounting, to indicate a hypothetical "any-product". Companies in such texts will frequently be given names such as "ABC Widgets" or "Acme Widget Corp." to indicate that the particular business of the hypothetical company is not relevant to the topic of discussion.

== See also ==
- Acme Corporation
- Gadget
- Metasyntactic variable
