= 2012 United States federal budget =

U.S. budget to fund government operations 2012

2012 Budget of the United States federal government
- Submitted: February 14, 2011
- Submitted by: Barack Obama
- Submitted to: 112th Congress
- Passed: November 18, 2011 (Pub.L. 112-55); December 23, 2011 (Pub.L. 112-74 and Pub.L. 112-77)
- Country: United States
- Total revenue: $2.627 trillion (requested) $2.45 trillion (actual); 15.3% of GDP (actual)
- Total expenditures: $3.729 trillion (requested) $3.537 trillion (actual); 22.1% of GDP (actual)
- Deficit: $1.101 trillion (requested); 7.0% of GDP $1.087 trillion (actual); 6.8% of GDP (actual)
- Debt: $16.65 Trillion (requested); 105.3% of GDP $16.05 Trillion (actual); 100.2% of GDP
- GDP: $16.026 trillion
- Website: US Government Publishing Office

The 2012 United States federal budget was the budget to fund government operations for the fiscal year 2012, which lasted from October 1, 2011, through September 30, 2012. The original spending request was issued by President Barack Obama in February 2011. That April, the Republican-held House of Representatives announced a competing plan, The Path to Prosperity, emboldened by a major victory in the 2010 Congressional elections associated with the Tea Party movement. The budget plans were both intended to focus on deficit reduction, but differed in their changes to taxation, entitlement programs, defense spending, and research funding.

The House resolution did not pass the Senate, nor did the Senate pass a resolution of their own, so there was no 2012 budget of record. The actual appropriations bills for Fiscal Year 2012 included four continuing resolutions and three full-year appropriations bills enacted in November and December 2011, in accordance with the United States budget process. These appropriations were greatly affected by the Budget Control Act of 2011, passed in August 2011 as a resolution to the debt-ceiling crisis; it mandated budget cuts over a ten-year period beginning with Fiscal Year 2012. In addition, legislation was passed to extend a cut in the Social Security payroll tax for the entirety of calendar year 2012.

The government was initially funded through five temporary continuing resolutions. Final funding for the government was enacted as an omnibus spending bill, the Consolidated Appropriations Act, 2012, on December 23, 2011.

== Background ==
In February 2010, President Obama formed the bipartisan Bowles–Simpson Commission to recommend steps that could be taken to reduce future budget deficits. The commission released its report on November 10, 2010, which recommended deep domestic and military spending cuts, reforming the tax system by eliminating many tax breaks in return for lower overall rates, and reducing benefits for Social Security and Medicare. The plan did not receive the supermajority vote within the commission which it needed to be directly sent to Congress, and portions of the plan were rejected by both parties.

== Budget proposals ==
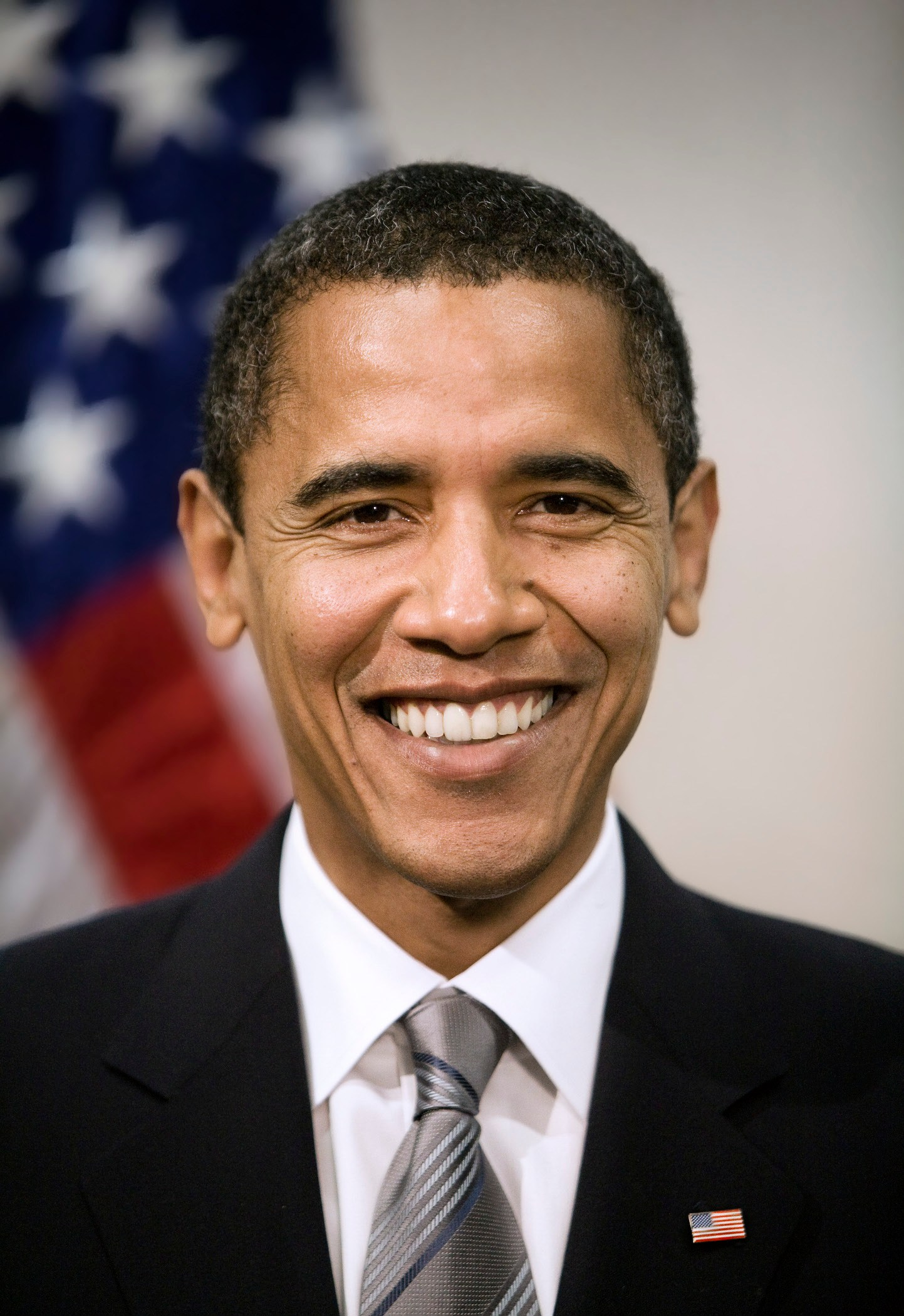
In response to Republican victories in the 2010 Congressional elections, President Barack Obama's administration aimed to reduce annual deficits to more sustainable levels while increasing support in specific areas to foster long-term economic growth in its FY2012 budget proposal.

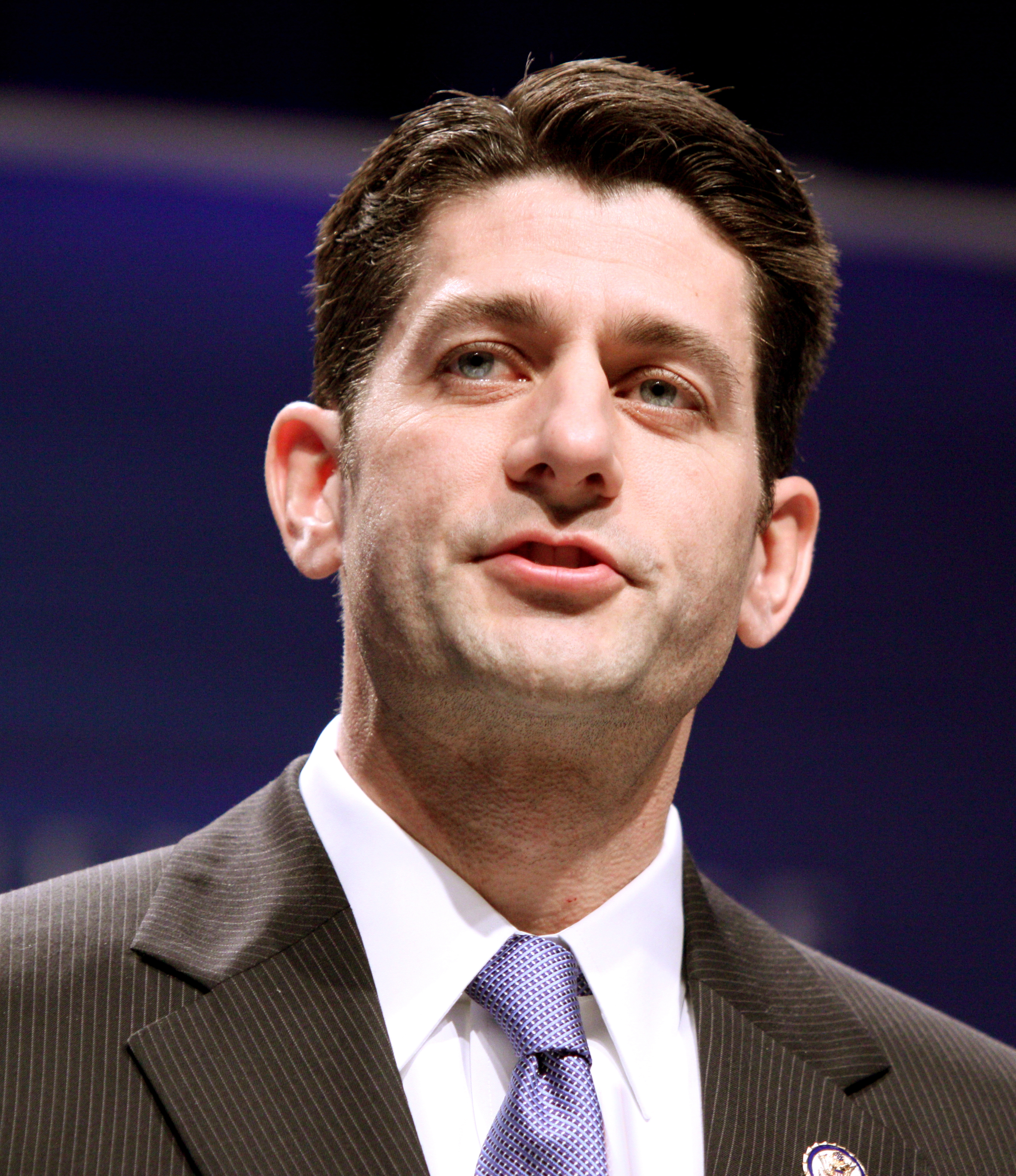
Representative Paul Ryan played a prominent role in drafting and promoting the House Republican proposal for FY2012, The Path to Prosperity. The proposal, often called "the Ryan Plan", has been often referenced by candidates during the 2012 presidential election.

The Obama administration proposed its 2012 budget on February 14, 2011. It aimed to reduce annual deficits to more sustainable levels by making selective cuts in spending, while increasing support in specific areas such as education and clean energy to foster long-term economic growth. The plan did not contain specific proposals to rein in spending on entitlement programs such as Medicare, Medicaid, and Social Security, which were expected to make up much of the increase in the deficit in future years. The budget represented a shift from the Obama administration's strategy in previous years of using increased government spending, such as the American Recovery and Reinvestment Act of 2009, to combat the late 2000s recession. The 2012 budget plan was instead projected to reduce deficits by $1.1 trillion over the next ten years. Republicans criticized the plan for not going far enough to reduce future deficits.

A competing plan, called The Path to Prosperity, was announced by House Republicans, led by House Budget Committee chairman Paul Ryan, on April 5, 2011. This plan would cut $5.8 trillion in spending over ten years, but would also reduce tax income by $4.2 trillion below current projections. The plan would make no further reduction in defense spending beyond the Obama administration's plan, but would make major changes to Medicare, Medicaid, and Social Security, which was expected to pass more of the cost of these programs onto individuals. It would also cut energy research and other applied research and development. This plan was criticized by Democrats for disproportionately cutting programs which benefit the disadvantaged and stifling innovation, while not cutting defense spending further and containing deep tax cuts. The House Republican plan was defeated in the Senate by a margin of 40–57 votes on May 25, 2011, the same day that the Obama budget was also defeated.

In response to the Republican plan and a recent deal on the 2011 budget, President Obama on April 13, 2011, presented an alternative plan in a major policy speech. This new plan would cut deficits by $4 trillion over 12 years through a combination of broad spending cuts and tax increases, including the expiration of the Bush tax cuts for incomes over $200,000 and proposed a cap on increases in Medicare and Medicaid spending, to be paid for by individuals. Obama criticized the Republican plan for enriching the wealthy through tax cuts while placing a greater economic burden on the elderly through Medicare cuts. Obama's plan was criticized by Republicans for its large cuts in defense spending and for its lack of specific detail. On June 23, at a hearing of the Budget Committee, CBO director Douglas Elmendorf was asked what his agency made of the proposals in that presidential address. “We don’t estimate speeches,” he said. “We need much more specificity than was provided in that speech." A motion to proceed on a Republican-sponsored bill meant to represent the original Obama administration budget proposal was defeated in the Senate by a margin of 0–97 votes on May 25, 2011; the lack of Democratic support was said to have been because the original budget had been superseded by Obama's April speech.

== Legislation ==
=== Implications of debt limit deal ===
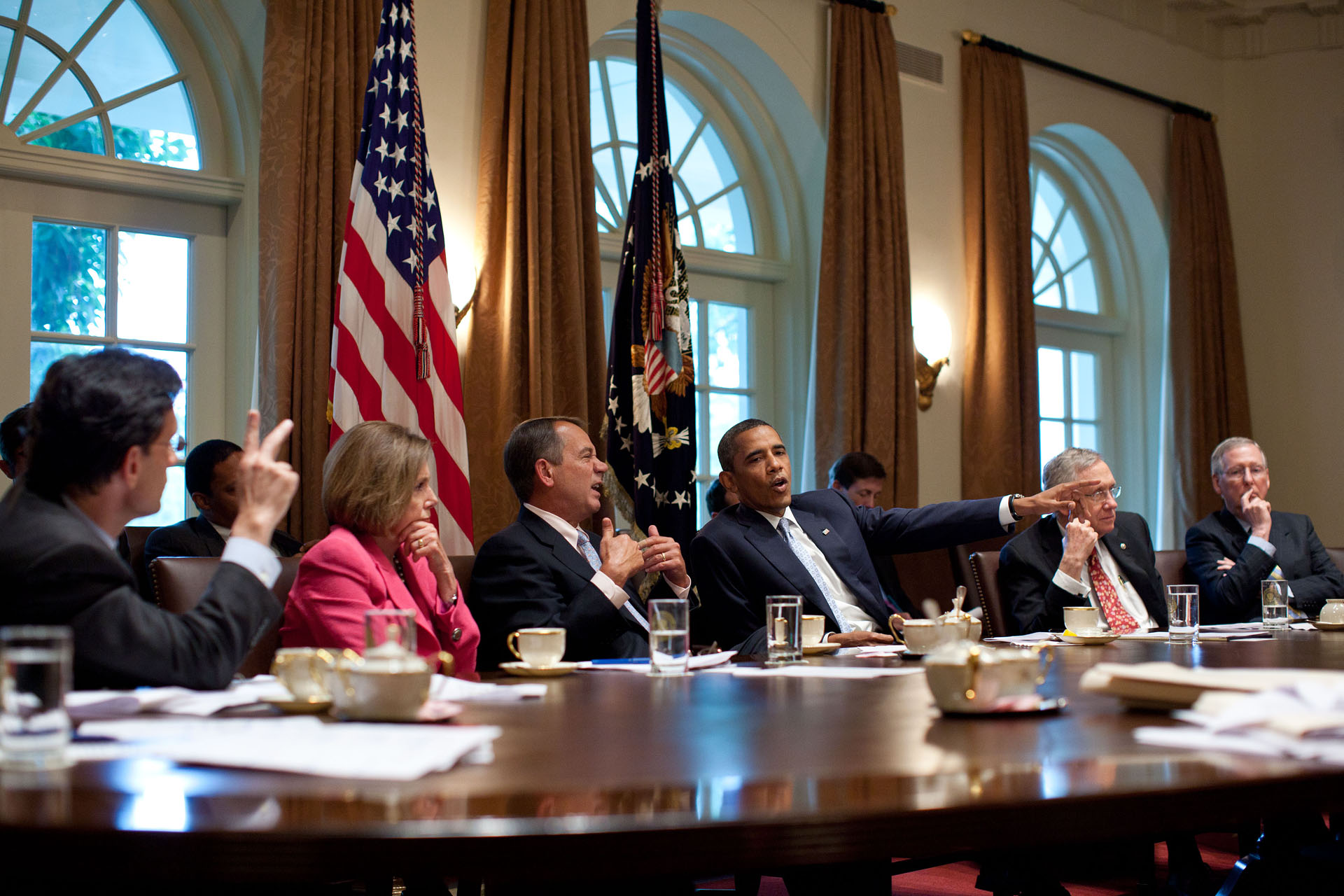
Negotiations throughout July 2011 eventually reached a deal to pass the Budget Control Act, which resolved the United States debt-ceiling crisis in return for significant budget cuts over the following ten years. Pictured is a July 13 negotiation session involving President Barack Obama and Congressional leaders Eric Cantor, Nancy Pelosi, John Boehner, Harry Reid, and Mitch McConnell.

A controversy arose in July 2011 over the raising of the federal debt limit, which was needed to prevent a default by the United States government. Republicans in Congress demanded spending cuts in the budgets for 2012 and subsequent years in return for raising the debt limit. On July 19, 2011, the Republican-led House passed a bill, the Cut, Cap and Balance Act, by a margin of 234–190 which would require $111 billion in cuts in 2012 spending levels, exempting defense, Medicare, and Social Security from these cuts, and would limit subsequent federal spending to about 20% of the gross national product as compared to the current 24%. It did not immediately increase the debt limit, but would have required Congress to pass a Balanced Budget Amendment to the United States Constitution before increasing the debt limit. The bill was tabled by a vote of 51–46 in the Senate on July 22, and thus defeated. An alternate plan proposed by the bipartisan Gang of Six senators and favored by the Obama administration would contain about $3.7 trillion in deficit reduction over the next decade, including both new revenue and large spending cuts, including in entitlement healthcare and defense, failed to gain traction.

Two rival plans were then prepared by the Senate Democrats and House Republicans. The Democratic plan would immediately raise the debt limit by $2.7 trillion, enough to last beyond the 2012 elections, and would decrease spending by $900 billion over ten years. The Republican plan would cut a total of $850 billion over ten years, and would raise the debt limit in two stages: by $1 trillion immediately, enough to last until early 2012, and then would form a bipartisan committee to recommend the second half of the budget cuts, which upon being passed by Congress would increase the debt limit by another $1.6 trillion. Neither plan included revenue increases or cuts to entitlement programs. The vote on the Republican plan was delayed several times as more conservative members of the caucus refused to support it. After being altered to again require passage of a Balanced Budget Amendment before the second stage of debt limit increases, it passed the House 218–210, with 22 Republicans opposing the bill. It was defeated in the Senate two hours later by a vote of 59–41, as the Democratic plan was prepared to be taken up there.

On July 31, 2011, President Obama and the leadership of both legislative chambers reached a deal on the debt limit legislation. The deal guaranteed $2.4 trillion in immediate and eventual debt limit increases. It mandated $917 billion in spending cuts over ten years, of which $21 billion would be included in the FY2012 budget. It would then give Congress a choice between either accepting the recommendation of a Joint Select Committee on Deficit Reduction which would cut the deficit by $1.2–1.5 trillion through spending cuts and/or revenue increases, or accepting automatic budget cuts to national security funding (including defense spending) and to Medicare, which would start in the FY2013 budget. Congress would also be required to vote on a Balanced Budget Amendment. On August 1, the Budget Control Act of 2011 passed the House 269–161, with 66 Republicans and 95 Democrats voting against the bill. On August 2, it passed in the Senate 74–26, and was signed into law by President Obama the same day. August 2 was also the date estimated by the Department of the Treasury that the borrowing authority of the US would be exhausted.

=== Initial continuing resolutions and FEMA controversy ===
The extent of damage caused by Hurricane Irene raised fears that the Federal Emergency Management Agency would run out of funds before the end of FY2011, setting off a debate that threatened to cause a government shutdown in October 2011.

Because the federal budget legislation was not expected to be enacted by the September 30, 2011 deadline, work began on a continuing resolution to fund the government temporarily through November 18, 2011 with an across-the-board reduction of 1.503% below the 2011 budget levels. However, a dispute arose between the Republican-led House and the Democrat-led Senate over the amount of additional funding for the Federal Emergency Management Agency (FEMA) for costs associated with relief from Hurricane Irene, and whether this extra funding should be partially offset with cuts elsewhere. FEMA's disaster relief fund had $792 million remaining in it just prior to the hurricane's landfall in August 2011, which was below the $1 billion thresholds that caused FEMA to act under "immediate-needs status," delaying long-term projects in favor of urgent tasks. The proposed cuts targeted a program to fund development of fuel-efficient automobiles as well as the program that had guaranteed a loan to the recently bankrupt Solyndra corporation. The Senate rejection of the House bill on September 23, 2011, raised the possibility of a government shutdown on October 1.

However, FEMA subsequently determined that the $114 million left in the fund as of late September would suffice for the final week of the fiscal year, and the fund would thus not in fact run out of money. This led to the Senate passing a pair of continuing resolutions on September 26: one lasting until October 4, 2011, to give the then-out-of-session House of Representatives time to consider the second resolution, which funded the government through the first seven weeks of the 2012 fiscal year, until November 18, 2011. The House passed the short-term resolution on September 29, 2011, by unanimous consent in an unusual example of passing legislation during a pro forma session. After the House came back into normal session, the second continuing resolution was passed by a vote of 352–66 on October 4, 2011.

=== Appropriations legislation passed ===
On November 18, 2011, the first appropriations bill was enacted, the Consolidated and Further Continuing Appropriations Act, 2012. It combined the three appropriations bills for Agriculture, Commerce/Justice/Science (CJS), and Transportation/Housing and Urban Development (THUD), and also contained a continuing resolution providing funding for other departments until December 16, 2011.

On December 15, 2011, a deal was reached on the remaining nine appropriations bills, which were combined into the Consolidated Appropriations Act, 2012. One point of contention was that an earlier draft of the bill supported by Republicans contained new restrictions on travel to Cuba, which had been relaxed by the Obama administration in 2009. These restrictions were removed in the enacted bill at the insistence of the Obama administration. A separate Disaster Relief Appropriations Act, 2012 was also included in the package, as well as a concurrent resolution which offset the increased disaster funding by imposing a 1.83% across-the-board spending cut to all discretionary programs except Defense and Veterans Affairs. Two more continuing resolutions were also passed, one extending the deadline by one day so that the Senate could vote on the package, and one until December 23, 2011. The two appropriations bills were enacted on December 23, 2011, but the concurrent resolution failed in the Senate.

On December 17, 2011, the Senate passed legislation to extend the Social Security payroll tax cut which had been previously enacted during the FY2011 budget negotiations. That legislation had reduced the rate from 6.2% to 4.2% for the 2011 calendar year only. The initial 2012 extension was for two months, rather than the full-year extension which had been sought; the legislation also extended unemployment benefits as well as a measure preventing a drop in rates for Medicare reimbursement; the spending for these was offset by enacting new fees on Fannie Mae and Freddie Mac. Points of contention included a Democratic plan to fund the tax cut with a new surtax on income over $1 million, which was dropped in later stages of negotiation, as well as attempts by Republicans to insert language which would speed the approval of the Keystone XL pipeline, which had recently been delayed by the Obama administration. The bill was initially rejected in the House, whose leaders insisted on a full-year extension, despite the fact that the Senate had already adjourned for the year. However, after criticism from other Republicans that the impasse would harm their prospects in the upcoming 2012 elections, the House leadership on December 23, 2011, announced that it would pass the Senate bill in return for Democrats promptly beginning negotiations on a full-year extension. The bill, the Middle Class Tax Relief and Job Creation Act of 2011, was passed by the House and signed by the President later that day.

The tax cut extension for the remainder of the year was passed as the Middle Class Tax Relief and Job Creation Act of 2012 on February 17, 2012, by a vote of 293–132 in the House and 60–36 in the Senate. The bill also contained a further extension of unemployment benefits and the Medicare reimbursement rates. The cost of the tax cut was not offset by spending cuts, but the other provisions were offset by cuts in federal healthcare and pension programs. Republican support for the bill was motivated by a desire to not oppose a tax cut in an election year. Some Democrats criticized the bill for directing spending cuts at federal employees rather than generating funds by increasing taxes on the wealthy or closing tax loopholes.

== Major initiatives ==
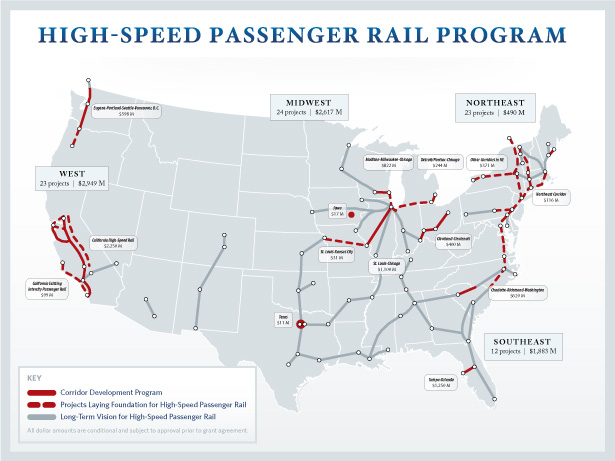
The American Recovery and Reinvestment Act of 2009 had been intended as the first installment of a long-term investment in intercity and high-speed rail, but no funding for new grants was included in the FY2012 budget.

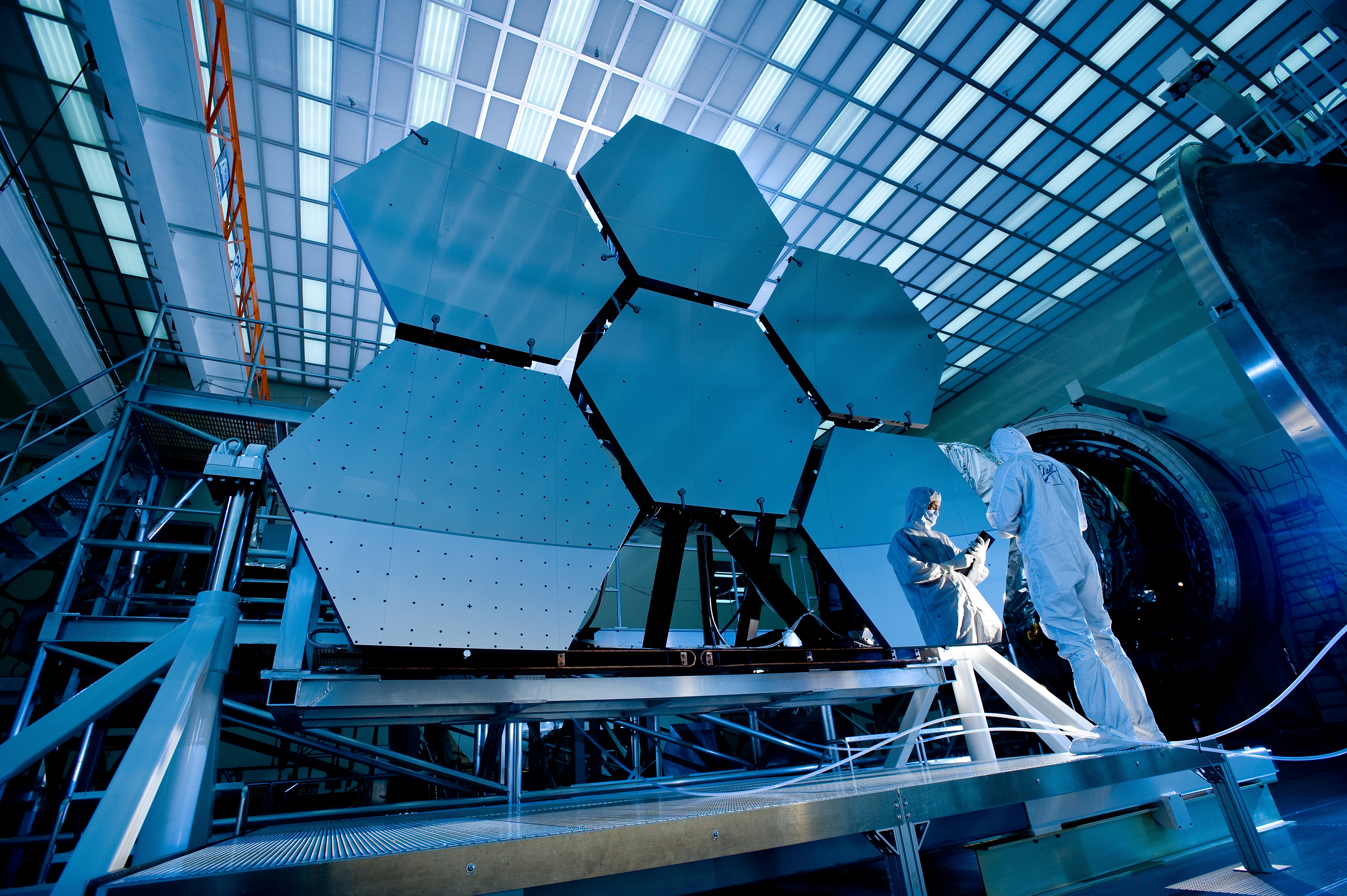
The House version of the budget legislation removed all FY2012 funding for NASA's James Webb Space Telescope, pictured under construction in July 2010. The funding was restored in the enacted version. The telescope is intended to be the successor to the Hubble Space Telescope.

The following provisions were enacted in the final budget legislation:

- No new funding for long-distance intercity and high-speed rail was included in the budget. This funding had originally been introduced as part of the American Recovery and Reinvestment Act stimulus bill in 2009, but had proved controversial as several Republican governors elected in the 2010 elections subsequently rejected the federal funding for rail projects in their states. However, funding for 26 short-distance routes eliminated in the House version was restored in the enacted bill.
- The National Science Foundation's budget was increased 2.5%, to $7.03 billion, and the National Institutes of Health's was increased slightly from $30.4 billion to $30.7 billion. However, the Office of Science and Technology Policy's budget was cut by 32% to $4.5 million, in retaliation for the office allegedly ignoring a provision in 2011 budget legislation banning it from pursuing collaborations with China. Funding for the James Webb Space Telescope, the successor to the Hubble Space Telescope, was maintained, as was funding for the Joint Polar Satellite System.
- The legislation contained a ban on using federal funds to enforce the phase-out of incandescent light bulbs that had been mandated in the Energy Independence and Security Act of 2007, but requires recipients of more than $1 million in Department of Energy grants to comply with the energy efficiency standards.
- Regular funding for the Department of Defense increased from $513 billion to $518 billion, including a 1.6% pay raise for military personnel. Funding for the wars in Iraq and in Afghanistan was reduced from $158 billion to $115 billion.
- Funding for the Race to the Top education program was cut from $698 million to $550 million. A proposal to create an educational technology research and development program, Advanced Research Projects Agency-Education (ARPA-ED), in a similar vein to the successful DARPA research agency within the Department of Defense, was not enacted.
- The Obama administration had requested to create a Climate Service within NOAA, similar to the National Weather Service. This request was not enacted.
- Transfers of prisoners from the Guantanamo Bay detention camp to the United States was prohibited, and language on transfers to other countries was revised.
- The Department of Justice was forbidden from consolidating or maintaining certain firearms records, and it was prohibited for health officials to use federal money to advocate gun control.

== Total revenues and spending ==
The Obama administration's budget request contained $2.627 trillion in revenues and $3.729 trillion in outlays (expenditures) for 2012, for a deficit of $1.101 trillion. The April 2011 Republican plan contained $2.533 trillion in revenues and $3.529 trillion in outlays, for a deficit of $0.996 trillion. The enacted budget contained $2.469 trillion in receipts and $3.796 trillion in outlays, for a deficit of $1.327 trillion.

=== Total receipts ===
2012 actual receipts by source:
1. Individual income tax (46.2%)
2. Social Security/other payroll tax (34.5%)
3. Corporate income tax (9.90%)
4. Deposits of earnings and Federal Reserve System (3.30%)
5. Excise tax (3.20%)
6. Customs duties (1.20%)
7. Estate and gift taxes (0.60%)
8. Other miscellaneous receipts (1.00%)

Source	Requested	Enacted	Actual
Individual income tax	$1,141 billion	$1,165 billion	$1,132 billion
Corporate income tax	$329 billion	$237 billion	$242 billion
Social Security and other payroll tax	$925 billion	$841 billion	$846 billion
Excise tax	$103 billion	$79 billion	$79 billion
Customs duties	$30 billion	$31 billion	$30 billion
Estate and gift taxes	$14 billion	$11 billion	$14 billion
Deposits of earnings and Federal Reserve System	$66 billion	$81 billion	$82 billion
Other miscellaneous receipts	$20 billion	$24 billion	$25 billion
Total	$2.627 trillion	$2.469 trillion	$2.450 trillion

=== Total outlays by agency ===
The Department of Defense budget is divided into two parts: the base budget, and Overseas Contingency Operations which includes the Iraq War and the War in Afghanistan.

Item	Discretionary, requested	Discretionary, enacted	Mandatory, requested	Mandatory, enacted
Social Security Administration	$12.5 billion	$11.7 billion	$804.6 billion	$817.5 billion
Department of Health and Human Services including Medicare and Medicaid	$88.6 billion	$84.2 billion	$804.2 billion	$787.8 billion
Department of Defense including Overseas Contingency Operations	$701.6 billion	$683.0 billion	$5.8 billion	$5.3 billion
Department of Education	$78.9 billion	$79.1 billion	$–8.0 billion	$19.4 billion
Department of Agriculture	$27.6 billion	$28.8 billion	$116.4 billion	$121.9 billion
Department of Veterans Affairs	$58.8 billion	$58.8 billion	$65.6 billion	$70.4 billion
Department of Housing and Urban Development	$49.8 billion	$47.9 billion	$–0.4 billion	$8.9 billion
Department of State and Other International Programs	$62.7 billion	$53.4 billion	$–0.05 billion	$2.6 billion
Department of Homeland Security	$46.3 billion	$58.8 billion	$0.6 billion	$1.6 billion
Department of Energy	$42.5 billion	$42.3 billion	$0.6 billion	$–1.7 billion
Department of Justice	$24.1 billion	$28.8 billion	$9.1 billion	$5.8 billion
National Aeronautics and Space Administration	$18.2 billion	$17.7 billion	$–0.01 billion	$–0.02 billion
Department of Transportation	$27.0 billion	$25.6 billion	$62.6 billion	$58.6 billion
Department of the Treasury	$14.6 billion	$13.5 billion	$114.5 billion	$148.7 billion
Department of the Interior	$13.1 billion	$12.4 billion	$0.8 billion	$–1.1 billion
Department of Labor	$13.7 billion	$14.0 billion	$95.3 billion	$113.1 billion
Department of Commerce	$11.3 billion	$10.9 billion	$1.9 billion	$0.5 billion
Army Corps of Engineers Civil Works	$7.9 billion	$9.3 billion	$0.1 billion	$–0.06 billion
Environmental Protection Agency	$10.2 billion	$9.5 billion	$–0.2 billion	$–0.1 billion
National Science Foundation	$7.6 billion	$8.0 billion	$0.3 billion	$0.2 billion
Small Business Administration	$1.2 billion	$1.4 billion	$–0.007 billion	$1.8 billion
Corporation for National and Community Service	$1.1 billion	$0.8 billion	$0.03 billion	$0.007 billion
Net interest	N/A	N/A	$0.2 billion	$0.2 billion
Disaster costs	$0.006 billion	$<0.005 billion	N/A	N/A
Other spending	$20.7 billion	$19.3 billion	$57.5 billion	$88.0 billion
Total	$1361 billion	$1338 billion	$2140 billion	$2252 billion

=== Total outlays by budget function ===
Function	Title	Requested	Republican proposal	Enacted	Actual
050	National Defense	$737.537 billion	$712 billion	$716.300 billion	$678 billion
150	International Affairs	$63.001 billion	$36 billion	$56.252 billion	$47 billion
250	General Science, Space and Technology	$32.284 billion	$30 billion	$30.991 billion	$29 billion
270	Energy	$29.411 billion	$16 billion	$23.270 billion	$15 billion
300	Natural Resources and Environment	$42.703 billion	$37 billion	$42.829 billion	$42 billion
350	Agriculture	$18.929 billion	$20 billion	$19.173 billion	$18 billion
370	Commerce and Housing Credit	$11.69 billion	$17 billion	$79.624 billion	$41 billion
400	Transportation	$104.854 billion	$80 billion	$102.552 billion	$93 billion
450	Community and Regional Development	$25.701 billion	$24 billion	$31.685 billion	$25 billion
500	Education, Training, Employment and Social Services	$106.172 billion	$100 billion	$139.212 billion	$91 billion
550	Health	$373.774 billion	$347 billion	$361.625 billion	$347 billion
570	Medicare	$492.316 billion	$482 billion	$484.486 billion	$472 billion
600	Income Security	$554.332 billion	$501 billion	$579.578 billion	$541 billion
650	Social Security	$767.019 billion	$766 billion	$778.574 billion	$773 billion
700	Veterans Benefits and Services	$124.659 billion	$127 billion	$129.605 billion	$124.6 billion
750	Administration of Justice	$58.696 billion	$54 billion	$62.016 billion	$56 billion
800	General Government	$31.149 billion	$27 billion	$31.763 billion	$28 billion
900	Net Interest	$241.598 billion	$256 billion	$224.784 billion	$220 billion
920	Allowances	$6.566 billion	$-3 billion	$0.125 billion	-
950	Undistributed Offsetting Receipts	$-99.635 billion	$-100 billion	$-98.897 billion	($103.5 billion)
	Total	$3728.686 billion	$3529 billion	$3795.547 billion	$3,536.951 billion
