= Deficit commission =

There have been several deficit reduction commissions, including:

- National Commission on Fiscal Responsibility and Reform (United States, 2010)
- National Economic Commission (United States, 1987)
- Peterson Pew Commission on Budget Reform (United States, 2008)
- Rivlin-Domenici deficit reduction commission (United States, 2010)
