= 2013 United States budget sequestration =

Automatic spending cuts in US federal government

As a result of the Budget Control Act of 2011, a set of automatic spending cuts to United States federal government spending in particular of outlays (Note: This procedure was first used in the Gramm–Rudman–Hollings Balanced Budget Act of 1985. The sequesters would take place if the federal deficit exceeded a set of fixed deficit targets.) were initially set to begin on January 1, 2013. They were postponed by two months by the American Taxpayer Relief Act of 2012 until March 1 when this law went into effect.

The reductions in spending authority were approximately $85.4 billion (versus a reduction of $42 billion in actual cash outlays (Note: The Budget Control Act specifies reductions in budget authority for the sequester; that is, the amount of new obligations authorized by law. This is not the same as budget outlays, which are the actual cash disbursements. For example, the $85.4 billion represented the FY2013 decrease in budget authority. But some of that money would have had to be used to enter into contracts to be provided and paid for in subsequent years. The CBO estimated that the reduction in cash disbursements in fiscal year 2013 was about $42 billion.)) during fiscal year 2013, with similar cuts for years 2014 until 2021. However, the Congressional Budget Office estimated that the total federal outlays would continue to increase even with the sequester by an average of $238.6 billion per year during the following decade, although at a somewhat lesser rate.

The cuts were split evenly (by dollar amounts, not by percentages) between the defense and non-defense categories. (Note: The non-defense cuts were further split between discretionary and mandatory spending. Discretionary spending is that part of the federal budget that Congress generally controls through annual appropriation acts or continuing resolutions including the cabinet departments and federal agencies. This is as opposed to mandatory spending: those "self-funded" programs (such as Medicare and federal crop insurance) that have had their expenditures written into their "enabling acts"; that is, the acts that created them. In 2011, discretionary spending totalled about $1.35 trillion, accounting for close to 40 percent of federal expenditures. Slightly more than half of the discretionary money went for defense. The rest of the discretionary spending funded a wide variety of government programs and activities, including education, veterans' benefits, public health and the administration of justice. The area of sequestration most affected was discretionary spending, which represented, in total, approximately 36% of federal outlays in 2012. The sequester also affected certain mandatory programs, including Medicare. The sequester reduced 2013 discretionary spending below 2012 levels, while cuts to Medicare reduced future cost increases.) Some major programs like Social Security, Medicaid, federal pensions and veteran's benefits were exempt. By a special provision in the BCA, Medicare spending rates were limited to no more than 2% per year versus the other, domestic percents planned for the sequester. Federal pay rates (including military) were unaffected but the sequestration did result in involuntary unpaid time off, also known as furloughs.

The sequester lowered spending by a total of approximately $1.1 trillion versus pre-sequester levels over the approximately 8-year period from 2013 to 2021. It lowered non-defense discretionary spending (i.e., certain domestic programs) by a range of 7.8% (in 2013) to 5.5% (in 2021) versus pre-sequester amounts, a total of $294 billion. Defense spending would likewise be lowered by 10% (in 2013) to 8.5% (in 2021), a total of $454 billion. Savings in non-defense mandatory spending would total $170 billion, while interest would be lowered by $169 billion. The CBO estimated that in the absence of sequestration, the GDP would grow about 0.6 percentage points faster for 2013 (from 2.0% to 2.6% or about $90B) and about 750,000 more jobs would be created by year-end. As of May 2013, FY2013 spending ($3.455 trillion) was projected to be lower in an absolute sense than FY2012 spending ($3.537 trillion).

The blunt nature (Note: The Budget Control Act says that these reductions must be made by budget account at the program, project and activity level. This is the smallest division that the annual U.S. Budget normally uses. Thus it makes it very difficult to affect which government programs and activities are being cut. For example, the OMB says that, according to the BCA, the sequester must reduce the Army Reserve Operation and Maintenance account by $309 million in FY2013 while money for the Afghanistan Security Forces must also be cut by $1,325 million. The administration is therefore not allowed by law to decrease the cut for Afghanistan by, say, $50 million while increasing the cut for the Army Reserve by an equal $50 million.) of the cuts has been criticized, with some favoring more tailored cuts and others arguing for postponement while the economy improves.

== Legislative history ==
On August 2, 2011, President Obama signed the Budget Control Act of 2011 as part of an agreement with Congress to resolve the debt-ceiling crisis. The Act provided for a Joint Select Committee on Deficit Reduction (the "super committee") to produce legislation by late November that would decrease the deficit by $1.2 trillion over ten years. When the super committee failed to act, another part of the BCA went into effect. This directed automatic across-the-board cuts (known as "sequestrations") to be split evenly between defense and domestic spending, beginning on January 2, 2013.

The sequestration became a major topic of the fiscal cliff debate. The debate's resolution, the American Taxpayer Relief Act of 2012 (ATRA), eliminated much of the tax side of the dispute but only delayed the budget sequestrations for two months, thus reducing the original $110 billion to be saved per fiscal year to $85 billion in 2013.

== Proposals and counterproposals ==
=== Before the sequester took effect ===
The following significant proposals for stopping or mitigating the automatic cuts were floated before the sequestration was implemented on March 1, 2013:

==== By the President ====
While supporting various Democratic measures but without getting into specifics, President Obama has said that he would still like to see a broad range of spending cuts and tax changes. Failing that, Congress should at least pass a smaller package that would delay the sequester for a few more months. The White House did rule out any attempts to raise the eligibility age for Medicare.

==== By Republicans in Congress ====
The Republican House had narrowly passed a bill on December 20, 2012, which would have replaced only the defense side of the sequester with cuts to programs including food stamps, Dodd-Frank and the Patient Protection and Affordable Care Act. In February with their reduced majority, key Republicans admitted that they would not be able to pass the bill again, even in the House. Nevertheless, many Republicans believed that the bill would serve as a template for what they wanted: no tax increases, no defense cuts, and considerable domestic spending reductions.

==== By Democrats in Congress ====
On February 8, Democrat Chris Van Hollen, ranking member of the House Budget Committee, introduced new taxes and reduced spending to fend off the sequestration, including a Buffett-style tax-rule on millionaires, a repeal of some oil subsidy loopholes, a reduction in farm subsidy payments and an increase in flood insurance premiums.

Patty Murray, Democratic Chairwoman of the Senate Budget Committee, proposed on February 14 to replace the 2013 sequester with $110 billion in spending cuts and tax increases. Like the House version, these policies also include a Buffett-rule tax, the closure of the oil subsidies, and cuts to farm subsidies. Additionally, this bill would cut defense spending for 2013 in excess of the amounts required by the current sequester. But this bill has little chance of winning the 60 votes required to override a filibuster.

Both of these plans are temporary in the sense that they allow much of the sequestration to resume at the end of 2013.

==== By others ====
Some public interest groups concerned about the federal budget wanted to stop the sequester, but few offered detail plans (beyond a "balanced approach") for replacing the automatic cuts. These few included:

- FreedomWorks and the Conservative Action Project said that the sequester should be replaced by defunding Obamacare; that is, eliminating: the refundable tax credits that form the basis of the federal health exchanges, the Medicare expansion matching funds and the increased funding for the Community Health Center Fund (CHCF) and Prevention and Public Health Fund (PPHF).

=== During the sequester ===
While leaving the sequestration in place, the House approved a bipartisan bill on March 6 by a vote of 267 to 151 to extend the continuing resolution from March 27 to September 30 and to keep the federal government from shutting down. The bill also provides Defense and Veterans Affairs some flexibility to fine-tune the sequester cuts.

== CBO projections ==
=== Overview ===
The Congressional Budget Office (CBO) estimated in September 2011 that the sequester would have the following effects between 2013 and 2021:

- "Reductions ranging from 10.0 percent (in 2013) to 8.5 percent (in 2021) in the caps on new discretionary appropriations for defense programs, yielding total outlay savings of $454 billion."
- "Reductions ranging from 7.8 percent (in 2013) to 5.5 percent (in 2021) in the caps on new discretionary appropriations for nondefense programs, resulting in outlay savings of $294 billion."
- "Reductions ranging from 10.0 percent (in 2013) to 8.5 percent (in 2021) in mandatory budgetary resources for nonexempt defense programs, generating savings of about $0.1 billion."
- "Reductions of 2.0 percent each year in most Medicare spending because of the application of a special rule that applies to that program, producing savings of $123 billion, and reductions ranging from 7.8 percent (in 2013) to 5.5 percent (in 2021) in mandatory budgetary resources for other nonexempt nondefense programs and activities, yielding savings of $47 billion. Thus, savings in nondefense mandatory spending would total $170 billion."
- "About $31 billion in outlays stemming from the reductions in premiums for Part B of Medicare and other changes in spending that would result from the sequestration actions."
- "An estimated reduction of $169 billion in debt-service costs."
- "In all, those automatic cuts would produce net budgetary savings of about $1.1 trillion over the 2013–2021 period."

=== Discretionary spending ===
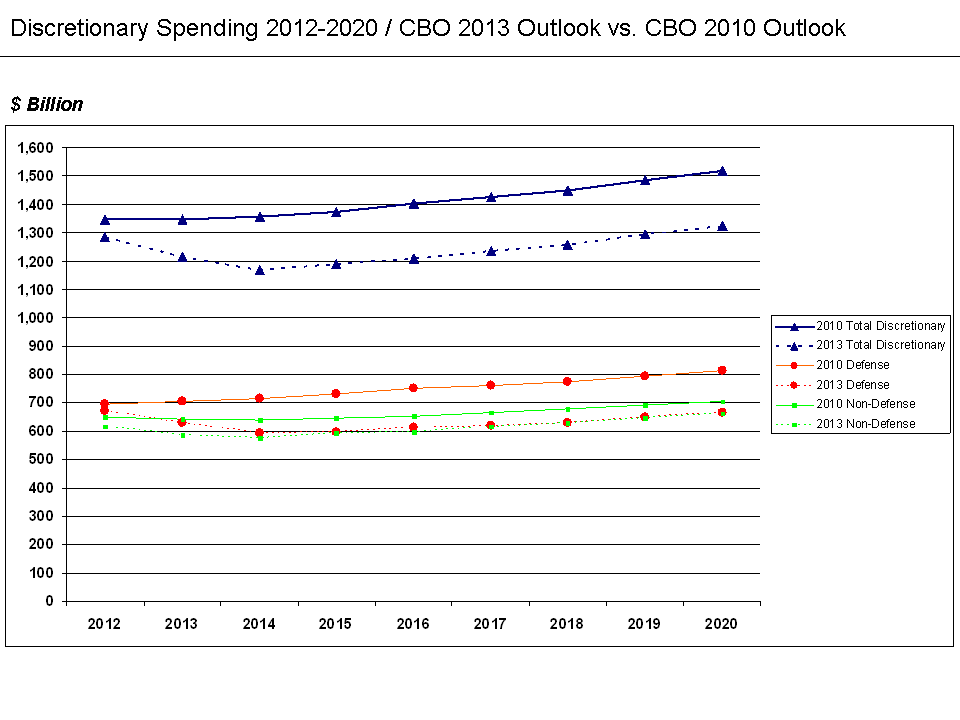
Discretionary spending for the 2012-2020 periods, as projected in the CBO's Budget and Economic Outlook publications from January 2010 and February 2013. The Budget Control Act of 2011 (which includes the sequester) is the primary difference.

Discretionary spending includes both defense and non-defense spending elements, but excludes mandatory programs such as Social Security and Medicare. The Budget Control Act of 2011 included both caps on discretionary spending as well as the sequester, both of which reduce discretionary spending. CBO projected in February 2013 that under the sequester and Budget Control Act caps:

- Discretionary spending outlays will be reduced from $1,285.3 billion in 2012 to $1,213.9 billion in 2013, a reduction of $71.4 billion or 5.6%. Discretionary spending will fall again to $1,170.0 billion in 2014, a decrease of $42.8 billion or 3.6%.
- Discretionary spending will rise gradually from $1,170.0 in 2014 to $1,423.8 billion by 2023, an annual growth rate of 2.2% during the 2014 to 2023 period and 0.9% for the 2012-2023 period. The 2.2% growth rate approximates CBO's projected rate of inflation and is well below the annual spending growth rate of 6.3% from 2000 to 2012.
- Discretionary spending will fall steadily from 8.3% GDP in 2012 to 5.5% GDP by 2023. Discretionary spending averaged 7.7% GDP from 1990 to 2012, ranging from 6.2% GDP to 9.0% GDP.

==== Defense spending ====
CBO projected in February 2013 that under the sequester and Budget Control Act caps:

- Defense spending outlays (including "overseas contingency operations" for Iraq and Afghanistan) will be reduced from $670.3 billion in 2012 to approximately $627.6 billion in 2013, a decrease of $42.7 billion or 6.4%. Defense spending will fall again to $593.4 billion in 2014, a decrease of $34.2 billion or 5.5%.
- Defense spending will rise gradually from $593 billion in 2014 to $714 billion by 2023, an annual growth rate of 2.1% during the 2014 to 2023 period and 0.6% for the 2012-2023 period. The 2.1% growth rate approximates CBO's projected rate of inflation and is well below the annual spending growth rate of 7.1% from 2000–2012.
- Defense spending will fall steadily from 4.3% GDP in 2012 to 2.8% GDP by 2023. Defense spending averaged 4.0% GDP from 1990 to 2012, ranging from 3.0% GDP to 5.2% GDP.

In spite of these reductions, the major defense contractors saw good profits during the sequester.

==== Non-defense discretionary spending ====
Non-defense discretionary spending includes Cabinet Departments and Agencies. CBO projected in February 2013 that under the sequester and Budget Control Act caps:

- Non-defense discretionary spending outlays will be reduced from $615.0 billion in 2012 to approximately $586.3 billion in 2013, a reduction of $28.7 billion or 4.7%. This spending will fall again to $576.6 billion in 2014, a decrease of $9.7 billion or 1.6%.
- Non-defense discretionary spending will rise gradually from $576.6 billion in 2014 to $709.8 billion by 2023, an annual growth rate of 2.3% during the 2014 to 2023 period and 1.3% for the 2012-2023 period. The 2.3% growth rate approximates CBO's projected rate of inflation and is well below the annual spending growth rate of 5.6% from 2000–2012.
- Non-defense discretionary spending will fall steadily from 4.0% GDP in 2012 to 2.7% GDP by 2023. This spending averaged 3.8% GDP from 1990 to 2012, ranging from 3.2% GDP to 4.6% GDP.

=== Mandatory spending ===
Mandatory spending represents outlays to qualified program participants. It does not have to be renewed annually. Major categories of mandatory spending include Medicare, Medicaid and Social Security. The latter two programs are not in the scope of the sequester. An estimated $170 billion over the 2013-2022 period would be saved relative to the pre-sequester path.

==== Medicare ====
CBO estimated in September 2011 that "most" Medicare spending would be reduced by approximately 2% per year versus planned levels, for total savings of $123 billion over the 2013-2022 period. CBO projects that Medicare spending will rise from $551 billion in 2012 to over $1 trillion in 2023, despite the sequester. This is an annual growth rate of 6.3%. Starting April 1, 2013 the sequester cut 2% of the Medicare budget, primarily targeting oncologist reimbursements. Since oncologists cannot change the drug prices, they argue that the entire 2 percent cut will have to come out of the 6 percent overhead they use to cover the cost of storing and administering the medication.

==== Other mandatory spending ====
Other mandatory spending totaling $47 billion would also be reduced during the 2013-2022 period. This includes cuts to aid for Women, Infants, and Children (WIC) and the Low Income Home Energy Assistance Program. Temporary Assistance for Needy Families (welfare) and the Supplemental Nutrition Assistance Program (food stamps) are however exempt from sequestration.

=== Interest savings ===
CBO estimated in September 2011 that interest would be reduced by approximately $170 billion over a decade if the sequester is implemented, due to relatively lower national debt levels compared to the previously planned path.

=== Timing of outlay reduction ===
CBO explained why it expects the sequestration to reduce outlays by $42 billion in fiscal year 2013, although the automatic budget cuts total $85 billion: "The $85 billion represents the reduction in budgetary resources available to government agencies this year as a result of the sequestration. But not all of that money would have been spent in this fiscal year in the absence of the sequestration: Some would have been used to enter into contracts to buy goods or services to be provided and paid for next year or in subsequent years. Acquiring major weapons systems and completing large construction projects, for example, can take several years. The $42 billion figure is CBO’s estimate of the reduction in cash disbursements in fiscal year 2013; much of the remaining outlay reductions from the 2013 sequestration will occur in fiscal year 2014, though some will occur later."

== Sequester in 2014 and beyond ==
The Center on Budget and Policy Priorities reported in April 2012 that the process for 2014 and beyond is different from 2013:

- If Congress passes appropriations legislation that are below the Budget Control Act caps, then "unlike in 2013, there will be no automatic cut of all affected defense programs by the same percentage." The same will be true for the non-defense discretionary cuts.
- "For non-defense programs, the process in years after 2013 is the same as in 2013 for entitlements but different for non-defense discretionary programs."
- "Medicare payments to providers and health insurance plans will continue to be cut by 2 percent; in other words, for the entire nine-year period 2013-2021, providers and plans will be paid 98 cents on the dollar. But because Medicare costs are projected to rise from 2013 through 2021, the dollar amount saved by this 2 percent cut will increase, from $11.0 billion in 2013 to $11.4 billion in 2014 and ultimately to $17.8 billion in 2021."
- "Because Medicare will take a growing share of the $54.7 billion annual non-defense cut (it will account for 21 percent of that amount in 2014 but 33 percent in 2021), other non-defense programs will absorb a declining share of the cut."

The sequestration levels will not be enforced until January of each fiscal year, because historically Congress would pass appropriations bills later than the beginning of the fiscal year, and the final appropriated amounts would not be known until after Congress had adjourned at the end of the calendar year.

Mitch McConnell has said that he will attempt to lock in the sequestration in any future budget deal. CNO Jonathan Greenert testified that this would result in immediate cutbacks in naval construction and final combat fleet of 255 ships, and others testified that sequestration risks injuring several programs such as fighter engines, rotorcraft, missiles and railguns.

In December 2013, the Bipartisan Budget Act of 2013 changed the sequestration caps for FY2014 and FY2015. This deal would eliminate some of the spending cuts required by the sequester by $45 billion of the cuts scheduled to happen in January and $18 billion of the cuts scheduled to happen in 2015. Federal spending would thus be larger in these two years, but would be less in subsequent years until 2023, due to other provisions such as imposing sequester cuts in 2022 and 2023, raising airline fees and changing the pension contribution requirements of new federal workers. Paul Ryan said that the bill would lower the deficit by $23 billion overall. The increased spending for 2014 and 2015 was spread evenly between defense spending and non-defense discretionary spending, leaving the cuts to mandatory spending unchanged. The bill did not make any changes to entitlement programs.

== Economic effects ==
Alan Krueger, chairman of the White House Council of Economic Advisers, predicted that the sequestration would contribute significant economic headwinds that would slow the recovery of the U.S. labor market. In February 2012 the CBO reported, "In the absence of sequestration, CBO estimates, GDP growth would be about 0.6 percentage points faster during [the 2013] calendar year, and the equivalent of about 750,000 more full-time jobs would be created or retained by the fourth quarter."

Economist Paul Krugman cited one estimate that implementation of the sequester could cost 700,000 jobs. The International Monetary Fund plans to lower its 2013 GDP growth forecast for the U.S. from 2.0% to 1.5% if the sequester is implemented.

Federal Reserve Chair Ben Bernanke testified in February 2013 that the Federal government should replace the sequester with smaller cuts today and larger cuts in the future, due to concerns the sequester would slow the economy. He reminded lawmakers of the CBO's guidance that recent austerity measures were projected to reduce economic growth by up to 1.5 percentage points in 2013 (relative to what it would have been otherwise), of which 0.6 percentage points related to the sequester. Bernanke stated that the long-run fiscal issues mainly related to an aging population and healthcare costs. He wrote: "To address both the near- and longer-term [fiscal] issues, the Congress and the Administration should consider replacing the sharp, front-loaded spending cuts required by the sequestration with policies that reduce the federal deficit more gradually in the near term but more substantially in the longer run. Such an approach could lessen the near-term fiscal headwinds facing the recovery while more effectively addressing the longer-term imbalances in the federal budget."

Bernanke also explained that although current laws would stabilize the debt-to-GDP ratio at around 75%, the ratio averaged less than 40% from 1960 to the onset of the crisis in 2008: "This relatively low level of debt provided the nation much-needed flexibility to meet the economic challenges of the past few years. Replenishing this fiscal capacity will give future Congresses and Administrations greater scope to deal with unforeseen events."

A few months later, the Federal Open Market Committee reviewed the latest economic data and concluded that the sequestration was "restraining economic growth" and slowing the recovery in the jobs market.

A May 2014 report from the Government Accountability Office quantified the effects of the sequestration on federal employees and concluded that the Justice Department laid off one staff member as a result.

== Impact on research funding ==
Under sequestration, agencies that fund research and development would see their budgets cut 5.1 to 7.3 percent in 2013 and remain stagnant through 2021. In the three years following sequestration, this reduction in R&D was projected to decrease the number of jobs by 600,000. The Information Technology & Innovation Foundation estimated sequestration would reduce GDP by $200 billion compared to a scenario where R&D funding were fixed at 2011 amounts and by $565 billion compared to a scenario where R&D funding grows in proportion to output.

The director of the National Institutes of Health (NIH) at the time, Francis S. Collins, said: "I worry desperately this means we will lose a generation of young scientists." Grant applications were already funded at half their historic rate, and with the sequester the chances of approval were expected to decrease even further. Former NIH head Dr. Elias Zerhouni argued that the sequester would have a substantial impact on the future of scientific research. Since the NIH would have to continue to fund existing research, the sequester would fall heavily on new research proposals.

== Other effects ==
In September 2013, the Federal Bureau of Investigation released a report entitled "Voices from the Field" citing the impacts of sequestration to include "New intelligence investigations were not being opened. Criminal cases were being closed. Informants couldn’t be paid. And there was not enough funding for agents to put gas in their cars."

For the 2013–2014 academic year, the Early Head Start and Head Start Programs eliminated services for 57,000 children to balance budgets diminished by the federal sequester.

== Timeline ==
- August 1, 2011: House of Representatives passes the Budget Control Act of 2011, which is passed by the Senate and signed by U.S. President Obama the following day. This act provided that, if the Joint Select Committee did not produce bipartisan legislation, across-the-board spending cuts would take effect on January 2, 2013.
- January 1, 2013: The Senate passes the American Taxpayer Relief Act of 2012, delaying the sequestration until March 1, 2013. The act is passed by the House of Representatives and signed by President Obama late the following day.
- January 23, 2013: House of Representatives passes the No Budget, No Pay Act of 2013, temporarily suspending the debt ceiling until May 18, 2013. The act is passed by the Senate the following day and signed into law by president Obama on February 4.
- March 1, 2013: With no deal reached, all parties concerned seemed resigned that sequestration cuts would take effect at midnight. Later in the day, President Obama signed an order putting the cuts into effect. He referred to them as being "deeply destructive".
- March 6, 2013: The House of Representative passed a bill to extend the continuing resolution and to enable defense and veterans programs to adjust to the cuts brought on by sequestration.
