= Social Security Protection Act of 2011 =

- Long title: A bill to amend title IV of the Budget Control Act of 2011 to protect the Social Security and SSI programs from budget cuts under such Act.
- Enacted by: the 112th United States Congress

Codification
- Acts amended: Budget Control Act of 2011

Legislative history
- Introduced in the House as H.R. 2723 by Frederica Wilson (D–FL) on August 1, 2011; Committee consideration by Rules

Social Security Protection Act of 2011 is a proposed change to the United States Constitution. The amendment is in response to the proposed changes to Social Security qualifications that are aiming to combat the rising debt ceiling. Advocates of the bill argue that Social Security has consistently succeeded in protecting millions of Americans from poverty, providing beneficiaries with substantial benefits while never contributing to federal debt or financial crisis. The Amendment was first introduced during the 112th Congress in August 2011, but no action was taken during that Congress.
