= Thomas G. Thibodeau =

American academic and real estate scholar

Thomas G. Thibodeau is an American real estate scholar. He is professor of global real estate capital markets at the University of Colorado-Boulder.

== Education and career ==
Thibodeau graduated from the University of Hartford in 1975 with a dual degree in mathematics and management science. He received an M.S. degree in statistics in 1979 and a Ph.D. in economics in 1980 from the State University of New York at Stony Brook. In 1982 he was a staff consultant for President Ronald Reagan's Commission on Housing.

He worked as a research associate in the Housing Division of The Urban Institute in Washington, D.C. He then joined the real estate faculty at the Cox School of Business, Southern Methodist University and was a visiting professor of real estate at the Wharton School of Business of the University of Pennsylvania, and a visiting scholar at the Philadelphia Federal Reserve Bank. He is now the Global Real Estate Capital Markets Professor at the University of Colorado-Boulder.

Thibodeau’s research has focused on housing economics, particularly the analysis of market forces affecting house prices, house price risk, and development of house price indices.

Thibodeau was the managing editor of Real Estate Economics in 2000 and 2005. He is a past President of the American Real Estate and Urban Economics Association (AREUEA) and is a Fellow of the Homer Hoyt Advanced Studies Institute. He serves as the Academic Director of the University of Colorado Real Estate Center (CUREC).

== Awards ==
- 2008 - American Real Estate and Urban Economics Association (AREUEA) George Bloom Award for “outstanding contributions to the field of real estate.”
- 2009 - National Association of Industrial Office Properties (NAIOP) Research Foundation Governors NAIOP Distinguished Fellow.
