= The Path to Prosperity =

U.S. budget proposal of the Republican Party

The Path to Prosperity: Restoring America's Promise was the Republican Party's budget proposal for the federal government of the United States in the fiscal year 2012. It was succeeded in March 2012 by The Path to Prosperity: A Blueprint for American Renewal, the Republican budget proposal for 2013. Representative Paul Ryan, chairman of the House Budget Committee, played a prominent public role in drafting and promoting both Path to Prosperity proposals, and they are therefore often referred to as the Ryan budget, Ryan plan or Ryan proposal.

The plans stand in contrast to the 2012 and 2013 budget proposals, outlined by president Barack Obama and the Congressional Progressive Caucus.

The 2012 Republican proposal was formalized and passed by the House of Representatives on Friday, April 15, 2011 by a vote of 235 to 193, largely along party lines. No Democrats voted in favor of the bill, and four Republicans—Walter B. Jones Jr., David McKinley, Ron Paul and Denny Rehberg—voted against it. A month later, the Senate voted against the budget by a vote of 57–40.

The 2013 proposal would have provided workers under the age of 55 (beginning in 2023) a choice of private plans competing alongside the traditional fee-for-service option on a newly created Medicare Exchange. Medicare would provide a premium payment to either pay for or offset the premium of the plan chosen by the senior. This plan was similar to a plan developed with senator Ron Wyden of Oregon, a Democrat, but was different enough so that Wyden opposed it. To secure Medicaid benefits, The Path to Prosperity would have converted the federal share of Medicaid spending into a block grant indexed for inflation and population growth. The 2013 proposal also would have capped non-defense discretionary federal spending at $1.029 trillion and consolidated the six existing income tax brackets into two.

In April 2011, Ryan published three videos on The Path to Prosperity.

In March 2013, Ryan introduced H.Con.Res 25 to the House of Representatives, a new version of the budget updated for fiscal year 2014. The House voted 221–207 to pass H.Con.Res 25 on March 21, 2013. By July, the Ryan budget lost support when even House Republicans failed to support the THUD cuts.

In 2016, Ryan and Representative Kevin Brady, chairman of the House Ways and Means Committee, proposed a similar tax plan entitled A Better Way.

== History ==
On May 21, 2008, Ryan originally introduced H.R. 6110, the Roadmap for America's Future Act of 2008. This proposed legislation outlined changes to entitlement spending, including a controversial proposal to replace Medicare with a voucher program for seniors. The Roadmap found only eight sponsors and did not move past committee.

On January 27, 2010, Ryan released a modified version of his Roadmap, H.R. 4529: Roadmap for America's Future Act of 2010. The modified plan would provide across-the-board tax cuts by reducing income tax rates; eliminate income taxes on capital gains, dividends, and interest; and abolish the corporate income tax, estate tax, and Alternative Minimum Tax. The plan would privatize a portion of Social Security, eliminate the tax exclusion for employer-sponsored health insurance, and privatize Medicare. Chief actuary of Medicare Rick Foster compared Ryan's "Roadmap" with the 2010 healthcare reform in congressional hearings, stating that while both had "some potential" to make healthcare prices "more sustainable", he was more "confident" in Ryan's plan.

== Key features ==
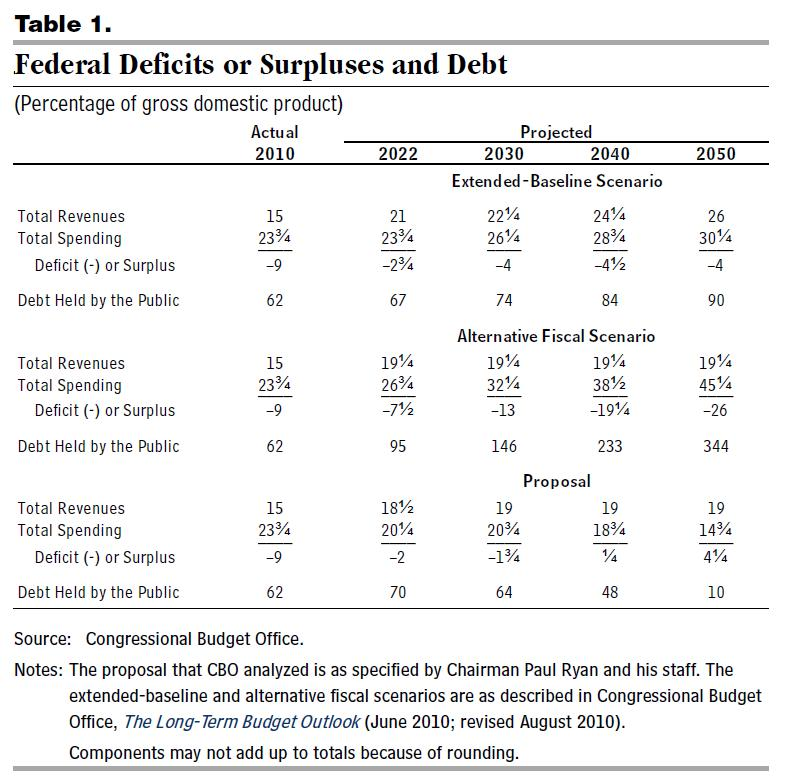
U.S. federal deficits, surpluses, and debt under various plans.

The Republican 2012 Budget proposal, as specified to Congressional Budget Office (CBO) by Paul Ryan's staff, encompasses changes to Medicare, Medicaid, the major 2010 health care legislation, other government spending (excluding that for Social Security), and tax law.

=== Medicare and Medicaid changes ===
- Medicare: Starting in 2022, the proposal would end the current Medicare program for all Americans born after 1957 and replace it with a new program (still called Medicare) which uses a voucher and would increase the age of eligibility for Medicare:
  - Starting in 2022, the age of eligibility for Medicare would increase by two months per year until it reached 67 in 2033.
  - After 2022, the current Medicare program ends for all people who have not already enrolled. People already enrolled in the current Medicare program prior to 2022 would continue to receive the program. New enrollees after 2022 would be entitled to a voucher to help them purchase private health insurance.
  - Beneficiaries of the voucher payments would choose among competing private insurance plans operating in a newly established Medicare exchange. Plans would have to insure all eligible people who apply and would have to charge the same premiums for enrollees of the same age. The voucher payments would go directly from the government to the private insurance companies that people selected.
  - The voucher payments would vary with the health status of the beneficiary. For the average 65-year-old, payment in 2022 is specified to be $8,000, which is approximately the same dollar amount as projected net federal spending per capita for 65-year-olds in traditional Medicare in that year.
  - Each year, the voucher payments would increase to reflect increases in the consumer price index (average inflation) and the fact that enrollees in Medicare tend to be less healthy and require more costly health care as they age. They would not increase by the higher, healthcare inflation rate.
  - The voucher payments to enrollees would also vary with the income of the beneficiary. The wealthiest 2% of enrollees would receive 30 percent of the premium support amount described above; the next 6% would receive 50 percent of the amount described above; and people in the remaining 92% the income distribution would receive the full premium support amount described above.
  - Eligibility for the traditional Medicare program would not change for people who are age 55 or older by the end of 2011 or for people who receive Medicare benefits through the Disability Insurance program prior to 2022. People covered under traditional Medicare would, beginning in 2022, have the option of switching to the voucher system.
- The proposal would modify Medicaid as follows:
  - Starting in 2013, the federal share of all Medicaid payments would be converted into block grants to be allocated to the states. The total dollar amount of the block grants would increase annually with population growth and with growth in the consumer price index (average inflation).
  - Starting in 2022, Medicaid block grant payments would be reduced to exclude projected spending for acute care services for elderly Medicaid beneficiaries.
  - States would have additional flexibility in designing their programs.

=== Repeal of 2010 health care legislation ===
- 2010 Health Care Legislation: The Republican proposal would make several changes to the 2010 Patient Protection and Affordable Care Act and the health care provisions of the Health Care and Education Reconciliation Act of 2010.
  - In general, key provisions of those laws that deal with insurance coverage would be repealed, including:
    - Repeal the requirement that most legal U.S. residents obtain health insurance;
    - Repeal the establishment of health insurance exchanges and subsidies for some individuals and families who purchase coverage through the exchanges;
    - Repeal the expansion of Medicaid coverage to include most nonelderly income below 138 percent of the federal poverty level;
    - Repeal penalties on certain employers if any of their workers obtain subsidized coverage through the exchanges; and
    - Repeal tax credits for small employers that offer health insurance.
  - The proposal would repeal the Community Living Assistance Services and Supports Act (CLASS Act) program for long-term care insurance, as well as a number of mandatory grant programs including funds for so-called high-risk pools, reinsurance for early retirees, and prevention and public health activities.
  - The proposal would repeal the provisions that created the Independent Payment Advisory Board, which has the explicit task of reducing the rate of growth in Medicare without affecting coverage or quality.
  - Canceling the expanded subsidies aimed at closing the "coverage gap" in Medicare Part D, the so-called "Medicare doughnut hole." The gap is a range of spending in which many Medicare beneficiaries are financially responsible for the entire cost of prescription drugs until the expense reaches the catastrophic coverage threshold.

=== Other healthcare reforms ===
- Tort reform: Several changes would be made to laws governing medical malpractice, including putting in place limits on noneconomic and punitive damages.

=== Other spending cuts ===
The Path to Prosperity reduces other mandatory and discretionary spending from 12 percent of GDP in 2010 to about 6 percent in 2021. One example is Ryan recommended that the federal government not fund the Institute of Museum and Library Services and "shift the federal agency's responsibilities to the private sector in his 2015 fiscal year budget resolution" such as "funded at the state and local level and augmented significantly by charitable contributions from the private sector".

=== Revenues and taxation ===
The instructions given to the CBO to evaluate the proposal specified revenue of 19% GDP, which is above the current level of around 15% GDP and slightly above the 30-year historical average of 18.2% GDP. The Path states separately that income tax rates would be lowered and selected tax expenditures (such as deductions, exemptions, and subsidies) would be eliminated. A Reuters article has also stated that the plan would eliminate taxes on overseas profits for businesses.

=== Social Security ===
Social Security receives no changes in the proposal compared to the baseline. The CBO states that "spending on that program is projected to be relatively stable as a share of GDP from 2030 forward."

== Public opinion ==
According to Politico, most polls are unfavorable towards the plan. According to liberal columnist Ezra Klein when CBO estimates of benefit cuts are factored in, 80 percent or more of Americans oppose the plan.

In June 2011, a CNN/ORC poll found that 58 percent of Americans opposed the idea while 35 supported. Among seniors, 74 percent opposed the plan. In the same month a Pew Research poll surveyed support for changing Medicare and found that 41 percent of Americans opposed it while 36 percent supported it. The Pew poll found that the more Democrats and Independents were made aware of the plan were more likely to oppose it; Republicans were more supportive the more they heard about it. An NBC/Wall Street Journal poll found that 31 percent of Americans thought it was a bad idea while 22 percent thought it was a good idea.

In April 2011, a New York Times/CBS poll found that 61 percent of Americans thought Medicare was "worth the cost" making it politically risky to implement the plan. The poll also found that 47 percent approved of turning Medicare into a private insurance program while 41 percent disapproved. A Gallup poll in the same month found an even split for deficit reduction plans with 44 percent of Americans supporting the Democratic plan while 43 supported the Ryan plan, although the same poll found that senior citizens preferred the Ryan plan over the Obama plan. As well, in a Washington Post/ABC poll found that 65 percent of Americans opposed the plan while 34 percent supported it.

In April 2011, a Kaiser Family Foundation poll found that 50 percent of Americans wanted to keep Medicare the way it is while 46 percent favored turning it into a voucher system per the Ryan plan. Among seniors, 62 percent wanted to maintain Medicare while 30 percent favored turning it into a voucher program.

== Reactions and debate ==
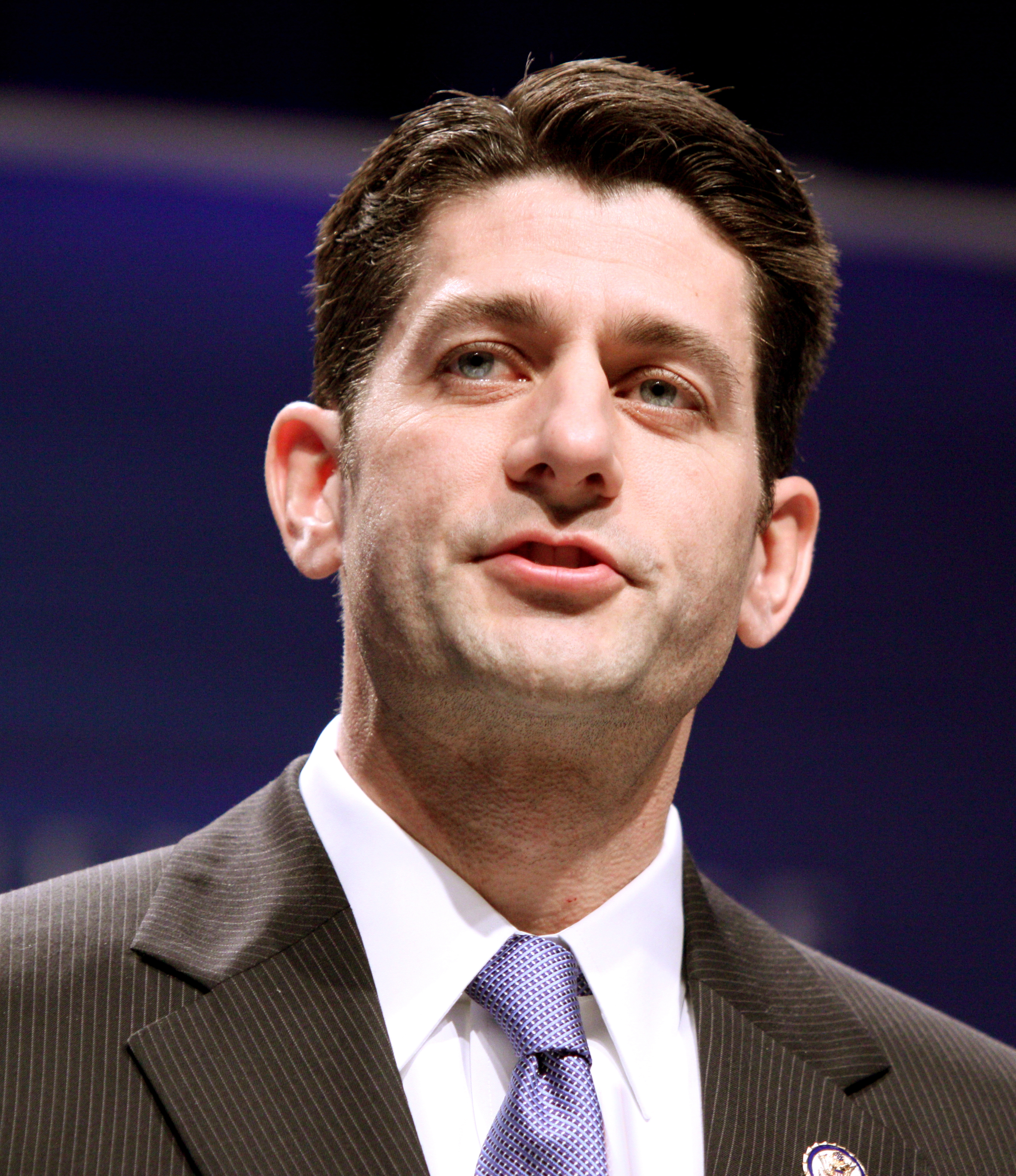
Paul Ryan pictured in February 2011.

The proposal broadly generated negative reactions from Democrats and positive reactions from Republicans.

A news analysis piece by Glenn Kessler in the Washington Post stated that the proposal "relies on dubious assertions, questionable assumptions and fishy figures". He stated that it involved unrealistic assumptions for the status quo (the alternate fiscal scenario) such as the inclusion of all the Bush-era tax cuts being extended forever and the alternative minimum tax being indexed for inflation.

Economist and columnist Paul Krugman called it "ridiculous and heartless" due to a combination of income tax rate reductions (which he argued mainly benefit the wealthy) and large spending cuts that would affect the poor and middle classes. The New York Times editorial board wrote: "We are also certain that repealing [Obama's healthcare] reform—the Republicans' No. 1 goal—would do enormous damage to all Americans and make it even harder to wrestle down health care costs, the best way to deal with the country's long-term fiscal crisis."

The Heritage Foundation, a conservative think tank, felt "The Ryan budget features strong, substantive, market-based reforms to the health entitlements and a solid, growth-oriented tax plan. It cuts spending, in the budget year of 2013 and into the future, from both discretionary accounts and entitlements. Ryan has put forth a serious plan worthy of serious consideration. His budget lays out substantive policy choices, cutting spending, reforming entitlements, and avoiding tax hikes. It also outlines a tax reform that would strengthen the economy and by implication further strengthen government finances through organic revenue growth. It represents real progress toward tackling the nation's fiscal and economic challenges." It later published The 10 Myths of Ryan's House Budget Plan^{[unfit]}

Ryan appeared on the April 3 episode of Fox News Sunday with Chris Wallace to discuss the proposal.

Minority Whip Steny Hoyer, a Democrat from Maryland, remarked on CNBC's Squawk Box that the House had ignored the recommendations made by the federal deficit commission. Hoyer said, "This is exactly the same rhetoric, exactly the same kind of plan that was offered in 2001 and 2003, and it led to the deepest recession this country has seen; extraordinary loss of jobs and a tanking of the stock market. Very frankly, that's not a path we want to go down again."

Speaker of the House John Boehner and House Majority Leader Eric Cantor praised Ryan's proposal. They argued that a national conversation must take place between people of all political stripes about the fiscal future. Boehner remarked, "The president is certainly entitled to disagree with our budget... but what exactly is his alternative?" Cantor said on the April 10 episode of Fox News Sunday with Chris Wallace:

What we've said and what the Ryan budget calls for are spending targets. And the way we get to spending targets both on the discretionary and mandatory side of the ledger. As we know, the unfunded obligations on entitlement programs are really what are so daunting and causing global investors, as well as Americans, to doubt whether this country can deal with its fiscal challenges. So, what we've said is this: we're going to protect today's seniors and those nearing retirement. But for the rest of us, all of us who are 54 and younger, I know those programs are not going to be there for me when I retire, just like everyone else 54 and younger. They can't. We cannot sustain that kind of trajectory.

On April 5, 2011 House Minority Leader Nancy Pelosi tweeted that "The Path to Prosperity" was "a path to poverty for America's seniors and children." On April 13, 2011, Obama said "I don't think there's anything courageous about asking for sacrifice from those who can least afford it." On an April 27, 2011 conference call with reporters Senate Majority Leader Harry Reid said that passage of the Ryan plan "would be one of the worst things to happen to this country."

=== Changes to Medicare ===
Michael Hiltzik in the LA Times says there's no reason to believe that Ryan's proposals will do anything to reduce healthcare costs in the U.S., and reason to believe they would do the opposite.

Henry Aaron, one of two economists who coined the term "premium support" in response to criticisms of health care vouchers, states that the Republican plan for Medicare uses vouchers, not "premium support". The defining attribute of the plans that Aaron christened "premium support" was that governmental financial support would rise with average health care costs. The Republican plan instead has this support rising with the consumer price index (general inflation). This difference is crucial to understanding the Republican proposal, as the cost of health care is rising much faster than the consumer price index.

The vouchers would rise in value with the consumer price index (general inflation), but as medical expenses have been rising much faster than the consumer price index, the value of the government subsidy would erode over time. When the program begins in 2022, the typical 65-year-old would be responsible for about 25% of the cost of their healthcare, which is consistent with Medicare as it exists today. However, the share paid out-of-pocket by this typical 65-year-old in 2030 would be 68% under the Republican plan, according to the bipartisan Congressional Budget Office.

Ryan claimed that his new Medicare plan was modeled after the health care plans that Congressmen themselves currently receive. Others point out that Members of Congress have what is called a "fair-share deal" as they do not bear the entire risk of increased costs because of health care inflation. The health care plan that Members of Congress use indexes benefits to health care inflation, not the consumer price index. As health care becomes more expensive due to inflation, the government, not Members of Congress, are responsible for most of the extra costs.

Chairman of the Senate Budget Committee Kent Conrad, a Democrat from North Dakota, told NPR's Morning Edition that the reductions in Medicare spending would be "draconian". He also faulted the effort for not including cuts to defense spending and tax increases, which Hoyer argued must be part of any serious budgetary reform.

Former Speaker of the House Newt Gingrich called the plan "right wing social engineering," "radical change," and "too big of a jump."

Several presumptive Republican Presidential candidates made statements in support of the proposal. Former Minnesota Governor Tim Pawlenty and former Massachusetts Governor Mitt Romney applauded the effort for "offering real leadership" and "setting the right tone".

The Center for Economic and Policy Research Center for Economic and Policy Research has released a study, based largely on CBO calculations, suggesting that the Ryan Plan will add trillions of dollars to the cost of Medicare because of the lower efficiency of private insurance as compared to the current government program.

Chief actuary of Medicare Rick Foster compared Ryan's "Roadmap" with the 2010 healthcare reform in congressional hearings, stating that while both had "some potential" to make healthcare prices "more sustainable", he was more "confident" in Ryan's plan.

=== Changes to tax law ===
James Fallows, a Democrat, former speechwriter for Jimmy Carter, and national correspondent for The Atlantic, panned the proposal. He wrote:

A plan that proposes to eliminate tax loopholes and deductions, but doesn't say what any of those are, is neither brave nor serious. It is, instead canny—or cynical, take your pick. The reality is that many of these deductions, notably for home-mortgage interest payments, are popular and therefore risky to talk about eliminating. [Bold in original]

Additionally, Erik Wasson wrote:

On taxes, the Ryan plan also eliminates the Alternative Minimum Tax, cuts the 35 percent corporate rate to 25 percent and eliminates taxes on foreign profits.

=== CBO review ===
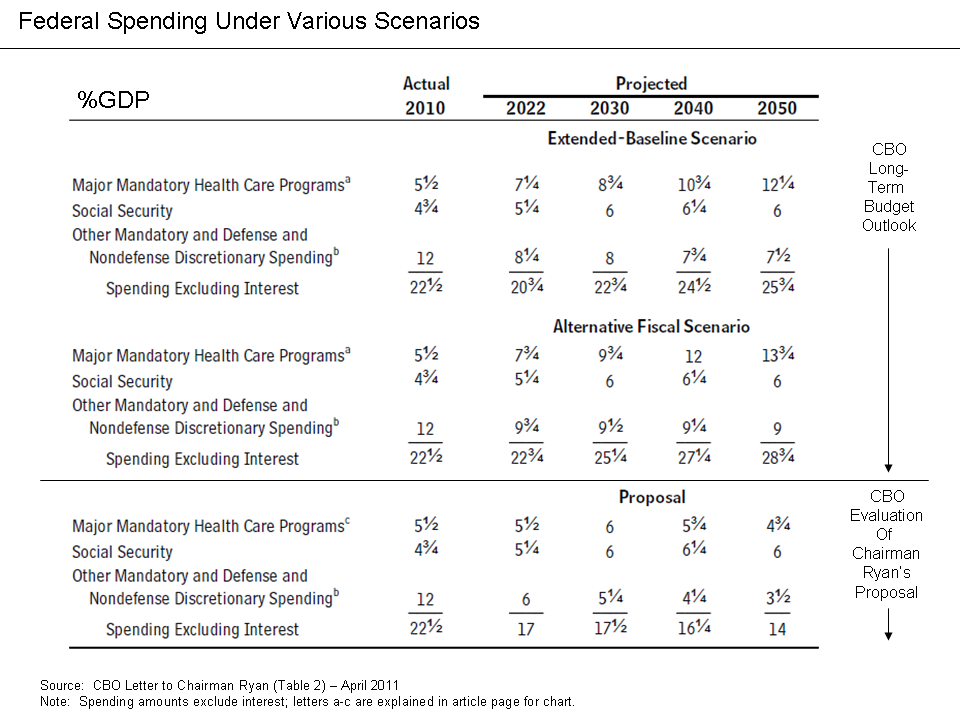
CBO – Federal Spending as %GDP Under Alternative Scenarios and Ryan's Path

The Congressional Budget Office (CBO) did an analysis of the resolution (a less rigorous evaluation than full scoring of legislation), estimating that the Path would balance the budget by 2030 and reduce the level of debt held by the public to 10% GDP by 2050, vs. 62% in 2010. The Path assumes revenue collection of 19% GDP after 2022, up from the current 15% GDP and closer to the historical average of 18.3% GDP. A grouping of spending categories called "Other Mandatory and Defense and Non-Defense Discretionary spending" would be reduced from 12% GDP in 2010 to 3.5% by 2050.

The CBO also analyzed the Medicare aspects of the resolution, reporting that: "Under the proposal, most beneficiaries who receive premium support payments would pay more for their healthcare than if they participated in traditional Medicare under either of CBO's long-term scenarios. CBO estimated that, in 2030, a typical 65-year old would pay 68 percent of the benchmark under the proposal, compared with 25 percent under the extended-baseline scenario and 30 percent under the alternative fiscal scenario." The benchmark refers to the estimated cost of a private health insurance plan with a benefit package comparable to Medicare. The additional cost was because both administrative costs (including profits) and payment rates to providers are higher under private plans. The additional cost would be partially offset by: a) incremental "utilization management" or care restrictions exerted by private providers versus Medicare; and b) enrollees facing increased cost-sharing would tend to lower utilization of services.

=== Effects on States and Localities ===
On August 8, 2012 the Center on Budget and Policy Priorities (CBPP), a left-leaning think tank, released a comprehensive study detailing how Paul Ryan's budget plan would affect state and local government. The study concluded that the plan would force states and localities to cut services drastically, due to the substantial cuts in federal funding they would receive. The largest cut in funding from the federal government would be Medicaid funding. The plan cuts federal funding for the federal-state Medicaid program by 34% by 2022, and by steadily larger amounts in years after that. For services such as education, law enforcement, water treatment, and disaster response, states would lose over $247 billion in federal funding from 2013–2021. The plan also would cut federal funding for state and local transportation and infrastructure projects by $194 billion through 2021. By 2021, the plan would reduce discretionary state and local grants to an estimate 0.6% of GDP, which is less than half the average of the last 35 years. The study also concluded that the plan would hurt economic recovery and job growth by forcing layoffs at the state and local levels of government. The plan may also result in higher taxes at the state and local levels, to help offset the cuts in federal aid.

=== Projections and Assumptions ===
The Path has been criticized by some commentators and analysts for its allegedly unrealistic projections and assumptions about future levels of discretionary spending, tax revenue, health care costs, and unemployment. The Path projects to achieve a spending level of 3.5% GDP for all federal government spending aside from health care and social security by 2050. In 2011, this spending level was 12.5% GDP. The Path also projects federal tax revenue to be 19% GDP, up from the 2011 level of 15.5% GDP. This had been called unrealistic because the Path calls for $4.6 trillion in tax cuts with no offsetting tax increases, other than the closing of unspecified tax loopholes. The Path assumes that unemployment will steadily drop to 2.8% by 2021. This would be the lowest annualized unemployment rate since the Bureau of Labor Statistics (BLS), began tracking unemployment in 1948. The Path assumes that the cost of Medicaid and the Children's Health Insurance Program (CHIP) will not exceed inflation.

Conservative commentator Louis Woodhill has called Ryan's proposal "The Path to Austerity" because of its exclusive focus on spending rather than economic growth.

== The Path to Prosperity: A Blueprint for American Renewal ==
In March 2012, the House Budget Committee introduced a new version of The Path to Prosperity as their proposed budget for the fiscal year 2013. The proposal was authored by Paul Ryan and is intended to contrast with President Obama's stance on taxes and federal spending. The proposal aims to reduce the ten-year federal deficit to $3.13 trillion through measures including a cap on discretionary federal spending at $1.029 trillion and dismantling the Obama administration's 2010 healthcare reform law. Similarly to the 2012 budget plan, it focuses on cuts in federal spending—except on national defense—aiming to reduce spending by $5 trillion and balance the budget by 2040.

The proposal was endorsed by presidential candidate Mitt Romney and supported by the Republican party; however, according to Reuters, some Republicans in the House have stated that the proposal does not go far enough with its spending cuts. It was also criticized by House Democrats who claimed that the plan would negatively impact the middle class, seniors and lower-income Americans.

The proposal was criticized by President Obama in a speech at an Associated Press luncheon on April 3, 2012, where he claimed the plan amounted to "thinly veiled social Darwinism". The plan was also criticized by Newt Gingrich who called it "right-wing social engineering". In response, both Ryan and Romney stated that Obama had distorted the facts of the proposal, in particular its aim to reduce federal debt, and had used his criticism to distract from his own economic performance.

The Heritage Foundation praised the budget proposal for its cuts to federal spending and for making defense a priority, although it commented that the plan was not bold or aggressive enough with entitlement reforms and spending reductions. The proposal received criticism from progressive organizations, including the Center for American Progress, which argued that the plan would have a negative impact on all but the top 1% and "especially hurts communities of color."

== See also ==
- A Better Way
- National Commission on Fiscal Responsibility and Reform
- U.S. House Fiscal Year 2014 Budget (H. Con. Res. 25; 113th Congress) – The Fiscal Year 2014 version of the Ryan Budget
