= National Commission on Fiscal Responsibility and Reform =

2010 American presidential commission

The National Commission on Fiscal Responsibility and Reform (often called Simpson–Bowles or Bowles–Simpson from the names of co-chairs Alan Simpson and Erskine Bowles; or NCFRR) was a bipartisan Presidential Commission on deficit reduction, created in 2010 by President Barack Obama to identify "policies to improve the fiscal situation in the medium term and to achieve fiscal sustainability over the long run". The 18-member Commission, consisting of 12 members of Congress and six private citizens, first met on April 27, 2010. A report was released on December 1, recommending a combination of spending cuts (including an increase in the Social Security retirement age and cuts to military, benefit, and domestic spending) and tax increases (including restricting or eliminating certain tax credits and deductions and increasing the federal gasoline tax).

The commission's recommendations were politically controversial. Under the executive order that created the commission, a supermajority of 14 of the 18 commissioners had to agree to a recommendation before it was sent to Congress for a vote. In a vote in December 2010, the commission fell short of that requirement, with only 11 out of the 18 commissioners (five Republicans, five Democrats, and one independent) voting to endorse the commission's blueprint.

Proponents of the plan praised it for hitting all parts of the federal budget and for putting the national debt on a stable and then downward path. Prominent supporters include JPMorgan Chase CEO Jamie Dimon, House Speaker Nancy Pelosi (although at first she opposed the proposal), then-Secretary of State Hillary Clinton, and Republican Senator Tom Coburn; Democratic Representative Chris Van Hollen has called for a deal based on the Simpson–Bowles framework.

Critics on the left, such as Democratic Representative Jan Schakowsky (a Commission member) and economist Paul Krugman, opposed the Simpson–Bowles proposal because it would cut entitlement and social safety net programs, including Social Security and Medicare. Critics on the right, such as Republican commission members Paul Ryan, Jeb Hensarling, and Dave Camp, and anti-tax activist Grover Norquist of Americans for Tax Reform, objected to the Simpson-Bowles proposal because it would raise taxes.

== History ==
The original proposal for a commission came from bipartisan legislation that would have required Congress to vote on its recommendations as presented, without any amendment. In January 2010, that bill failed in the Senate by a vote of 53–46, when six Republicans who had co-sponsored it nevertheless voted against it. Thereafter, President Obama established the commission by Executive Order 13531. Former Republican Senator Alan Simpson (Wyo.), after his appointment to co-chair the commission, criticized the former supporters who had voted against the bill, saying that their purpose "was to stick it to the president." In the absence of special legislation, the commission's proposals are not guaranteed to be considered by Congress in a single up-or-down vote, although then-Speaker of the House of Representatives Nancy Pelosi and Senate Majority Leader Harry Reid pledged to bring its recommendations for an up or down vote.

== Commission members ==
The Commission included 18 members and one executive director appointed by the president. This included six members of the U.S. House of Representatives, and six members of the U.S. Senate.

The first vote on the final recommendations, originally set for December 1, 2010, was delayed until December 3 when the commission fell short of the supermajority of 14 of 18 votes needed to approve the report. The eleven voting for it were five Democrats (Bowles, Conrad, Durbin, Rivlin, Spratt) and five Republicans (Coburn, Cote, Crapo, Gregg, Simpson) and one Independent (Fudge); the seven voting against it were four Democrats (Baucus, Becerra, Schakowsky, Stern) and three Republicans (Camp, Hensarling, Ryan).

| | Republican / Independent | Democratic |
|---|---|---|
| President's Appointments | Alan Simpson (co-chair; fmr. U.S. Senator); Dave M. Cote (Honeywell International); Ann M. Fudge [Independent] (fmr. CEO Young & Rubicam Brands) | Erskine Bowles (co-chair; fmr. White House Chief of Staff); Andy Stern (fmr. president of Service Employees International Union); Alice Rivlin (Brookings Institution, fmr. director CBO & OMB, Fed vice chair); Bruce Reed (executive director; Chief of Staff to Vice President Joe Biden) |
| House of Representatives | Paul Ryan (Wisconsin); Jeb Hensarling (Texas); Dave Camp (Michigan) | John Spratt (South Carolina); Xavier Becerra (California); Jan Schakowsky (Illinois) |
| Senate | Judd Gregg (New Hampshire); Tom Coburn (Oklahoma); Mike Crapo (Idaho) | Richard Durbin (Illinois); Max Baucus (Montana); Kent Conrad (North Dakota) |

== Public outreach ==
During the time of the commission, the co-chairs spent time holding public hearings and appearing on various media outlets.

There were six public meetings of testimony and deliberation of the commission, with numerous private ones.

1. April 27, 2010 – Ben Bernanke, Federal Reserve; Director Peter Orszag, Office of Management and Budget; Rudolph Penner, The Urban Institute; Robert Reischauer, frm. Congressional Budget Office.
2. May 26, 2010 – Carmen Reinhart, Professor, University of Maryland; Carlo Cottarelli, International Monetary Fund
3. June 30, 2010 – Doug Elmendorf, Director, Congressional Budget Office; public forum featuring nearly 90 groups and individuals.
4. July 28, 2010 – Maya MacGuineas, Committee for a Responsible Federal Budget; Barry Anderson, fmr. Organisation for Economic Co-operation and Development
5. September 29, 2010 – Paul Posner, George Mason University; Janet S. Laurent, Government Accountability Office; Patricia Dalton, Government Accountability Office
6. December 1, 2010 – The Commission released its final report.

In April 2010, Al Simpson was interviewed by Neil Cavuto on Fox News, covering tax-vs-spending balance in the commission's work.

Simpson and Bowles were also interviewed by Chris Wallace on the eve of the first Commission meeting. Simpson's latter appearance, particularly as it bore on entitlements, attracted comment from the Columbia Journalism Review and James Ridgeway, among others.

== Chairmen's draft proposal ==
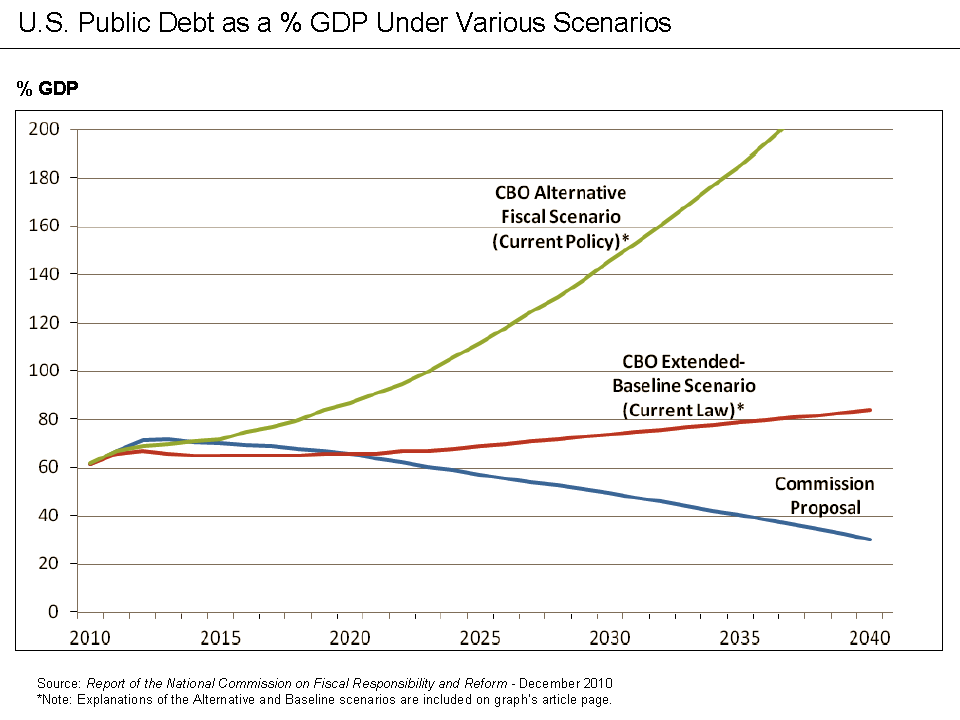
Report of the National Commission on Fiscal Responsibility and Reform-Public Debt as % GDP Under Various Scenarios

On November 10, co-chairs Simpson and Bowles released a draft proposal for consideration by other commission members providing the basis for the final report to be released later. The co-chairs proposal reduced the deficit by $4 trillion, reformed Social Security and the tax code and included health-care savings and an illustrative savings of $200 billion of discretionary cuts.

After the chairmen's briefing to the commission members, two Democratic Party members, Senator Durbin and Representative Schakowsky, publicly criticized the plan. Senator Kent Conrad (D-ND), however, declined to criticize the proposal, saying "[i]nstead of shooting this down propose an alternative. But one that does as good a job as this one does in getting us back on a sound fiscal course." Senator Judd Gregg, the senior Republican on the Senate Budget Committee, noted that the report was a "starting point."

The proposal was dismissed as "unserious" by New York Times columnist Paul Krugman for its large cuts in income tax rates. Krugman dismissed the idea that current marginal rates are a drag on economic growth. Further, he doubted that proposed combination of rate cuts and removal of deductions and loopholes will be revenue neutral, let alone increase revenue.

Union leaders such as Richard Trumka and several Democrats Representative Raul Grijalva rejected the plan saying it cut spending, especially on Social Security, too much. The Economic Policy Institute calculated that the proposed spending cuts would reduce payroll employment by roughly 1.9 million jobs by 2014, and that the resulting loss in the government's tax revenues would cut the proposal's deficit-reducing effect in half. The institute called instead for "budgeting for more desperately needed fiscal stimulus in the near-term." The chairmen's proposal was also criticized by conservative interest groups such as defense contractors, for cutting spending on defense, and Americans for Tax Reform, a group opposed to both increases in marginal rates and overall Federal revenue.

The proposal was better received by the Democrat-affiliated think tank Third Way, the Progressive Policy Institute, Representative Jim Cooper (D-Tenn.), Senator Ron Wyden (D-Oregon) and Harvard economist Greg Mankiw. Senator-elect Rand Paul (R-KY), a Tea Party supporter, stated that the proposed changes to entitlement spending should take effect sooner instead of in future decades but praised the proposal for also having "some good ideas". The Concord Coalition, a non-profit and non-partisan anti-deficit activist group, applauded the report and labeled it a "promising start."

== Final plan ==
The final plan, released on December 1, 2010, aimed to reduce the federal deficit by nearly $4 trillion, stabilizing the growth of debt held by the public by 2014, reduce debt 60 percent by 2023 and 40 percent by 2035.

Outlays would equal 21.6 percent of GDP in 2015, compared to 23.8 percent in 2010 and would fall to 21.0 percent by 2035. Revenues would rise from 14.9 percent in 2010 to 19.3 percent in 2015 and would equal 21.0 percent in 2035.

Built off a baseline called the "Plausible Baseline", which closely resembled the Congressional Budget Office's Alternative Fiscal Scenario, the plan proposed roughly $2 in spending cuts to $1 in revenue increases. The Plausible Baseline built off of a current law baseline by assuming that the 2001/2003 tax cuts were extended except for those above $250,000, the estate tax and Alternative Minimum Tax would continue at 2009 levels, the Medicare physicians pay freeze would continue and war spending would decrease based on current administration policy.

The final plan was broken down into six major components (savings are 2012–2020):

1. $1,661 billion of discretionary spending cuts by putting in place discretionary spending caps into law lower than what is projected to be spent.
2. $995 billion in additional revenue with $785 billion in new revenues from tax reform by lowering income and corporate tax rates and broadening the base by eliminating tax expenditures. An additional $210 billion in revenue is also raised in other revenue by switching to the Chained-CPI and an increase in the federal gasoline tax
3. $341 billion in federal health care savings by reforming the Sustainable Growth Rate for Medicare, repeals the CLASS Act (which has already happened), increase Medicare cost sharing, reform health-care tort, change provider payments, increase drug rebates and establishes a long-term budget for total federal health-care spending after 2020 to GDP + 1 percent.
4. $215 billion in other mandatory savings by moving to the Chained CPI for all inflation-indexed programs, reform the military and civil service retirement system, reduce farm subsidies, reduce student loans and various other reforms.
5. $238 billion in Social Security reform, to be used to ensure the program is sustainably solvent in the infinite horizon by slowing benefit growth for high and medium-income workers, increase the early and normal retirement age to 68 by 2050 and 69 by 2075 by indexing it to longevity, index cost of living adjustments to the Chained-CPI, include newly hired state and local workers after 2020, increase the payroll tax cap to cover 90 percent of wages by 2050 and creates a new minimum and old-age benefit.
6. Budget Process Reforms by creating discretionary spending caps and caps total federal revenue at 20 percent of GDP.

The plan also proposed an additional $673 billion in savings, due to lower projected spending interest payments as a result from lower deficits.

== Final vote ==
The plan, released on December 1, 2010, fell short of a supermajority during voting on December 3, with 11 of 18 votes in favor. Voting for the report were Bowles, Coburn, Conrad, Crapo, Cote, Durbin, Fudge, Gregg, Rivlin, Simpson, and Spratt. Voting against were Baucus, Becerra, Camp, Hensarling, Ryan, Schakowsky, and Stern.

On March 28, 2012, Representatives Jim Cooper (D-TN) and Steve LaTourette (R-OH) put a bill modeled on the plan, with, according to analyst Ezra Klein, "somewhat less in tax increases," to a vote in the House where it was rejected 382 to 38. 22 Democrats and 16 Republicans supported the bill.

== Reaction ==
There was mixed reaction to the plan. Some praised the recommendations of the proposal while others attacked it.

=== Praise ===
One proponent, Maya MacGuineas at the Committee for a Responsible Federal Budget, said of the plan, "the Commission released not only a credible plan, but an excellent plan. Of course it is filled with things people don't like—that is the nature of deficit reduction. And yet the plan received bipartisan support from a majority of the Commission at a time where, up until now, fiscal leadership has been in short supply"

Other prominent supporters of the plan include New York mayor Michael Bloomberg, former Chairmen of the Federal Reserve Alan Greenspan, Senator John McCain and Democratic Minority Whip Steny Hoyer.

As time has gone on, there has been increased support for the plan, including some who initially opposed it such as former union leader Andy Stern and Democratic leader Nancy Pelosi.

=== Criticism ===
The plan was not universally praised. Commission member Jan Schakowsky, who voted against the Bowles-Simpson plan, released an alternative plan of her own, proposing a liberal budget plan that would cut the deficit by $441 billion. Schakowsky's plan would raise revenue (by eliminating the FICA cap; eliminating the foreign earned income exclusion, raising the taxes on capital gains, dividends, and bonds, and establishing a cap-and-trade system taxing corporate carbon emissions); cut defense spending by $110 billion and non-defense spending by $33 billion; and spend $200 billion on infrastructure and other measures aimed at boosting economic growth.

Dean Baker of the Center for Economic and Policy Research in Washington criticized the deficit report for omitting a tax on the financial industry, as was recommended by the International Monetary Fund.

Economist and New York Times columnist Paul Krugman wrote, "Simpson–Bowles is terrible. It mucks around with taxes, but is obsessed with lowering marginal rates despite a complete absence of evidence that this is important. It offers nothing on Medicare that isn't already in the Affordable Care Act. And it raises the Social Security retirement age because life expectancy has risen completely ignoring the fact that life expectancy has only gone up for the well-off and well-educated, while stagnating or even declining among the people who need the program most."

== Continuing outreach and current status ==
Bowles-Simpson, while never officially coming to a vote, has received significant attention since its inception. The National Journal noted that, "Hardly a day goes by in Congress or on the hustings without some lawmaker extolling Simpson–Bowles as the kind of potent fiscal medicine Americans must swallow if the country is to fix its debt and deficit problems, reform government and revive the economy."

The Simpson–Bowles framework and its goal of $4 trillion of deficit reduction has been used by other, such as President Obama and Speaker Boehner in their negotiations during the summer of 2011. A Senate "Gang of Six", with Senators Mark Warner, Kent Conrad, Richard Durbin, Tom Coburn, Mike Crapo and Saxby Chambliss, was formed attempting to forge a consensus on deficit reduction. Later, Senators Mike Bennett and Mike Johans. The Gang of 6 released their plan during the summer of 2011, during the Debt Ceiling negotiations, but since then has continued to work on ways to forge a way to avoid the fiscal cliff.

Additionally, during the spring of 2012, a Budget Resolution based in part on the Simpson–Bowles plan was voted on in the House of Representatives. The plan was voted down 382–38.

Simpson and Bowles have done further outreach themselves. In November 2011, Simpson and Bowles submitted written testimony to the "supercommittee" charged with making budget adjustments by Congress, urging the 12 supercommittee members to "go big" toward the $4 trillion in savings the NCFRR had recommended v. the $1.2 trillion deficit reduction most discussed by the committee of congresspeople and senators. Simpson and Bowles also warned that failure to reach some agreement "might result in another downgrade", though separately Moody's said such failure alone would not result in a change in U.S. ratings, as the trigger would still result in $1.2 trillion in cuts. In that regard, Simpson and Bowles stated, "the only thing worse than failure by the committee to agree on savings would be removing the 'sequester' [or 'trigger'] mechanism for automatic cuts". Bowles said in verbal testimony that "[c]ollectively, I'm worried you're going to fail".

Both Simpson and Bowles have appeared on numerous media outlets discussing their plan and the current fiscal situation such as the fiscal cliff at the end of 2012 and are widely quoted in the press on fiscal issues. In addition, Simpson and Bowles have helped form two organizations that are working in part for their plan—the Moment of Truth Project and the Campaign to Fix the Debt.

Finally, some aspects of the Simpson–Bowles plan have become law. The Budget Control Act of 2011 included discretionary spending caps, albeit at a lower level. Additionally, the CLASS Act was enacted as Title VIII of the Patient Protection and Affordable Care Act but was repealed January 1, 2013.

== See also ==
- United States Congress Joint Select Committee on Deficit Reduction ("Supercommittee")
- Omnibus Budget Reconciliation Act of 1993
- Deficit Reduction Act of various years
- National Economic Commission of 1987
- United States Federal Budget
- Budget Control Act of 2011
