= Cut, Cap and Balance Act =

The proposed Cut, Cap and Balance Act of 2011 (H.R. 2560) was a bill put forward in the 112th United States Congress by Republicans during the 2011 U.S. debt ceiling crisis. The provisions of the bill included a cut in the total amount of federal government spending, a cap on the level of future spending as a percentage of GDP, and, on the condition that Congress pass certain changes to the U.S. Constitution, an increase in the national debt ceiling to allow the federal government to continue to service its debts.

The bill had the support of Republicans and much of the Tea Party movement. It passed the U.S. House of Representatives on July 19, 2011, but was rejected by the President and the Senate. The Senate voted to table the bill on July 22. President Obama had promised to veto the bill had it proceeded further.

== History ==
The House passed the bill on July 19, 2011 by a vote of 234-190 and the bill was sent to the Senate for consideration. The vote split mostly on political party lines with 229 Republicans and 5 Democrats voting for the bill, and 181 Democrats and 9 Republicans voting against. Two Republican 2012 presidential candidates voted against the bill: Ron Paul and Michele Bachmann. Paul did not support raising the debt ceiling as a matter of principle and Bachmann believed that "the motion does not go far enough in fundamentally restructuring the way Washington spends taxpayer dollars ...we must also repeal and defund ObamaCare [the Affordable Care Act].".

The bill had little chance of becoming law. It was adopted by a Republican majority in the House of Representatives, but both the presidency and the Senate were controlled by Democrats, who strongly opposed the bill. Furthermore, because the bill made an increase in the debt ceiling contingent on the passage of a constitutional amendment, the bill would, in practice, have needed the support of two-thirds of each house of Congress in order to be effective.

When the bill arrived on the floor of the Senate, Democrat and Majority Leader Harry Reid called the proposal "one of the worst pieces of legislation to ever be placed on the floor of the United States Senate." On July 22, 2011, the Senate voted to table the bill (postpone consideration of the bill indefinitely). Voting precisely followed party lines, with 51 Democrats voting to table the bill and 46 Republicans voting to bring it up for debate. One media commentator stated that: "The vote handed conservatives a chance to showcase their strategy for restricting future spending in Washington, but it faced a veto from President Barack Obama, making it more of a symbolic vote for Republicans to put their mark on deficit reduction".

== Provisions ==
The bill provided for an increase in the debt ceiling of $2.4 trillion, the figure requested by President Obama. However it tied this increase to a number of other proposals, including cuts in spending, a cap on future spending, and an amendment of the federal constitution.

=== Cuts in spending ===
The bill proposed to reduce total spending by $111 billion in FY 2012. The savings were divided as follows:

- Reduce non-security discretionary spending below 2008 levels, which saves $76 billion.
- $35 billion cut to non-veterans, non-Medicare, non-Social Security mandatory spending.
- Defense budget at President's level.

=== Cap on future spending ===
The bill proposed that federal spending would be scaled back based on the glide path for the fiscal years below as a percentage of the Gross Domestic Product (GDP):

- 2012, 22.5% of GDP.
- 2013, 21.7% of GDP.
- 2014, 20.8% of GDP.
- 2015, 20.2% of GDP.
- 2016, 20.2% of GDP.
- 2017, 20.0% of GDP.
- 2018, 19.7% of GDP.
- 2019, 19.9% of GDP.
- 2020, 19.9% of GDP.
- 2021, 19.9% of GDP.

=== Constitutional amendment ===
Supporters of the bill advocated an amendment to the U.S. Constitution requiring a balanced budget and permanently restricting the authority of Congress to spend and raise taxes. An ordinary act of Congress cannot alter the constitution or obligate Congress to do so. However the bill was intended to encourage a constitutional amendment by requiring that the debt ceiling could not be raised unless Congress passed an amendment and submitted it to the states for ratification. The constitutional amendment foreseen by the bill was one that would:

- Require a balanced budget,
- Impose a constitutional cap on federal spending as a percentage of GDP, and,
- Require that any future tax increases be supported by a supermajority of two-thirds in each house of Congress.
