= United States Congressional Joint Select Committee on Deficit Reduction =

United States Congressional committee

The Joint Select Committee on Deficit Reduction, colloquially referred to as the Supercommittee, was a joint select committee of the United States Congress, created by the Budget Control Act of 2011 on August 2, 2011. This act was intended to prevent the sovereign default that could have resulted from the 2011 United States debt-ceiling crisis. The objective of the committee was to develop a deficit reduction plan over 10 years in addition to the $917 billion of cuts and initial debt limit increase of $900 billion in the Budget Control Act of 2011 that avoided a U.S. sovereign default. The committee recommendation was to have been subject to a simple vote by the full legislative bodies without amendment; this extraordinary provision was included to limit partisan gridlock. The goal outlined in the Budget Control Act of 2011 was to cut at least $1.5 trillion over the coming 10 years (avoiding much larger "sequestration" across-the-board cuts which would be equal to the debt ceiling increase of $1.2 trillion incurred by Congress through a failure to produce a deficit reduction bill), therefore bypassing Congressional debate and resulting in a passed bill by December 23, 2011. On November 21, the committee concluded its work, issuing a statement that began with the following: "After months of hard work and intense deliberations, we have come to the conclusion today that it will not be possible to make any bipartisan agreement available to the public before the committee's deadline." The committee was formally terminated on January 31, 2012.

== Historical precedents ==
In both form and process, the Joint Select Committee on Deficit Reduction was an unusual construct in the American federal legislative system. The Base Realignment and Closure process provides a partial precedent. Senate historian Donald Ritchie found inexact parallels between the Joint Select Committee and various historical joint committees. The only precedent for the committee's power to write and report legislation is the 1946–1977 Joint Committee on Atomic Energy.

== Structure and membership ==
The committee comprised twelve members of Congress, six from the House of Representatives and six from the Senate, with each delegation evenly divided between Democrats and Republicans. Three members each were appointed by the Speaker and Minority Leader of the House and by the Majority and Minority Leaders of the Senate. Two of the members were designated as co-chairs, one each by the Senate Majority Leader and by the Speaker of the House. The law made no requirement that either chair be from a specific house or a specific party. The Los Angeles Times predicted before the committee was constituted that the "most important players" in the process would be the four leaders selecting the twelve committee members. Commentators noted that the plan would advance with a seven-member majority if any single member deviated from party lines.

=== Members ===
On August 9, Senate Majority Leader Harry Reid, announced the Senate's Democratic members of the committee. Speaker John Boehner and Senate Minority Leader Mitch McConnell announced the Republican appointments to the committee from both houses on August 10, 2011. House Minority Leader Nancy Pelosi announced her choices on the following day.

	Majority	Minority
Senate members	Patty Murray, Washington, Co-Chair; Max Baucus, Montana; John Kerry, Massachusetts	Jon Kyl, Arizona; Rob Portman, Ohio; Pat Toomey, Pennsylvania
House members	Jeb Hensarling, Texas, Co-Chair; Fred Upton, Michigan; Dave Camp, Michigan	Xavier Becerra, California; Jim Clyburn, South Carolina; Chris Van Hollen, Maryland

Murray was serving as the Senate Democratic Conference Secretary, chair of the Senate Committee on Veterans' Affairs, and chair of the Democratic Senatorial Campaign Committee. Hensarling was vice-chair of the House Committee on Financial Services, chairman emeritus of the Republican Study Committee, and House Republican Conference Chair.

Kerry and Baucus were each chairing standing Senate committees (Foreign Relations and Finance, respectively), members of the Senate Finance Committee and were among the ten most senior members of the U.S. Senate. Kyl was Senate Minority Whip. Toomey was a member of the Joint Economic Committee. Portman was a former director of the Office of Management and Budget and a former U.S. Trade Representative.

Camp was chairing the House Committee on Ways and Means and the Joint Committee on Taxation. Upton was chairing the House Committee on Energy and Commerce. Clyburn was the third-ranking House Democrat. Becerra was the ranking member of the Ways and Means Social Security Subcommittee and was vice-chair of the House Democratic Caucus. Van Hollen was the ranking member of the House Budget Committee and had formerly chaired the Democratic Congressional Campaign Committee.

Baucus, Becerra, Camp, and Hensarling had served on the National Commission on Fiscal Responsibility and Reform; all four had voted against the Simpson-Bowles plan that emerged from that committee.

== Operation ==
The Budget Control Act increased the debt ceiling by $400 billion in August 2011. Concurrently, it required the federal government to make $917 billion in spending cuts over a ten-year period as a first installment. This was based on estimates by the Congressional Budget Office using current-law economic baseline, including the expiration of the Bush tax cuts. Under the Act, government revenues were projected to rise after 2012.

=== Recommendation ===
The committee was charged with issuing a recommendation by November 23, 2011, for at least $1.5 trillion in additional deficit reduction steps to be undertaken over a ten‐year period. This would have been the second installment of deficit reduction measures. Possible areas to be examined by the committee included: revenue increases, including raising taxes; tax reforms, such as simplifying the tax code and eliminating some tax breaks and loopholes; military spending cuts; and measures to reform and slow the growth of entitlement programs, including Medicare, Medicaid, and Social Security. According to White House economics adviser Gene Sperling, "everything is on the table."

=== Congressional vote ===
The committee's recommendations were to have been put to a simple up or down vote by Congress by December 23, 2011. The vote would not have been subject to amendments, House "majority of the majority" blocks, or Senate filibusters, guaranteeing a pure majority vote in both chambers. A "trigger mechanism" was included in the bill to enact $1.2 trillion in automatic spending cuts in the event that the committee could not agree on a recommendation or the full Congress failed to pass it. The bill stipulated that this automatic second installment of deficit reduction measures be split between the national security and domestic arenas, with the biggest entitlement programs excluded. The targeting of the automatic cuts was intended to provide incentives to both sides to compromise.

=== Hearings and meetings ===
While the majority of the committee's business was conducted through private negotiations, five hearings and meetings are public record.

- September 8, 2011: Organizational Meeting
- September 13, 2011: Hearing on The History and Drivers of Our Nation's Debt and Its Threats
- September 22, 2011: Hearing - Overview: Revenue Options and Reforming the Tax Code
- October 26, 2011: Hearing - Overview: Discretionary Outlays, Security and Non-Security
- November 1, 2011: Hearing - Overview of Previous Debt Proposals

== Debate over merit ==
=== Support ===
Supporters believed that the prospect of imminent across–the–board spending cuts if the committee's measures were not adopted would be sufficiently "distasteful to lawmakers" to prompt them to act and to impart a "strong incentive for bipartisan agreement." Representative Rob Andrews of New Jersey supported the idea as a way to "avoid a default" although he expressed concerns that it would take too long for lawmakers to learn the "nuances of Medicare and Medicaid" with respect to intricate reimbursement formulas.

=== Criticism ===
Criticism of the committee arrangement included comments from lawmakers concerned by how rapidly the Budget Control Act legislation was put together; they objected to having little time to review the rules by which the committee would operate, and to the lack of input on the mechanism from public hearings or debate. Legislators from both major parties expressed concern that the arrangement would "usurp their authority to write and revise legislation." Presidential candidate Representative Ron Paul suggested that members of Congress might be under "tremendous pressure" to vote for the committee's recommendation regardless of its merit. Huffington Post critic R. W. Sanders described the committee as "unelected" with power to "effectively run our country" and possibly issue budget cuts that would "basically go unchallenged." Senator Bob Menendez predicted that the committee would become deadlocked with a "stacked deck" of members opposed to new revenues. An analysis in The New York Times described the committee as similar to other "blue-ribbon panels" established during the past seventy years as a way to "give political cover to policy makers to make unpopular changes"; in most past cases Congress has ignored the panel proposals or procrastinated enacting them. A future Congress could override any decisions made, since one Congress cannot "bind another." A variety of watchdog groups, including Public Campaign and MoveOn.org, were concerned that lobbyists would influence the proceedings, and asked that lawmakers disclose meetings with lobbyists and refrain from political fundraising during the selection process. Standard & Poor's was pessimistic at the outset regarding the chance for serious fiscal reform; the agency downgraded the nation's credit rating from AAA to AA+, writing:

... The downgrade reflects our view that the effectiveness, stability, and predictability of American policymaking and political institutions have weakened at a time of ongoing fiscal and economic challenges ... (we are) pessimistic about the capacity of Congress and the Administration to be able to leverage their agreement this week into a broader fiscal consolidation plan that stabilizes the government's debt dynamics any time soon. The outlook on the long-term rating is negative.

— Standard & Poor's, August 2011

Analyst Fareed Zakaria predicted the committee would deadlock without a majority favoring a specific plan, writing:

It's a punt. I mean, it's one more occasion where Congress has basically punted, kicked the can down the road, use what metaphor you want. It cuts $21 billion out of the 2012 budget, which is the only budget over which this Congress actually has any authority ... The Democrats are saying no cuts to entitlements. The Republicans are saying no taxes. That's great except we all know the only solution to our long-term debt problem is cuts in entitlements and new taxes.

== Impasse and failure ==
The initial proposal from the Democrats on the committee offered 3 trillion in deficit reduction, including 1.3 trillion in new revenue and 400 billion in Medicare savings, but was rejected on partisan lines for the level of tax increases. The Republican Toomey plan proposed 1.2 trillion in deficit reduction, including 300 billion in new revenue, but was rejected because it lowered the top marginal tax rate from 35% to 28%.

The final agreement would have needed to undergo a 48-hour vetting period by the Congressional Budget Office before being presented to Congress. After financial markets closed on Monday November 21, 2011, the committee issued a statement that it had failed to reach agreement. This failure despite the extraordinary conditions under which the committee operated was viewed by both sides as a missed opportunity and a triumph of political ideology over genuine leadership. An ORC International poll conducted November 11–13 reports that 19% of respondents would hold both parties responsible for failure to reach an agreement; 32% of respondents thought Democrats would have a greater responsibility, and 42% Republicans (±3%). A Quinnipiac University Polling Institute poll conducted November 14–20 indicates that voters blamed the looming impasse on Congressional Republicans 44% to 38% (±1.9%) over President Obama and Congressional Democrats. A Gallup poll conducted on November 21 after the announcement finds that 55% apportioned blame equally to the Republicans and the Democrats on the committee, with 24% blaming the Republican members more and 15% blaming the Democratic members more (±4%).

Committee co-chair Jeb Hensarling blamed Democratic committee members for insisting on "a minimum of $1 trillion in higher taxes" and unwillingness to agree to "structural reforms" to health-care entitlement programs. Jon Kyl framed the failure as a question of the scope and size of the government and whether the deficit could best be dealt with by increased taxes or by increased economic growth. Pat Toomey called his proposal a "genuine compromise" that included increased tax revenues by reforming and simplifying the tax code, as well as spending reductions. The Republican presidential candidates have each stated that deficit reduction should not include any tax increases. Phil Kerpen of Americans for Prosperity celebrated the impasse as preventing a "poorly-timed tax hike". Republicans have also criticized Obama for his hands-off approach; the president was out of the country during the final week of negotiations.

Committee co-chair Patty Murray blamed Republican committee members for insisting that the "wealthiest Americans and biggest corporations be protected from paying a penny more" at the expense of the middle class. John Kerry put the blame on "the Republican insistence on making tax cuts for the wealthiest Americans permanent", referring to the Bush tax cuts due to expire in 2013. Nancy Pelosi blamed Republican rejection of a "balanced approach", and Harry Reid put the point of no compromise on the Republican proposal to privatize Medicare. Former Secretary of Defense William Cohen outlined the likely consequences of sequester to the defense budget, calling on Congressional Republicans to choose between "rigid antitax ideology" and national defense.

== Aftermath ==
Deficit reduction and the automatic cuts scheduled to take effect in January 2013 were viewed as likely to figure in the 2012 presidential election. President Obama stated that he would veto any attempt by Congress to cancel the $1.2 trillion sequester. These sequestrations figured prominently in the United States fiscal cliff discussions starting in 2012.

US financial markets largely anticipated the failure of the committee, leaving little room to fall following the announcement. The Dow was down 2.1% on the day of the announcement, and the NASDAQ and S&P 500 were each down 1.9%. Yield on ten year treasuries fell to 1.96% on increased demand for stable investments. Credit rating agencies maintained their projections for US sovereign debt. Standard & Poor's affirmed their AA+ rating; the agency had downgraded the country's credit rating in August 2011, citing Congressional resistance to new revenue measures and fears that the tax cuts of 2001 and 2003 might not be allowed to expire. Moody's affirmed a rating of AAA with a negative outlook. Fitch Ratings affirmed its AAA rating but revised their outlook to negative, citing "declining confidence that timely fiscal measures necessary to place U.S. public finances on a sustainable path ... will be forthcoming."

Following the announcement that the committee had failed to reach agreement, a group of government watchdog organizations posted an open letter to President Obama and ranking members of Congress calling for the release of committee working documents. It argues that the proposals could serve the public interest by providing a basis for public debate going forward. The group comprised Taxpayers for Common Sense, the Project On Government Oversight, the Sunlight Foundation, OpenSecrets, Citizens Against Government Waste, The Heartland Institute, and Citizens for Responsibility and Ethics in Washington. Except for the five public hearings, the committee proceedings comprising the majority of the negotiations and counter-offers will remain sealed for 20 years under current rules.
