= Research Centre for Urban Studies, Heriot-Watt University =

Research institute in Edinburgh, Scotland

The Research Centre for Urban Studies (RCUS), formally the Urban Institute, is a research center for urban issues at Heriot-Watt University in Edinburgh, Scotland, United Kingdom. It was founded in 2016 under the leadership of Professor Dr. Mark Stephens. The institute runs a number of research projects in Edinburgh. It also offers joint post-graduate programs accredited by RTPI and RICS. The Urban Institute is part of the UK Collaborative Centre for Housing Evidence, one of the four centres in the UK.
