= National Economic Commission =

1987 US deficit reduction commission

The National Economic Commission was failed bipartisan U.S. deficit reduction commission created by the U.S. Congress in December 1987.
