= Budget Control Act of 2011 =

United States law

- Long title: An Act to provide for budget control.
- Enacted by: the 112th United States Congress
- Effective: August 2, 2011

Citations
- Public law: Pub. L. 112–25 (text) (PDF)
- Statutes at Large: 125 Stat. 239

Codification
- Acts amended: Balanced Budget and Emergency Deficit Control Act of 1985; Congressional Budget and Impoundment Control Act of 1974; Deficit Reduction Act of 2005
- Titles amended: 2 U.S.C.: Congress
- U.S.C. sections amended: 2 U.S.C. ch. 20 § 901

Legislative history
- Introduced in the Senate as "An original bill to make a technical amendment to the Education Sciences Reform Act of 2002" (S. 365) by Tom Harkin (D-IA) on February 16, 2011; Committee consideration by Senate Health, Education, Labor, and Pensions Committee; Passed the Senate on February 17, 2011 (Unanimous consent); Passed the House as the "Budget Control Act of 2011" on August 1, 2011 (269–161) with amendment; Senate agreed to House amendment on August 2, 2011 (74–26); Signed into law by President Barack Obama on August 2, 2011

The Budget Control Act of 2011 (Pub. L. 112–25 (text) (PDF), S. 365, 125 Stat. 240, enacted August 2, 2011) is a federal statute enacted by the 112th United States Congress and signed into law by US President Barack Obama on August 2, 2011. The Act brought conclusion to the 2011 US debt-ceiling crisis.

The law involves the introduction of several complex mechanisms, such as creation of the Congressional Joint Select Committee on Deficit Reduction (sometimes called the "super committee"), options for a balanced budget amendment, and automatic budget sequestration.

== Provisions ==
=== Debt ceiling ===
- The debt ceiling was increased by $400 billion immediately.
- The President could request a further increase of $500 billion, which is subject to a congressional motion of disapproval which the President may veto, in which case a two-thirds majority in Congress would be needed to override the veto. This has been called the "McConnell mechanism" after the Senate Minority Leader Mitch McConnell, who first suggested it as part of another scheme.
- The President could request a final increase of $1.2–1.5 trillion, subject to the same disapproval procedure. The exact amount depends on the amount of cuts in the "super committee" plan if it passes Congress, and whether a balanced budget amendment has been sent to the states.

=== Deficit reduction ===
- Spending was reduced more than the increase in the debt limit. No tax increases or other forms of increases in revenue above current law were included in the bill.
- The bill directly specified $917 billion of cuts over 10 years in exchange for the initial debt limit increase of $900 billion. This is the first installment ("tranche") of cuts. $21 billion of this will be applied in the FY2012 budget.
- Additionally, the agreement established the Joint Select Committee on Deficit Reduction, sometimes called the "super committee", to produce deficit reduction legislation by November 23, 2011, that would be immune from amendments or filibuster (similar to the Base Realignment and Closure). The goal of the legislation was to cut at least $1.5 trillion over the coming 10 years and be passed by December 23, 2011. Projected revenue from the committee's legislation could not exceed the revenue budgeting baseline produced by current law. (Current law had the Bush tax cuts expiring at the end of 2012.) The committee would have 12 members, 6 from each party.
- The agreement also specified an incentive for Congress to act. If Congress failed to produce a deficit reduction bill with at least $1.2 trillion in cuts, then Congress could grant a $1.2 trillion increase in the debt ceiling but this would trigger across-the-board cuts ("sequestrations" (Note: The sequestration mechanism would be the same as what was used before in the Balanced Budget Act of 1997.)), as of January 2, 2013. These cuts would apply to mandatory and discretionary spending in the years 2013 to 2021 and be in an amount equal to the difference between $1.2 trillion and the amount of deficit reduction enacted from the joint committee. There would be some exemptions: reductions would apply to Medicare providers, but not to Social Security, Medicaid, civil and military employee pay, or veterans. Medicare benefits would be limited to a 2% reduction.
  As originally envisioned, these caps would equally affect security and non-security programs. Security programs would include the Department of Defense, the Department of Homeland Security, the Department of Veterans Affairs, the National Nuclear Security Administration, some management functions of the intelligence community, and international affairs from the Department of State. However, because the Joint Select Committee did not report any legislation to Congress, the act reset these caps to defense (essentially the Department of Defense) and non-defense categories. This became one of the important elements of the fiscal cliff.

=== Balanced Budget Amendment ===
- Congress was required to vote on a balanced budget amendment between October 1, 2011, and the end of 2011, but is not required to pass it and send it to the states in order for the debt limit increases to occur. (This is unlike the previously proposed Cut, Cap and Balance Act, which was not enacted, which would have required Congress to actually pass such an amendment).

=== Other provisions ===
- Pell Grant funding was increased, but other financial aid was cut. Graduate and professional students were no longer eligible for interest subsidized loans. Repayment incentives will also be done away with after July 1, 2012.
- Section 106 of the Budget Control Act amends the Congressional Budget Act of 1974 to provide a two-year Senate budget, adopting in law what would usually be a Concurrent Resolution. Senate Budget Committee Chairman explains in this video.

== Legislative history ==
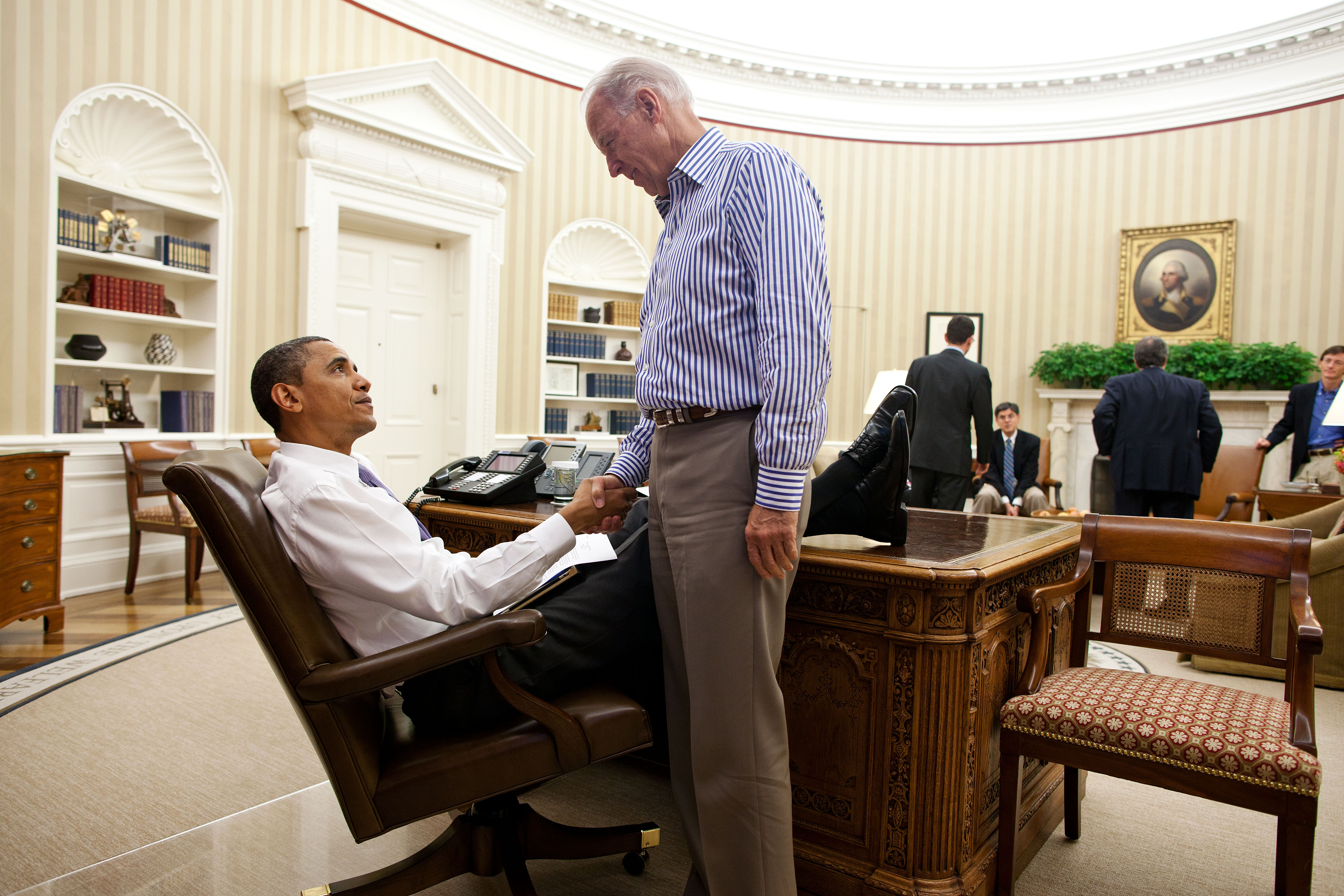
Vice President Biden shook hands and congratulated President Obama immediately after a call between the president and Speaker Boehner in which they reached a deal for the Budget Control Act, July 31, 2011.

House vote by congressional district. Democratic yea Democratic nay Republican yea Republican nay Absent or no representative seated

The bill was the final chance in a series of proposals to resolve the 2011 United States debt-ceiling crisis, which featured bitter divisions between the parties and also pronounced splits within them. Earlier ideas included the Obama-Boehner $4 trillion "Grand Bargain", the House Republican Cut, Cap and Balance Act, and the McConnell-Reid "Plan B" fallback. All eventually failed to gain enough general political or specific Congressional support to move into law, as the midnight August 2, 2011, deadline for an unprecedented U.S. sovereign default drew nearer and nearer.

The solution came from White House National Economic Council Director Gene Sperling, who, on July 12, 2011, proposed a compulsory trigger that would go into effect if another agreement was not made on tax increases and/or budget cuts equal to or greater than the debt ceiling increase by a future date.

Ultimately, the intent of the sequester was to secure the commitment of both sides to future negotiation by means of an enforcement mechanism that would be unpalatable to Republicans and Democrats alike. President Obama agreed to the plan. House Speaker John Boehner expressed reservations, but also agreed.

On July 26, 2011, White House Budget Director Jack Lew and White House Legislative Affairs Director Rob Nabors met with Senate Majority Leader Harry Reid to discuss the plan. Reid, like Boehner several days before, was initially opposed to the idea, but was eventually convinced to go along with it, with the understanding that the sequester was intended as an enforcement tool rather than a true budget proposal.

On the evening of July 31, 2011, President Obama announced that the leaders of both parties in both chambers had reached an agreement that would reduce the deficit and avoid default. The same day, Speaker of the House John Boehner's office outlined the agreement for House Republicans. One key element in the deal being reached and the logjam being broken earlier that afternoon was U.S. Vice President Joe Biden's ability to negotiate with his 25-year Senate colleague, Senate Minority Leader Mitch McConnell. Vice President Biden had spent the most time bargaining with Congress on the debt question of anyone in the administration, and McConnell had viewed him as the one most trustworthy.

"Passed with amendment by recorded vote"
Vote by party	Yea	Nay	NV	Total
Democrats	95	95	3	193
Republicans	174	66	0	240
Total	269	161	3	433

=== House vote ===
The House passed the Budget Control Act on August 1, 2011, by a vote of 269–161. 174 Republicans and 95 Democrats voted for it, while 66 Republicans and 95 Democrats voted against it.

"Agreed in the House amendment to the bill by Yea-Nay Vote"
Vote by party	Yea	Nay	NV	Total
Democrats	45	6	0	51
Republicans	28	19	0	47
Independents	1	1	0	2
Total	74	26	0	100

House Speaker Boehner then announced that he got "98% of what I wanted" in the deal.

=== Senate vote ===
Senate vote by state. Both yes One yes, one didn't vote One yes, one no One no, one didn't vote Both no

The Senate passed the Act on August 2, 2011, by a vote of 74–26. 6 Democrats and 19 Republicans voted against it.

=== Presidential signature ===
President Obama signed the bill shortly after it was passed by the Senate. In doing so, the president said, "Is this the deal I would have preferred? No. But this compromise does make a serious down payment on the deficit reduction we need, and gives each party a strong incentive to get a balanced plan done before the end of the year."

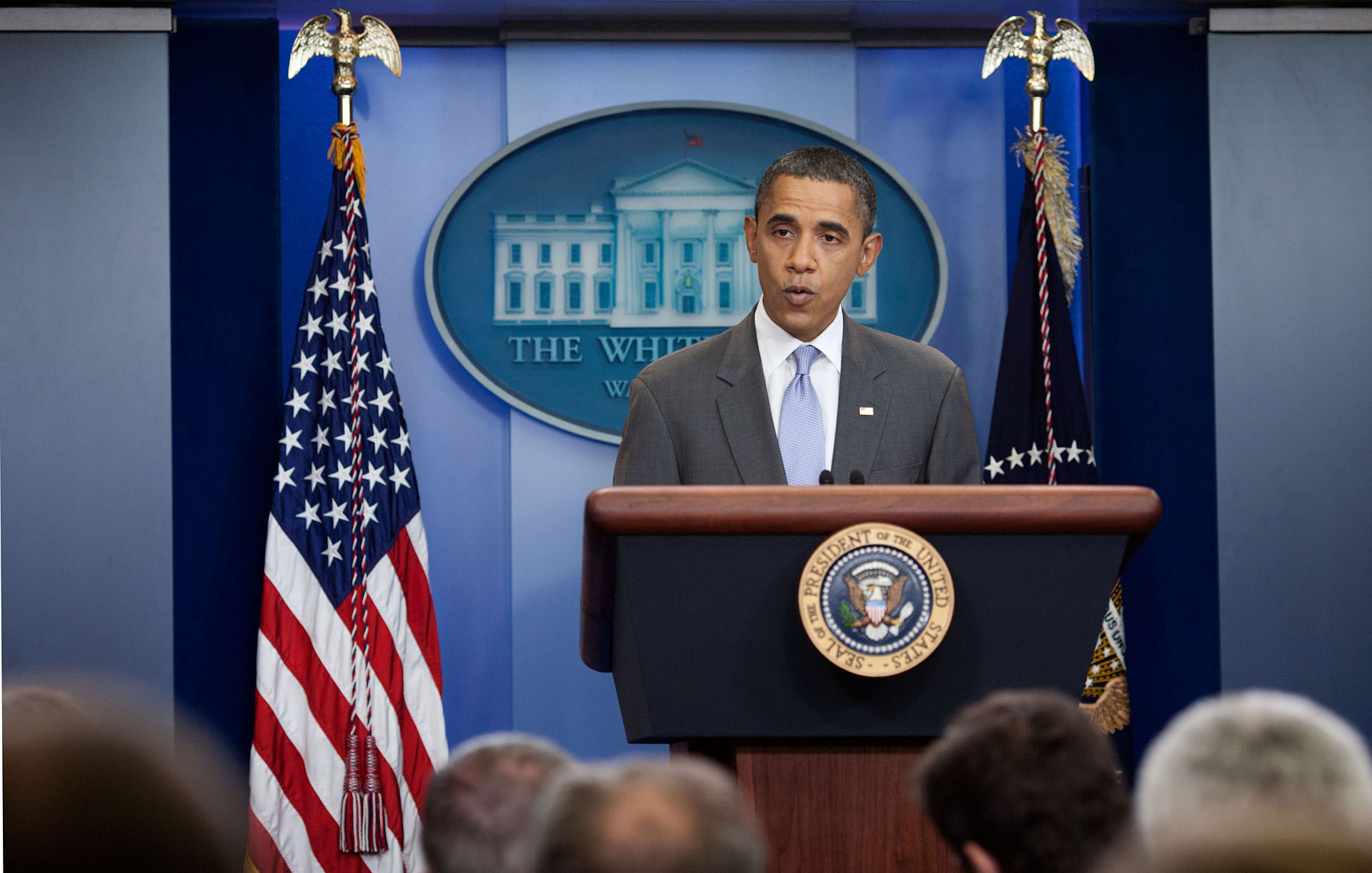
President Obama publicly announced the debt ceiling deal on the evening of July 31, 2011; Congress began voting on it the next day.

== Contingent votes ==
The Budget Control Act immediately raised the debt limit to $14.694 trillion. In October 2011, the president requested the $500 billion increase, to $15.194 trillion. A motion in the Senate to block it failed 45–52, so the increase was approved.

On November 18, 2011, the Balanced Budget Amendment failed to advance in the House: 261–165, 23 votes short of the needed 2/3 majority. On December 14, 2011, two proposed Balanced Budget Amendments failed in the Senate, 21–79 and 47–53.

On November 21, 2011, the Joint Select Committee on Deficit Reduction announced that it was not able to advance any legislation to the full Congress, issuing a statement that began with the following: "After months of hard work and intense deliberations, we have come to the conclusion today that it will not be possible to make any bipartisan agreement available to the public before the committee's deadline."

In January 2012, the U.S. debt hit the new limit of $15.194 trillion and the treasury began using extraordinary measures once again. The President requested the final increase, to $16.394 trillion. On January 18, 2012, the House passed a disapproval of the second debt limit increase by a vote of 239–176. The measure failed to pass the Senate and the debt limit was raised accordingly on January 27.

== Projected and known impacts ==
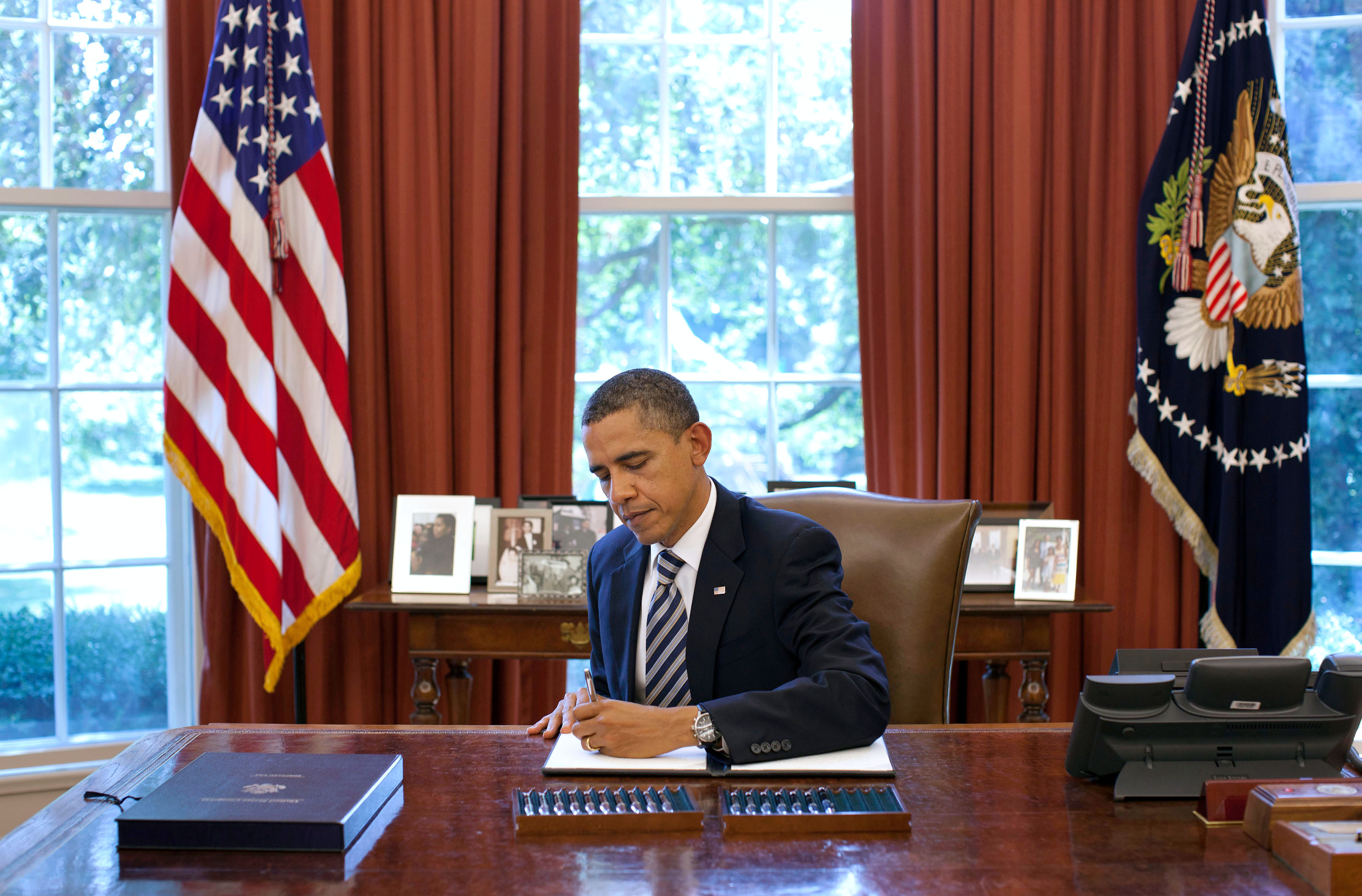
Congressional passage of the bill gave President Obama the chance to sign the Budget Control Act into law, which he did on August 2, 2011.

The act will not actually reduce the nominal U.S. debt over the 10-year period. But it will reduce the real (inflation adjusted) growth of the debt, by reducing real Federal spending (the amount of spending with inflation included). However, every plan will increase or keep constant nominal spending. That is partly because the cuts due to the act will not reduce federal spending in contemporary dollars, but rather reduce the year-to-year increases in spending from what had previously been anticipated. Even with the slowdown, both federal spending and the debt were still projected to grow faster than the U.S. economy, due to the cost curve effects of health care, which the act does not address. However, it is hoped that an independent cost-cutting board created by the Patient Protection and Affordable Care Act will begin to reduce per capita health spending once it is implemented in 2014.

The debate on the bill was driven by the Republicans' insistence on spending cuts as their condition for agreeing to raise the debt ceiling. This raised concern because of the relationship between aggregate demand and unemployment; as Patrick Lunsford, Senior Editor of insideARM.com stated in a Forbes magazine blog, "when government spending is slashed, jobs are lost and consumer demand falls." In analyzing the specific bill that emerged, the Economic Policy Institute stated, "The spending cuts in 2013 and the failure to continue two key supports to the economy (the payroll tax holiday and emergency unemployment benefits for the long term unemployed) could lead to roughly 1.8 million fewer jobs in 2013, relative to current budget policy." Most of the $900 billion in the first tranche of cuts occur in future years and so will not remove significant aggregate demand from the economy in the current and following year. Only $25 billion in federal discretionary spending is required to be removed for 2012. Regarding the across-the-board cuts, these will take effect on January 2, 2013, unless the Republicans in the US House can agree on a substitute with the Democratic president and US Senate.

Passage of the Budget Control Act of 2011 was not enough to avert, three days later, Standard & Poor's downgrading the nation's credit rating for the first time in the firm's history, from "AAA" (highest) to "AA+" (second highest). They said they were "pessimistic about the capacity of Congress and the administration to be able to leverage their agreement this week into a broader fiscal consolidation plan that stabilizes the government's debt dynamics anytime soon." (The United States Department of the Treasury pointed out an error of $2 trillion in Standard & Poor's calculation of the ten-year deficit reduction under the Act, and commented, "The magnitude of this mistake – and the haste with which S&P changed its principal rationale for action when presented with this error – raise fundamental questions about the credibility and integrity of S&P’s ratings action.") S&P has partially disputed this claim of error, arguing that it is not as substantial as the Department of the Treasury is asserting, stating, "In taking a longer term horizon of 10 years, the U.S. net general government debt level with the current assumptions would be $20.1 trillion (85% of 2021 GDP). With the original assumptions, the debt level was projected to be $22.1 trillion (93% of 2021 GDP)." They further state that they used a spending inflation rate of only 5 percent in their calculations which is actually lower than the 7 percent spending inflation rate the Budget Control Act of 2011 assumes. While the other two credit rating agencies (Fitch and Moody) kept the U.S. rating at AAA, they did change the rating outlook from "stable" to "negative".

=== 2012 election and layoff impacts ===
A 1988 Federal law requires most United States employers with 100 or more employees to provide sixty- (60) calendar-day advance notification of plant closings and mass layoffs of employees. With the scheduled sequestration reductions in Federal spending required by the Budget Control Act of 2011 due to take effect on January 2, 2013, several U.S. companies with large Federal contracts began to publicly discuss in the summer of 2012 the required layoffs that would be required to bring their workforce into line with the reductions in Federal spending.

A 394-page White House report was issued in mid-September outlining the billions of dollars in cuts that would be required in January 2013 unless U.S. law is changed prior to January 2, 2013.

Some companies have publicly stated that they would not send out the required notices, based on White House assurances, despite no change to the underlying Federal law. In October 2012, Lockheed Martin announced that they would not send out Worker Adjustment and Retraining Notification Act letters in 2012 in anticipation of sequestration cuts. Additionally, in September 2012, the Obama Administration, released a report stating that sequestration is a bad policy, and that Congress can and should take action to avoid it by passing a comprehensive and balanced deficit reduction package.

=== Defense sequestration ===
After several months of denying that they could or would plan for the implementation of sequestration cuts, the Department of Defense finally began such planning in December 2012, with less than one month to go. The nature of the budget cuts have had the most significant impact on Operations and Maintenance (O&M) accounts, particularly for the training and readiness of combat units during their "at home" cycle between overseas deployments. For example, as of April 17, 2016, out of 276 F/A-18 Hornet strike fighters in the U.S. Marine Corps inventory, only about 30% are ready to fly, according to statistics provided by the Marine Corps. Similarly, only 42 of 147 heavy-lift CH-53E Super Stallion helicopters are airworthy.

== Later developments ==
The start of the sequestration was delayed from January 2, 2013, to March 1, 2013, by the American Taxpayer Relief Act of 2012, which was passed by both houses of Congress on January 1, 2013, as a partial resolution to the fiscal cliff crisis. The bill also lowered the sequestration cap for 2014 to offset the two-month delay in 2013. Also, for 2013 only, certain "security" funding such as homeland security and international affairs were included in the sequestration cut in order to lessen the cuts to defense.

In December 2013, the Bipartisan Budget Act of 2013 increased the sequestration caps for fiscal years 2014 and 2015 by $45 billion and $18 billion, respectively, in return for extending the imposition of the cuts to mandatory spending into 2022 and 2023, and miscellaneous savings elsewhere in the budget.

== See also ==
- Budget sequestration
- Budget Enforcement Act of 1990
- Gramm–Rudman–Hollings Balanced Budget Act
- United States fiscal cliff
- United States public debt
