= Debt ceiling crisis =

Debt ceiling crisis may refer to one of these events in the United States debt ceiling history:

- 1995 United States debt-ceiling crisis, part of the 1995–1996 United States federal government shutdowns
- 2011 United States debt-ceiling crisis
- 2013 United States debt-ceiling crisis
- 2023 United States debt-ceiling crisis
