= RusRating =

Credit rating agency of Russia

- Type: Closed joint-stock company (CJSC)
- Industry: Financial services
- Founded: 2001; 25 years ago
- Founder: Richard Hainsworth
- Headquarters: Moscow, Russia
- Area served: Russia
- Products: Credit rating
- Owner: Business Alliance
- Website: www.rusrating.ru

RusRating (Russian: Рус-Рейтинг) is a Russian credit rating agency located in Moscow that was founded in 2001. Its main activity is assigning credit ratings to commercial banks, leasing companies, industrial enterprises, bank bonds, as well as research of the banking sector.

As of 2013, Kommersant said it was the smallest credit ratings agency in the country, with about 30 customers and about 4 percent of the market.

== History ==
The agency was launched in 2001. In February 2008, Rus-Rating joined the group of rating agencies that decided to follow in their work the Code of Professional Ethics of Russian Rating Agencies that was approved by the Russian Council of the National Securities Market Association.

In October 2012, Dagong Global Credit Rating stated that they will cooperate with Egan-Jones Ratings Company and RusRating to form a joint venture called Universal Credit Rating Group.

The Universal Credit Rating Group would be located in Hong Kong, and started working 6 months after signing the agreement. The joint venture would also give countries credit ratings. Managing director of Egan-Jones Ratings Bill Hassiepen told that the three rating agencies will not merge, but will participate in a strategic alliance. The three companies services will market together but will work singly he said.

On June 25, 2013, a new international rating agency, Universal Credit Rating Group, was launched jointly by Rus-Rating, Dagong Global Credit Rating and Egan-Jones Ratings. The agency positions itself as an alternative to the "big three" Fitch Ratings, Standard & Poor's and Moody's. The headquarters of the company was located in Hong Kong.

In December 2013, the founder of Rus-Rating Richard Hainsworth and partners sold 100% of the company's shares to Alexander Zaitsev, who previously held senior positions in Sberbank CIB, Troika Dialog and Uralsib Capital Management.

In March 2015, the former deputy head of the Moscow Main Territorial Department of the Central Bank of the Russian Federation Sergey Ablyaev became the owner of 51% of the company's shares.

In March 2016, Dmitry Lyubinin, the owner of the leasing company CJSC Business Alliance, acquired 100% of the company's shares.

Ownership of the agency changed hands twice in 2015-2016 and shortly afterwards it closed.
