= Universal Credit Rating Group =

Credit ratings agency

Universal Credit Rating Group (UCRG)
- Industry: Financial services
- Founded: 2013 in Hong Kong
- Founder: Dagong Global Credit Rating, Egan-Jones Ratings Company, and RusRating
- Headquarters: Hong Kong, China
- Area served: Asia
- Products: Credit ratings
- Website: www.ucrgratings.com

Universal Credit Rating Group (UCRG; Chinese: 世界信用評級集團) was a credit rating agency joint venture of capital from the US, China and Russia. UCRG was based in Hong Kong and designed to rival western credit rating agencies.

== History ==
Plans to create UCRG were announced in October 2012, and it was officially founded in Hong Kong in June 2013, as a partnership between Dagong Global Credit, Egan-Jones Ratings, and RusRating.

In 2014, it described itself as the only international credit rating agency based in the Asia Pacific area.

On 23 June 2014, UCRG announced its 2015-20 operating plan along with the formation of an advisory council to the group chaired by former French Prime Minister Dominique de Villepin. The other initial members are former Australian Prime Minister Kevin Rudd, former Pakistan Prime Minister Shaukat Aziz and former Russian Foreign Minister Igor Ivanov.
