= United States federal government credit-rating downgrades =

Declines in estimated credit worthiness

Several credit rating agencies around the world have downgraded their credit ratings of the U.S. federal government, including Standard & Poor's (S&P) which reduced the country's rating from AAA (outstanding) to AA+ (excellent) on August 5, 2011.

== 2011 ==
The 2011 S&P downgrade was the first time the US federal government was given a rating below AAA. S&P had announced a negative outlook on the AAA rating in April 2011. The downgrade to AA+ occurred four days after the 112th United States Congress voted to raise the debt ceiling of the federal government by means of the Budget Control Act of 2011 on August 2, 2011. Later, the US Government commenced an investigation into S&P's role in the rating of several mortgage-backed securities which played a role in the 2008 financial crisis. In order to mend its relationship with the US government, S&P asked its then-CEO to step down, a mere 18 days after the US was downgraded. S&P announced on August 23, 2011, that Deven Sharma would step down as a Chief of Standard & Poor's effective September 12, 2011, and would leave the company by end of the year.

The downgrade was criticized by the U.S. Treasury Department, both Democratic and Republican Party political figures, and many business people and economists.

Both Fitch Ratings and Moody's, designated like S&P as nationally recognized statistical rating organizations (NRSRO) by the U.S. Securities and Exchange Commission (SEC), retained the U.S.'s triple-A rating. Moody's, however, changed its outlook to negative on June 2, 2011, and Fitch changed its outlook to negative on November 28, 2011.

=== Background ===
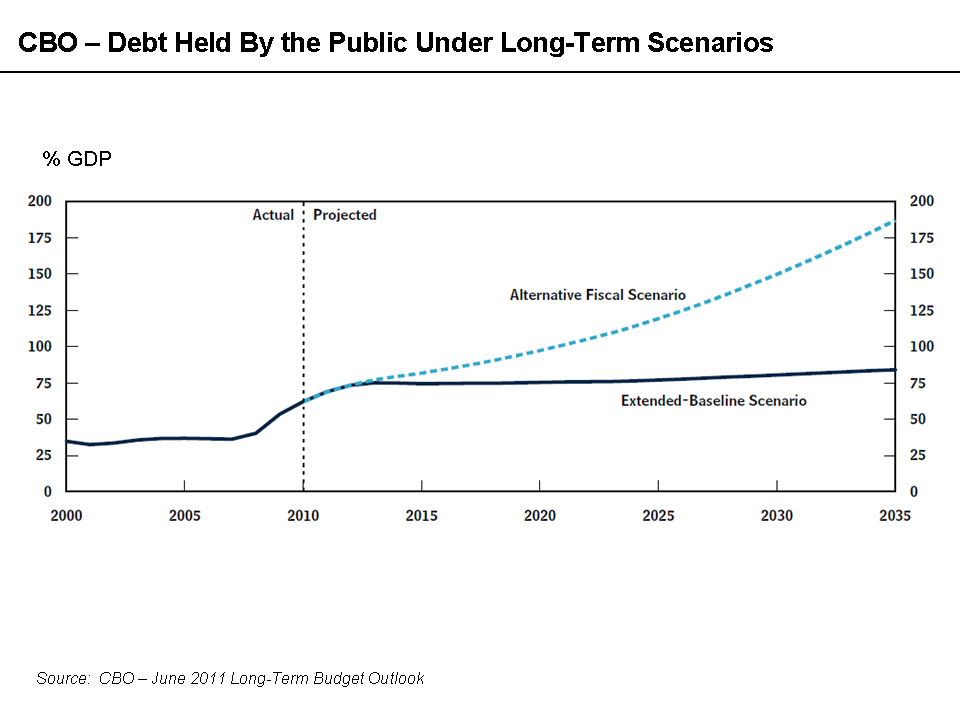
CBO-Public Debt Under "Extended" and "Alternate" Scenarios

A credit rating is issued by a credit rating agency (CRA). A credit rating assigned to U.S. sovereign debt is an expression of how likely the assigning CRA thinks it is that the U.S. will pay back its debts. A credit rating assigned to U.S. sovereign debt also influences the interest rates the U.S. will have to pay on its debt; if its debtholders know the debt will be paid back, they do not have to price the chance of default into the interest rate. However, these ratings sometimes measure different things; for instance Moody's considers the expected value of the debt in the event of a default in addition to the probability of default. Some lenders also have contractual requirements only to hold debt above a certain credit rating.

The U.S. enjoyed the "gold standard" of triple-A ratings from all three agencies (Fitch, Moody's and S&P) from the time of their recognition as standards by the SEC until the S&P downgrade in early August 2011.

Government agencies such as the Government Accountability Office, the Congressional Budget Office, the Office of Management and Budget, and the U.S. Treasury Department have all reported that the federal government is facing a series of important financing challenges. In the short-run, tax revenues have declined significantly due to a severe recession and tax-policy choices, while expenditures have expanded for wars, unemployment insurance and other safety net spending. In the long-run, expenditures related to healthcare programs such as Medicare and Medicaid are growing considerably faster than the economy overall as the population matures.

=== Warnings of a downgrade ===
On April 18, 2011, U.S.-based rating agency S&P issued a "negative" outlook on the U.S.'s "AAA" (highest quality) sovereign-debt rating for the first time since the rating agency began in 1860, indicating there was a one-in-three chance of an outright reduction in the rating over the next two years. S&P considered the government budget deficit of more than 11 percent of gross domestic product (GDP), and net government debt rising to about 80 percent or more of GDP by 2013, to be high relative to other "AAA" countries. According to S&P, meaningful progress towards balancing the budget would be required to move the U.S. back to a "stable" outlook. The S&P press release stated: "We believe there is a material risk that U.S. policymakers might not reach an agreement on how to address medium– and long-term budgetary challenges by 2013; if an agreement is not reached and meaningful implementation is not begun by then, this would, in our view, render the U.S. fiscal profile meaningfully weaker than that of peer 'AAA' sovereigns."

In June, Moody's followed suit, warning that if Congress did not quickly raise the debt ceiling above $14.3 trillion, the agency might reduce the debt rating. Moody's also commented on the political process, warning that the heightened polarization on both sides increased the risk of a default. On July 14, 2011, S&P issued a research update putting the U.S. debt on a 90-day CreditWatch.

On July 16, 2011, Egan-Jones Rating Company, a smaller CRA, cut its rating from AAA to AA+, the first NRSRO to do so.

=== S&P rationale for the downgrade ===
On August 5, 2011, representatives from S&P announced the company's decision to give its first-ever downgrade to U.S. sovereign debt, lowering the rating one notch to "AA+", with a negative outlook.

==== Governance and policy-making stability ====
S&P was direct in its criticism of the governance and policy-making process, which took the U.S. to the brink of default as part of the 2011 U.S. debt-ceiling crisis that same week:

- "More broadly, the downgrade reflects our view that the effectiveness, stability, and predictability of American policymaking and political institutions have weakened at a time of ongoing fiscal and economic challenges to a degree more than we envisioned when we assigned a negative outlook to the rating on April 18, 2011. Since then, we have changed our view of the difficulties in bridging the gulf between the political parties over fiscal policy, which makes us pessimistic about the capacity of Congress and the Administration to be able to leverage their agreement this week into a broader fiscal consolidation plan that stabilizes the government's debt dynamics any time soon."
- "The political brinksmanship of recent months highlights what we see as America's governance and policymaking becoming less stable, less effective, and less predictable than what we previously believed. The statutory debt ceiling and the threat of default have become political bargaining chips in the debate over fiscal policy. Despite this year's wide-ranging debate, in our view, the differences between political parties have proven to be extraordinarily difficult to bridge, and, as we see it, the resulting agreement fell well short of the comprehensive fiscal consolidation program that some proponents had envisaged until quite recently. Republicans and Democrats have only been able to agree to relatively modest savings on discretionary spending while delegating to the Select Committee decisions on more comprehensive measures. It appears that for now, new revenues have dropped down on the menu of policy options. In addition, the plan envisions only minor policy changes on Medicare and little change in other entitlements, the containment of which we and most other independent observers regard as key to long-term fiscal sustainability."

==== Revenues ====
S&P revised the revenue assumptions underlying one of their future debt-level projections:

- "Compared with previous projections, our revised base case scenario now assumes that the 2001 and 2003 tax cuts, due to expire by the end of 2012, remain in place. We have changed our assumption on this because the majority of Congress continue to resist any measure that would raise revenues, a position we believe Congress reinforced by passing the act."

==== Improving the rating ====
The report specifically refused to take a position on the blend of policy choices necessary to improve or maintain the credit rating:

- "Standard & Poor's takes no position on the mix of spending and revenue measures that Congress and the Administration might conclude is appropriate for putting the U.S.'s finances on a sustainable footing.

=== Criticism ===
Both Democratic and Republican politicians criticized S&P's decision, as well as placing blame with the other party. Few blamed themselves despite bi-partisan Congressional responsibility for passing budget deficits from 2002 onward and significant deficits for the 2012–2021 periods in U.S. President Barack Obama's 2012 federal budget.

==== From the Obama administration ====
Almost immediately after S&P announced the downgrade, first reported after 8 p.m. on a Friday night, Obama administration officials began to publicly criticize S&P's decision.

==== From Republican political figures ====
Republican strategists blamed Democratic intransigence for the rating agency's decision, and many Republican presidential candidates blamed the actions of Obama:

- Tim Pawlenty: Pawlenty pinned the blame on Obama, calling him "inept when it comes to creating the conditions or job creation and economic growth". He called for a new direction and president.
- Jon Huntsman: Huntsman blamed “out-of-control spending and a lack of leadership in Washington" noting that the country needs "new leadership in Washington committed to fiscal responsibility, a balanced budget, and job-friendly policies".
- Mitt Romney: Romney blamed Obama's failed "leadership on the economy". He noted that "the only way things will get better is with new leadership in the White House."
- Rep. Michele Bachmann: Bachmann noted that Obama "has destroyed the credit rating of the United States through his failed economic policies and his inability to control government spending by raising the debt ceiling". She called on Obama to seek the resignation of U.S. Treasury Secretary Timothy Geithner and "to submit a plan with list of cuts to balance the budget this year, turn our economy around and put Americans back to work."

==== From Democratic political figures ====
Democratic politicians placed the blame for the downgrade on Republicans or elements of the Republican Party.

- Senator John Kerry referred to this as the "Tea Party downgrade", blaming Republican intransigence regarding revenues and disregard for the consequences of a default.

==== From commentators ====
In addition to the Obama administration's criticism, several liberal commentators, among them billionaire Warren Buffett and Nobel Memorial Prize winner Paul Krugman, also criticized the downgrade. Filmmaker Michael Moore demanded Obama "show some guts" and have the head of Standard & Poor's arrested.

According to Mike Allen's Politico Playbook, "As a result of an error in constructing discretionary spending levels underlying the analysis, the deficit was $2 trillion higher over 10 years than the Congressional Budget Office would estimate. Treasury flagged the discrepancy to S&P, which admitted a mistake."

Commentators pointed out that a downgrade might result in an increase in interest rates required to finance U.S. debt, potentially raising interest costs.

An August 7, 2011, editorial by Bloomberg mentioned that several other countries downplayed the downgrade.

=== Market consequences ===
Global stock markets declined on August 8, 2011, following the announcement. All three major U.S. stock indexes declined between five and seven percent in one day. However, U.S. treasury bonds, which had been the subject of the downgrade, actually rose in price and the dollar gained in value against the Euro and the British pound, indicating a general flight to safe assets amid concerns about a European debt crisis.

However, based on historical information from Bloomberg, the cost to insure U.S. debts against default had risen from an average of around 25 basis points in 2007 to a range from 55 to 75 basis points in 2011. A higher cost of insurance is typically associated with increased risk of default.

== 2012 ==
Although none of the Big Three took any downgrade action in 2012, Egan-Jones downgraded twice further. After its initial rating cut on July 16, 2011, from AAA to AA+, Egan-Jones cut its rating a second time on April 5, 2012, from AA+ to AA "because of the lack of any tangible progress on addressing the problems and the continued rise in debt to GDP." On September 14, 2012, Egan-Jones cut its rating a third time from AA to AA−, the lowest of what is considered "high grade", as a reaction to QE3.

On December 19, 2012, the credit agency Fitch warned that it might cut the U.S. credit rating, citing fiscal cliff

== 2013 ==
On October 15, 2013, the credit agency Fitch warned that it might cut the U.S. credit rating, citing the political brinkmanship over raising the federal debt ceiling.

On October 17, 2013, Dagong Global Credit Rating downgraded the United States from A to A− and maintained a negative outlook on the country's credit.

== 2014 ==
On March 21, 2014, Fitch Ratings upgraded its outlook for the U.S. to a AAA credit rating, removing the nation from a downgrade watch after politicians put off another debt limit battle until the following year. The company, one of three major credit rating firms, changed the outlook for the rating to stable from a negative watch put in place in October.

== 2019 ==
In January 2019, Fitch Ratings warned that an extended 2018–19 United States federal government shutdown might lead to a downgrade in the U.S.'s Triple-A credit rating if lawmakers were unable to pass a budget or manage the debt ceiling. That in turn would make borrowing more costly for companies and American households, because it is the benchmark for many other lines of credit.

== 2020 ==
In July 2020, Fitch Ratings reaffirmed long-term foreign currency and local current default ratings at AAA but revised the outlook from stable to negative. Fitch noted that the US benefited from issuing debt in the world's reserve currency, but highlighted that the US government had the highest debt of any AAA-rated sovereign, and there was no credible fiscal consolidation plan in light of the economic shock caused by the Coronavirus disease 2019 pandemic. They predicted government debt to exceed 130% of GDP by 2021.

== 2023 ==
In response to the 2023 United States debt-ceiling crisis, Fitch placed its AAA rating on a negative watch on May 24, 2023, warning that "risks have risen that the debt limit will not be raised or suspended before the x-date and consequently that the government could begin to miss payments on some of its obligations." The agency cautioned that a default would downgrade affected securities to 'D', while other treasury bills could fall to 'CCC' or 'C'.

On August 1, 2023, Fitch downgraded the United States's long-term credit rating from AAA to AA+. Following the downgrade, economists argued that higher interest rates will result in higher mortgage rates and also assert that relying on foreign financing can have risky economic implications.

== 2025 ==
On May 16, 2025, Moody's downgraded the US debt rating from Aaa to Aa1.

On October 24, 2025, the European credit ratings agency Scope downgraded the US credit rating from AA to AA− citing "sustained deterioration in public finances and a weakening of governance standards."

== Potential consequences to credit rating agencies ==
Two weeks after the August 2011 S&P downgrade, the SEC and Department of Justice announced that S&P was under investigation. Columnist Bob Sullivan of NBC News asked if "the ratings downgrade from Standard & Poor’s [could] be viewed as a shot back at a government that's been taking plenty of shots at the ratings industry lately." Two years later in 2013, S&P "blasted a $5 billion fraud lawsuit by the U.S. government as retaliation for its 2011 decision to strip the country of its AAA credit rating."

Two weeks after the second downgrade by Egan-Jones in April 2012 to AA, the SEC voted to bring administrative action against the firm regarding years-old activity. Mr. Egan said at the time, "We are not going to be intimidated by anybody from issuing timely, accurate ratings." After Egan-Jones agreed to a settlement in 2013, the SEC director Robert Khuzami said in a press release, "EJR and Egan's misrepresentation of the firm's actual experience rating issuers of asset-backed and government securities is a serious violation that undercuts the integrity of the SEC's NRSRO registration process." In response, a Fox Business Network editor raised the question of "government retaliation" and an Egan-Jones spokesman issued a non-apology apology stating that the "SEC settlement lets us focus on what we do best—producing the most accurate and independent ratings in the business."

== See also ==
- 2011 United States debt-ceiling crisis
- 2013 United States debt-ceiling crisis
- 2023 United States debt-ceiling crisis
- National debt of the United States
