= 2013 United States debt-ceiling crisis =

In January 2013, the United States reached the $16.394 trillion debt ceiling that had been enacted following a crisis in 2011. The debt ceiling had been routinely raised previously on a bipartisan basis without conditions and without additional spending cuts. However, in 2013, members of the Republican Party staunchly opposed raising the debt ceiling unless Obama would agree to defund the Affordable Care Act (Obamacare), his signature legislative achievement.

The debt ceiling issue was one of the causes for the 2013 government shutdown, and a lack of a budget bill over the issue forced the government to sequester its budget. The crisis, as well as the government shutdown, ended on October 17, 2013, with the passing of the Continuing Appropriations Act, 2014.

== Background ==
After the passing in early January 2013 of the American Taxpayer Relief Act of 2012 to avert the projected fiscal cliff, political attention shifted to the debt ceiling. The debt ceiling had technically been reached on December 31, 2012, when the Treasury Department commenced "extraordinary measures" to enable the continued financing of the government.

The debt ceiling is part of a law (Title 31 of the United States Code, section 3101) created by Congress. According to the Government Accountability Office, "The debt limit does not control or limit the ability of the federal government to run deficits or incur obligations. Rather, it is a limit on the ability to pay obligations already incurred." It does not prohibit Congress from creating further obligations upon the United States. The ceiling was last set at $16.4 trillion in 2011.

On January 15, 2013, Fitch Ratings warned that delays in raising the debt ceiling could result in a formal review of its credit rating of the U.S., potentially leading to it being downgraded from AAA. Fitch cautioned that a downgrade could also result from the absence of a plan to bring down the deficit in the medium term. Additionally, the company stated that "In Fitch's opinion, the debt ceiling is an ineffective and potentially dangerous mechanism for enforcing fiscal discipline."

== Debate ==
In a press conference held on January 14, 2013, President Obama stated that not raising the debt ceiling would cause delays in payments including benefits and government employees' salaries and lead to default on government debt. President Obama urged Congress to raise the debt ceiling without conditions to avoid a default by the United States on government debt. Raising the debt ceiling was also supported by Ben Bernanke, chairman of the Federal Reserve.

Republican Speaker of the House, John Boehner and the Senate Republican minority leader, Mitch McConnell as well as other Republicans argued that the debt ceiling should not be raised unless spending is cut by an amount equal to or greater than the debt ceiling increase.

Republicans also argued that the Treasury can avoid debt default by prioritizing interest payments on government debt over other obligations. Heritage Action, Family Research Council, and Club for Growth argued that a rise in the debt ceiling should be accompanied by a plan to balance the budget within ten years, through reduced spending in the discretionary budget as well as for entitlements.

Several Democratic House members, including Peter Welch, proposed removing the debt ceiling altogether. This proposal found support from some economists such as Jacob Funk Kirkegaard, a senior fellow at the Peterson Institute for International Economics. A survey of 38 economists found that 84% agreed that a separate debt ceiling that is periodically increased could lead to uncertainty and poor fiscal outcomes.

== Debt ceiling suspension ==
In mid-January, Paul Ryan, Chairman of the House Budget Committee, floated the idea of a short-term debt ceiling increase. He argued that giving Treasury enough borrowing power to postpone default until mid-March would allow Republicans to gain an advantage over Obama and Democrats in debt ceiling negotiations. This advantage would be due to the fact that postponing default until mid-March would allow for a triple deadline to be in March: the sequester on March 1, the default in the middle of the month, and the expiration of the current continuing resolution and the resulting federal government shutdown on March 27. This was supposed to provide extra pressure on the Senate and the President to work out a deal with the Republican-led House.

Shortly after that, the House learned that the Senate had not passed an independent budget plan since April 2009. House Republicans quickly came up with an idea that would suspend the debt ceiling enough to allow time for both chambers of Congress to pass a budget.

On February 4, 2013, President Obama signed into law the "No Budget, No Pay Act of 2013", which suspended the U.S. debt ceiling through May 18, 2013. The bill was passed in the Senate one week previously by a vote of 64–34, with all "no" votes from Republican senators, who were critical of the lack of spending cuts that accompanied an increase in the limit. In the House, the bill passed the week before by a vote of 285–144, with both parties voting in favor. In the House, Republican representatives attached a provision to mandate the temporary withholding of pay to members of Congress if they did not produce a budget plan by April 15. Pay would be reinstated once a budget was passed or on January 2, 2015 (the last day of the 113th Congress), whichever came first. Under the law, the debt ceiling would be set on May 19, 2013, to a level "necessary to fund commitment incurred by the Federal Government that required payment."

=== Developments during suspension ===
On March 1, the sequester, cutting $1.2 trillion over the next decade, went into effect after the parties failed to reach a deal. On March 21, the House passed a FY 2014 budget that would balance the United States budget in 2023. This was a shorter period than envisaged in their 2013 budget, which balanced in 2035, and the 2012 budget, which balanced in 2063. It passed the House on a mostly party-line 221–207 vote. However, later that day, the Senate voted 59–40 to reject the House Republican budget. On March 23, the Senate passed its own 2014 budget on a 50–49 vote. The House refused to hold a vote on the Senate budget. On April 10, the President released his own 2014 budget, which was not voted on in either house of Congress. Throughout March and April, there were several developments that reduced the sequester's impact. The bill that extended the government's continuing resolution to September 30 lessened the sequester's effect on defense, and later bills removed furloughs for air traffic control and food service industries.

=== Debt ceiling reached again ===
On May 19, the debt ceiling was reinstated at just under $16.7 trillion to reflect borrowing during the suspension period. As there was no provision made for further commitments after the ceiling's reinstatement, Treasury began applying extraordinary measures once again.

Despite earlier estimates of late July, Treasury announced that default would not happen "until sometime after Labor Day". Other organizations, including the Congressional Budget Office (CBO), projected exhaustion of the extraordinary measures in October or possibly November.

On August 26, 2013, Treasury informed Congress that if the debt ceiling was not raised in time, the United States would be forced to default on its debt sometime in mid-October.

On September 25, Treasury announced that extraordinary measures would be exhausted no later than October 17, leaving Treasury with about $30 billion in cash, plus incoming revenue, but no ability to borrow money. The CBO estimated that the exact date on which Treasury would have had to begin prioritizing/delaying bills and/or actually defaulting on some obligations would fall between October 22 and November 1.

== October 2013 debt ceiling debate ==
Obama and Republicans disagreed on the terms of raising the nation's debt limit, and even as to whether the debt limit should even be a subject of negotiation.

House Republicans described a number of policies they wanted to enact before they would agree to increasing the debt ceiling beyond October 2013:

- Long term debt ceiling increase (allowing Treasury to borrow for the rest of Obama's term): privatize Medicare and/or Social Security.
- Medium term debt ceiling increase (allowing Treasury to borrow until sometime in 2015): cut food stamps, use the chained consumer price index (CPI), tax reform, agree to enact block-grant Medicaid or a large raise in the retirement age.
- Short term debt ceiling increase (postponing default until sometime in the first half of 2014): means testing of Social Security, a small raise in the retirement age or ending agricultural subsidies.

Obama, in turn, asserted that the 2013 sequestration cuts already represented a budget compromise, and that he did not intend to negotiate further on the issue of debt repayment. However, the president said that he would be willing to negotiate on almost any issue after a clean bill to reopen the government and increase the debt ceiling had been passed.

In September 2013 the House of Representatives drafted a bill that would postpone default for approximately twelve months from its passage. The bill also included a one-year delay in implementation of the Patient Protection and Affordable Care Act, a requirement for both houses of Congress to vote on tax reform plans by the end of 2013, and a fast-track process to begin construction of the Keystone XL Pipeline. However, the bill was not voted on by the House or Senate due to some members of the House Republican caucus believing that the bill did not make deep enough spending cuts to be worthy of Republican support.

The US Government went into a partial shutdown on October 1, 2013, with about 800,000 Federal employees being put on temporary leave. Treasury Secretary Jack Lew reiterated that the debt ceiling would need to be raised by October 17.

In early October 2013, the House drafted a bill that would raise the debt ceiling without conditions through November 22, but keep the partial government shutdown in place. However, it died due to insufficient support among both House Republicans and House Democrats.

== Resolution ==
On October 16, the Senate passed the Continuing Appropriations Act, 2014, a continuing resolution, to fund the government until January 15, 2014, and suspending the debt ceiling until February 7, 2014, thus ending the 2013 United States federal government shutdown and debt-ceiling crisis.

It set up a House–Senate budget conference to negotiate a long-term spending agreement, and strengthened income verification for subsidies under the Patient Protection and Affordable Care Act. The Senate vote was 81–18 in favor, with 1 member absent due to illness. The House passed the bill unamended later that day, by a vote of 285–144, with 3 members absent due to illness. The President signed the bill early the next morning on October 17. Under the resolution, the debt ceiling debate and partial government shutdown were postponed, with federal workers returning to work on October 17.

On January 14, 2014, the House and the Senate Appropriations Committees agreed on a spending plan that would fund the federal government for two years. A bill extending the previous continuing resolution through January 18 was also passed. On January 16, 2014, Congress passed a $1.1 trillion appropriations bill that will keep the federal government funded until October 2014. President Obama signed the appropriations bill into law on January 18.

On February 7, 2014, the debt limit suspension expired and treasury began applying extraordinary measures once again, warning that such measures would not last beyond February 27 due to large tax refunds that would need to be paid during February. On February 11, after finding insufficient support for various conditions for increasing the debt ceiling, the House passed a bill suspending the debt ceiling without conditions through March 15, 2015. The Senate passed the bill unamended on February 12, 2014, and it was signed into law as Public Law 113-83 by the President on February 15.

== Reaction ==
=== Effect on United States debt rating ===
Just as during the 2011 debt ceiling crisis, the 2013 crisis caused rating agencies to re-evaluate the rating of US government debt. On October 15, Fitch Ratings placed the United States under a "Rating watch negative" in response to the crisis. On October 17, Dagong Global Credit Rating downgraded the United States from A to A−, and maintained a negative outlook on the country's credit.

=== Effect on the U.S. Stock Market ===
According to a Morningstar analysis of debt-ceiling and government shutdown situations, the U.S. stock market remained relatively unchanged during the 2013 crisis period.

=== Political aftermath ===
In the immediate aftermath of the crisis opinion polls showed approval to drop for the Republican Party. Polls showed that Americans blamed the Republicans more for the shutdown than President Barack Obama by a margin of 22 points (53 percent to 31 percent). Another poll showed a 74% disapproval rating of the way Republicans handled the crisis while 61% disapproved of the way Democrats handled the budget talks. According to a Gallup Poll, "60 percent of respondents said that a third major party is needed to represent the American people", an all-time high.

== See also ==
- Budget Control Act of 2011
- European sovereign debt crisis
- History of United States debt ceiling
- 2008 financial crisis
- United States Congress Joint Select Committee on Deficit Reduction
- United States federal government credit-rating downgrades
- 2011 United States debt-ceiling crisis
- 2023 United States debt-ceiling crisis
- 2013 United States federal government shutdown
- 1995–1996 United States federal government shutdowns
