= Dagong Europe Credit Rating =

Credit rating agency

- Company type: State-owned enterprise
- Industry: Financial services
- Founded: 2012; 14 years ago
- Headquarters: Milan, Italy
- Website: Official website

Dagong Europe Credit Rating is no longer a subsidiary of Dagong Global Credit Rating since 2019. It then changed name to DG International Ratings SRL. The European Securities and Markets Authority(ESMA) has withdrawn the credit rating agency (CRA)registration of DG International Ratings SRL(previously Dagong Europe Credit Rating Srl)(DG International).

== History ==
It was established in March 2012 with headquarters in Milan, Italy. In June 2013, it was registered and received authorization from the European Securities and Markets Authority ('ESMA') under the Article 16 of the Credit Rating Agency (CRA) regulation. It is the first entity to have applied for registration as a CRA with shareholders from the People's Republic of China. It is recognized by the Joint Committee of the three European Supervisory Authorities (EBA, ESMA and EIOPA – ESAs) as External Credit Assessment Institutions (ECAI) operating in the European Union. In December 2016, Dagong Europe opened its branch office in Frankfurt, Germany.

Dagong Europe is solely owned by its parent company, Dagong Global Credit Rating. The parent company stated that it has used "dialectical materialism" as part of its evaluative approach. In 2018, the parent company's operations were suspended following accusations of corruption and doctored ratings in exchange for fees. In 2019, the parent company was nationalized.
