= Temporary Debt Limit Extension Act =

- Announced in: the 113th United States Congress
- Sponsored by: Sen. Jeanne Shaheen (D, NH)
- Number of co-sponsors: 1

Legislative history
- Introduced in the Senate as S. 540 by Sen. Jeanne Shaheen (D, NH) on March 12, 2013; Committee consideration by United States Senate Committee on Commerce, Science and Transportation; Passed the Senate on March 21, 2013 (unanimous consent); Passed the House as the Temporary Debt Limit Extension Act on February 11, 2014 (Roll Call Vote 61: 221-201) with amendment; Senate agreed to House amendment on February 12, 2014 (Senate Vote 34: 55-43)

The Temporary Debt Limit Extension Act (S. 540) is a bill that would suspend the United States debt ceiling until March 15, 2015. There would be no statutory limit on the amount of money the government is allowed to borrow between now and then. The current cap on borrowing is $17.2 trillion.

It passed in the House and Senate during the 113th United States Congress.

== Provisions of the bill ==
This summary is based largely on the summary provided by the Congressional Research Service, a public domain source.

The Temporary Debt Limit Extension Act would suspend the public debt limit for the period beginning on the date of enactment of this Act and ending on March 15, 2015.

The bill would increase the debt limit, effective March 16, 2015, to the extent that:

(1) the face amount of such obligations outstanding on the date of enactment of this Act is exceeded by
(2) the total of the face amount of public debt obligations and the face amount of obligations whose principal and interest are guaranteed by the U.S. government (except guaranteed obligations held by the Secretary of the Treasury) outstanding on March 16, 2015.

The bill would exclude an obligation under clause 2 (above) from being taken into account unless its issuance was necessary to fund a commitment incurred pursuant to law that required payment before March 16, 2015.

The bill would prohibit the Secretary of the Treasury from issuing obligations during the period beginning on the date of enactment of this Act and ending on March 15, 2015, for the purpose of increasing the cash balance above normal operating balances in anticipation of the expiration of such period.

== Congressional Budget Office report ==
This summary is based largely on the summary provided by the Congressional Budget Office, as posted on the website of the Committee on Rules on February 10, 2014 (Committee Print 113-37). This is a public domain source.

Upon enactment, S. 540 would suspend the current debt limit through March 15, 2015. On the following day, the debt ceiling would be raised by the amount of obligations incurred up to that point.

The legislation also would extend across-the-board cuts (known as sequestration) in certain direct spending programs for an additional year beyond 2023—the last year for which sequestration will apply under current law. The Congressional Budget Office (CBO) estimates that those provisions would reduce direct spending by about $9.2 billion in fiscal year 2024.

Section 5 would revise section 403 of the Bipartisan Budget Act of 2013 (Pub. L. 113–67 (text) (PDF)), as modified by the Consolidated Appropriations Act, 2014, which reduced the annual cost-of-living adjustment for annuities paid to certain military retirees and survivors by up to one percent. Section 5 would apply the changes from P.L. 113-67 only to those who first became members of the uniformed services after January 1, 2014, and would increase direct spending by about $6.8 billion over the 2014-2024 period, CBO estimates.

Section 6 would create a fund to be used by the Secretary of Health and Human Services to pay for physicians’ services under Part B of Medicare. CBO estimates that provision would increase direct spending by about $2.4 billion, with that effect falling in fiscal years 2017 and 2018.

On balance, enacting S. 540 would reduce direct spending by a total of $34 million over the 2014-2024 period, by CBO's estimation.

The legislation would have additional effects after 2024 because the repeal of section 403 of P.L. 113-67 would continue to have costs in all subsequent years. The additional year of sequestration under section 6 would partially offset those costs by yielding several billion dollars of budgetary savings in fiscal year 2025. In combination, those effects would increase direct spending, CBO estimates, by more than $5 billion in at least one of the four consecutive 10-year periods beginning in 2024.

== Procedural history ==
The Temporary Debt Limit Extension Act was originally introduced into the United States Senate on March 12, 2013 by Sen. Jeanne Shaheen (D, NH) under a different name and contents. The original text of the bill was about renaming an air route traffic control center after one of its long-time employees, but the bill became unnecessary when the House-sponsored version of the bill was signed into law. Nearly a year later, the United States House of Representatives used the bill as a vehicle to quickly pass a debt ceiling increase. The House changed the name to the Temporary Debt Limit Extension Act on February 11, 2014, and passed it in Roll Call Vote 61 by a vote of 221-201. The Senate passed the amended bill the next day in Senate Vote 34 with a vote of 55-43.

== Debate and discussion ==
The bill had the support of both the House and the Senate Democratic leadership and President Barack Obama. Only 28 Republicans voted in favor of the bill in the House with 199 Republicans voting against the bill. The bill passed in the House primarily due to support from the Democrats.

Conservative organization Heritage Action announced its opposition of the bill and called on Senators to vote against it. According to Heritage Action, while the limit is suspended, "President Obama and Congress will have a blank check to spend and borrow. This is extremely reckless given our nation’s $17.3 trillion debt. Every American household already owes more than $140,000 on the debt."

The National Taxpayers Union (NTU) also opposed the bill. The group criticised politicians from both parties saying, "this year, as the limit approached, most Democrats refused to discuss the debt problem at all. Republicans opted to stress important, though mostly unrelated policy goals, thus failing to focus on the key issue at hand." NTU expressed the opinion that spending reforms should be dealt with, instead of just increasing the debt limit.

== See also ==
- List of bills in the 113th United States Congress
- United States debt ceiling
