= 2011 United States debt-ceiling crisis =

In 2011, ongoing political debate in the United States Congress about the appropriate level of government spending and its effect on the national debt and deficit reached a crisis centered on raising the debt ceiling, leading to the passage of the Budget Control Act of 2011.

The Republican Party, which gained control of the House of Representatives in January 2011, demanded that President Obama negotiate over deficit reduction in exchange for an increase in the debt ceiling, the statutory maximum of money the Treasury is allowed to borrow. The debt ceiling had routinely been raised in the past without partisan debate or additional terms or conditions. This reflects the fact that the debt ceiling does not prescribe the amount of spending, but only ensures that the government can pay for the spending to which it has already committed itself. Some use the analogy of an individual "paying their bills."

If the United States breached its debt ceiling and were unable to resort to other "extraordinary measures", the Treasury would have to either default on payments to bondholders or immediately curtail payment of funds owed to various companies and individuals that had been mandated but not fully funded by Congress. Both situations would likely have led to a significant international financial crisis.

On July 31, two days prior to when the Treasury estimated the borrowing authority of the United States would be exhausted, Republicans agreed to raise the debt ceiling in exchange for a complex deal of significant future spending cuts. The crisis did not permanently resolve the potential of future use of the debt ceiling in budgetary disputes, as shown by the subsequent crisis in 2013.

The crisis sparked the most volatile week for financial markets since the 2008 financial crisis, with the stock market trending significantly downward. Prices of government bonds ("Treasuries") rose as investors, anxious over the dismal prospects of the US economic future and the ongoing European sovereign-debt crisis, fled into the still-perceived relative safety of US government bonds. Later that week, the credit-rating agency Standard & Poor's downgraded the credit rating of the United States government for the first time in the country's history, though the other two major credit-rating agencies, Moody's and Fitch, retained America's credit rating at AAA. The Government Accountability Office (GAO) estimated that the delay in raising the debt ceiling increased government borrowing costs by $1.3 billion in 2011 and also pointed to unestimated higher costs in later years. The Bipartisan Policy Center extended the GAO's estimates and found that delays in raising the debt ceiling would raise borrowing costs by $18.9 billion.

== Context ==
Under US law, an administration can spend only if it has sufficient funds to pay for it. These funds can come either from tax receipts or from borrowing by the United States Department of the Treasury. Congress has set a debt ceiling, beyond which the Treasury cannot borrow (this is similar to a credit limit on a credit card). The debt limit does not restrict Congress's ability to enact spending and revenue legislation that affects the level of debt or otherwise constrains fiscal policy; it restricts Treasury's authority to borrow to finance the decisions already enacted by Congress and the President. Congress also usually votes on increasing the debt limit after fiscal policy decisions affecting federal borrowing have begun to take effect. In the absence of sufficient revenue, a failure to raise the debt ceiling would result in the administration being unable to fund all the spending which it is required to do by prior acts of Congress. At that point, the government must cancel or delay some spending, a situation sometimes referred to as a partial government shut down.

In addition, the Obama administration stated that, without this increase, the US would enter sovereign default (failure to pay the interest and/or principal of US treasury securities on time) thereby creating an international crisis in the financial markets. Alternatively, default could be averted if the government were to promptly reduce its other spending by about half.

An increase in the debt ceiling requires the approval of both houses of Congress. Republicans and some Democrats insisted that an increase in the debt ceiling be coupled with a plan to reduce the growth in debt. There were differences as to how to reduce the expected increase in the debt. Initially, nearly all Republican legislators (who held a majority in the House of Representatives) opposed any increase in taxes and proposed large spending cuts. A large majority of Democratic legislators (who held a majority in the Senate) favored tax increases along with smaller spending cuts. Supporters of the Tea Party movement pushed their fellow Republicans to reject any agreement that failed to incorporate large and immediate spending cuts or a constitutional amendment requiring a balanced budget.

== Background ==
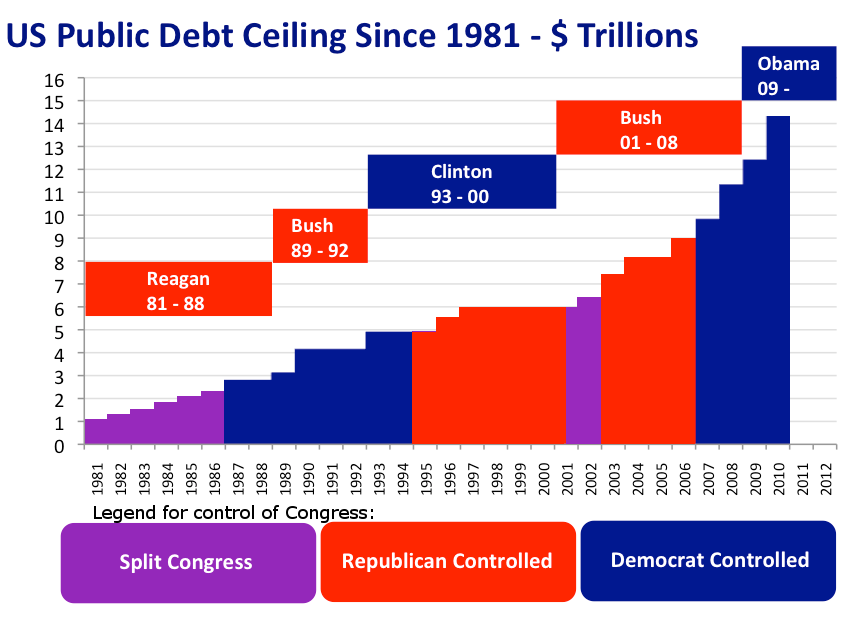
US debt ceiling at the end of each year from 1981 to 2010. The graph indicates which president and which political party controlled Congress each year.

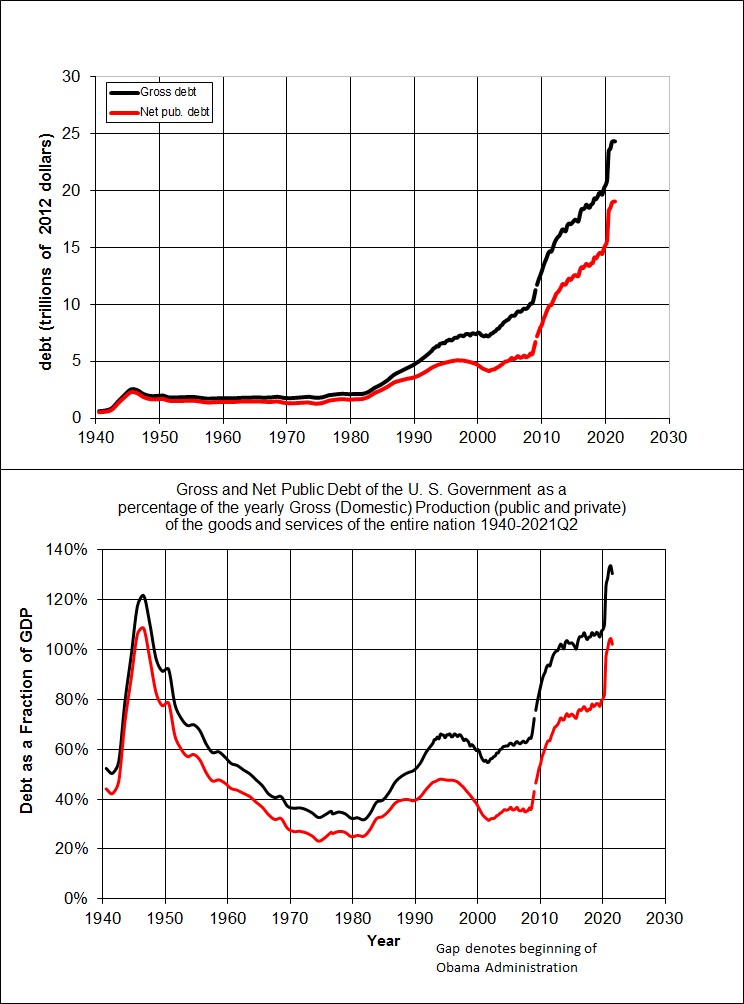
US debt from 1940 to 2010. Red lines indicate the Debt Held by the Public (net public debt) and black lines indicate the Total Public Debt Outstanding (gross public debt). The difference between the two is the debt that is held by the federal government itself. The second panel shows the two debt figures as a percentage of US GDP (dollar value of US economic production for that year). The top panel is deflated so every year is in 2010 dollars.

=== Debt ceiling ===
In the United States, the federal government can pay for expenditures only if Congress has approved the expenditure in an appropriation bill. If the proposed expenditure exceeds the revenues that have been collected, there is a deficit or shortfall, which can only be financed by the government, through the Department of the Treasury, borrowing the shortfall amount by the issue of debt instruments. Under federal law, the amount that the government can borrow is limited by the debt ceiling, which can only be increased with a separate vote by Congress.

Prior to 1917, Congress directly authorized the amount of each borrowing. In 1917, in order to provide more flexibility to finance the US involvement in World War I, Congress instituted the concept of a "debt ceiling". Since then, the Treasury may borrow any amount needed as long as it keeps the total at or below the authorized ceiling. Some small special classes of debt are not included in this total. To change the debt ceiling, Congress must enact specific legislation, and the President must sign it into law.

The process of setting the debt ceiling is separate and distinct from the regular process of financing government operations, and raising the debt ceiling does not have any direct impact on the budget deficit. The US government passes a federal budget every year. This budget details projected tax collections and outlays and, therefore, the amount of borrowing the government would have to do in that fiscal year. A vote to increase the debt ceiling is, therefore, usually seen as a formality, needed to continue spending that has already been approved previously by the Congress and the President. The Government Accountability Office explains: "The debt limit does not control or limit the ability of the federal government to run deficits or incur obligations. Rather, it is a limit on the ability to pay obligations already incurred." The apparent redundancy of the debt ceiling has led to suggestions that it should be abolished altogether. From 1979 to 1995, the House of Representatives followed the "Gephardt Rule" which deemed the debt ceiling raised if necessary to cover appropriations.

The US has had public debt since its inception. Debts incurred during the American Revolutionary War and under the Articles of Confederation led to the first yearly report on the amount of the debt ($75,463,476.52 on January 1, 1791). Every president since Harry Truman has added to the national debt. The debt ceiling has been raised 74 times since March 1962, including 18 times under Ronald Reagan, eight times under Bill Clinton, seven times under George W. Bush and three times (as of August 2011) under Barack Obama.

As of May 2011, approximately 40 percent of US government spending relied on borrowed money. That is, without borrowing, the federal government would have had to cut spending immediately by 40 percent, affecting many daily operations of the government, besides the impact on the domestic and international economies. It is unclear if the Treasury has the technological capability to disburse funds to some individuals it owes money. The Government Accountability Office reported in February 2011 that managing debt when delays in raising the debt limit occur diverts Treasury's resources from other cash and debt management responsibilities and that Treasury's borrowing costs modestly increased during debt limit debates in 2002, 2003, 2010 and 2011. If the interest payments on the national debt are not made, the US would be in default, potentially causing catastrophic economic consequences for the US and the wider world as well. (Effects outside the US would be likely because the United States is a major trading partner with many countries. Other major world powers that hold US government debt could demand immediate repayment.)

According to the Treasury, "failing to increase the debt limit would . . . cause the government to default on its legal obligations – an unprecedented event in American history". These legal obligations include paying Social Security and Medicare benefits, military salaries, interest on the debt, and many other items. Making the promised payments of the principal and interest of US treasury securities on time ensures that the nation does not default on its sovereign debt.

Critics have argued that the debt ceiling crisis is "self-inflicted," as treasury bond interest rates were at historical lows, and the US had no market restrictions on its ability to obtain additional credit. The debt ceiling has been raised 68 times since 1960. Sometimes the increase was treated as routine; many times it was used to score political points for the minority party by criticizing the out-of-control spending of the majority. The only other country with a debt limit is Denmark, which has set its debt ceiling so high that it is unlikely to be reached. If raising the limit ceases to be routine, this may create uncertainty for global markets each time a debt ceiling increase is debated. The 2011 debt-ceiling crisis has shown how a party in control of only one chamber of Congress (in this case, Republicans in control of the House of Representatives but not the Senate or the Presidency) can have significant influence if it chooses to block the routine raising of the debt limit.

=== Concern about budget deficits and long-term debt ===
Underlying the contentious debate over raising the debt ceiling has been an anxiety, growing since 2008, about the large United States federal budget deficits and the increasing federal debt. According to the Congressional Budget Office (CBO): "At the end of 2008, that debt equaled 40 percent of the nation's annual economic output (a little above the 40-year average of 37 percent). Since then, the figure has shot upward: By the end of fiscal year 2011, the Congressional Budget Office (CBO) projects federal debt will reach roughly 70 percent of gross domestic product (GDP) — the highest percentage since shortly after World War II." The sharp rise in debt after 2008 stems largely from lower tax revenues and higher federal spending related to the severe recession and persistently high unemployment in 2008–11. Though a balanced budget is ideal, allowing down payment on debt and more flexibility within government budgeting, limiting deficits to within 1% to 2% of GDP is sufficient to stabilize the debt. Deficits in 2009 and 2010 were 10.0 percent and 8.9 percent respectively, and the largest as a share of gross domestic product since 1945.

In 2009, the Tea Party movement emerged with a focus on reducing government spending and regulation. The Tea Party movement helped usher in a wave of new Republican office-holders in the 2010 mid-term elections whose major planks during the campaign included cutting federal spending and stopping any tax increases. These new Republicans and the new Republican House majority greatly affected the 2011 debt ceiling political debate.

In early 2010, President Obama established the Bowles-Simpson Commission to propose recommendations to balance the budget by 2015. The commission issued a report in December 2010, but the recommendations failed to receive enough votes to allow the report to be passed on to Congress.

Throughout 2011, Standard & Poor's and Moody's credit rating services issued warnings that US credit rating could be downgraded because of the continued large deficits and increasing debt. According to the CBO's 2011 long-term budget outlook, without major policy changes the large budget deficits and growing debt would continue, which "would reduce national saving, leading to higher interest rates, more borrowing from abroad, and less domestic investment – which in turn would lower income growth in the United States". The European sovereign debt crisis was occurring throughout 2010–2011, and there were concerns that the US was on the same trajectory.

=== Negative real interest rates ===
Since 2010, the U.S. Treasury has been obtaining negative real interest rates on government debt. Such low rates, outpaced by the inflation rate, occur when the market believes that there are no alternatives with sufficiently low risk, or when popular institutional investments such as insurance companies, pensions, or bond, money market, and balanced mutual funds are required or choose to invest sufficiently large sums in Treasury securities to hedge against risk. Lawrence Summers and other economists state that at such low rates, government debt borrowing saves taxpayer money, and improves creditworthiness. In the late 1940s and then again in the early 1970s, the US and UK both reduced their debt burden by about 30% to 40% of GDP per decade by taking advantage of negative real interest rates, but there is no guarantee that government debt rates will continue to stay so low. In January 2012, the U.S. Treasury Borrowing Advisory Committee of the Securities Industry and Financial Markets Association unanimously recommended that government debt be allowed to auction even lower, at negative absolute interest rates.

This method of negative real interest rates has been claimed to be a form of financial repression by governments as it is "a transfer from creditors (savers) to borrowers (in the historical episode under study here—the government)" and "given that deficit reduction usually involves highly unpopular expenditure reductions and (or) tax increases of one form or another, the relatively 'stealthier' financial repression tax may be a more politically palatable alternative to authorities faced with the need to reduce outstanding debts".

== Resort to extraordinary measures ==
Prior to the 2011 debt ceiling crisis, the debt ceiling was last raised on February 12, 2010 to $14.294 trillion.

On April 15, 2011, Congress passed the last part of the 2011 United States federal budget in the beginning 2012, authorizing federal government spending for the remainder of the 2011 fiscal year, which ended on September 30, 2011. For the 2011 fiscal year, expenditure was estimated at $3.82 trillion, with expected revenues of $2.17 trillion, leaving a deficit of $1.48 trillion. This includes, public and federal debt, as well as the GDP. Leaving a budget deficit of 38.7%, the world's highest.

However, soon after the 2011 budget was passed, the debt ceiling set in February 2010 was reached. In a letter to Congress of April 4, 2011, Treasury Secretary Timothy Geithner explained that when the debt ceiling is reached, the US Treasury can declare a debt issuance suspension period and utilize "extraordinary measures" to acquire funds to meet federal obligations but which do not require the issue of new debt, such as the sale of assets from the Civil Service Retirement and Disability Fund and the G Fund of the Thrift Savings Plan. These measures were implemented on May 16, 2011, when Geithner declared a "debt issuance suspension period". According to his letter to Congress, this period could "last until August 2, 2011, when the Department of the Treasury projects that the borrowing authority of the United States will be exhausted". These methods have been used on several previous occasions in which federal debt neared its statutory limit.

=== The August 2, 2011 deadline ===
The U.S. Treasury stated on multiple occasions that the US government would exhaust its borrowing authority around August 2, 2011. That date appeared to serve as an effective deadline for Congress to vote to increase the debt ceiling.

While the U.S. Treasury's borrowing authority may have been exhausted on August 2, 2011, it retained cash balances that would have enabled it to meet federal obligations for a short time. According to Barclays Capital, Treasury would run out of cash around August 10, when $8.5 billion in Social Security payments were due. According to Wall Street analysts, Treasury would not be able borrow from the capital markets after August 2, but still would have enough incoming cash to meet its obligations until August 15. Analysts also predicted that Treasury would be able to roll over the $90 billion in US debt that matured on August 4, and gain additional time to avert the crisis.

Projections required for debt and cash management can be volatile. Outside experts that track Treasury finances had said that announced Treasury estimates were within the range of uncertainty for their analyses. Delaying an increase in the debt limit past August 2 could have risked a delay in Social Security and other benefit checks, and could have led to disruptions in scheduled Treasury auctions.

== Implications of not raising the debt ceiling ==
Experts were divided on how bad the effects of not raising the debt ceiling for a short period would be on the economy. While some leading economists, including Republican adviser Douglas Holtz-Eakin, suggested even a brief failure to meet US obligations could have devastating long-term consequences, others argued that the market would write it off as a Congressional dispute and return to normal once the immediate crisis was resolved. Some argued that the worst outcome would be if the US failed to pay interest and/or principal on the national debt to bondholders, thereby defaulting on its sovereign debt. Former Treasury Secretary Lawrence Summers warned in July 2011 that the consequences of such a default would be higher borrowing costs for the US government (as much as one percent or $150 billion/year in additional interest costs) and the equivalent of bank runs on the money markets and other financial markets, potentially as severe as those of September 2008.

In January 2011 Treasury Secretary Timothy Geithner warned that "failure to raise the limit would precipitate a default by the United States. Default would effectively impose a significant and long-lasting tax on all Americans and all American businesses and could lead to the loss of millions of American jobs. Even a very short-term or limited default would have catastrophic economic consequences that would last for decades."

Senators Pat Toomey and Jim DeMint expressed deep concern that administration officials were stating or implying that failure to raise the nation's debt limit would constitute a default on US debt and precipitate a financial crisis: "We believe it is irresponsible and harmful for you to sow the seeds of doubt in the market regarding the full faith and credit of the United States and ask that you set the record straight – that you will use all available Treasury funds necessary to prevent default while Congress addresses the looming debt crisis."

Geithner responded that prioritizing debt would require "cutting roughly 40 percent of all government payments", which could only be achieved by "selectively defaulting on obligations previously approved by Congress". He argued that this would harm the reputation of the United States so severely that there is "no guarantee that investors would continue to re-invest in new Treasury securities", forcing the government to repay the principal on existing debt as it matured, which it would be unable to do under any conceivable circumstance. He concluded: "There is no alternative to enactment of a timely increase in the debt limit." On January 25, 2011, Senator Toomey introduced The Full Faith And Credit Act bill [S.163] that would require the Treasury to prioritize payments to service the national debt over other obligations. (The bill was cleared by its committee for consideration the next day and added to the Senate "calendar of business", but no further action had occurred by mid-August 2011.)

Even if the Treasury were to prioritize payments on the debt above other spending and avoid formal default on its bonds, failure to raise the debt ceiling would force the government to reduce its spending by as much as ten percent of GDP overnight, leading to a corresponding fall in aggregate demand. Economists believe that such a significant shock, if sustained, would reverse the economic recovery and send the country into a recession.

== Proposed resolutions ==
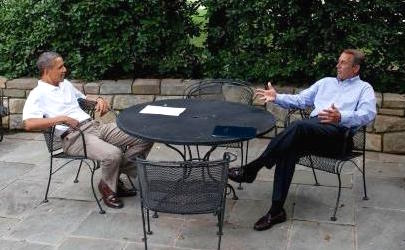
President Barack Obama met with Speaker of the House John Boehner on the patio near the Oval Office on Sunday, July 3, 2011, during the debt ceiling increase negotiations.

Congress considered whether and by how much to extend the debt ceiling (or eliminate it), and what long-term policy changes (if any) should be made concurrently.

The Republican positions on raising the debt ceiling included:

- A Dollar-for-dollar deal; that is, raise the debt ceiling to match corresponding spending cuts
- More of the budget cuts in the first two years
- Spending caps
- A Balanced Budget Amendment – to pass Congress and be sent to states for ratification
- No tax increases but tax reform could be considered

(One representative, Ron Paul, proposed transferring $1.6 trillion of Federal Reserve assets to the government and destroying those bonds, thereby reducing the United States gross federal debt by the same amount This would violate the property rights of national banks who own the Federal Reserve Banks.)

The Democratic positions on raising the debt ceiling included:

- Initially, a "clean" increase or unconditional raise to the debt ceiling with no spending cuts attached
- Spending cuts combined with tax increases on some categories of taxpayers, to reduce deficits (For example, a 1:1 spending cut / tax increase ratio initially desired in the Congress versus 3:1 offered by President Obama.)
- A large debt-ceiling increase, to support borrowing into 2013 (after the next election)
- Opposed to any major cuts to Social Security, Medicare, or Medicaid

(Some Democratic lawmakers suggested that the President could declare that the debt ceiling violates the US Constitution and issue an Executive Order to direct the Treasury to issue more debt.)

The US House of Representatives originally refused to raise the debt ceiling without deficit reduction, voting down a "clean" bill to increase the debt ceiling without conditions. The May 31 vote was 318 to 97, with all 236 Republicans and 82 Democrats voting to defeat the bill. The Republicans largely believed a deficit reduction deal should be based solely on spending cuts, including cuts to entitlements, without any tax increases, to reduce or solve the long-term issue of debt. Obama and the Democrats in the US Congress wanted an increase in the debt ceiling to solve the short-term borrowing problem, and in exchange supported a decrease in the budget deficit, to be funded by a combination of spending cuts and revenue increases. Some prominent liberal economists, such as Paul Krugman, Larry Summers, and Brad DeLong, and prominent investors such as Bill Gross, went even further, and argued that not only should the debt ceiling be raised, but federal spending (and, therefore, the deficit) should be increased in the short term (as long as the economy remains in the liquidity trap), which they believed would stimulate the economy, reduce unemployment, and ultimately reduce the deficit in the medium to long term.

Some Tea Party Caucus and other Republicans, however, (including, but not limited to, Senators Jim DeMint, Rand Paul, and Mike Lee, and Representatives Michele Bachmann, Ron Paul, and Allen West) expressed skepticism about raising the debt ceiling (with some suggesting the consequences of default are exaggerated), arguing that the debt ceiling should not be raised, and "instead the federal debt [should] be 'capped' at the current limit," "although that would oblige the government to cut spending by almost half overnight."

Jack Balkin, the Knight Professor of Constitutional Law and the First Amendment at Yale Law School, suggested two other ways to solve the debt ceiling crisis: he pointed out that the US Treasury has the power to issue platinum coins in any denomination, so it could solve the debt ceiling crisis by simply issuing two platinum coins in denominations of $1 trillion each, depositing them into its account in the Federal Reserve, and writing checks on the proceeds. Another way to solve the debt ceiling crisis, Balkin suggested, would be for the federal government to sell the Federal Reserve an option to purchase government property for $2 trillion. The Federal Reserve would then credit the proceeds to the government's checking account. Once Congress lifted the debt ceiling, the president could buy back the option for a dollar, or the option could simply expire in 90 days.

In a report issued by the credit rating agency Moody's, analyst Steven Hess suggested that the government should consider getting rid of the limit altogether, because the difficulty inherent in reaching an agreement to raise the debt ceiling "creates a high level of uncertainty" and an increased risk of default. As reported by The Washington Post, "without a limit dependent on congressional approval, the report said, the agency would worry less about the government's ability to meet its debt obligations." Other public figures, including Democratic ex-President Bill Clinton and Republican ex-CBO director Douglas Holtz-Eakin, have suggested eliminating the debt ceiling.

=== Possible methods of bypassing the debt ceiling ===
==== Fourteenth Amendment ====
During the debate, some scholars, Democratic lawmakers, and Treasury Secretary Tim Geithner suggested that the President could declare that the debt ceiling violates the Constitution and issue an Executive Order to direct the Treasury to issue more debt. They point to Section 4 of the Fourteenth Amendment to the US Constitution, passed in the context of the Civil War Reconstruction, that states that the validity of the public debt shall not be questioned. Others rebutted this argument by pointing to Section 8 of Article 1 and Section 5 of the Fourteenth Amendment, which state that Congress has the power of the purse and the authority to enforce the Fourteenth Amendment.

Article I, Section 8. The Congress shall have power . . .To borrow Money on the credit of the United States;

Amendment XIV, Section 4. The validity of the public debt of the United States, authorized by law, including debts incurred for payment of pensions and bounties for services in suppressing insurrection or rebellion, shall not be questioned. But neither the United States nor any State shall assume or pay any debt or obligation incurred in aid of insurrection or rebellion against the United States, or any claim for the loss or emancipation of any slave; but all such debts, obligations and claims shall be held illegal and void.

Amendment XIV, Section 5. The Congress shall have power to enforce, by appropriate legislation, the provisions of this article.

Arguments

- Jack Balkin, looking into the Legislative History of the Fourteenth Amendment, argued that Section 4 was adopted to guard against politically determined default. Referencing the sponsor of the provision, Senator Benjamin Wade, Balkin argued that "the central rationale for Section Four ... was to remove threats of default on federal debts from partisan struggle." Balkin quotes Wade: "every man who has property in the public funds will feel safer when he sees that the national debt is withdrawn from the power of a Congress to repudiate it and placed under the guardianship of the Constitution than he would feel if it were left at loose ends and subject to the varying majorities which may arise in Congress." According to Balkin, this reveals "an important structural principle. The threat of defaulting on government obligations is a powerful weapon, especially in a complex, interconnected world economy. Devoted partisans can use it to disrupt government, to roil ordinary politics, to undermine policies they do not like, even to seek political revenge. Section Four was placed in the Constitution to remove this weapon from ordinary politics."
- Bruce Bartlett, a former adviser to President Ronald Reagan and columnist for The Fiscal Times, argued that Section 4 renders the debt ceiling unconstitutional, and that the President should disregard the debt limit.
- The Nation editor Katrina vanden Heuvel argued that the President could use the public debt section of the Fourteenth Amendment to force the Treasury to continue paying its debts if an agreement to raise the debt ceiling was not reached.
- Laurence Tribe, professor of Constitutional Law at Harvard Law School, called the argument that the public debt clause can nullify the debt ceiling "false hope" and noted that nothing in the Constitution enabled the President to "usurp legislative power" with regards to the debt. Tribe said that since Congress has means other than borrowing to pay the federal debt (including raising taxes, coining money, and selling federal assets), the argument that the President could seize the power to borrow could be extended to give the President the ability to seize those powers as well.

- Garrett Epps counter-argued that the President would not be usurping Congressional power by invoking Section 4 to declare the debt ceiling unconstitutional, because the debt ceiling exceeds Congressional authority. He called it legislative "double-counting," as paraphrased in The New Republic, "because Congress already appropriated the funds in question, it is the executive branch's duty to enact those appropriations." In other words, given Congress has appropriated money via federal programs, the Executive is obligated to enact and, therefore, fund them, but the debt ceiling's limit on debt prevents the executive from carrying out the instructions given by Congress, on the constitutional authority to set appropriations; essentially, to obey the statutory debt ceiling would require usurping congress' constitutional powers, and hence the statute must be unconstitutional.
- Former President Bill Clinton endorsed this counter-argument, saying he would eliminate the debt ceiling using the 14th Amendment. He called it "crazy" that Congress first appropriates funds and then gets a second vote on whether to pay.
- Matthew Zeitlin added to the counter-argument that, were Section 4 invoked, members of Congress would not have standing to sue the President for allegedly usurping congressional authority, even if they were willing to do so; and those likely to have standing would be people "designed to elicit zero public sympathy: those who purchased credit default swaps which would pay off in the event of government default". Matthew Steinglass argued that, because it would come down to the Supreme Court, the Court would not vote in favor of anyone who could and would sue: it would rule the debt ceiling unconstitutional. This is because, for the Court to rule to uphold the debt ceiling, it would, in effect, be voting for the United States to default, with the consequences that would entail; and, Steinglass argues, the Court would not do that.

- Michael Stern, Senior Counsel to the US House of Representatives from 1996 to 2004, stated that Garrett Epps "had adopted an overly broad interpretation of the Public Debt Clause and that this interpretation, even if accepted, could not justify invalidating the debt limit" because "the President's duty to safeguard the national debt no more enables him to assume Congress's power of the purse than it would enable him to assume the judicial power when (in his opinion) the Supreme Court acts in an unconstitutional manner."
- Rob Natelson, former Constitutional Law Professor at University of Montana, argued that "this is not some issue in the disputed boundaries between legislative and executive power." He continued, "That's why the Constitution itself (Article I, Section 8, Clause 2) gives only Congress, not the President, the power "To borrow Money on the credit of the United States." In another argument, Natelson stated that Bruce Bartlett "deftly omits a crucial part of the quote from the Fourteenth Amendment. It actually says, 'The validity of the public debt of the United States, AUTHORIZED BY LAW ... shall not be questioned.' In other words, Congress has to approve the debt for it not to be questioned. And note that this language refers to existing debt, not to creating new debt. He also neglects to mention that Section 5 of the Fourteenth Amendment specifically grants to Congress, not to the President, authority to enforce the amendment."
- Treasury Secretary Tim Geithner implied that the debt ceiling may violate the Constitution; however George Madison, General Counsel to the US Treasury, wrote that "Secretary Geithner has never argued that the 14th Amendment to the US Constitution allows the President to disregard the statutory debt limit" (but nor did Madison say that Geithner had argued against the proposition either), and that "the Constitution explicitly places the borrowing authority with Congress." He stated that "Secretary Geithner has always viewed the debt limit as a binding legal constraint that can only be raised by Congress."

==== Minting coins in extremely high denominations ====
US law does not place a limit on the denomination of minted coins, and specifically mentions that the Mint can create platinum coins of arbitrary value under the discretion of the Secretary of the Treasury. Yale law professor Jack Balkin mentioned seigniorage as a solution, although there had been speculation about the option of a "trillion-dollar coin" online since at least January 2011. Hence it has been suggested that a coin with a face value of a trillion or more could be minted and deposited with the Federal Reserve and used to buy back debt, thus making funds available.

==== Monetizing gold ====
A similar crisis was faced during the Eisenhower Administration in 1953. The debt ceiling was not raised until the spring of 1954. To accommodate the gap, the Eisenhower administration increased its gold certificate deposits at the Federal Reserve, which it could do because the market price of gold had increased. According to experts, the Secretary of the Treasury is authorized to monetize gold, valued under the old law at approximately $42 per ounce, but with a market value peaking over $1,900 in 2011.

== Agreement ==
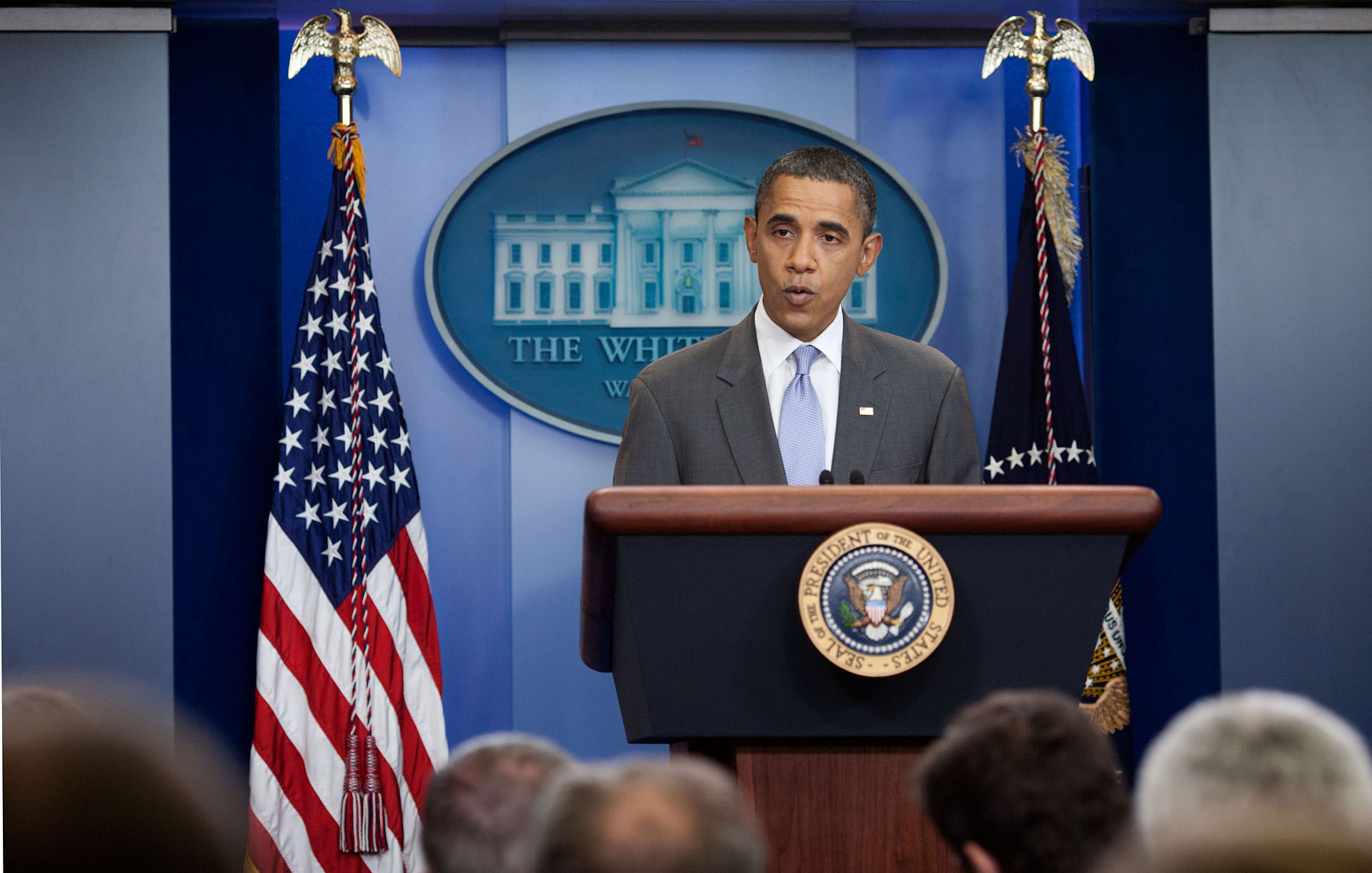
President Barack Obama makes a statement in the Brady Press Briefing Room at the White House announcing a deal that resolved the US debt ceiling crisis. July 31, 2011.

On July 31, 2011, President Obama announced that the leaders of both parties in both chambers had reached an agreement that would reduce the deficit and avoid default. The same day, Speaker Boehner's office outlined the agreement for House Republicans. According to the statement:

- The agreement cut spending more than it increased the debt limit. In the first installment ("tranche"), $917 billion would be cut over 10 years in exchange for increasing the debt limit by $900 billion.
- The agreement established a Congressional Joint Select Committee that would produce debt reduction legislation by November 23, 2011, that would be immune from amendments or filibuster. The goal of the legislation is to cut at least $1.5 trillion over the coming 10 years and should be passed by December 23, 2011. The committee would have 12 members, 6 from each party.
- Projected revenue from the Joint Select Committee's legislation must not exceed the revenue baseline produced by current law, which assumes the Bush tax cuts will expire entirely at the end of 2012.
- The agreement specified an incentive for Congress to act. If Congress fails to produce a deficit reduction bill with at least $1.2 trillion in cuts, then Congress can grant a $1.2 trillion increase in the debt ceiling. This would trigger across-the-board cuts ("sequestration") of spending, equally split between defense and non-defense programs. The cuts would apply to mandatory and discretionary spending in the years 2013 to 2021 and be in an amount equal to the difference between $1.2 trillion and the amount of deficit reduction enacted from the joint committee. The sequestration mechanism is the same as the Balanced Budget Act of 1997. There are exemptions—across the board cuts would apply to Medicare, but not to Social Security, Medicaid, civil and military employee pay, or veterans.
- Congress must vote on a Balanced Budget Amendment between October 1, 2011, and the end of the year.
- The debt ceiling may be increased an additional $1.5 trillion if either one of the following two conditions are met:
  - A balanced budget amendment is sent to the states
  - The joint committee cuts spending by a greater amount than the requested debt ceiling increase

Most of the $900 billion in cuts occur in future years, and so will not remove significant capital from the economy in the current and following year. The across-the-board cuts could not take place until 2013. If they are triggered, a new Congress could vote to reduce, eliminate, or deepen all or part of them. Under the U.S. Constitution, the President could veto such a future bill passed by Congress; in such a scenario, Congress would have pass a bill to override this veto by a two-thirds majority of each house of Congress.

The agreement, entitled the Budget Control Act of 2011, passed the House on August 1, 2011, by a vote of 269–161; 174 Republicans and 95 Democrats voted for it, while 66 Republicans and 95 Democrats voted against it. The Senate passed the agreement on August 2, 2011, by a vote of 74–26; 7 Democrats and 19 Republicans voted against it. Obama signed the bill shortly after it was passed by the Senate.

== Reaction ==
=== US reaction ===
The national debt rose $238 billion (or about 60% of the new debt ceiling) on August 3, the largest one-day increase in the history of the United States. The US debt surpassed 100 percent of gross domestic product for the first time since World War II. According to the International Monetary Fund, the US joined a group of countries whose public debt exceeds their GDP. The group includes Japan (229 percent), Greece (152 percent), Jamaica (137 percent), Lebanon (134 percent), Italy (120 percent), Ireland (114 percent), and Iceland (103 percent).

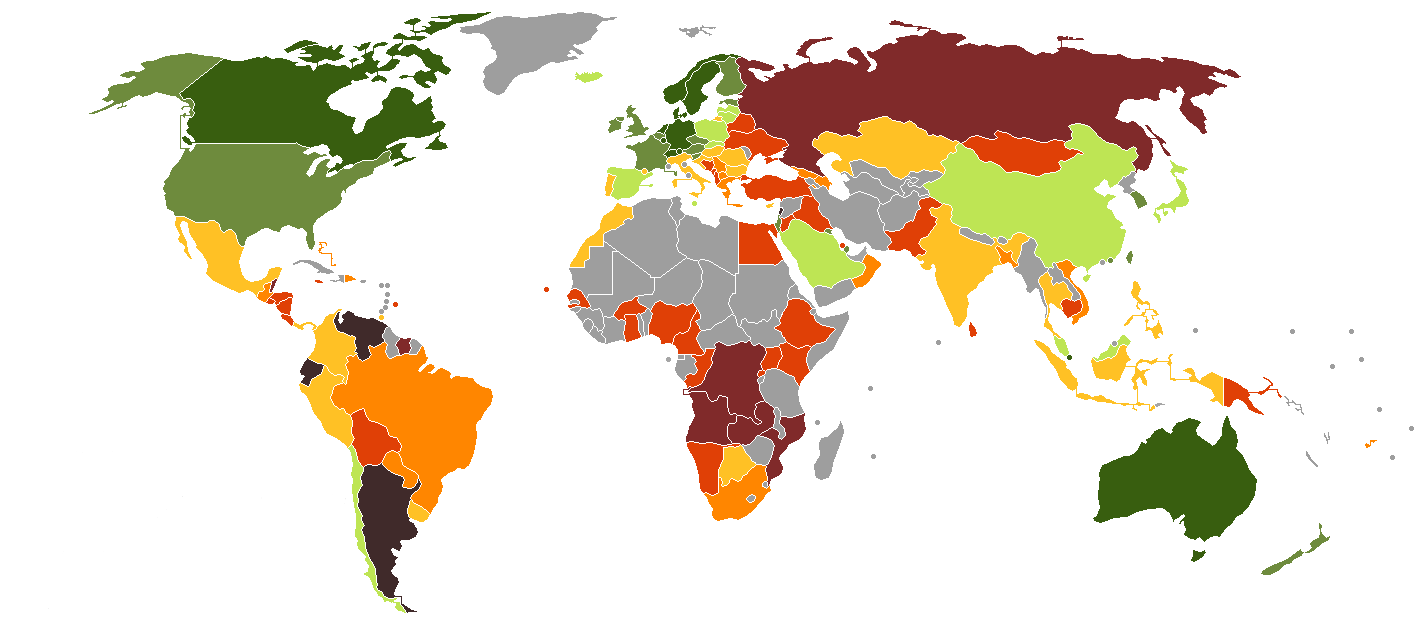
Countries by Standard & Poor's Foreign Rating: AAA / AA / A / BBB / BB / B / CCC / CC/D

The NASDAQ, ASX, and S&P 100 lost up to four percent in value, the largest drop since July 2009, during the Great Recession that was precipitated in part by the United States housing bubble and the corresponding losses by holders of mortgages and mortgage-backed securities. The commodities market also took losses, with average spot crude oil prices falling below $US86 a barrel. The price of gold fell, as deepening losses on Wall Street prompted investors to sell.

On August 5, 2011, Standard & Poor's credit rating agency downgraded the long-term credit rating of the United States government for the first time in its history, from AAA to AA+. In contrast with previous ratings, the agency assumed in the base case scenario that the tax cuts of 2001 and 2003 would not expire at the end of 2012, citing Congressional resistance to revenue raising measures. The downside scenario, the conditions that would likely lead to a further downgrade to AA, assumed that the second round of spending cuts would fail to occur and that yield on Treasury bonds would increase but the dollar would remain the key global reserve currency. The upside scenario, consistent with maintaining the new AA+ rating, included the expiration of the 2001 and 2003 tax cuts and only modest growth in government debt as a percentage of GDP over the coming decade. A week later, S&P senior director Joydeep Mukherji said that one factor was that numerous American politicians expressed skepticism about the serious consequences of a default—an attitude that he said was "not common" among countries with a AAA rating. At the end of 2012, the United States fiscal cliff was resolved in a compromise without expiring the 2001 and 2003 tax cuts, but S&P did not downgrade to AA. The other two major credit rating agencies, Moody's and Fitch, continued to rate the federal government's bonds as AAA.

In a joint press release on the same day from the Federal Reserve System, the Federal Deposit Insurance Corporation, the National Credit Union Administration, and the Office of the Comptroller of the Currency, federally regulated institutions were told that for risk-based capital purposes, the debt of the United States was still considered to be risk free.

==== Congressional reaction ====
- Senate Minority Leader Mitch McConnell, on the GOP: "I think some of our members may have thought the default issue was a hostage you might take a chance at shooting. Most of us didn't think that. What we did learn is this – it's a hostage that's worth ransoming. And it focuses the Congress on something that must be done."

Boehner was reported to be particularly concerned that any defense cuts could not go into effect until after 2013.

=== International reaction ===
The international community characterized the political brinkmanship in Washington as playing a game of chicken, and criticized the US government for "dangerously irresponsible" actions.

International reaction to the US credit rating downgrade has been mixed. Australian Prime Minister Julia Gillard urged calm over the downgrade, since only one of the three major credit rating agencies decided to lower its rating. On August 6, 2011, China, the largest foreign holder of United States debt, said that Washington needed to "cure its addiction to debts" and "live within its means". The Chinese state media outlet Xinhua News Agency was critical of the US government, questioned whether the US dollar should continue to be the global reserve currency, and called for international supervision over the issue of US dollar.

The downgrade started a sell-off in every major stock market index around the world, threatening a stock market crash in the international markets. The G7 finance ministers scheduled a meeting to discuss the possible crisis.

=== Political aftermath ===
Politically, the crisis led to a drop in support for the Republican Party, whose support for the debt-ceiling deal was needed as it controlled the House. The party saw its approval ratings drop from 41% in July to 33% in August. Nevertheless, President Obama saw his approval ratings drop to a record low of 40 percent in regards to his handling of the crisis.

== Timeline ==
- December 16, 2009: The debt ceiling was exceeded. To avoid default, the Treasury Department used "extraordinary accounting tools" to enable the Treasury to make an additional $150 billion available to meet the necessary federal obligations.
- February 12, 2010: Increase in the debt ceiling signed into law by President Obama, after being passed by the Democratic 111th United States Congress. It increased the debt ceiling by $1.9 trillion from $12.394 trillion to $14.294 trillion.
- February 18, 2010: Obama issued an Executive Order to establish the National Commission on Fiscal Responsibility and Reform, also known as the Bowles-Simpson Commission. The mission of the commission was to propose recommendations designed to balance the budget, excluding interest payments on the debt, by 2015. It was tasked to issue a report with a set of recommendations by December 1, 2010.
- November 2, 2010: The Republican Party gained 63 seats in the US House of Representatives in the United States midterm elections, recapturing the majority by 242–193 in the 112th Congress. Major planks for the House Republicans during the election campaign were cutting federal spending and stopping any tax increases.
- December 1, 2010: The Bowles-Simpson Commission on Fiscal Responsibility and Reform issued its report, but the recommendations failed to win support of at least 14 of the 18 members necessary to adopt it formally. The recommendations were never adopted by Congress nor President Obama.
- January 6, April 4, and May 2, 2011: Secretary of the Treasury Timothy Geithner sent letters requesting an increase in the debt ceiling.
- January 25, 2011: Senator Pat Toomey introduces the Full Faith And Credit Act bill [S.163] that would require the Treasury to prioritize payments to service the national debt over other obligations. The bill was never debated.
- January 28, 2011: Moody's Investors Service said it may place a "negative" outlook on the AAA rating of US debt sooner than anticipated, as the country's budget deficit widened.
- February 14, 2011: Obama released his budget proposal for fiscal year 2012. Republicans criticized the budget for doing too little to rein in the burgeoning US deficit. The CBO analysis, released in April 2011, estimated that the budget would increase total deficits over 10 years by $2.7 trillion: from $6.7 trillion of the March 2011 baseline to $9.4 trillion with the proposed budget. The Senate rejected the budget proposal on May 25, 2011 (see below).
- April 14, 2011: Both the House of Representatives and the Senate voted in favor of the 2011 US federal budget, 260–167 and 81–19 respectively. This budget projected the 2011 deficit to be $1.645 trillion, and therefore ensured that the debt ceiling would be hit during this fiscal year.
- April 15, 2011: On a party-line vote 235–193, the House of Representatives passed the Republican 2012 budget proposal aimed to reduce total spending by $5.8 trillion and reduce total deficits by $4.4 trillion over 10 years compared to the current-policy baseline. It included reform to Medicare and Medicaid entitlement programs, which the Democrats criticized as an attempt to leave seniors and poor holding the bag on health care costs. The criticism resonated with the many in the public, who voiced opposition to the proposed changes. The Senate rejected the budget proposal on May 25, 2011 (see below).
- April 18, 2011: Standard & Poor's Ratings Services revised its outlook on the US to negative due to recent and expected further deterioration in the US fiscal profile, and of the ability and willingness of the US to soon reverse this trend. With the negative outlook, S&P believed there is a likelihood of at least one-in-three of a downward rating adjustment within two years.
- May 16, 2011: The debt ceiling is reached. Treasury Secretary Timothy Geithner issued a debt issuance suspension period, directing the Treasury to utilize "extraordinary measures" to fund federal obligations.
- May 18, 2011: Bipartisan deficit-reduction talks among the "Gang of Six" high-profile Senators are suspended when Republican Tom Coburn drops out.
- May 24, 2011: Vice President Joe Biden and four Democratic lawmakers begin meeting with the Republican House Majority Leader Eric Cantor and the Republican Senate Minority Whip Jon Kyl, in an effort to continue the talks. Cantor said that these talks would lay the groundwork for further discussions between President Obama, Republican Speaker of the House John Boehner, and other leaders of Congress.
- May 25, 2011: The Senate rejected both the Republican House budget proposal, by a vote of 57–40, and the Obama budget proposal, by a vote of 97–0.
- May 31, 2011: The House voted on a bill to raise the debt ceiling without any spending cuts tied to the increase. President Obama asked Congress to raise the debt ceiling in a 'clean' vote that included no other conditions. The bill, which would have raised the debt ceiling by $2.4 trillion, failed by a vote of 97–318. Democrats accused Republicans of playing politics by holding a vote they knew would fail.
- June 23, 2011: Biden's negotiations on the debt ceiling were cut off when both Eric Cantor and Jon Kyl walk out over disagreements on taxes.
- July 19, 2011: The Republican Majority in the House brought the Cut, Cap and Balance Act (H.R.2560), their proposed solution to the crisis, to a vote. They passed the bill by a vote of 234–190, split closely along party lines: 229 Republicans and 5 Democrats 'for', 181 Democrats and 9 Republicans 'against'; it was sent to the Senate for consideration. The Bill authorized that the debt ceiling be raised by $2.4 trillion after a Balanced Budget Amendment was passed by Congress. Since Constitutional amendments require a two-thirds majority vote in both chambers of Congress to pass, a vote for a Balanced Budget Amendment would require more support than the Cut, Cap and Balance Act bill achieved in the House vote.
- July 22, 2011: The Senate voted along party lines to table the Cut, Cap and Balance Act; 51 Democrats voting to table it and 46 Republicans voting to bring it to a debate. Senate Majority Leader Harry Reid called the Act "one of the worst pieces of legislation to ever be placed on the floor of the United States Senate". Even had it passed Congress, Obama had promised to veto the bill.
- July 25, 2011: Republicans and Democrats outlined separate deficit-reduction proposals.
- July 25, 2011: Obama and Speaker of the House John Boehner addressed the nation separately over network television with regards to the debt ceiling.
- July 25, 2011: The bond market is shaken by a single $850 million futures trade betting on US default.
- July 29, 2011: The Budget Control Act of 2011 S. 627, a Republican bill that immediately raised the debt ceiling by $900 billion and reduced spending by $917 billion, passed in the House on a vote of 218–210. No Democrats voted for it, and it also drew 'no' votes from 22 Republicans, who deemed it insufficiently tough on spending cuts. It allows the President to request a second increase in the debt ceiling of up to $1.6 trillion upon passage of the balanced-budget amendment and a separate $1.8 trillion deficit reduction package, to be written by a new "joint committee of Congress". Upon introduction into the Senate in the evening, the bill was immediately tabled on a 59–41 vote, including some Republican votes.
- July 30, 2011: The House of Representatives voted 173–246 to defeat Senate Majority Leader Harry Reid's $2.4 trillion plan to reduce the deficit and raise the debt ceiling.
- July 31, 2011: President Barack Obama announced that leaders of both parties had reached an agreement to lift the debt ceiling and reduce the federal deficit. Separately, House Speaker John Boehner told Republicans that they had reached the framework for an agreement. Boehner revealed details of the agreement in a presentation to the House Republicans.
- August 1, 2011: The House passed a bipartisan bill by a vote of 269–161. 174 Republicans and 95 Democrats voted 'yes'; 66 Republicans and 95 Democrats voted 'no'.
- August 2, 2011: The Senate passed the bill by a vote of 74–26. 28 Republicans, 45 Democrats, and 1 independent voted 'yes'; 19 Republicans, 6 Democrats, and 1 independent voted 'no'. President Obama signed the debt ceiling bill the same day, thus ending fears of a default. Obama also declared that the bill is an "important first step to ensuring that as a nation we live within our means".
- August 2, 2011: The date estimated by the Department of the Treasury that the borrowing authority of the US would be exhausted, if the debt ceiling crisis were not resolved.
- August 3, 2011: The Treasury increased the national debt by $238 billion.
- August 5, 2011: Standard & Poor's lowered the credit rating of the United States from AAA to AA+, citing Congressional resistance to new revenue measures and uncontrolled growth of entitlement programs. The agency rated the long-term outlook as negative, citing uncertainty in debt growth dynamics.
- August 9, 2011. The US Federal Reserve announced it will keep interest rates at "exceptionally low levels" at least through mid-2013; it made no commitment for further quantitative easing. (Reuters) The Dow Jones Industrial Average and the New York Stock Exchange as well as other world stock markets, recovered after recent falls. (Wall Street Journal)
- August 15, 2011: The date estimated by the Fitch rating agency and the FRBNY primary dealer Jefferies & Co that $29 billion of federal debt interest would have become due, thus triggering a technical sovereign default if the debt ceiling crisis had not been resolved. This, however, did not occur as the debt ceiling crisis was resolved by then.

== See also ==
- Budget Control Act of 2011
- European sovereign debt crisis
- History of United States debt-ceiling increases
- 2008 financial crisis
- 2013 United States debt-ceiling crisis
- 2023 United States debt-ceiling crisis
- United States Congress Joint Select Committee on Deficit Reduction
- United States federal government credit-rating downgrades
- 1995–1996 United States federal government shutdowns
- Sovereign default
