= China Reform Holdings Corporation =

Chinese state-owned investment holding company

China Reform Holdings Corporation Ltd
- Native name: 中国国新控股有限责任公司
- Company type: State-owned enterprise
- Industry: Financial services
- Founded: 22 December 2010; 15 years ago
- Headquarters: Beijing, China
- Key people: Zhou Yubo (Chairman)
- Products: Asset management Securities brokerage Business consulting
- Operating income: ▼CN¥20.14 billion (2023)
- Net income: ▼CN¥17.80 billion (2023)
- Total assets: ▲CN¥906.99 billion (2023)
- Total equity: ▲CN¥361.45 billion (2023)
- Subsidiaries: China Reform Fund Management; China State-owned Asset Venture Capital Investment Fund; China Reform Securities; China Reform Consulting
- Website: www.crhc.cn

The China Reform Holdings Corporation (CRHC; Chinese: 中国国新控股有限责任公司; pinyin: Zhōngguó Guóxīnkònggǔ Yǒuxiànzérèngōngsī) is a Chinese state-owned investment holding company. The company's purpose is to make investments in industries related to the national security and economy of China.

In June 2022, Private Equity International ranked China Reform Fund Management, the private equity arm of CRHC as the largest private equity firm in Asia-Pacific based on total fundraising over the most recent five-year period.

As of August 2022, CRHC had invested in 163 state-owned enterprises (SOEs) listed on Chinese stock exchanges with 75% of them being in strategic emerging industries.

== Background ==
On 22 December 2010, the SASAC established CRHC with an initial registered capital of 4.5 billion yuan ($676.5 million). It was originally set up to speed up the restructuring of smaller and noncompetitive SOEs by providing capital and helping with share sales. Xie Qihua who was previously Chairwomen of Baowu and Head of the China Iron and Steel Association was selected to be the first chairperson of the new company.

CRHC has taken over some SOEs such as China Huaxing Group and China Printing Group.

In February 2016, it was announced that CRHC would become an industrial asset manager and would take broader responsibilities for investing and managing shareholdings on behalf of the government.

In August 2016, China launched a 200 billion yuan ($30.2 billion) venture capital fund which would be managed and controlled by CRHC. CRHC itself contributed 34 billion yuan to the fund while other contributors included Postal Savings Bank of China and China Construction Bank.

As of 2019, CRHC had 700 billion yuan ($100 billion) in assets under management.

In November 2019, CRHC and the Ministry of Industry and Information Technology set up a 50 billion yuan ($7 billion) investment fund to facilitate the development of the security industry.

In July 2020, CRHC and 31 other SOEs set up a bailout fund of 100 billion yuan ($14.3 billion) to deal with potential bond defaults by SOEs.

In May 2021, CRHC set up a series of funds worth 70 billion yuan ($11 billion) that would invest in SOEs to drive corporate reform.

In January 2022, CRHC acquired a 72% stake in the securities brokerage unit of China Huarong Asset Management for 10.93 billion yuan ($1.72 billion). The unit now operates as China Reform Securities.

In September 2022, CRHC and the Shanghai Stock Exchange teamed up to compile stock market indexes that track SOEs called the 1+N’ indexes.

In November 2023, it was reported that CRHC was planning to create a new fund worth $14 billion to invest in strategically important emerging industries in China. More than 20 investors had shown interest in it.

== Notable deals ==
In May 2014, CRHC was part of the consortium that funded MMG Limited's acquisition of Las Bambas copper mine in a $5.85 billion deal.

In October 2015, CRHC acquired a 6% stake of China Tower for 10 billion yuan ($1.6 billion).

In November 2015, PetroChina sold 50% of its Trans-Asia Gas Pipeline unit to CRHC for 15.5 billion yuan ($2.4 billion).

In February 2016, CRHC was part of the consortium that funded ChemChina's acquisition of Syngenta in a $43 billion deal.

In November 2016, CRHC backed private equity firm, Canyon Bridge Capital Partners to acquire Lattice Semiconductor for $1.3 billion. The purchase was in September 2017 blocked by US President Donald Trump based on the recommendation of the Committee on Foreign Investment in the United States on national security grounds under the Exon–Florio Amendment.

In November 2019, CRHC acquired a 58% stake in Dagong Global Credit Rating as part of its rectification process after it was suspended in 2018 following accusations of corruption and doctored ratings in exchange for fees.
