= History of the United States debt ceiling =

The history of the United States debt ceiling deals with movements in the United States debt ceiling since it was created in 1917. Management of the United States public debt is an important part of the macroeconomics of the United States economy and finance system, and the debt ceiling is a limitation on the federal government's ability to manage the economy and finance system. The debt ceiling is also a limitation on the federal government's ability to finance government operations, and the failure of Congress to authorize an increase in the debt ceiling has resulted in crises, especially in recent years.

== Overview ==
A statutorily imposed debt ceiling has been in effect since 1917 when the US Congress passed the Second Liberty Bond Act. Before 1917 there was no debt ceiling in force, but there were parliamentary procedural limitations on the amount of debt that could be issued by the government.

Except for about a year during 1835–1836, the United States has continuously had a fluctuating public debt since the US Constitution legally went into effect on March 4, 1789. Debts incurred during the American Revolutionary War and under the Articles of Confederation led to the first yearly report on the amount of the debt ($75,463,476.52 on January 1, 1791). The national debt, as expressed in absolute dollars, has increased under every presidential administration since Herbert Hoover.

== Early history ==
Prior to 1917, the United States did not have a debt ceiling, with Congress either authorizing specific loans or allowing the Treasury to issue certain debt instruments and individual debt issues for specific purposes. Sometimes Congress gave the Treasury discretion over what type of debt instrument would be issued.

Between 1788 and 1917, Congress would authorize each bond issued by the United States Treasury by passing a legislative act that approved the issue and the amount.

In 1917, during World War I, Congress created the debt ceiling with the Second Liberty Bond Act of 1917, which allowed the Treasury to issue bonds and take on other debt without specific Congressional approval, as long as the total debt fell under the statutory debt ceiling. The 1917 legislation set limits on the aggregate amount of debt that could be accumulated through individual categories of debt (such as bonds and bills).

=== Public Debt Acts ===
In 1939, Congress instituted the first limit on total accumulated debt over all kinds of instruments. The debt ceiling, in which an aggregate limit is applied to nearly all federal debt, was substantially established by Public Debt Acts passed in 1939 and 1941 and subsequently amended. The United States Public Debt Act of 1939 eliminated separate limits on different types of debt. The Public Debt Act of 1941 raised the aggregate debt limit on all obligations to $65 billion, and consolidated nearly all federal borrowing under the U.S. Treasury and eliminated the tax-exemption of interest and profit on government debt.

Subsequent Public Debt Acts amended the aggregate debt limit: the 1942, 1943, 1944, and 1945 acts raised the limit to $125 billion, $210 billion, $260 billion, and $300 billion respectively. In 1946, the Public Debt Act was amended to reduce the debt limit to $275 billion. The limit stayed unchanged until 1954, the Korean War being financed through taxation. The U.S. Treasury nearly hit the debt ceiling in fall 1953, plus the Senate refused to raise it until summer 1954, but the federal government managed to avoid reaching it through using various measures, such as monetizing leftover gold.

A feature of the Public Debt Acts, unlike the 1919 Victory Liberty Bond Act which financed American costs in the First World War, was that the new ceiling was set about 10% above the actual federal debt at the time.

== 1970s ==
Prior to the Budget and Impoundment Control Act of 1974, the debt ceiling played an important role since Congress had few opportunities to hold hearings and debates on the budget. James Surowiecki argued that the debt ceiling lost its usefulness after these reforms to the budget process.

In 1979, noting the potential problems of hitting a default, Dick Gephardt (Rep, D-MO) imposed the "Gephardt Rule," a parliamentary rule that deemed the debt ceiling raised when a budget was passed. This resolved the contradiction in voting for appropriations but not voting to fund them. The rule stood until it was repealed by Congress in 1995.

== Number of requests for increase ==
Depending on who is doing the research, it is said that the US has raised its debt ceiling (in some form or other) at least 90 times in the 20th century.

The debt ceiling was raised 74 times from March 1962 to May 2011, including 18 times under Ronald Reagan, eight times under Bill Clinton, and seven times under George W. Bush.

Congress has raised the debt ceiling 14 times from 2001 to 2016. The debt ceiling was raised a total of 7 times (total increase of $5.365 trillion) during President Bush's eight-year term and it was raised 11 times (total increase of $6.498 trillion) during President Obama's eight years in office.

== 1995 debt ceiling crisis ==
The 1995 request for a debt ceiling increase led to debate in Congress on reduction of the size of the federal government, which led to the non-passage of the federal budget, and the United States federal government shutdown of 1995–96. The ceiling was eventually increased and the government shutdown resolved.

== 2011 debt ceiling crisis ==
In 2011, Republicans in Congress used the debt ceiling as leverage for deficit reduction because of the lack of Congressional normal order for fiscal year budget votes on the chamber floors and subsequent conference reconciliations between the House and the Senate for final budgets. The credit downgrade and debt ceiling debacle contributed to the Dow Jones Industrial Average falling 2,000 points in late July and August. Following the downgrade itself, the DJIA had one of its worst days in history and fell 635 points on August 8. The GAO estimated that the delay in raising the debt ceiling raised borrowing costs for the government by $1.3 billion (~$1.78 billion in 2024) in 2011 and noted that the delay would also raise costs in later years. The Bipartisan Policy Center extended the GAO's estimates and found that the delay raised borrowing costs by $18.9 billion over ten years.

== 2013 debt ceiling crisis ==
Following the increase in the debt ceiling to $16.394 trillion in 2011, the United States again reached the debt ceiling on December 31, 2012, and the Treasury began taking extraordinary measures. The fiscal cliff was resolved with the passage of the American Taxpayer Relief Act of 2012 (ATRA), but no action was taken on the debt ceiling. With the ATRA tax cuts, the government indicated that the debt ceiling needed to raise by $700 billion (~$927 billion in 2024) for it to continue financing operations for the rest of the 2013 fiscal year and that extraordinary measures were expected to be exhausted by February 15. Treasury has said it is not set up to prioritize payments, and it's not clear that it would be legal to do so. Given this situation, Treasury would simply delay payments if funds could not be raised through extraordinary measures and the debt ceiling had not been raised. This would put a freeze on 7% of the nation's GDP, a contraction greater than the Great Recession. The economic damage would worsen as recipients of social security benefits, government contracts, and other government payments cut back on spending in response to having the freeze in their revenue.

The No Budget, No Pay Act of 2013 suspended the debt ceiling from February 4, 2013, until May 19, 2013. On May 19, the debt ceiling was formally raised to approximately $16.699 trillion to accommodate the borrowing done during the suspension period. However, after the end of the suspension, the ceiling was raised only to the actual debt at that time, and Treasury needed to activate extraordinary measures to avoid a default. With the impacts of the American Taxpayer Relief Act of 2012 tax increases on those who make $400,000 per year, the 2013 sequester, and a $60 billion payment from Fannie Mae and Freddie Mac that reached the Treasury on June 28, 2013, the extraordinary measures were predicted to last until October 17 by the Treasury, but financial firms suggested funds might have lasted a little longer. Jefferies Group said extraordinary measures might have lasted until the end of October while Credit Suisse estimated mid-November.

The US Treasury began taking extraordinary measures to enable payments, and stated that it would delay payments if funds could not be raised through extraordinary measures, and the debt ceiling was not raised. During the crisis, approval ratings for the Republican Party declined.

== 2021 debt ceiling crisis ==
Following the July 2021 expiration of the debt ceiling suspension, the U.S. Treasury began taking "extraordinary measures" which were set to expire around October 18. Senate Republicans blocked attempts to raise the ceiling using the filibuster, insisting that Democrats should act on their own and use reconciliation to raise the limit. The Senate voted to raise it on October 7, 2021, but only to grant the U.S. Treasury authority to borrow money until that December. That month, Congress voted to increase it by $2.5 (~$2.85 trillion in 2024) trillion, which President Biden signed into effect on December 16, 2021. At that point, it was set at about $31.4 trillion.

== 2023 debt ceiling crisis ==
On January 19, 2023, the United States again reached the debt ceiling. President Biden at first refused to negotiate, instead insisting on a clean debt ceiling raise. Many news outlets and pundits have talked about this leading to a significant risk that the US defaults on its obligations, though default is not the only possible outcome of the debt ceiling not being raised, the alternative being shutting down portions of government operations. The Treasury has, however, explicitly stated that this would be technically impossible. Many news outlets have also claimed that the federal government has not defaulted on financial obligations before, including President Biden calling such a situation "unprecedented", however a more accurate statement is that the US has defaulted on obligations several times in history, but never because of the debt ceiling. These included late interest payments in 1814 due to the financial strain of the War of 1812 (the last time the US experienced a "major default on its financial obligations"), and briefly in 1979, due to technical glitches.

== Historical debt ceiling levels ==
Note that this table does not go back to 1917 when the debt ceiling started.

Table of historical debt ceiling levels
Date	Debt Ceiling (billions of dollars)	Change in Debt Ceiling (billions of dollars)	Statute
June 25, 1940	49		
February 19, 1941	65	+16	
March 28, 1942	125	+60	
April 11, 1943	210	+85	
June 9, 1944	260	+50	
April 3, 1945	300	+40	
June 26, 1946	275	−25	
August 28, 1954	281	+6	
July 9, 1956	275	−6	
February 26, 1958	280	+5	
September 2, 1958	288	+8	
June 30, 1959	295	+7	
June 30, 1960	293	−2	
June 30, 1961	298	+5	
July 1, 1962	308	+10	
March 31, 1963	305	−3	
June 25, 1963	300	−5	
June 30, 1963	307	+7	
August 31, 1963	309	+2	
November 26, 1963	315	+6	
June 29, 1964	324	+9	
June 24, 1965	328	+4	
June 24, 1966	330	+2	
March 2, 1967	336	+6	
June 30, 1967	358	+22	
June 1, 1968	365	+7	
April 7, 1969	377	+12	
June 30, 1970	395	+18	
March 17, 1971	430	+35	
March 15, 1972	450	+20	
October 27, 1972	465	+15	
June 30, 1974	495	+30	
February 19, 1975	577	+82	
November 14, 1975	595	+18	
March 15, 1976	627	+32	
June 30, 1976	636	+9	
September 30, 1976	682	+46	
April 1, 1977	700	+18	
October 4, 1977	752	+52	
August 3, 1978	798	+46	
April 2, 1979	830	+32	
September 29, 1979	879	+49	
June 28, 1980	925	+46	
December 19, 1980	935	+10	
February 7, 1981	985	+50	
September 30, 1981	1,079	+94	
June 28, 1982	1,143	+64	
September 30, 1982	1,290	+147	
May 26, 1983	1,389	+99	Pub. L. 98–34
November 21, 1983	1,490	+101	Pub. L. 98–161
May 25, 1984	1,520	+30	
June 6, 1984	1,573	+53	Pub. L. 98–342
October 13, 1984	1,823	+250	Pub. L. 98–475
November 14, 1985	1,904	+81	
December 12, 1985	2,079	+175	Pub. L. 99–177
August 21, 1986	2,111	+32	Pub. L. 99–384
October 21, 1986	2,300	+189	
May 15, 1987	2,320	+20	
August 10, 1987	2,352	+32	
September 29, 1987	2,800	+448	Pub. L. 100–119
August 7, 1989	2,870	+70	
November 8, 1989	3,123	+253	Pub. L. 101–140
August 9, 1990	3,195	+72	
October 28, 1990	3,230	+35	
November 5, 1990	4,145	+915	Pub. L. 101–508
April 6, 1993	4,370	+225	
August 10, 1993	4,900	+530	Pub. L. 103–66
March 29, 1996	5,500	+600	Pub. L. 104–121 (text) (PDF)
August 5, 1997	5,950	+450	Pub. L. 105–33 (text) (PDF)
June 11, 2002	6,400	+450	Pub. L. 107–199 (text) (PDF)
May 27, 2003	7,384	+984	Pub. L. 108–24 (text) (PDF)
November 16, 2004	8,184	+800	Pub. L. 108–415 (text) (PDF)
March 20, 2006	8,965	+781	Pub. L. 109–182 (text) (PDF)
September 29, 2007	9,815	+850	Pub. L. 110–91 (text) (PDF)
June 5, 2008	10,615	+800	Pub. L. 110–289 (text) (PDF)
October 3, 2008	11,315	+700	Pub. L. 110–343 (text) (PDF)
February 17, 2009	12,104	+789	Pub. L. 111–5 (text) (PDF)
December 24, 2009	12,394	+290	Pub. L. 111–123 (text) (PDF)
February 12, 2010	14,294	+1,900	Pub. L. 111–139 (text) (PDF)
January 30, 2012	16,394	+2,100	Pub. L. 112–25 (text) (PDF)
February 4, 2013	Suspended		
May 19, 2013	16,699	+305	Pub. L. 113–3 (text) (PDF)
October 17, 2013	Suspended		
February 7, 2014	17,212 and auto-adjust	+213	Pub. L. 113–83 (text) (PDF)
March 15, 2015	18,113; End of auto adjust	+901	Pub. L. 113–83 (text) (PDF)
October 30, 2015	Suspended		Pub. L. 114–74 (text) (PDF)
March 15, 2017	19,847 (de facto)	+1,734	(Note: No official ceiling published. The debt on March 15, 2017 was $19.846 trillion after reaching an all time high of $19.977 trillion on December 30, 2016. See the US government database on the debt.)
September 8, 2017	Suspended	(Note: The debt rose to over $20.1 trillion on September 8, 2017, when the bill to continue the debt limit suspension for fiscal 2018 was passed. The fiscal year started at over $20.3 trillion of debt. US government database on the debt.)	Pub. L. 115–56 (text) (PDF) Pub. L. 115–123 (text) (PDF)
March 1, 2019	22,030 (de facto)	+2,183	
August 2, 2019	Suspended	(Note: The debt rose to over $22.31 trillion on August 2, 2019. US government database on the debt;.)	Pub. L. 116–37 (text) (PDF)
July 31, 2021	28,500 (de facto)	+6,470	
October 14, 2021	28,900	+480	Pub. L. 117–50 (text) (PDF)
December 16, 2021	31,400	+2,500	Pub. L. 117–73 (text) (PDF)
June 3, 2023	Suspended		
January 2, 2025	36,100 (de facto)	+4,700	
July 4, 2025	41,100	+5,000	Pub. L. 119–21 (text) (PDF)

Reference for values between 1993 and 2015:

Note that:

1. The figures are unadjusted for the time value of money, such as interest and inflation and the size of the economy that generated a debt.
2. The debt ceiling is an aggregate of gross debt, which includes debt in hands of public and in intragovernment accounts.
3. The debt ceiling does not necessarily reflect the level of actual debt.
4. From March 15 to October 30, 2015 there was a de facto debt limit of $18.153 trillion, due to use of extraordinary measures.

== Sources ==
- "Amerikanere kan lære af dansk gældsloft". DR Nyheder. 3 August 2011.
- "Analysis of 2011-2012 Actions Taken and Effect of Delayed Increase on Borrowing Costs" (PDF). GAO. July 2012.
- Austin, D. Andrew (29 April 2008). "The Debt Limit: History and Recent Increases" (PDF). Congressional Research Service.
- Austin, D. Andrew; Levit, Mindy R. (27 December 2012). "The Debt Limit: History and Recent Increases" (PDF). Congressional Research Service.
- Austin, D. Andrew (5 June 2017). "The Debt Limit Since 2011" Congressional Research Service.
- "Debt ceiling". IGM Forum. Chicago Booth. 15 January 2013.
- "Federal Debt and the Statutory Limit, November 2012" (PDF). Congressional Budget Office. November 2012.
- "Debt Limit Analysis" (PDF). Bipartisan Policy Center. 27 November 2012. Archived from the original (PDF) on 20 January 2013.
- "Delays Create Debt Management Challenges and Increase Uncertainty in the Treasury Market" (PDF). GAO-11-203. GAO. February 2011.
- Green, Joshua (9 May 2011). "How Dick Gephardt Fixed the Debt-Ceiling Problem". The Atlantic.
- Kowalcky, Linda W.; LeLoup, Lance T. (1993). "Congress and the Politics of Statutory Debt Limitation". Public Administration Review. 53 (1): 14. doi:10.2307/977272. JSTOR 977272.
- Lawder, David (29 June 2011). "Prioritizing debt payments won't work: Geithner". Reuters.
- Levit, Mandy R.; Brass, Clinton T.; Nicola, Timothy J.; Nuschler, Dawn. "Reaching the Debt Limit: Background and Potential Effects on Government Operations" (PDF).
- Masters, Jonathan. "U.S. Debt Ceiling: Costs and Consequences". Renewing America. Council on Foreign Relations. Archived from the original on 2013-09-08.
- Sahadi, Jeanne (7 January 2013). "Debt Ceiling: 'Chaotic' choices on 100 million payments". CNNMoney. Archived from the original on January 9, 2013.
- Surowiecki, James (1 August 2011). "Smash the Ceiling". The New Yorker.
- Sweet, Ken (8 August 2011). "Dow plunges after S&P downgrade". CNNMoney. Archived from the original on August 8, 2011.
- Yglesias, Matthew (16 January 2013). "What if Congress Doesn't Raise the Debt Ceiling?". Slate.
