= No Budget, No Pay Act of 2013 =

- Long title: To ensure the complete and timely payment of the obligations of the United States Government until May 19, 2013, and for other purposes.
- Announced in: the 113th United States Congress
- Sponsored by: Rep. Dave Camp (R, MI-4)
- Number of co-sponsors: 1

Codification
- Acts affected: Congressional Budget Act of 1974
- U.S.C. sections affected: 31 U.S.C. § 3101(b), 31 U.S.C. § 3101(b), 31 U.S.C. § 3101A, chapter 31 of such title
- Agencies affected: United States Congress, United States Senate, United States House of Representatives, United States Department of the Treasury,

[H.R. 325 Legislative history]
- Introduced in the House as H.R. 325 by Rep. Dave Camp (R-MI) on January 21, 2013; Committee consideration by United States House Committee on House Administration, United States House Committee on Ways and Means; Passed the House on January 23, 2013 (285-144 Roll Call Vote #30); Passed the Senate on January 31, 2013 (64-34 Recorded Vote 11); Signed into law by President Barack Obama on February 4, 2013

The No Budget, No Pay Act of 2013 (Pub. L. 113–3 (text) (PDF); H.R. 325) is a law passed during the 113th United States Congress. The act temporarily suspended the US debt ceiling from February 4 to May 18, 2013. It also placed temporary restrictions on Congressional salaries.

== Background ==
An earlier version of the No Budget, No Pay Act (unrelated to the debt ceiling) was originally introduced in early 2012 by Jim Cooper, a Democratic congressman from Tennessee. It stipulated that congressmen in the United States Congress would not get paid unless they passed a budget by October 1, 2012.

The bill received limited bipartisan support. However, some members of Congress on both sides of the aisle opposed the bill, stating it would have likely violated the 27th Amendment to the United States Constitution, which states "No law, varying the compensation for the services of the Senators and Representatives, shall take effect, until an election of Representatives shall have intervened."

It was considered dead until mid-January 2013 when Republican lawmakers came up with the idea of combining sections of this bill with a debt ceiling increase; Democratic lawmakers eventually accepted the compromise.

== Provisions/Elements of the bill ==
This summary is based largely on the summary provided by the Congressional Research Service, a public domain source.

The No Budget, No Pay Act of 2013, signed into law on February 4, 2013, suspended the public debt ceiling in the United States until May 18, 2013. The public debt limit at the start of the suspension period was $16.394 trillion.

The act made a special rule relating to debt issued during the suspension period. It revised the discretionary increase in the public debt limit by the United States Secretary of the Treasury, under current law, subject to a congressional resolution of disapproval, upon submission to United States Congress of required presidential certifications that the debt subject to limit is within $100 billion of the limit and further borrowing is required to meet existing commitments.

The act substituted for this discretionary increase, effective May 19, 2013, an automatic increase in the public debt limit, but only to the extent that: (1) the face amount of debt issued and the face amount of debt whose principal and interest are guaranteed by the federal government (except guaranteed obligations held by the Secretary of the Treasury) outstanding on May 19, 2013, exceeds (2) the face amount of such debt at the start of the suspension period.

The act prohibits a debt from being taken into account unless its issuance was necessary to fund a commitment incurred by the federal government that required payment before May 19, 2013.

Finally, the act requires the appropriate payroll administrator of each house of Congress to deposit in an escrow account all mandatory payments for compensation of Members of Congress serving in that house if by April 15, 2013, that house has not agreed to a concurrent budget resolution for FY2014. It then requires release to those Members of such payments after April 16, 2013, only upon the earlier of: (1) the day on which that house agrees to a concurrent budget resolution for FY2014, or (2) the last day of the 113th Congress.

This summary was written by the bill's sponsor, Rep. Dave Camp.

This legislation directs members of the House and Senate to adopt a budget resolution by April 15, 2013. If either body does not, members of that body will have their pay withheld until they pass a budget. It’s simple: no budget, no pay. The American people understand that they don’t get paid if they don’t do their job, and neither should Members of Congress.

In addition, to ensure the complete and timely payment of the obligations of the U.S. Government, this legislation allows Treasury to issue debt between the date of enactment and May 18, 2013. However, Treasury may only issue enough debt necessary to pay bills coming due before May 18. I want to be perfectly clear on this point: this bill does not allow Treasury to run up an unlimited amount of debt between now and May 18. The debt authorized under this bill must be tied to bills coming due during that time frame. Further, on May 19, a new debt limit is automatically established.

The Senate passed the FY2014 budget on March 23, 2013, 23 days before the deadline set by the No Budget, No Pay Act of 2013. This was the first Senate budget passage since a FY2010 budget passed on April 29, 2009. (No Senate budget was passed for FY2011, FY2012, or FY2013.)

=== Congressional Budget Office report ===
H.R. 325 would temporarily suspend the debt limit by the Treasury until May 18, 2013. On the following day, the current debt limit of $16.394 trillion would be raised by the amount of borrowing above that level during the period in which the limitation was suspended.

The act also provided an incentive for action on a concurrent resolution on the budget. If a version of such a resolution has not been passed by a House of the Congress by April 15, 2013, the salaries of members of that chamber would be put in an escrow account. The escrow account for a given house would remain in place until a concurrent resolution on the budget was passed for fiscal year 2014 by that chamber, or until the last day of the 113th Congress, whichever was earlier.

== Procedural history ==
=== House ===
The act was introduced into the House of Representatives by Rep. Dave Camp (R-MI) on January 21, 2013. The bill was referred to the Committee on House Administration and the House Committee on Ways and Means. The House voted to pass the bill on January 23, 2013, by 285–144 in Roll Call Vote #30.

=== Senate ===
The act was received in the Senate on January 24, 2013. It passed the Senate on January 31, 2013, by a vote of 64–34 in Recorded Vote 11.

=== Presidential signature ===
President Barack Obama signed the act into law on February 4, 2013.

== Constitutionality ==
The act implicates constitutional concerns, because the Twenty-seventh Amendment provides that Congress may not "vary" the compensation of senators and representatives until there has been an intervening election. The act would withhold the pay of legislators only temporarily (pending passage of a budget), rather than permanently; commentators differ on whether this is permissible under the Twenty-seventh Amendment. The Supreme Court has never addressed the issue.

== See also ==
- List of bills in the 113th United States Congress
- National debt of the United States
- 2013 United States debt-ceiling debate
- United States budget process
