= United States debt ceiling =

Limit on the amount of debt the U.S. can owe

In the United States, the debt ceiling is a law limiting the total amount of money the federal government can borrow. Since 2025, the debt ceiling is $41.1 trillion after being raised by $5 trillion through the "One Big Beautiful Bill Act" (OBBBA). The debt ceiling is expected to breach by 2027. The U.S. government has borrowed to finance its budget since 2002, running a structural budget deficit. The ceiling does not directly limit the size of the budget deficit but rather the total national debt the U.S. is able to borrow. The debt ceiling is an aggregate figure that applies to gross debt, which includes debt in the hands of the public and intra-government accounts.

The debt ceiling was enacted in 1917 to control government borrowing. There is debate about whether the debt ceiling is constitutional with scholars questioning its legal authority and mechanisms to repay its debt. When the debt ceiling is approached or hit, the U.S. Treasury must resort to "extraordinary measures" to temporarily finance government expenditures and obligations. A debt ceiling breach and protracted default could trigger a widespread financial crisis and put the American economy into a recession. Due to the systematic importance of the debt ceiling, its abolition has been called for across the political spectrum since the 21st century.

== Background ==
Under Article I Section 8 of the United States Constitution, only Congress can authorize the borrowing of money on the credit of the United States. From the founding of the U.S. until 1917, Congress directly authorized each debt issued. To provide more flexibility to finance the United States' involvement in World War I, Congress modified the method by which it authorized debt in the Second Liberty Bond Act of 1917. Under this Act, Congress established an aggregate limit, or "ceiling," on the total amount of new bonds that could be issued.

The present debt ceiling is an aggregate limit applied to nearly all federal debt, which was substantially established by the Public Debt Acts of 1939 and 1941. These acts have been amended subsequently to change the ceiling amount.

From time to time, political disputes arise when the Treasury advises Congress that the debt ceiling is about to be reached and indicates that a default is imminent. When the debt ceiling is reached, and pending an increase in the limit, Treasury may resort to "extraordinary measures" to buy more time before the ceiling can be raised by Congress. The U.S. is claimed to have never reached the point of default where the Treasury was incapable of paying U.S. debt obligations. Exceptions include a three-month period during the War of 1812 when parts of Washington D.C. including the Treasury were burned and a processing error in 1979.

In 2011, the U.S. reached a crisis point of near default on public debt. The delay in raising the debt ceiling resulted in the first downgrade in the United States credit rating, a sharp drop in the stock market, and an increase in borrowing costs. Congress raised the debt limit with the Budget Control Act of 2011, which added to the fiscal cliff when the new ceiling was reached on December 31, 2012.

== Relationship to federal budget ==
The process of setting the debt ceiling is separate and distinct from the United States budget process, and raising the debt ceiling neither directly increases nor decreases the budget deficit, and vice versa. The Government Accountability Office explains, "the debt limit does not control or limit the ability of the federal government to run deficits or incur obligations. Rather, it is a limit on the ability to pay obligations already incurred."

The President formulates a federal budget every year, which Congress must pass, sometimes with amendments, in a concurrent resolution, which does not require the President's signature and is not binding. The budget details projected tax collections and expenditures and, therefore, specifies the estimated amount of borrowing the government would have to do in that fiscal year.

=== Debt not covered by ceiling ===
In December 2012, the Treasury calculated that $239 million in United States Notes were in circulation, which in accordance with the debt ceiling legislation, are excluded from the statutory debt limit. The $239 million excludes $25 million in U.S. Notes issued prior to July 1, 1929, determined pursuant to Act of June 30, 1961, 31 U.S.C. 5119, to have been destroyed or irretrievably lost.

Debts of the Federal Financing Bank are not debts of the government per se and therefore are also not subject to the ceiling, but have a separate limit of $15 billion.

== Legislative history ==
Before 1917, the U.S. had no debt ceiling. Congress either authorized specific loans or allowed the Treasury to issue certain debt instruments and individual debt issues for specific purposes. Sometimes Congress gave the Treasury discretion over what type of debt instrument would be issued. The United States first instituted a statutory debt limit with the Second Liberty Bond Act of 1917. This legislation set limits on the aggregate amount of debt that could be accumulated through individual categories of debt (such as bonds and bills). In 1939, Congress instituted the first limit on total accumulated debt over all kinds of instruments.

In 1953, the U.S. Treasury risked reaching the debt ceiling of $275 billion. Though President Eisenhower requested that Congress increase it on July 30, 1953, the Senate refused to act on it. As a result, the president asked federal agencies to reduce how much they spent, plus the Treasury Department used its cash balances with banks to stay under the debt ceiling. And, starting in November 1953, Treasury monetized close to $1 billion of gold left over in its vaults, which helped keep it from exceeding the $275 billion limit. During spring and summer 1954, the Senate and the executive branch negotiated on a debt ceiling increase, and a $6 billion one was passed on August 28, 1954.

Before the Budget and Impoundment Control Act of 1974, the debt ceiling played an important role in enabling Congress to hold hearings and debates on the budget. James Surowiecki argued that the debt ceiling lost its usefulness after these reforms to the budget process.

In 1979, noting the potential problems of hitting a default, Dick Gephardt imposed the "Gephardt Rule," a parliamentary rule that deemed the debt ceiling was raised when a budget was passed. This resolved the contradiction in voting for appropriations but not voting to fund them. The rule stood until it was repealed by the Republican-controlled Congress in 1995.

A vote to increase the debt ceiling has usually been (since the 1950s) a legal budgetary formality between the President and Congress. As of 1993 the debt ceiling had not historically been a political issue that would make the elected government fail to pass a yearly budget.

=== Ronald Reagan and George H. W. Bush ===
Under the two terms of President Ronald Reagan, the House was controlled by Democrats, and the Senate was, at various points, under the control of both parties. Early in his term, Reagan faced some bipartisan resistance from Congress for a 1981 raising of the debt limit. But Democrats, using the Gephardt Rule, joined with Republicans to increase the debt ceiling eighteen separate times.

Under President George H.W. Bush, Democrats controlled both the House and Senate. Again using the Gephardt Rule, Congress increased the debt ceiling nine times without controversy.

=== Bill Clinton ===
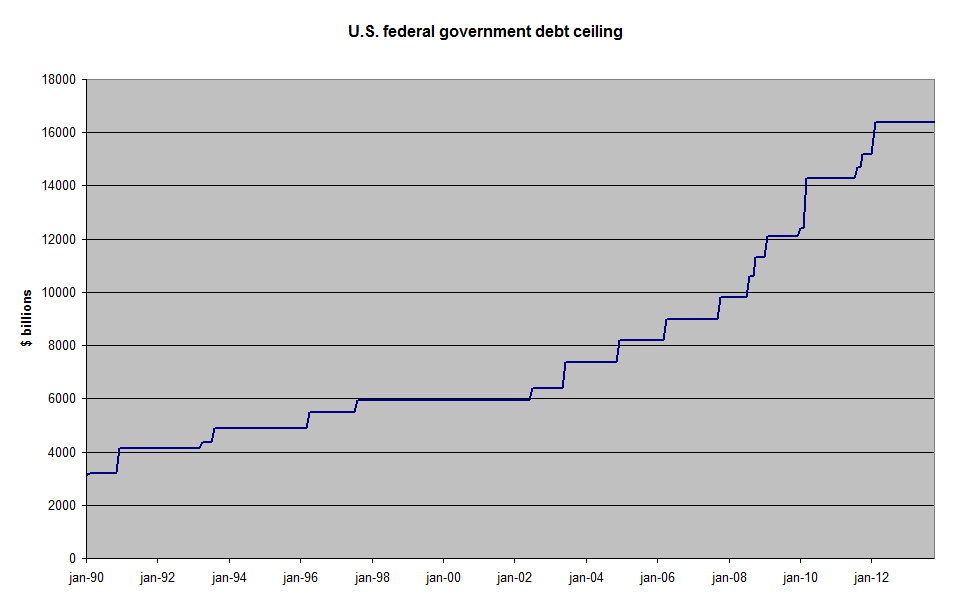
U.S. federal government debt ceiling from 1990 to January 2012 (unadjusted for GDP and population)

The debt-ceiling debate of 1995 led to a showdown on the federal budget and resulted in the U.S. federal government shutdowns of 1995 and 1996. In all, Congress raised the debt ceiling eight times during the Clinton Administration.

=== George W. Bush ===
While George W. Bush was President, both Republicans and Democrats controlled the House and the Senate at various points during his term. Congress increased the debt ceiling eight times in 2002, 2003, 2004, 2006, 2007, and twice in 2008.

When Republicans were in the majority, they consistently voted to increase the debt ceiling. While some Democrats did vote against the debt ceiling when the process was controlled by a Republican majority, Democrats did not filibuster debt limit increases in 2003, 2004 and 2006, allowing Senate Republicans to raise the debt limit with a simple majority.

When Democrats controlled the House and the Senate in the last two years of George W. Bush's term, Democratic majorities in the House and the Senate reinstated the automatic Gephardt Rule and increased the debt ceiling three times without attaching preconditions.

=== Barack Obama ===
In 2011, Republicans took control of Congress and again suspended the Gephardt Rule as they had under Clinton. The Republican majority in Congress demanded deficit reduction as part of raising the debt ceiling. The resulting contention was resolved on August 2, 2011, by the Budget Control Act of 2011. Under the "McConnell Rule," the president was allowed to unilaterally raise the debt ceiling. This action could be overturned by an act of Congress, but this would require a 2/3 majority vote in both houses assuming that the president vetoed the act.

On August 5, 2011, Standard & Poors issued the first ever downgrade in the federal government's credit rating, citing their April warnings, the difficulty of bridging the parties and that the resulting agreement fell well short of the hoped-for comprehensive 'grand bargain'. The credit downgrade and debt ceiling debacle contributed to the Dow Jones Industrial Average (DJIA) falling nearly 2,000 points in late July and August. Following the downgrade itself, the DJIA had one of its worst days in history and fell 635 points on August 8.

Following the increase in the debt ceiling to $16.394 trillion in 2011, the U.S. again reached the debt ceiling on December 31, 2012, and the Treasury began taking extraordinary measures, which were expected to be exhausted by February 15. The fiscal cliff was resolved with the passage of the American Taxpayer Relief Act of 2012 (ATRA), but no action was taken on the debt ceiling. Following the tax cuts from ATRA, the government needed to raise the debt ceiling by $700 billion to finance operations for the rest of the 2013 fiscal year. The Treasury said it was not set up to prioritize payments and had given the opinion that it is unclear whether it would be legal to do so. Given this situation, the Treasury would simply delay payments if funds could not be raised through extraordinary measures and the debt ceiling was not raised. Economists estimated that such an action would cause GDP to contract by 7 percent, which is larger than the contraction during the Great Recession. The economic damage would worsen as recipients of social security benefits, government contracts, and other government payments cut back on spending in response to the freeze in their revenue.

The 2013 crisis was temporarily resolved on February 4, 2013, when President Barack Obama signed the No Budget, No Pay Act of 2013 which suspended the debt ceiling until May 19, 2013. On May 19, the debt ceiling was raised to approximately $16.699 trillion to accommodate the borrowing done during the suspension period. During the suspension period, the Treasury was authorized to borrow to the extent that it "is required to meet existing commitments". On May 19, the debt ceiling was raised by $306 billion to cover the borrowings done during the suspension period, as well as commitments that accrued in the preceding period that extraordinary measures were in place, which commenced on December 31, 2012.

Treasury Secretary Jack Lew notified Congress that these measures would be exhausted by October 17, 2013 and that a default would occur on October 17 when interest payments came due. From October 17, 2013 until February 7, 2014, the debt ceiling was again suspended. On February 12, 2014, the Temporary Debt Limit Extension Act was passed, suspending the debt ceiling until March 15, 2015. At that time, the Treasury Department took extraordinary measures.

The debt ceiling would again have been reached on November 3, 2015. But on October 30, 2015, the debt ceiling was suspended to March 2017.

=== Donald Trump's first term ===
When Donald Trump was President, the debt ceiling was subject to less partisan controversy. The administration and the Republicans who controlled the House and the Senate prioritized tax cuts over a balanced budget.

The ceiling was suspended three times: from September 30, 2017, to December 8, 2017; from December 8, 2017 to March 1, 2019; and, after concerns were raised from Treasury in July 2019 of an unexpected shortfall due to reduced tax receipts under Trump's tax legislation, from August 2, 2019 to July 31, 2021. The debt ceiling was raised when it was increased by $2.5 trillion, to $31.38 trillion, which lasted until January 2023. After the 2024 United States presidential election, Donald Trump supported eliminating the debt ceiling.

Congress did not impose any preconditions or significant spending cuts. Democrats in the Senate could have threatened to stop the debt ceiling increase by use of the filibuster but declined to do so.

=== Joe Biden ===
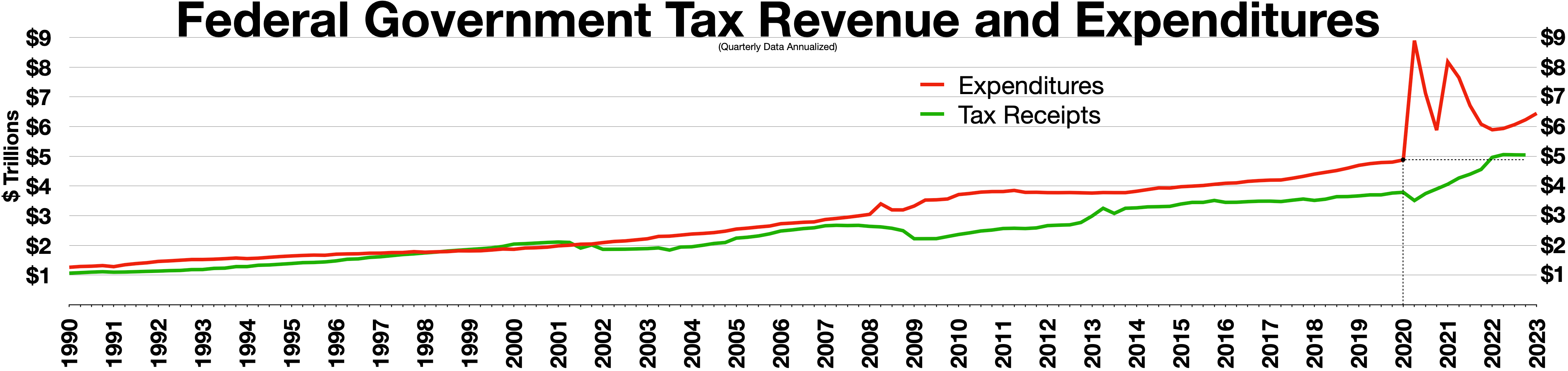
Federal Government tax revenue and expenditures. Federal Government expenditures Federal Government tax receipts Pre-pandemic spending levels comparison

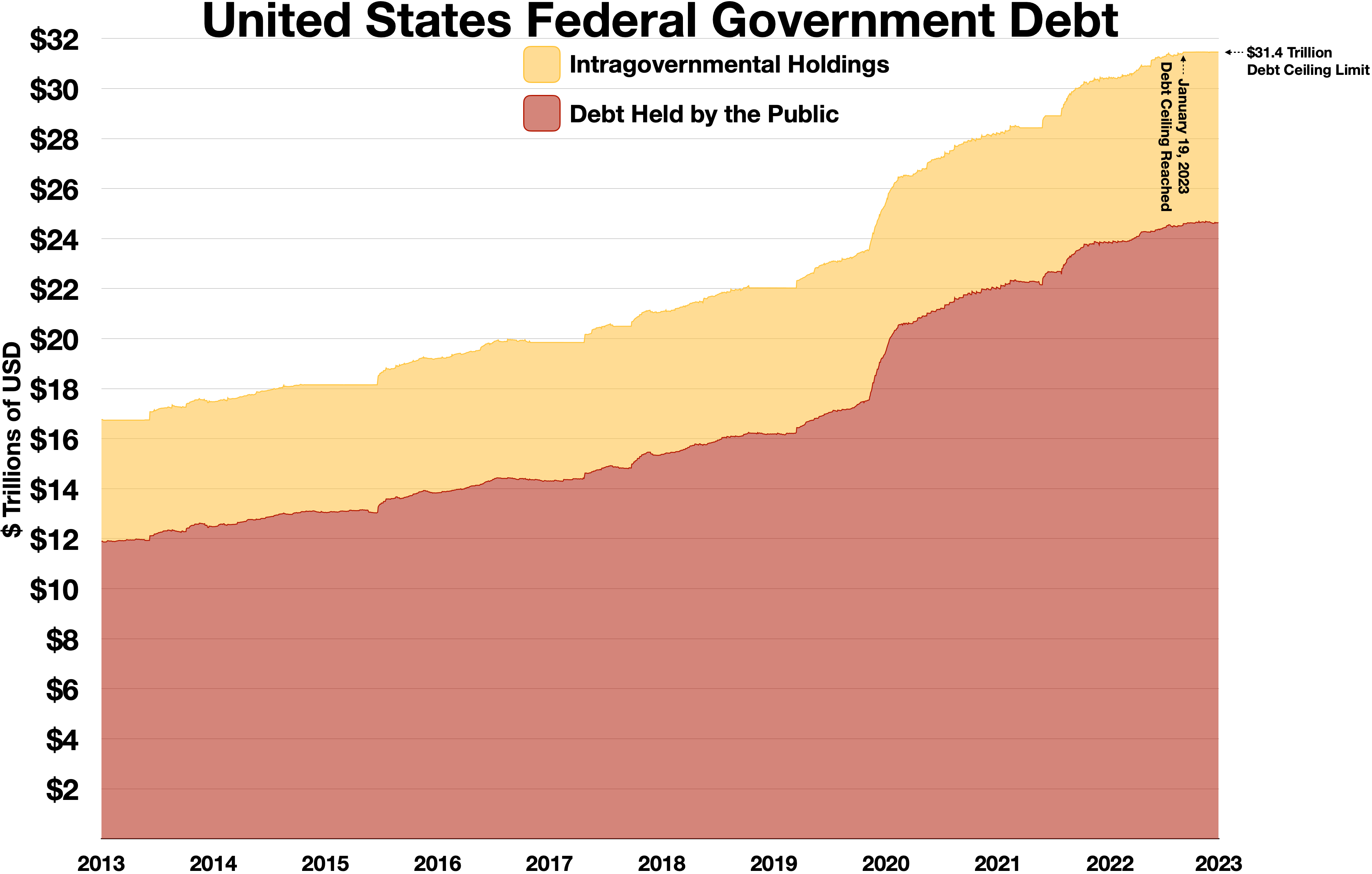
United States Federal Government debt Intragovernmental holdings Debt held by the public $31.4 Trillion debt ceiling limit Reached on January 19, 2023

During Biden's first two years as president, the House and Senate were both controlled by the Democratic Party. In October 2021, the debt ceiling was increased by $480 billion, as a temporary measure requiring fresh legislation by December 3, 2021. That month, Congress voted to increase it by $2.5 trillion, which President Biden signed into effect on December 16, 2021. At that point, it was set at about $31.4 trillion.

On January 19, 2023, the United States hit its debt ceiling of $31.4 trillion. At this time, Republicans had taken control of the House during the 2022 midterm elections. Although Republicans were a minority in the Senate, they threatened for the first time in American history to use the filibuster to stop the debt ceiling increase. On June 3, 2023, the debt ceiling was suspended when U.S. president Joe Biden signed the Fiscal Responsibility Act of 2023 into law. This ended the debt-ceiling crisis that began on January 19, 2023; the debt ceiling suspension remained in effect until December 31, 2024.

=== Donald Trump's second term ===
Following his second election in November 2024, Donald Trump called for the abolition of the debt ceiling. The debt ceiling was raised by $5 trillion with the passage of the One Big Beautiful Bill Act.

== Extraordinary measures ==
The Treasury Department is permitted to borrow funds needed to fund government operations, as had been authorized by congressional appropriations, up to the debt ceiling, with some small exceptions. In a letter to Congress on April 4, 2011, Treasury Secretary Timothy Geithner explained that when the debt ceiling is reached, the Treasury can declare a "debt issuance suspension period" during which it can take "extraordinary measures" to continue meeting federal obligations provided that it does not involve the issue of new debt. These measures are taken to avoid, as far as resources permit, a partial government shutdown or a default on the debt. These methods have been used on several previous occasions in which federal debt neared its statutory limit.

Extraordinary measures can include suspending investments in the G Fund of the Thrift Savings Plan of individual retirement funds of federal employees. In 2011, extraordinary measures included suspending investments in the Civil Service Retirement and Disability Fund (CSRDF), the Postal Service Retiree Health Benefits Fund (Postal Benefits Fund), and the Exchange Stabilization Fund (ESF). In addition, certain CSRDF investments were also redeemed early. In 1985, the Treasury had also exchanged Treasury securities for non-Treasury securities held by the Federal Financing Bank.

However, these amounts are not sufficient to cover government operations for extended periods. Treasury first implemented these measures on December 16, 2009, to avoid a government shutdown. These measures were implemented again on May 16, 2011, when Treasury Secretary Geithner declared a "debt issuance suspension period". According to his letter to Congress, this period could "last until August 2, 2011, when the Department of the Treasury projects that the borrowing authority of the United States will be exhausted".

The measures were again implemented on December 31, 2012, the start of the debt ceiling crisis of 2013 with the default trigger date ticking to February 2013. The crisis was deferred with the suspension of the limit on February 4, and the cancellation of the extraordinary measures. The measures were again invoked at the end of the ceiling's suspension on May 19, 2013, with the date of exhaustion of the resources and the default trigger date being estimated by the Treasury as October 17. The ceiling was again suspended until February 7, 2014.

== Default on financial obligations ==
According to the text of the debt ceiling law, if the debt ceiling is not raised and extraordinary measures are exhausted, the U.S. government is legally unable to borrow money to pay its financial obligations. At that point, the law indicates that the government must cease making payments unless the treasury has cash on hand to cover them. In addition, the law indicates that the government would not have the resources to pay the interest on (and some time redeem) government securities when due, which would be characterized as a default. A default may affect the United States' sovereign risk rating and the interest rate that it will be required to pay on future debt.

As of 2012, the U.S. defaulted on its financial obligations once in 1979, due to a computer backlog, but the periodic crises relating to the debt ceiling have led several rating agencies to United States federal government credit-rating downgrades. As of 2012, the GAO estimated that the delay in raising the debt ceiling during the debt ceiling crisis of 2011 raised borrowing costs for the government by $1.3 billion in the fiscal year 2011 and noted that the delay would also raise costs in later years. The Bipartisan Policy Center extended the GAO's estimates and found that the delay raised borrowing costs by $18.9 billion over ten years.

As of 2012, some writers expressed the view that if extraordinary measures are exhausted, the executive branch has the authority to determine which obligations are paid and which are not, though the Treasury has argued that all obligations are on equal footing under the law. The writers have argued that the executive branch can choose to prioritize interest payments on bonds, which would avoid an immediate, direct default on sovereign debt. During the debt ceiling crisis of 2011, Treasury Secretary Timothy Geitner argued that prioritization of interest payments would not help since government expenditures would have needed to be cut by an unrealistic 40% if the debt ceiling is not raised. Also, a default on non-debt obligations would still undermine American creditworthiness according to at least one rating agency. In 2011, the Treasury suggested that it could not prioritize certain types of expenditures because all expenditures are on equal footing under the law. In this view, when extraordinary measures are exhausted, no payments could be made except when money (such as tax receipts) is in the treasury, at all and the U.S. would be in default on all of its obligations. The CBO notes, that prioritization would not avoid the technical definition found in Black's Law Dictionary where default is defined as "the failure to make a payment when due."

Many scholars argue that debt ceiling law is unconstitutional and there is no legal basis by which the U.S. government may default on any of its debt. They point to Section Four of the 14th Amendment of the United States Constitution, which states that "the validity of the public debt of the United States...shall not be questioned." They argue that it was unconstitutional for the U.S. Congress to pass the debt ceiling law in the first place, since the law does not provide a clear way for the U.S. to pay its debts and implicitly requires a default. Harvard University legal scholar Laurence Tribe argues that "using the ceiling to make us default on our debts clearly would be unconstitutional." This argument has also been endorsed by various politicians, including President Bill Clinton, former labor secretary Robert Reich, Representative Jerry Nadler, and Representative James Clyburn.

In 2023, a group of lawmakers from the Senate and House of Representatives sent a letter to President Biden encouraging him to consider invoking the 14th Amendment to pay government debts. However, there are scholars who argue that even if the law itself is unconstitutional, that determination must be made by the courts and the President does not have the authority to unilaterally ignore the debt ceiling law. In practice, the administrations of Presidents Barack Obama and Joe Biden have rejected relying on legal arguments against the constitutionality of the debt ceiling. Obama said in 2011 that his lawyers "were not persuaded that that is a winning argument." In 2023, Joe Biden's Treasury Secretary Janet Yellen called this strategy "legally questionable", with Biden saying "I think we have the authority" to invoke the 14th Amendment to pay government debts, suggesting that he would explore this question in the future, but he questioned the practicality of relying on this approach to defuse a debt ceiling standoff.

In May 2023, the National Association of Government Employees filed a lawsuit in federal court alleging that the debt ceiling law is unconstitutional. On October 18, 2023, the case was dismissed as moot after the passing of the Fiscal Responsibility Act of 2023 (which suspended the debt ceiling) with the court also reasoning that alleged future harms were too speculative. The First Circuit affirmed the judgement on November 1, 2024.

== Debate on debt ceiling ==
Reports to Congress from the OMB and other sources in the 1990s have repeatedly stated that the debt limit is an ineffective means to restrain the growth of debt.

In 2011, James Surowiecki argued that the debt ceiling originally served a useful purpose. When introduced, presidents had stronger authority to borrow and spend as they pleased. However, after 1974 the Congress began passing comprehensive budget resolutions which specified exactly how much money the government could spend.

The apparent redundancy of the debt ceiling has led to suggestions that it should be abolished altogether. Several Democratic House members, including Peter Welch, proposed abolishing the debt ceiling. The proposal found support from some economists such as Jacob Funk Kirkegaard, a senior fellow at the Peterson Institute for International Economics.

In January 2013, a survey of 38 economists found that 84 percent agreed that, since Congress already approves spending and taxation, "a separate debt ceiling that has to be increased periodically creates unneeded uncertainty and can potentially lead to worse fiscal outcomes." Only one member of the panel, Luigi Zingales, disagreed with the statement. Rating agency Moody's has stated that "the debt limit creates a high level of uncertainty" and that the government should change "its framework for managing government debt to lessen or eliminate that uncertainty".

In 2021, the U.S. debt ceiling has been described as "anachronistic", with the two major parties criticized for utilizing the debt ceiling to play a dangerous game of chicken for purely partisan political purposes.

Some scholars argue that the debt ceiling does not provide the legal authority for the United States to default on its debt. Some also argue that the debt ceiling itself is unconstitutional since it does not provide a clear mechanism for the government to meet its constitutional obligation to repay its debts once it meets the borrowing limit.

=== Modern Monetary Theory ===
Proponents of Modern Monetary Theory (MMT), a heterodox, post-Keynesian economic theory which arose in the late 20th century, have critiqued the concept of the debt ceiling and its theoretical and practical uses. A core tenet of MMT is that currency arose from and is wholly controlled as fiat money by governments, the latter claim is dependent on the government as the sovereign issuer of the given currency. As of 2019, MMT theorists believed that governments have the power to create and spend money within a limit of reason without creating hyperinflation, as well as the ability to forgive its debt or repay itself; in contrast, as of 2020, orthodox economic theorists tended to focus on national deficit as a debt that needs to be repaid eventually. As a result, MMT theorists argue the debt ceiling is largely a symbolic limit on government spending; in 2020 Stephanie Kelton, a prominent supporter of MMT, wrote that "there are no constraints on the federal budget."

After the turn of the 20th century, and particularly during and since the Great Recession (2007-2009) political landscape, MMT has been the subject of political debate between post-Keynesian, mainstream, and free-market economic theorists and politicians alike. As of 2019, MMT debates on the debt ceiling have pervaded Congress, with progressive representatives, prominently Alexandria Ocasio-Cortez, boosting the theory to the mainstream, while conservative representatives have been critiquing MMT's potential impacts on government spending and inflation.

Early in 2023, Treasury Secretary Janet Yellen was supportive of legislation to abolish the debt limit, while President Biden was not; however, by June he had signed into law the Fiscal Responsibility Act of 2023 suspending the debt ceiling.

== Sources ==
- "Amerikanere kan lære af dansk gældsloft" (in Danish). DR Nyheder. August 3, 2011.
- "Analysis of 2011-2012 Actions Taken and Effect of Delayed Increase on Borrowing Costs" (PDF). GAO. July 2012.
- Austin, D. Andrew (August 9, 2017). The Debt Limit Since 2011 (PDF). Washington, DC: Congressional Research Service.
- Murray, Justin (November 6, 2017). Votes on Measures to Adjust the Statutory Debt Limit, 1978 to Present (PDF). Washington, DC: Congressional Research Service.
- "Federal Debt and the Statutory Limit, November 2012" (PDF). Congressional Budget Office. November 2012.
- "Delays Create Debt Management Challenges and Increase Uncertainty in the Treasury Market" (PDF). GAO-11-203. GAO. February 2011.
- Green, Joshua (May 9, 2011). "How Dick Gephardt Fixed the Debt-Ceiling Problem". The Atlantic.
- Kowalcky, Linda W.; LeLoup, Lance T. (1993). "Congress and the Politics of Statutory Debt Limitation". Public Administration Review. 53 (1): 14. doi:10.2307/977272. JSTOR 977272.
- Lawder, David (June 29, 2011). "Prioritizing debt payments won't work: Geithner". Reuters.
- Levit, Mandy R.; Brass, Clinton T.; Nicola, Timothy J.; Nuschler, Dawn (January 4, 2013). "Reaching the Debt Limit: Background and Potential Effects on Government Operations" (PDF). Archived from the original (PDF) on January 23, 2013.
- Masters, Jonathan. "U.S. Debt Ceiling: Costs and Consequences". Renewing America. Council on Foreign Relations. Archived from the original on September 8, 2013.
- Sahadi, Jeanne (January 7, 2013). "Debt Ceiling: 'Chaotic' choices on 100 million payments". CNNMoney. Archived from the original on January 9, 2013.
- Sahadi, Jeanne (May 17, 2013). "Debt ceiling: Treasury starts juggling act". CNNMoney. Archived from the original on June 7, 2013.
- Surowiecki, James (August 1, 2011). "Smash the Ceiling". The New Yorker.
- Sweet, Ken (August 8, 2011). "Dow plunges after S&P downgrade". CNNMoney. Archived from the original on August 8, 2011.
- Yglesias, Matthew (January 16, 2013). "What if Congress Doesn't Raise the Debt Ceiling?". Slate.
