= Dagong Global Credit Rating =

Chinese state-owned credit rating agency

Dagong Global Credit Rating Co.
- Type: State-owned enterprise
- Industry: Financial services
- Founded: 1994
- Headquarters: Beijing, China
- Owner: China Reform Holdings Corporation
- Website: dagongcredit.com

Dagong Global Credit Rating (Chinese: 大公国际资信评估有限公司; pinyin: Dàgōng Guójì Zīxìn Pínggū Yǒuxiàn Gōngsī) is a state-owned credit rating agency based in China.

== History ==
The company was established in 1994, following approval by the People's Bank of China and the State Economic and Trade Division of the People's Republic of China.

In May 2009, an agreement of mutual cooperation was signed with Xinhua News Agency, reported as "promoting a national credit rating system". The company stated that it has used "dialectical materialism" as part of its evaluative approach.

In June 2013, Dagong Europe Credit Rating was registered and received authorisation from the European Securities and Markets Authority as Credit Rating Agency. In the same year, it was recognised by the Joint Committee of the three European Supervisory Authorities (EBA, ESMA and EIOPA) as External Credit Assessment Institution operating in the European Union. It was led by Mauro Alfonso until February 2014.

== Regulatory Actions ==
In 2018, Dagong's operations were suspended following accusations of corruption and doctored ratings in exchange for fees. In 2019, Dagong was nationalized with China Reform Holdings Corporation acquiring a 58% stake as part of the rectification process.

December 15, 2020: The Beijing Regulatory Bureau of the China Securities Regulatory Commission (CSRC) took the regulatory measure of issuing a warning letter. The reasons were that in some projects, the reasons for adjusting the qualitative indicators of the rating model were insufficient or inconsistent, some important factors affecting the debt - paying ability of the rated entities were not analyzed as necessary, and when re - evaluating individual projects, the qualitative indicators were scored up without relevant basis, directly causing the model result to rise by one subset.

February 7, 2021: The Shandong Regulatory Bureau of the CSRC took the regulatory measure of issuing a warning letter. During the rating process of the corporate bonds "16 Great Wall 01" and "16 Great Wall 02", Dagong Global did not fully verify the authenticity, accuracy, and completeness of some of the documents and materials on which the relevant credit rating reports were based. The completion time of the first - draft rating report for "16 Great Wall 02" did not meet the requirements of the "Implementation Rules for the Rating Business of Securities Market Credit Rating Agencies (for Trial Implementation)".

June 3, 2021: The Business Management Department of the People's Bank of China gave a warning to Dagong Global and imposed a fine of 14.605 million yuan. The reasons included failure to carry out credit rating business in accordance with legal rating procedures and business rules, violation of independence requirements, failure to file for credit rating practitioners as required, and violation of the consistency principle of rating operations. Lin Songtao, the then secretary of the board of directors and head of the human resources department, was given a warning and fined 130,000 yuan; Han Sheng, the then rating director, was given a warning and fined 40,000 yuan.

July 9, 2021: The Beijing Securities Regulatory Bureau ordered Dagong Global to immediately carry out a comprehensive rectification. There were six violations, including insufficient basis for adjusting the qualitative indicators of the rating model in some projects, lack of adjustment standards for the qualitative indicators of the rating model in some projects, inconsistent reasons for adjusting the qualitative indicators of the rating model in individual projects, failure to conduct necessary analysis of important factors affecting the debt - paying ability of the rated entities in individual projects, increasing the scores of the qualitative indicators of the rating model during the re - evaluation process of individual projects based on reasons other than the re - evaluation application and with insufficient basis, directly affecting the rating model result to rise by one subset, and failure to conduct on - site inspections and interviews as required in individual projects, and missing rating business files.

December 2021: The National Association of Financial Market Institutional Investors (NAFMII) gave a warning to Dagong Global. Due to five violations such as lack of due - diligence procedures, incorrect use of the rating model, and imperfect rating quality control, it was also ordered to conduct a comprehensive and in - depth rectification of the problems. Qian Xiaoyu, the then vice president in charge of ratings and the current rating director, was given a warning.

March 31, 2022: The CSRC ordered Dagong Global to make corrections, confiscated its business income of 1.6509 million yuan, and imposed a fine of 3.3019 million yuan. From 2015 to 2018, when issuing credit rating reports related to corporate bonds and bills for Shandong Shengtong Group Co., Ltd., Dagong Global did not carry out due - diligence work in accordance with relevant rules, did not maintain prudent analysis, did not verify the authenticity, accuracy, and completeness of the documents and materials on which the ratings were based, and had deficiencies in internal audits, resulting in false records in the issued rating reports.

2023: The Beijing Securities Regulatory Bureau ordered Dagong Global to immediately carry out a comprehensive rectification and strictly implement the relevant regulations of the "Measures for the Administration of Securities Market Credit Rating Business". After investigation, Dagong Global had six violations, including insufficient basis for adjusting the qualitative indicators of the rating model in some projects and lack of adjustment standards for the qualitative indicators of the rating model in some projects. The administrative regulatory measure of ordering corrections was decided to be taken against Dagong Global.

== See also ==
- List of countries by credit rating
- Dagong Europe Credit Rating
