= 2013 United States federal budget =

U.S. budget from October 1, 2012 to September 30, 2013

2013 Budget of the United States federal government
- Submitted: February 13, 2012
- Submitted by: Barack Obama
- Submitted to: 112th Congress
- Passed: September 28, 2012 (Pub.L. 112-175); March 26, 2013 (Pub.L. 113-6)
- Country: United States
- Total revenue: $2.902 trillion (requested) $2.77 trillion (actual); 16.7% of GDP (actual)
- Total expenditures: $3.803 trillion (requested) $3.45 trillion (actual); 20.8% of GDP (actual)
- Deficit: $901 billion (requested); 5.5% of GDP $680 billion (actual); 4.1% of GDP (actual)
- Debt: $16.72 trillion (at fiscal end); 100.8% of GDP
- GDP: $16.582 trillion
- Website: Office of Management and Budget

The 2013 United States federal budget is the budget to fund government operations for the fiscal year 2013, which began on October 1, 2012, and ended on September 30, 2013. The original spending request was issued by President Barack Obama in February 2012.

The Budget Control Act of 2011 mandates caps on discretionary spending, which under current law will be lowered beginning in January 2013 to remove $1.2 trillion of spending over the following ten years. In addition, several temporary tax cuts were scheduled to expire at the beginning of the 2013 calendar year, including the 2001 and 2003 Bush tax cuts on income, capital gains, and estate tax, which had been extended in a 2010 tax deal, as well as a payroll tax cut that began as a result of the 2010 deal and had been most recently extended in an early 2012 tax deal. The combination of sudden spending cuts and tax increases has led to concerns about significant negative effects on the economy in the wake of the weak recovery from the recession that began in 2007.

The government was initially funded through a single temporary continuing resolution. Final funding for the government was enacted on March 26, 2013, as the Consolidated and Further Continuing Appropriations Act, 2013, which contained funding bills for the Department of Defense and Department of Veterans Affairs, with a full-year continuing resolution for all other departments and agencies.

== Background ==
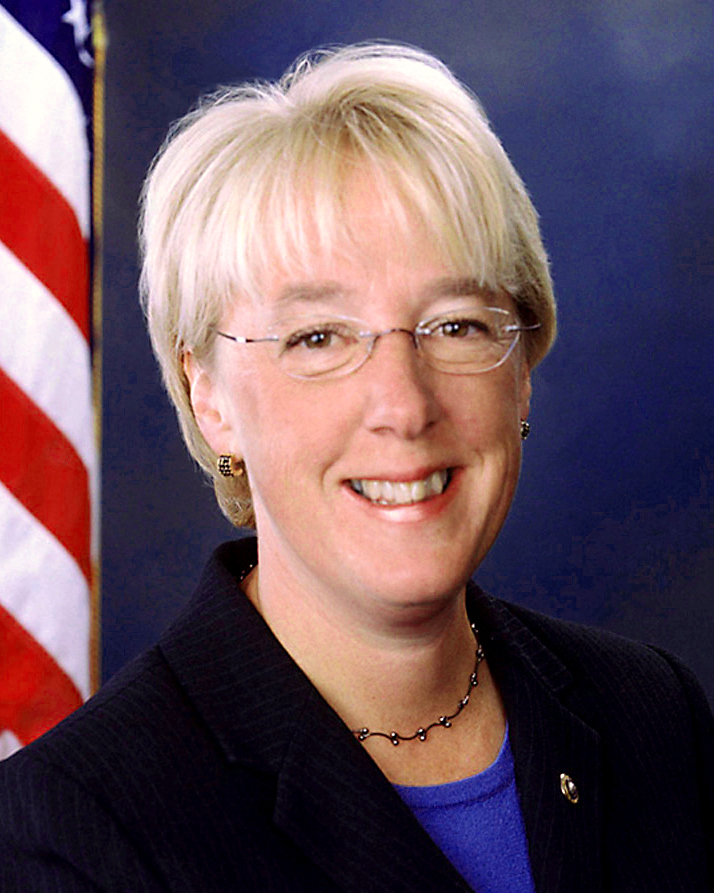
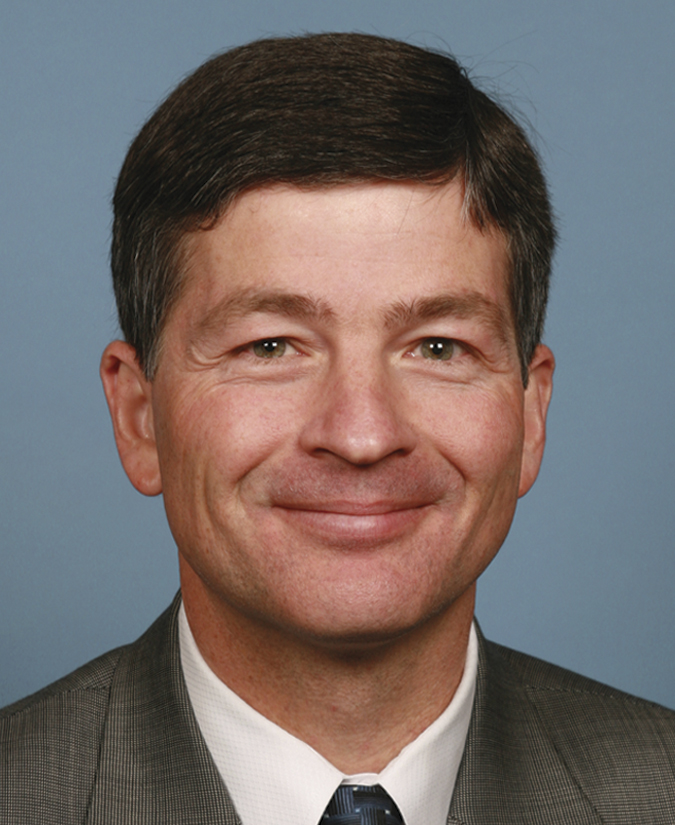
Senator Patty Murray (D-WA) and Representative Jeb Hensarling (R-TX) were co-chairs of a committee set up by the Budget Control Act of 2011 to identify $1.2 trillion in cuts over ten years. The committee failed to agree on any deficit reduction plan, triggering mandatory across-the-board cuts. Hensarling blamed Democratic committee members for insisting on "a minimum of $1 trillion in higher taxes" and unwillingness to agree to "structural reforms" to health-care entitlement programs, while Murray says Republican committee members "insisted that the wealthiest Americans and biggest corporations be protected from paying a penny more" at the expense of the middle class.

The Budget Control Act of 2011 was passed in August 2011 as a resolution to the debt-ceiling crisis. The fiscal year (abbreviated as FY) 2013 budget is the first to be affected by the second of two rounds of budget cuts specified in the act. (The first round of cuts has already been applied to the ten years beginning in FY2012.) For this second round of cuts, the Budget Control Act had formed the United States Congress Joint Select Committee on Deficit Reduction, sometimes referred to as the "supercommittee", to identify at least $1.2 trillion in cuts over the ten years beginning with FY2013, and specified automatic across-the-board cuts of the same amount, equally split between security and non-security programs, if no such budget reduction legislation was passed by Congress.

On November 21, 2011, the Joint Select Committee on Deficit Reduction announced that it did not reach a deal on the budget-cutting legislation, raising the possibility that the automatic cuts would be activated if the full Congress could not enact its own deficit reduction legislation by December 23, 2011. The supercommittee's lack of an agreement was attributed to the refusal of Republicans to consider any tax increases, combined with Democratic insistence on including these revenue increases such as the expiration of the Bush tax cuts, which under current law expire at the end of 2012.

== Budget proposals ==
President Obama's February 2012 budget message to Congress addressed themes of economic crisis and response, an updated defense strategy, taxation fairness, income equality, fiscal responsibility, and investments in education and research to help the U.S. compete economically. He wrote: "The way to rebuild our economy and strengthen the middle class is to make sure that everyone in America gets a fair shot at success. Instead of lowering our standards and our sights, we need to win a race to the top for good jobs that pay well and offer security for the middle class. To succeed and thrive in the global, high-tech economy, we need America to be a place with the highest-skilled, highest-educated workers; the most advanced transportation and communication networks; and the strongest commitment to research and technology in the world. This Budget makes investments that can help America win this race, create good jobs, and lead in the world economy."

Key elements of the President's budget for fiscal year (FY) 2013 included expiration of a variety of tax cuts for couples earning over $250,000 ($200,000 if single), short-term stimulus measures to support job growth, and targeted tax cuts for families and businesses. The budget included 2013 revenues of $2.9 trillion or 17.8% GDP (up from $2.5 trillion or 15.8% GDP in 2012) and spending of $3.8 trillion or 23.3% GDP (similar to the prior year in dollar terms but below the 24.3% GDP in 2012). The projected 2013 deficit was $900 billion (5.5% GDP), down from the 2012 deficit of $1.3 trillion (8.5% GDP).

Over the 2013-2022 period, the budget essentially freezes defense and non-defense discretionary spending in dollar terms, such that these categories shrink relative to a growing economy, from 8.7% GDP to 5.9% GDP. Mandatory spending (e.g., Medicare, Medicaid, Social Security, and other safety net programs) remain around 14% GDP. Net interest rises from 1.5% GDP to 3.3% GDP. Revenues rise steadily during the period from 17.8% GDP to 20.1% GDP, averaging 19.2% GDP. Debt held by the public rises from $12.6 trillion to $18.7 trillion, but remains flat around 77% GDP during the period.

On May 16, 2012, the United States Senate voted on a 52-page budget amendment billed as a summary of the nearly 2,000 pages in the Obama administration's 2013 budget proposal. The amendment was defeated by a unanimous 99–0 vote, which paralleled the House of Representatives having voted a similar rejection in March by a count of 414–0. Those defeats of the amendments marked the second year in a row such summary bills met unanimous opposition. In explaining their votes against, Congressional Democrats disputed whether the Republican summary accurately represented the Obama budget proposal; by contrast, Congressional Republicans claimed that their amendment included ample data taken directly from said budget.

== Legislation ==
On July 31, 2012, a tentative deal was announced to fund the government from October 2012 through March 2013 through a continuing resolution, with spending rates slightly higher than the FY2012 levels. The deal was reached because Republicans were eager to avoid a prolonged dispute that could threaten a government shutdown just before the upcoming 2012 general elections. The bill, the Continuing Appropriations Resolution, 2013, was passed in the House 329–91, passed in the Senate 62–30, and signed by President Obama on September 28, 2012.

On August 1, 2012, the House and Senate passed competing bills on the extension of the Bush tax cuts. The House bill would extend all the tax cuts for one year, while the Senate version would allow taxes to rise on incomes over $250,000. The passage of the bills was reported as being intended as political cover; progress on tax legislation was not expected until after the November elections.

In late December, the Republican House leadership proposed legislation that would allow tax cuts to rise relative to 2012 levels only for annual income over $1,000,000. The proposal was known as "Plan B", and was intended to force the Senate and the Obama administration to pass it and delay further negotiations until the following month, when Republicans were expected to use the reaching of the federal debt limit as leverage. However, the House vote on the plan was abruptly cancelled on December 20, 2012, after it became clear that the bill did not have enough support to pass, due to conservative members of the House who would not support any legislation that would raise taxes without also cutting spending.

On December 28, 2012, the Senate passed the Disaster Relief Appropriations Act, 2013 to provide for $60.4 billion in additional spending to cover recovery costs from Hurricane Sandy, which had hit the northeastern United States in late October. The bill passed the Senate 62–32, but faced uncertain prospects in the House. The bill was not passed by the House before the end of the 112th United States Congress, but it was reintroduced in the 113th United States Congress and became first two acts of that Congress. A bill increasing the borrowing authority of FEMA was enacted on January 6, 2013, and the appropriations bill was enacted on January 29, 2013.

At around 2 a.m. on January 1, 2013, the Senate passed a compromise bill, the American Taxpayer Relief Act of 2012, by a margin of 89–8. The bill would delay the budget sequestration by two months, and bill includes $600 billion over ten years in new tax revenue relative to extending 2012 levels, which is about one-fifth of the revenue that would have been raised had no legislation been passed. The revenue would come from increased marginal income and capital gains tax rates relative to their 2012 levels for annual income over $400,000 for individuals and $450,000 for couples; a phase-out of certain tax deductions and credits for those with incomes over $250,000 for individuals and $300,000 for couples, an increase in estate taxes relative to 2012 levels on estates over $5 million, and expiration of the two-year-old cut to payroll taxes, which is applied to income under the Social Security Wage Base, which was $110,100 in 2012. All these changes would all be made permanent. House Speaker John Boehner promised a prompt vote on the Senate bill, but the prospect of the House passing an amended bill raised the prospect that legislation might not be enacted by the end of the 112th Congress at noon on January 3. The House passed the bill without amendments by a margin of 257–167 at about 11 p. m. EST on January 1, 2013. 85 Republicans and 172 Democrats voted in favor while 151 Republicans and 16 Democrats were opposed.

The spending bill for the remainder of the fiscal year, the Consolidated and Further Continuing Appropriations Act, 2013, was passed by the Senate 73–26 on March 20, 2013, by the House the following day in a 318–109 vote, and signed by President Obama on March 26, 2013. The legislation shifted some money between programs within the previously legislated sequestration caps.

== Analysis ==
=== Implications of the Budget Control Act ===
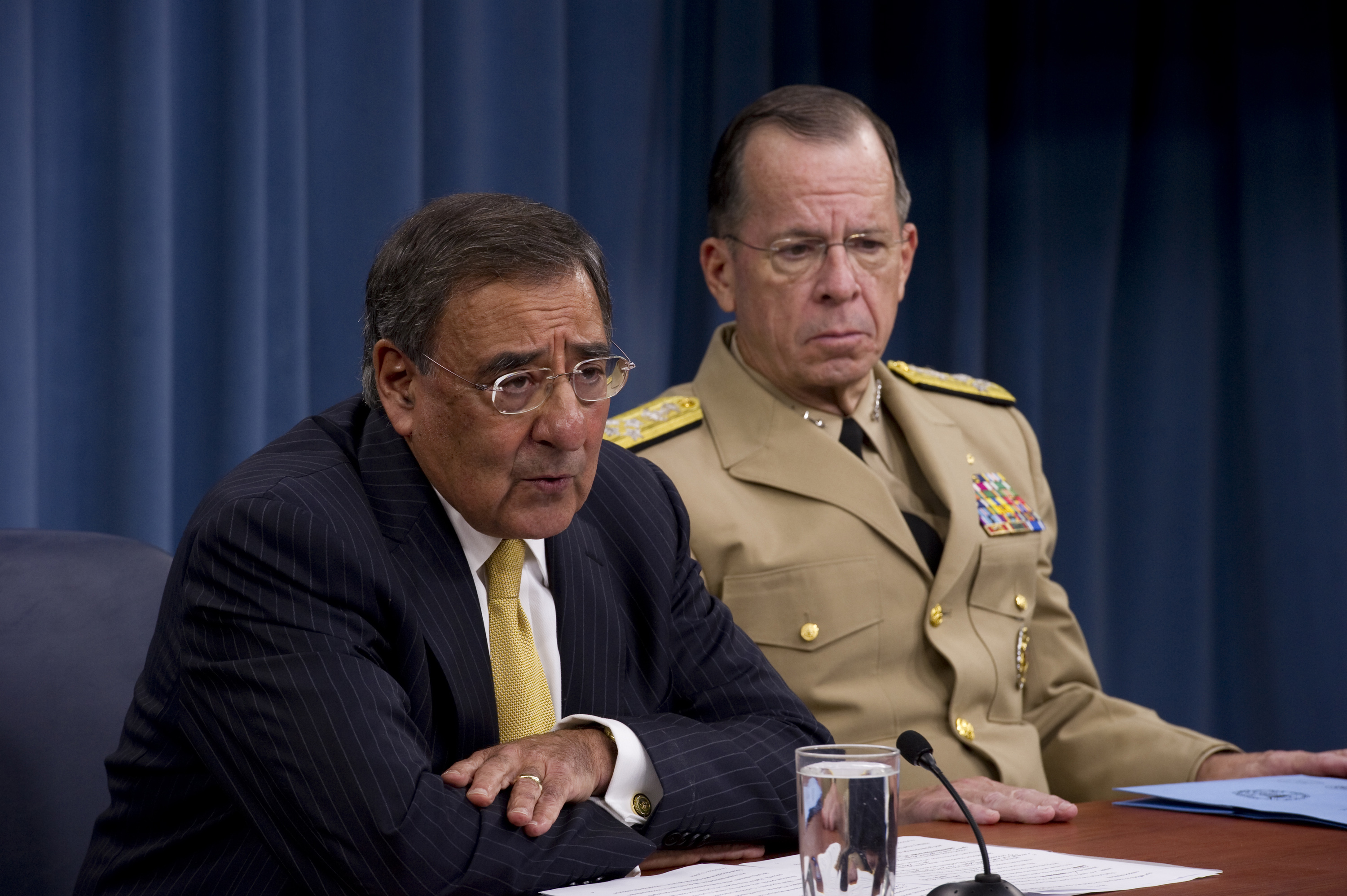
Secretary of Defense Leon Panetta, pictured here with Chairman of the Joint Chiefs of Staff Mike Mullen, estimated that the Budget Control Act would reduce the base military budget by 23% from the funding levels expected by the Defense Department.

The automatic cuts of $1.2 trillion resulting from the absence of a deal from the supercommittee over ten years would be split equally between security and non-security programs, and include $500 billion in cuts to the Department of Defense. The FY2013 defense budget would be reduced 11%, from $525 billion to $472 billion, after already having been cut from $571 billion in the first installment of cuts in the Budget Control Act. Secretary of Defense Leon Panetta initially gave the total cut figure as 23%. The planned cuts include reductions in troop levels, a modest limit in pay raises for soldiers starting in 2015, an increase in health fees for veterans, delays in the construction of new naval ships and in the purchasing of new fighter aircraft such as the F-35, and the possibility of a round of base closings within the United States, but cuts to special operations, cyberwarfare, and intelligence programs were avoided. Initial reports had also suggested that the number of carrier battle groups might be reduced from 11 to 10, although it was later determined that the number of aircraft carriers would not in fact be cut. Some Republicans in Congress advocated reversing the cuts to the military, citing the effect on national security, and Secretary Panetta has opposed the cuts, calling them "devastating" and raising "substantial risk of not being able to meet our defense needs." President Obama has promised to veto any legislation seeking to avoid the cuts, and House Speaker John Boehner also indicated his commitment to following the cuts in the Budget Control Act. According to the Center for American Progress, several Presidents have significantly reduced defense spending after wars, without compromising national security. Defense spending in 2011 remained high by historical standards, adjusted for inflation.

The Budget Control Act also specifies automatic cuts of 7.8% to domestic programs and 2% to Medicare, while Medicaid and Social Security will be unaffected. These entitlement programs were protected from cuts in return for the absence of new revenues in the Budget Control Act.

The automatic cuts to domestic programs would include cuts of up to 11% to science research and development agencies such as the National Institutes of Health, NASA, and the U. S. National Laboratories run by the Department of Energy. It is anticipated that this could cause federal grant acceptance levels to fall into the single digits, a consequence which has been called catastrophic for academic institutions by Michael Lubell of the American Physical Society. The cuts could also endanger politically controversial research such as climate change research programs in NASA and National Oceanic and Atmospheric Administration. Due to the role of scientific research in economic growth and job creation, and given international competition in this field, the cuts have been opposed by professional and academic organizations, and federal support of research and development has been called "an area of U.S. investment too critical to be cut" by the American Association for the Advancement of Science.

=== Ten-year projections ===
Annual rates of increase in major revenue categories budgeted for the 2012-2022 period were:

- Individual income taxes: 8.4%
- Corporation income taxes: 8.2%
- Social insurance (mainly payroll) taxes: 6.6%
- Total tax revenues: 7.6%

Annual rates of increase in major spending categories budgeted for the 2012-2022 period were:

- Defense: 1.8%
- Non-defense discretionary: 1.6%
- Social Security: 5.8%
- Medicare: 6.6%
- Medicaid: 8.5%
- Net interest: 14.2%
- Total spending: 5.0%

Changes in revenues primarily represent a return to the long-run average. Tax revenues historically have averaged around 18% GDP. The subprime mortgage crisis resulted in significant declines in revenues, with revenue falling to a record low 15% GDP. President Obama's budget preserves the Bush income tax cuts for couples earning below $250,000, while eliminating some tax exemptions and deductions (tax expenditures).

Defense and non-defense discretionary expenses are essentially frozen in real dollar terms for the 2013-2022 period, growing at or below the rate of inflation. Department of Defense spending rose at an annual rate of 8% between 2000 and 2011; this amount includes both the baseline and war spending. Non-defense discretionary spending rose at an annual rate of 6.6% between 2000 and 2011. Mandatory spending is mainly driven by demographic changes (i.e., an aging population, with fewer workers per retiree), healthcare cost increases per capita, and Social Security cost of living adjustments. Interest costs represent a return to more typical interest rates as the economy recovers along with the growing public debt.

== Total revenues and spending ==
The Obama administration's February 2012 budget request contained $1 trillion in receipts and $200 billion in outlays, for a deficit of $400 billion. The budget projects a reduction in the deficit to $575 billion by 2018 before rising to $704 billion by 2022.

=== Total receipts ===
2013 Actual Receipts by Source
1. Individual income tax (65.0%)
2. Social Security/other payroll tax (15.0%)
3. Corporate income tax (0.00%)
4. Excise tax (5.00%)
5. Deposits of earnings and Federal Reserve System (4.00%)
6. Customs duties (3.00%)
7. Estate and gift taxes (5.00%)
8. Other miscellaneous receipts (3.00%)

(in billions of dollars)

Source	Requested	Enacted	Actual
Individual income tax	1,359	1,234	1,316
Corporate income tax	348	288	274
Social Security and other payroll tax	959	951	947
Excise tax	88	85	84
Customs duties	33	34	32
Estate and gift taxes	13	13	19
Deposits of earnings and Federal Reserve System	80	83	76
Other miscellaneous receipts	21	24	27
Total	2,902	2,712	2,775
