= United States fiscal cliff =

2013 tax increase and spending decrease

The United States fiscal cliff refers to the combined effect of several previously-enacted laws that came into effect simultaneously in January 2013, increasing taxes and decreasing spending.

The Bush tax cuts of 2001 and 2003, which had been extended for two years by the Tax Relief, Unemployment Insurance Reauthorization, and Job Creation Act of 2010, were scheduled to expire on December 31, 2012. Planned spending cuts under the Budget Control Act of 2011 also came into play. That Act was passed as a compromise to resolve a dispute concerning the US debt ceiling and address the failure of the 111th Congress to pass a federal budget. Discretionary spending for federal agencies and cabinet departments would have been reduced through broad cuts referred to as budget sequestration. Mandatory programs, such as Social Security, Medicaid, federal pay (including military pay and pensions) and veterans' benefits would have been exempted from the spending cuts.

The fiscal cliff would have increased tax rates and decreased government spending through sequestration. This would lead to an operating deficit (the amount by which government spending exceeds its revenue) that was projected to be reduced by roughly half in 2013. The previously-enacted laws causing the fiscal cliff were projected to produce a 19.63% increase in revenue and a 0.25% reduction in spending between fiscal years 2012 to 2013. The Congressional Budget Office (CBO) had estimated that the fiscal cliff would have likely caused a mild recession with higher unemployment in 2013, followed by strengthening in the labor market with increased economic growth.

The American Taxpayer Relief Act of 2012 (ATRA) addressed the fiscal cliff's revenue side by implementing smaller tax increases compared to the expiration of the Bush tax cuts. Adjustments to spending were expected to be resolved in early 2013. Intense debate and media coverage regarding the fiscal cliff triggered widespread public attention in late 2012 due to its projected short-term fiscal and economic impact.

The ATRA eliminated much of the fiscal cliff's tax side while the reduction in spending caused by budget sequestration was delayed for two months. With ATRA's passage, the CBO projected an 8.13% increase in revenue and a 1.15% increase in spending for fiscal year 2013. The act caused a projected $157 billion decline in the 2013 deficit over 2012, rather than the sharp $487 billion decrease projected under the fiscal cliff.

The raise in revenue contained in the ATRA came from increased marginal income and capital gains tax rates relative to their 2012 levels for annual income over $400,000 ($450,000 for couples); a phase-out of certain tax deductions and credits for those with incomes over $250,000 ($300,000 for couples); an increase in estate taxes relative to 2012 levels on estates over $5 million; and expiration of payroll tax cuts (a 2% increase for most taxpayers earning under approximately $110,000). None of these changes would expire.

At 12:01 am EST on January 1, 2013, the US "technically" went over the fiscal cliff.

Around 2 am EST on January 1, 2013, the U.S. Senate passed this compromise bill by an 89–8 margin. At about 11 pm that evening, the U.S. House of Representatives passed the same legislation without amendments by a 257–167 vote. U.S. President Barack Obama signed it into law the next day. However, the budget sequestration was only delayed and the debt ceiling was not changed, thus triggering the 2013 United States debt-ceiling crisis.

== Background ==
=== Etymology ===
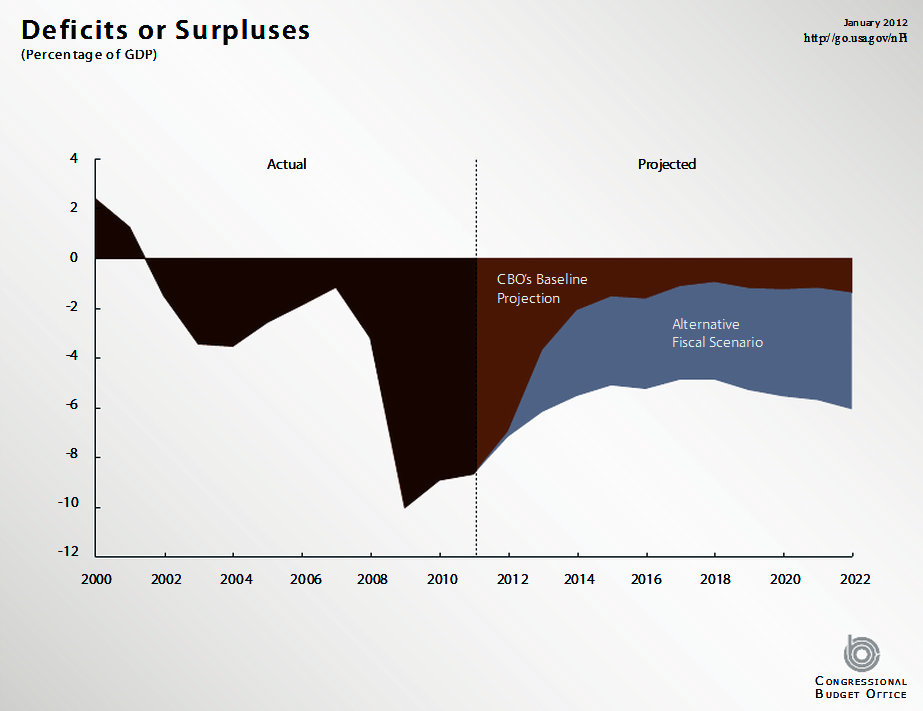
Budget deficits, projected through 2022. The "CBO Baseline" (in red) shows the expected effects of the fiscal cliff under then-current law, i.e., if Congress took no action in 2012. The "Alternative Scenario" (in blue) represents what was expected to happen if Congress were to extend the Bush tax cuts and repeal the Budget Control Act-mandated spending reductions.

The term fiscal cliff has been used in the past to refer to various fiscal issues. The term started being used in the context of the expiration of the Bush tax cuts in 2010. In 2011, the term started to be used to refer to the point at which tax cuts would expire, and spending cuts would be triggered, that would have occurred in 2013 under a fiscal-cliff scenario.

In late February 2012, Ben Bernanke, chairman of the U.S. Federal Reserve, popularized the term "fiscal cliff" for the upcoming reduction in the deficit. Before the House Financial Services Committee he described that "a massive fiscal cliff of large spending cuts and tax increases" would take place on January 1, 2013.

Some analysts had argued that fiscal slope or fiscal hill would have been a more appropriate analogy because while the cumulative economic effect over all of 2013 would be substantial, it would not have been felt immediately but rather gradually as the weeks and months went by.

=== Legislative history ===
During a lame-duck session in December 2010, Congress passed the Tax Relief, Unemployment Insurance Reauthorization, and Job Creation Act of 2010. The act extended the Bush tax cuts for an additional two years (until January 1, 2013) and "patched" the exemptions to the Alternative Minimum Tax (AMT) for tax year 2011. This act also authorized a one-year reduction in the Social Security (FICA) employee-payroll tax. The reduction was extended for the 2013 year by the Middle Class Tax Relief and Job Creation Act of 2012, which also extended federal unemployment benefits and the freeze on Medicare physician payments.

On August 2, 2011, Congress passed the Budget Control Act of 2011 as part of an agreement to resolve the debt-ceiling crisis. The Act provided for a Joint Select Committee on Deficit Reduction (the "super committee") to produce legislation by late November that would decrease the deficit by $1.2 trillion over ten years. When the super committee failed to act, another part of the BCA went into effect. This directed automatic across-the-board cuts (known as "sequestrations") split evenly between defense and domestic spending, beginning on January 2, 2013. Also, the Affordable Care Act imposed new taxes on families making more than $250,000 a year ($200,000 for individuals) starting at the same time.

At the end of 2011, the patch to the AMT exemptions expired. Technically, the AMT thresholds immediately reverted to their 2000 tax year levels, a drop of 26% for single people and 40% for married couples. Anyone over these reduced thresholds at the end of 2012 would be subject to the AMT. Therefore, more taxpayers would pay more unless some legislation was passed (as was done in 2007) that affects the exemptions retroactively.

The fiscal cliff was finally eliminated at the very last minute during late-night and early-morning sessions of Congress on New Year's Eve and New Year's Day. During a 2 am vote on January 1, 2013, the Senate passed the American Taxpayer Relief Act of 2012 by a margin of 89–8. The House passed the bill without amendments by a margin of 257–167 at about 11 am that same morning. Eighty-five House Republicans and 172 Democrats voted in favor while 151 Republicans and 16 Democrats were opposed.

=== Key laws leading to the fiscal cliff ===
CBO projections of the sources of deficit reduction in the FY2013 budget, not counting economic feedback.
1. Expiration of tax cuts and the subsequent growth in the AMT: $221B (36.4%)
2. Expiration of 2% FICA payroll tax cut: $95B (15.7%)
3. Other expiring tax provisions: $65B (10.7%)
4. Affordable Care Act taxes: $18B (3.97%)
5. Spending cuts ("sequestration") under the Budget Control Act of 2011: $65B (10.7%)
6. Expiration of federal emergency unemployment insurance: $26B (4.28%)
7. Reduction in Medicare payment rates for doctors: $11B (1.81%)
8. Other changes (mostly revenue, primarily reflecting economic growth): $105B (17.3%)

A number of laws led to the fiscal cliff, including these provisions:

- Expiration of the Bush tax cuts enacted as part of the Economic Growth and Tax Relief Reconciliation Act of 2001 and the Jobs and Growth Tax Relief Reconciliation Act of 2003, as extended by the Tax Relief, Unemployment Insurance Reauthorization, and Job Creation Act of 2010;
- Across-the-board spending cuts ("sequestration") to most discretionary programs as directed by the Budget Control Act of 2011;
- Reversion of the Alternative Minimum Tax thresholds to their 2000 tax year levels;
- Expiration of measures delaying the Medicare Sustainable Growth Rate from going into effect (the "doc fix"), as extended by the Middle Class Tax Relief and Job Creation Act of 2012 (MCTRJCA);
- Expiration of the 2% Social Security payroll tax cut, most recently extended by MCTRJCA;
- Expiration of federal unemployment benefits, as extended by MCTRJCA.
- New taxes imposed by the Patient Protection and Affordable Care Act and the Health Care and Education Reconciliation Act of 2010.

Without new legislation, these provisions were to automatically go into effect on January 1, 2013. Some provisions increased taxes (the expiration of the Bush and FICA payroll tax cuts and the new Affordable Care tax and AMT thresholds) while others reduced spending (sequestration, expiration of unemployment benefits and implementation of the Medicare SGR).

Some lawmakers had intended to attach a bipartisan extension to the expiring wind-power tax credit. Unlike the provisions above, this will reduce, not increase, taxes by $1.3 billion.

Proposals to avoid the fiscal cliff involved repealing legislation containing certain of these provisions or passing new legislation to extend provisions that were due to expire. Different proposals were to include changes to some or all of the above provisions. For example, the Congressional Budget Office's "Alternative Fiscal Scenario" included only the first four items above. Changes to other provisions were sometimes included in such proposals, such as changing the original caps on discretionary appropriations contained in 2011's Budget Control Act, indexing the AMT exemptions for inflation (rather than capping them for one year at a time) or the wholesale or partial reform of the tax laws and/or the entitlement programs (sometimes called "the grand bargain").

== Effects ==
=== Effects of sequestration ===
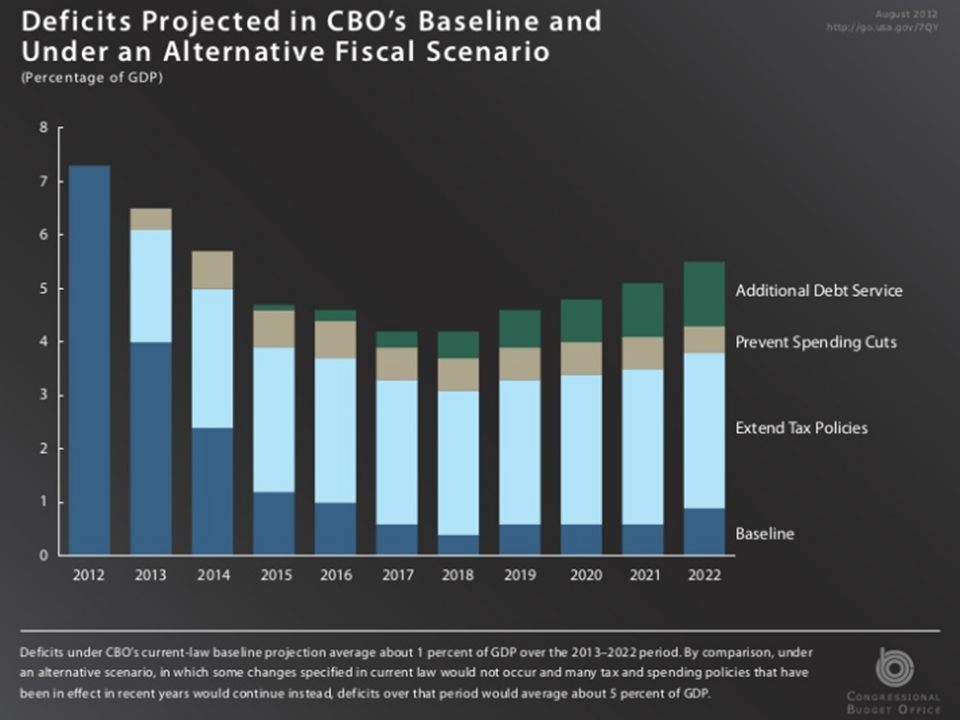
U.S. Federal budget deficit as % of GDP assuming continuation of certain policies for 2012–2022. The baseline deficit indicates the scenario with the fiscal cliff, meaning tax cuts expiring and spending cuts applied. Avoiding the "fiscal cliff" increased the projected deficit.

The spending reduction elements of the fiscal cliff are primarily contained within the Budget Control Act of 2011, which directed that both defense and non-defense discretionary spending (Note: Discretionary spending is that part of the federal budget that Congress generally controls through annual appropriation acts including the cabinet departments and federal agencies. This is as opposed to mandatory spending: those "self-funded" programs (such as Medicare and federal crop insurance) that have had their expenditures written into their "enabling acts"; that is, the acts that created them. In 2011, discretionary spending totaled about $1.35 trillion, accounting for close to 40 percent of federal expenditures. Slightly more than half of the discretionary money went for defense. The rest of the discretionary spending funded a wide variety of government programs and activities, including education, veterans' benefits, public health and the administration of justice.) be reduced by "sequestration" if Congress was unable to agree on other spending cuts of similar size. The scope of the law excludes major mandatory programs such as Social Security and Medicare. As of January 2013, Congress was unable to reach agreement on spending cuts and the sequestration was delayed until March 2013 as part of the American Taxpayer Relief Act of 2012.

The effect on discretionary spending will be significant if the sequestration is not avoided. Cuts totaling $110 billion per year will be applied from 2013 to 2022, split evenly ($55 billion each) between defense and non-defense discretionary spending. For scale, discretionary funding for 2011 totaled $1,278 billion: budget authority of $712 billion for defense and funding totaling $566 billion for non-defense activities.

During 2013, discretionary spending would be maintained around 2012 levels due to the sequester. However, the spending begins to rise thereafter, but not at the pace projected prior to the sequester. In other words, the trajectory of spending increases is reduced, but spending is not frozen at 2012 levels. Increases in discretionary spending from 2013 to 2021 would be about 1.5% annually, significantly below the prior decade.

For example, according to the CBO Historical Tables, defense spending (including overseas contingency operations for the wars in Iraq and Afghanistan) grew from $295 billion in 2000 to $700 billion in 2011, an annual growth rate of 8.2%. Non-defense discretionary spending grew at a 6.6% annual rate during that time, from $320 billion to $646 billion.

The austerity represented by the sequester is not unprecedented; from 1990 to 1999, defense spending actually declined by about 1% annually, from $300 billion to $276 billion, although non-defense discretionary spending grew by 4.5% annually, rising from $200 to $297 billion.

The CBO estimated the possible impact on defense spending in October 2011 testimony: "Compliance with the caps on discretionary funding could occur through many different combinations of defense and non-defense funding. For example, defense and nondefense appropriations might be cut proportionally relative to the funding that would be necessary to keep pace with inflation. In that case, funding for defense programs apart from overseas contingency operations would drop from $552 billion in 2011 to $538 billion in 2012 before rising again and reaching $637 billion in 2021 (see Table 3).

Between 2012 and 2021, such funding would be $445 billion less than the amount that would occur if the amount of funding for 2011 grew at the rate of inflation. When measured as a share of GDP, funding for defense would decline by about 1 percentage point from 2011 to 2021, or by more than one-fourth (see Table 5). Funding for defense in 2021 (excluding overseas contingency operations) would represent 2.7 percent of GDP; by comparison, annual funding for defense (excluding overseas contingency operations) has averaged 3.4 percent of GDP during the past decade."

The CBO estimated the possible impact on non-defense discretionary spending in October 2011 testimony: "If defense and nondefense appropriations were cut proportionally relative to the funding that would be necessary to keep pace with inflation, nondefense budget authority would decrease from $511 billion in 2011 to $505 billion in 2012 before rising again and reaching $597 billion in 2021 (see Table 4). Between 2012 and 2021, budget authority for nondefense purposes would be $418 billion less than the amount that would be provided if funding grew at the rate of inflation after 2011. Under an assumption that the obligation limitations for certain transportation programs grow over time at the rate of inflation, nondefense funding in 2021 would represent 2.8 percent of GDP; by comparison, such funding has averaged 4.1 percent of GDP during the past decade (see Figure 6)." Alan Houseman of the Center for Law and Social Policy has also argued that significant cuts to programs included under non-defense discretionary spending would harm low-income families deeply.

Loren Thompson of the Lexington Institute said that, as entitlement programs are largely exempt from the mandated cuts, sequestration would result in these programs assuming a larger percentage of the (reduced) budget, while spending on other programs such as defense would make up a smaller percentage of the budget.

Secretary of the Navy Ray Mabus said that continuing to operate under a series of continuing resolutions would be just as bad as sequestration, because these would freeze all programs at last year's spending levels, instead of allowing each program to adjust to its current situation. Also the CR is $4.6 billion below the proposed budget, which matches the $4.6 billion cut of sequestration. Should these both apply then the Department of the Navy would be almost $10 billion below plan. The Navy also suffers from congressional restrictions on shipbuilding and conversion which further strains their limited budget.

The military in 2013 claimed it had already cut spending in anticipation of sequestration. Defense Secretary Leon Panetta compared this reduction in spending to a burn rate, as faith ebbed in the ability of Congress to resolve the issue. Even as the Pentagon has had to curb needed investments, the impact from government by crisis cost the federal government billions of dollars in inefficiencies and the resulting economic uncertainties may have cost the overall economy millions of jobs. Michael O'Hanlon blamed the negative growth at the end of 2012 on Pentagon cuts in expectation of sequestration. And the USAF has moved to shut down the Tethered Aerostat Radar System which has proved vital in the fight against the Illegal drug trade. The looming cuts have already impacted national security strategy with the February 6, 2013 cancellation of the Harry S. Truman deployment, which marked an end to the policy of keeping two carriers in the Persian Gulf region. Sequestration would also delay plans to equip F-35 fighters with B61 nuclear bombs that have been upgraded to JDAM levels of accuracy to give these tactical nuclear weapons strategic effectiveness.

In February 2013, it was estimated that sequestration would reduce defense spending to the inflation adjusted cold war average.

On 20 February 2013, Defense Department Controller Robert Hale said that rather than cancelling contracts outright, the DoD would instead use furloughs and simply not exercise contract options for supplies and services. Hale testified the next month and told the Congress that it was their actions that were preventing the Pentagon from making sensible budget reductions and therefore forcing furloughs of defense civilian employees.

On 26 March 2013, Obama signed a continuing resolution that would allow for reprogramming requests to shift $10 billion in funds under the sequestration limit, however civilian furloughs across all Pentagon budget areas will be required to meet wartime costs.

In May 2013, Army Chief of Staff Gen. Ray Odierno warned that the lack of training in 2013 due to sequestration had already impacted on Army readiness.

The sequestration mandated cuts in drug enforcement were expected to result in a doubling of cocaine imports into the United States.

=== Effects of tax increases ===
Various sources have estimated the impact on taxpayers from the tax increases that would have occurred if the Bush income tax cuts and the Obama payroll tax cut had been allowed to expire with the fiscal cliff. The table below shows the dollar and percentage increase in income taxes for the 2013 tax year, if the fiscal cliff had taken effect.

Income level	Single (1 allowance)	Married (2 allowances)	Married, two children (4 allowances)
$50,000	$1,693 / 17%	$1,870 / 32%	$1,870 / 32%
$100,000	$4,193 / 16%	$3,272 / 17%	$3,038 / 18%
$150,000	$5,967 / 15%	$5,046 / 16%	$4,812 / 15%
$200,000	$7,467 / 13%	$6,546 / 14%	$6,312 / 14%
$250,000	$8,046 / 13%	$8,046 / 13%	$7,812 / 13%

Each piece of the fiscal cliff would have had varying effects on people at different income levels. Low-income households are most affected by expiring expansions of the child tax credit and earned income tax credit. Middle-income households are affected most by the payroll tax and income tax. Households at the top income level are most affected by the income tax and the tax increases on unearned income such as capital gains.

Although European companies and investors will hardly see any direct taxation effects, corporate taxation of their U.S. subsidiaries may change significantly.

== Congressional Budget Office projections ==
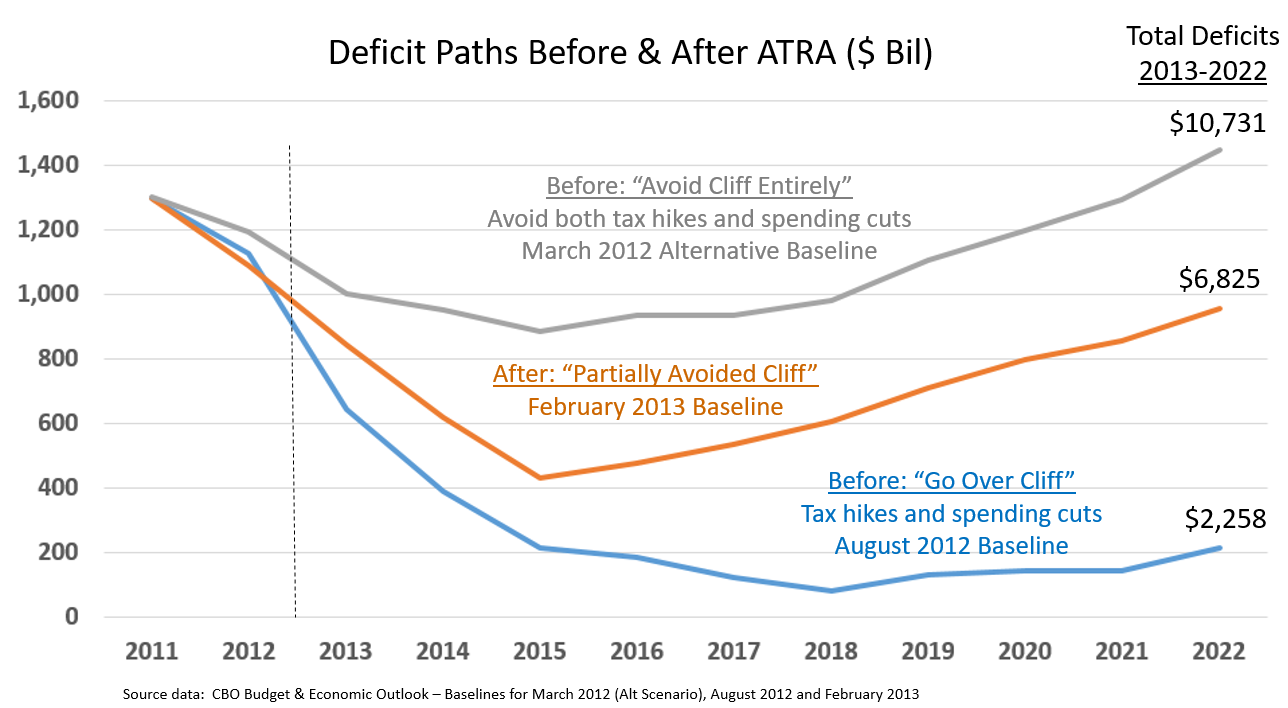
Three CBO deficit scenarios related to the American Taxpayer Relief Act of 2012 (ATRA) and the Fiscal Cliff. The blue line (August 2012 baseline) at bottom was the "current law" baseline, with tax increases and spending cuts that would take effect if laws were not changed. The grey line (March 2012 alternative baseline) was the "current policy" baseline, which represented the avoidance of the tax increases and spending cuts. The orange line (February 2013 baseline) was the post-ATRA result.

=== CBO scenarios ===
While Congress was debating actions to take to mitigate the fiscal cliff, the Congressional Budget Office provided policy-makers with projections of two fiscal scenarios for the years 2013 to 2022:

- The baseline projection (if Congress took no action and the cliff occurred): This scenario would have lower deficits and debt but would also have lower spending and higher taxes.
- The alternative fiscal scenario (another option in which some laws are changed): This would have had higher deficits and debt but lower taxes and higher spending. (Note: The Alternative Scenario incorporates the following assumptions over the Baseline: (a) Expiring tax provisions (other than the FICA tax cut) are extended, (b) the AMT is indexed for inflation after 2011, (c) Medicare's payment rates for physicians are held constant and (d) the automatic sequestrations do not occur. Both scenarios would have allowed the federal unemployment benefits and the 2% FICA payroll tax cut to expire. Both would have implemented the original caps on discretionary appropriations contained in 2011's Budget Control Act and allowed the new taxes for the Affordable Care Act to come into effect.)

These painted starkly different fiscal futures. If Congress and the President did not act, allowing tax cuts to expire and mandated spending cuts to be implemented, the next decade would have more closely resembled the baseline projection. If they acted to extend current policies, keeping lower tax rates in place and postponing or preventing the spending cuts, the next decade would more closely resemble the alternative fiscal scenario.

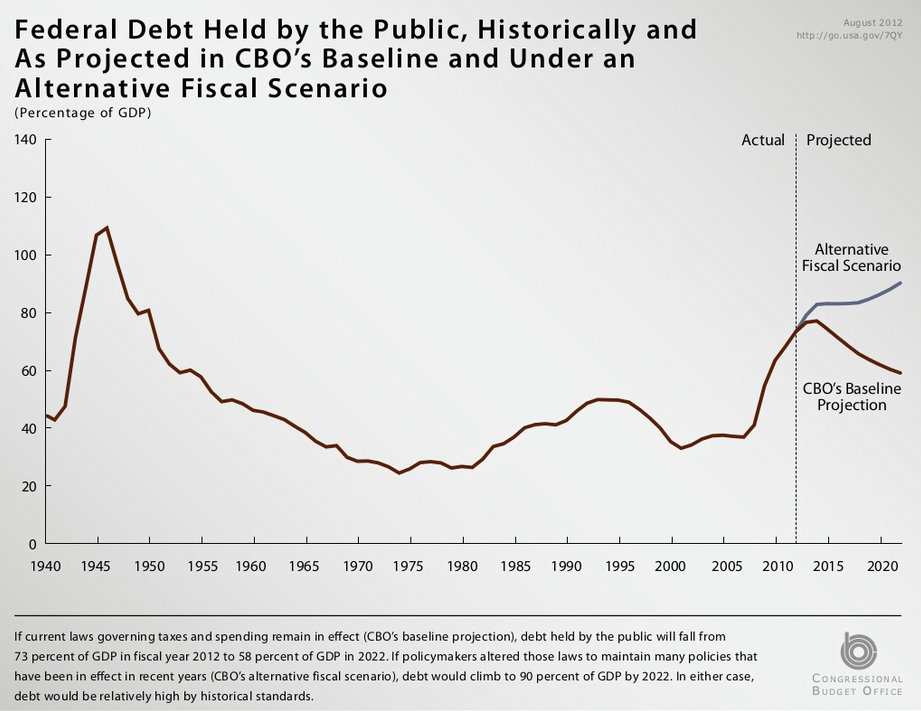
U.S. federal debt from 1940 to 2022. The right side of the diagram projects what would happen to the debt if Congress (a) allowed the "cliff" laws to take effect and reduce the deficit (the baseline) or (b) extended the existing policies, such as keeping tax cuts in place (the alternative).

Baseline projection. The CBO has been publishing baseline projections, following existing law, since 1985. Under the baseline projection (with the "cliff" occurring), tax cuts are allowed to expire and spending cuts are implemented in 2013, resulting in higher tax revenues plus reduced spending, thus lowering deficits, debt and interest for the next decade and beyond. Future deficits would be reduced from an estimated 8.5% of GDP in 2011 to 1.2% by 2021. Revenues would rise towards 24% GDP, versus the historical average 18% GDP.

The total deficit reduction or debt avoidance over ten years would have been as much as $7.1 trillion, versus the projected $10–11 trillion debt increase under the CBO's alternate scenario. In other words, roughly 70% of debt increases projected over the next ten years could have been avoided by "going over the cliff" and allowing the expiration of tax cuts and required sequestration expected at the end of 2012.

CBO estimated, under the baseline projection, that public debt would rise from 69% GDP in 2011 to 84% by 2035. In the long run, lower deficits and debt would have led to relatively higher growth estimates. But, in the short run, real GDP growth in 2013 would have likely been reduced to −0.5% from 1.1%. This would mean a high probability of recession (a 1.3% GDP contraction) during the first half of the year, followed by 2.3% growth in the second half.

Alternative fiscal scenario. If Congress had "avoided" the "fiscal cliff" by continuing its existing policies, the future would have more closely resembled the CBO's "alternative fiscal scenario". This scenario involved extending the Bush tax cuts, repealing the automatic spending cuts, restricting the reach of the AMT, and keeping Medicare reimbursement rates at existing levels (the so-called "doc fix", versus declining by one-third). Revenues were assumed to remain around the historical average of 18% GDP. Under this scenario, public debt rises from 69% GDP in 2011 to 100% by 2021 and approaches 190% by 2035. This scenario has considerably higher debt and interest payments than the baseline projection, but the short-term impact on the economy would have been avoided.

=== Projected effects ===
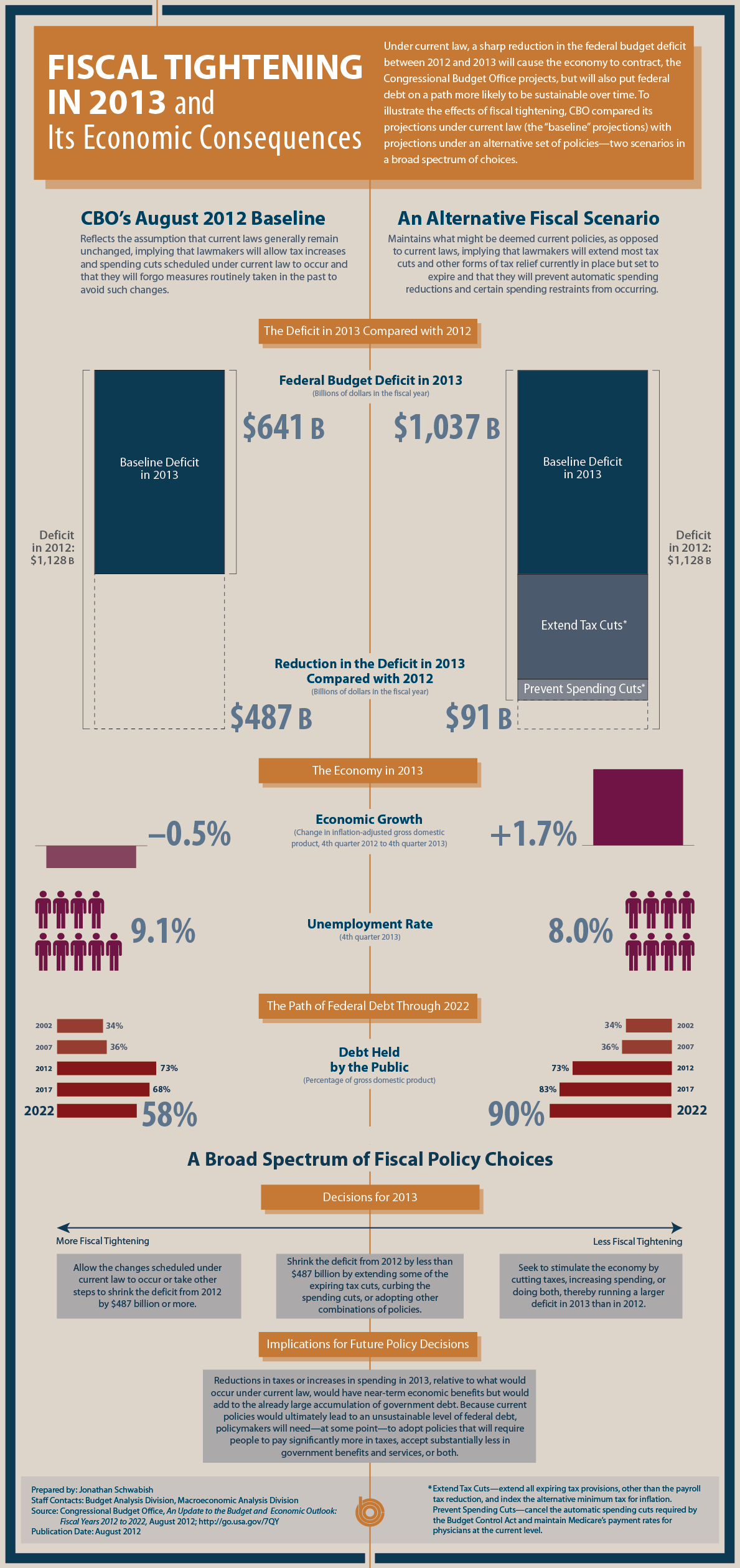
Overall effects of the fiscal cliff.

The Congressional Budget Office estimates that allowing certain laws on the books during 2012 to expire or take effect in 2013 (the baseline scenario) would cut the 2013 deficit approximately in half and significantly reduce the trajectory of future deficits and debt increases for the next decade and beyond. However, the 2014 deficit reduction would adversely impact the economy in the short-run. On the other hand, if Congress acts to extend current policies (the alternative scenario), deficits and debt will rise rapidly over the next decade and beyond, slowing the economy over the long run and dramatically increasing interest costs.

CBO estimates that if the baseline scenario is allowed to take effect in 2013, it would reduce federal spending by $103 billion and increase tax revenues by $399 billion (and another $105 billion "mostly in revenue") through September 2013 (the end of FY2013). This would amount to a net total of $560 billion, roughly half the $1.2 trillion FY2011 deficit. The White House estimates that a family of four with an income of $50,000 to $85,000 would pay an additional $2,200 in federal taxes.

The CBO has identified the following metrics for its baseline and alternative scenarios for the period starting January 2013:

Fiscal or Economic Measure	CBO Baseline	Alternative Scenario
Federal deficit in FY2013	$641 billion	$1037 billion
Economic growth in FY2013	−0.5% of GDP	1.7% of GDP
Unemployment rate for October thru December 2013	9.1%	8.0%
Public debt in 2022	58% of GDP	90% of GDP

Consideration of these scenarios and other options leads to what the CBO calls "a broad spectrum of fiscal policy choices."

=== Estimated deficit for the first year ===
The CBO estimated that the total deficit of fiscal year 2012 (which ended on September 30, 2012) will be $1.171 trillion. The CBO also estimated that the total reductions to the fiscal year 2013 deficit by letting current laws take effect (which increase taxes and reduce spending) would be about $560 billion.

Therefore, since the total U.S. public debt was approximately $11.053 trillion as of July 2012, the public debt will climb by the end of FY2013 to either $11.664 trillion.

Under current laws scheduled to take effect by the end of 2012, the total 2013 deficit will be $612 billion, as opposed to $1,171 billion for the previous year. The pie chart to the right contains a breakdown of the currently authorized reductions to the FY2013 deficit. The total of this chart is $606 billion but this is without considering economic feedback. Reduced taxes and increased spending, due to the 1.3% contraction in the first half of 2013, as well as other constraints, are expected to decrease the savings by $47 billion, giving a net total of $560 billion in deficit reduction during FY2013.

=== CBO analysis of policy options ===
The CBO reported in November 2012 the economic and employment effects of various policy options related to the cliff. Each option has a different GDP and employment impact per dollar of deficit impact. In other words, some choices are economically more efficient. CBO explained why spending cuts have a more significant adverse impact on the economy than tax increases per dollar of deficit reduction: "The larger 'bang for the buck' next year of the spending policies under the alternative fiscal scenario occurs because, CBO expects, a significant part of the decrease in taxes (relative to those under current law) would be saved rather than spent."

=== CBO analysis of 2012–2013 ATRA changes ===
The CBO's August 2012 "Baseline scenario" assumed revenue would increase from $2,435B (billion) in 2012 to $2,913B in 2013, an increase of $478B or 19.63%. It also assumed spending would decline from $3,563B in 2012 to $3,554B in 2013, a decrease of $9B or −0.25%. The deficit was projected to be $641B in 2013.

The CBO's January 1, 2013 analysis of the American Taxpayer Relief Act of 2012 (ATRA) included adjustments to the Baseline scenario for 2013 of -$280B in revenues and +$50B in spending. This lowers the 2013 Baseline revenue projection from $2,913 to $2,633B, an increase of $198B or 8.13% versus 2012 revenues of $2,435B, while raising the 2013 spending from $3,554B to $3,604B, an increase of $41B or 1.15% versus 2012 spending of $3,563B. After adjusting for these changes, the deficit was projected to be $971B in 2013 instead of the $641B projected prior to ATRA, an increase of $330B. Both deficit projections were below the 2012 deficit of $1,128B by $157B and $487B, respectively.

== Negotiations ==
=== Democratic proposals ===
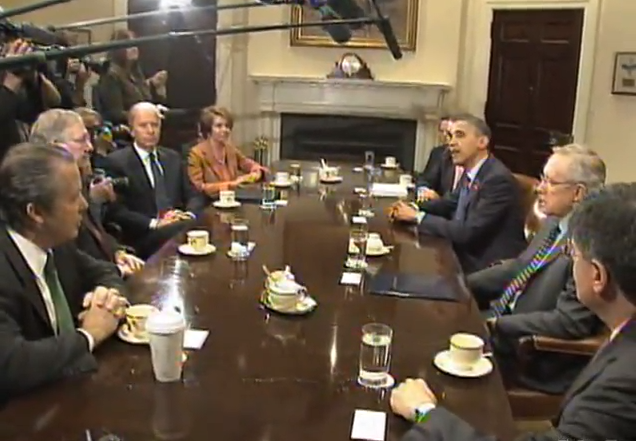
Democratic and Republican leaders meet in late November as part of the fiscal cliff debate.

On July 25, 2012, the Democratic-controlled U.S. Senate voted 51–48 to pass a bill supporting the President's tax proposal which extended the Bush tax cuts for 98% of taxpayers, while allowing them to lapse for the top 2%. The Senate also rejected the Republican proposal of extending the tax cuts for all by 45–54. The U.S. House of Representatives rejected, 170–257, the President's tax proposal on August 1, 2012.

During November 2012, President Obama expressed a preference for replacing the more blunt cuts of the sequester with more targeted cuts, while raising income tax rates on the top 2% of earners. Senior White House officials recommended a veto of any bill that: 1) averts defense cuts while leaving intact non-defense cuts; or 2) excludes an increase in tax rates for top earners. Obama wants to continue to extend the Bush tax cuts for American couples earning less than $250,000 and individuals earning less than $200,000.

As of November 30, 2012, Obama was calling for an undeclared amount of spending cuts, $1.6 trillion in higher taxes over ten years, and cuts of $400 billion from Medicare and other benefit programs over a decade. Obama also wanted "an extension of the 2 percentage point payroll tax cut" and spending of "at least $50 billion" in 2013 "to boost the economy." Although Democratic Congresspersons have in general supported President Obama's proposal, its November version was based on the President's 2013 budget proposal, which Republicans say was rejected unanimously in both the House and the Senate earlier in 2012. In March, House Minority Leader Nancy Pelosi said that the bill proposed by House Republicans for a vote "was a caricature of the President's budget, so we voted against it."

=== Republican proposals ===
Congressional Republicans have proposed that the Bush tax cuts be extended in their entirety. In August 2012, the CBO estimated that extending these tax cuts for the 2013–2022 time period would add $3.18 trillion to the national debt relative to the current law baseline, comprising $2.74 trillion in foregone tax revenue plus another $440 billion for interest and debt service costs.

On December 3, 2012, Speaker John Boehner proposed a Republican plan that included $2.2 trillion in deficit cuts over a decade. Revenue would be generated mainly by reducing tax expenditures (exemptions and deductions) rather than increasing income tax rates. Further, it included raising the Medicare eligibility age from 65 to 67 and slowing increases in Social Security costs by reducing cost-of-living adjustments.

On December 18, 2012, Boehner announced that a new "Plan B" would be taken up by the House. This plan would raise tax rates for those who earn over a million dollars. However, by December 20, 2012, he was forced to pull the measure when it became clear that House Republicans would not support it.

=== Other viewpoints ===
==== Gang of Eight ====
The "Gang of Eight" referred to a group of eight leaders of each of the two parties from both the United States Senate and United States House of Representatives that formed in November 2012 in hopes of forging a bipartisan compromise on the Fiscal Cliff crisis that arose that year. They were:

- Sen. Michael F. Bennet, D-Colo.
- Sen. Tom Coburn (Finance Committee member), R-Okla.
- Sen. Kent Conrad (Budget Committee Chairman), D-N.D.
- Sen. Saxby Chambliss, R-Ga.
- Sen. Mike Crapo (Finance Committee member), R-Idaho
- Sen. Richard J. Durbin (Majority Whip), D-Il.
- Sen. Mike Johanns, R-Neb.
- Sen. Mark R. Warner, D-Va.

They had been working since 2011 but "[have] so far failed to reach an agreement after more than a year of talks." Because of the number of spending cuts and tax changes, at least half a dozen committees, such as the House Ways and Means and Senate Finance committees, might want to weigh in on the bill. Congressional rules allow bills to skip committee hearings, but the group lacks the clout to "push its plan through Congress outside the regular order of business."

==== IRS ====
In a three-page letter, Steven Miller, then acting IRS Commissioner, outlined the effects of the fiscal cliff and said that the IRS is working under the assumption that Congress would "patch" the Alternative Minimum Tax (AMT). The patch prevents the AMT from affecting many more taxpayers. This is similar to what Congress has done in previous years. The Congressional Budget Office (CBO) estimated in August 2012 that if the patch were not implemented, federal revenues would rise by a total of $864 billion over the 2013–2022 period.

==== Federal Reserve ====
On December 12, 2012, the Federal Reserve announced it would keep short-term interest rates near zero percent in an effort to lower unemployment to 6.5 percent. However, when commenting on the upcoming fiscal cliff, Federal Reserve officials "agree that the impact of the bank's stimulus campaign will be trivial in comparison to the consequences, and the economy will most likely return to recession."

==== Treasury ====
The US debt ceiling became involved in the fiscal cliff debate when Treasury Secretary Timothy Geithner introduced the President's authority to raise the country's borrowing limit as a part of his first formal proposal. Although not strictly part of the fiscal cliff, (Note: This is because the debt ceiling is not a factor in the budget process per se; if the deficit is increased above the debt ceiling then that debt must be authorized in what has historically been a separate process.) the current debt-ceiling will also expire around the end of the year, unless "extraordinary measures" are used.

On December 26, 2012, Geithner announced that the federal government would exceed the current debt ceiling on December 31, 2012. Therefore, a number of measures would be put into place to delay this from happening, starting with suspending issuance of State and Local bonds on December 28 and investing in two government pension plans. These and other measures would normally delay reaching the debt ceiling for about two months but, because of debate over the fiscal cliff, this might be extended if there is no change in the current laws.

==== Defense ====
According to former Secretary of Defense Robert Gates, the deep across-the-board cuts in defense spending required by the Budget Control Act will threaten military-dependent local economies and "do great damage" to American military strength and homeland security.

==== Others ====
Many experts have argued that the U.S. should avoid the fiscal cliff while taking steps to bring the long-term deficit and debt trajectory under control. For example, economist Paul Krugman recommended that the U.S. focus on employment in the short-run, rather than the deficit. Federal Reserve Chair Ben Bernanke emphasized the importance of balancing long-term deficit reduction with actions that would not slow the economy in the short-run. Charles Konigsburg, who directed the bi-partisan Domenici-Rivlin deficit reduction panel, advocated avoiding the fiscal cliff while taking steps to reduce the budget deficit over time. He recommended the adoption of ideas from deficit panels such as Domenici-Rivlin and Bowles-Simpson that accomplish these two goals.

Other experts at the Center on Budget and Policy Priorities and the Carlyle Group have argued that allowing the tax increases and spending cuts to occur under current law may be necessary to create the "grand bargain" required to get the U.S. deficit and debt trajectory under control for the long-run. In other words, allowing current law to take effect would create conditions under which legislators might be forced to enact better designed deficit reduction approaches of similar or greater magnitude. Conservative budget experts have opposed calls to raise taxes or to allow defense sequestration, and have called on congressional leaders to return to normal budgetary process. Patrick Knudsen, a Heritage Foundation fellow, argued that lawmakers should seek long-term stability by rejecting short-term fixes and "grand bargains."

=== Summary ===
This table contains a comparison of the official proposals and counter-proposals from President Obama and Speaker Boehner, as of December 18, 2012. It does not include leaked or partial information about one specific aspect of an offer nor does it include partisan votes in the House or the Senate.

Dollar amounts are shown in billions.

Budget Category	Obama#1 Nov 29	Boehner#1 Dec 3	Obama#2 Dec 10	Boehner#2 Dec 14	Obama#3 Dec 17
Discretionary Spending	$0	$300	$0	$850	$200
Health Care	$350	$600	$350	$850	$400
Other Mandatory	$250	$300	$250	$850	$200
Chained CPI for Spending	$0	$150	$0	$150	$125
Spending Subtotal	$600	$1,350	$600	$1,000	$925
Upfront Revenue	$950	$800	$1,400	$250	$1,150
Additional Revenue Through Tax Reform	$600	$800	$1,400	$700	$1,150
Chained CPI for Revenue	$0	$50	$0	$50	$50
Revenue Subtotal	$1,550	$850	$1,400	$1,000	$1,200
Interest	$225	$325	$200	$300	$300
Stimulus / Tax Extenders (Note: These provisions are basically corporate tax credits or specific spending authorizations, which are set to expire from time to time and therefore must be renewed (or made permanent) if Congress wants that particular effect not to run out. They act against the primary purpose of avoiding the fiscal cliff, either increasing spending or decreasing taxes.)	−$425	$0	−$425	$0	−$175
Total	$1,950	$2,525	$1,775	$2,300	$2,250
Public Debt in 2022 as a percent of GDP	74%	71%	74%	72%	72%

== Partial resolution ==
=== American Taxpayer Relief Act of 2012 ===
At around 2 am on January 1, 2013, the Senate passed a compromise bill, the American Taxpayer Relief Act of 2012, by a margin of 89–8. The bill faced uncertain prospects in the House of Representatives as Eric Cantor, the House Majority Leader, said on January 1 that he did not support it. The prospect was raised that the House would pass an amended bill, but it was determined to be unlikely that the Senate would vote on any amended legislation before the end of the 112th Congress at noon on January 3, 2013 (all legislation under consideration expires at the end of each Congress). The House passed the bill without amendments by a margin of 257–167 at 11 pm on January 1, 2013. 85 Republicans and 172 Democrats voted in favor while 151 Republicans and 16 Democrats were opposed.

The act contains the following provisions:

- The budget sequestration was delayed by two months to give time for further negotiations on deficit reduction. $24 billion (out of $110 billion for FY2013) was offset by tax increases, as well as a provision allowing 401(k) accounts to be rolled over into Roth IRA plans, requiring taxes to be paid on the assets.
- Marginal income and capital gains tax rates increased relative to their 2012 levels for those with annual income over $400,000 for individuals and $450,000 for couples, but the rates below these levels remained at their 2012 levels. The top income rate increased from 35% to 39.6%, and the capital gains rate increased from 15% to 20%.
- A phase-out of tax deductions and credits for incomes over $250,000 for individuals and $300,000 for couples was reinstated. Limits on deductions had existed before the Bush tax cuts, and had disappeared in 2010.
- Estate taxes were set at 40% of the value above $5,000,000, an increase from the 2012 rate of 35% of the value over $5,120,000.
- Changes were made to the alternative minimum tax to index it to inflation, to avoid its application to middle-class families.
- The two-year-old cut to payroll taxes was allowed to expire.
- Federal unemployment benefits were extended for a year without a budget offset elsewhere, at a cost of $30 billion.
- Some tax credits for poorer families were extended for five years, including ones for college tuition and an expansion of the Earned Income Tax Credit.
- The Medicare "doc fix", suspending a decrease in physician payments due to the Medicare Sustainable Growth Rate, was extended for one year.
- A pay freeze for members of Congress was extended, but the general pay freeze for government workers was not.
- Some portions of the farm bill that had expired in September were extended for nine months, but without changes supported by dairy farmers and legislators.
- A number of corporate tax breaks and loopholes were extended, including the "active financing" tax exemption for major corporations (cost $9 billion), a rum tax supporting Puerto Rico rum industry ($547 million in 2009) and a tax benefit for NASCAR racetrack owners (around $43 million).

In all, the bill included $600 billion over ten years in new tax revenue, about one-fifth of the revenue that would have been raised had no legislation been passed. This would be the first year-to-year income-tax rate increase since 1993. The new rates for income, capital gains, estates, and the alternative minimum tax would be made permanent. The passage of the bill came after days of negotiations between Senate leaders and the Obama administration, with the final agreement being attributed to talks between Vice President Joe Biden and Senate Minority Leader Mitch McConnell. Some Democrats criticized the bill for not raising taxes on the wealthy more, while Republicans criticized it for raising tax rates while not providing explicit spending cuts.

According to CBO, the total deficits for the 2013–2022 period would be increased by $3,971 billion relative to not passing the bill. CBO separately indicated in January 2013 that $600 billion in additional interest costs over the 2013–2022 period were not included in their initial assessment discussed above. This increases the deficit estimate to $4,571 billion. While ATRA would reduce short-term economic impact due to the cliff, it would slow long-term growth relative to the lower deficit Baseline scenario.

The table below shows the estimated impact on taxpayers from the tax increases that occurred with the expiration of the Obama payroll tax cut and partial expiration of the Bush income tax cuts. The estimated impact is given as an average for the different income levels. The baseline that is used is if the payroll tax cut had been extended, new health care tax not implemented, and Bush income tax cuts fully extended. Average federal taxes include individual income taxes, corporate income taxes, payroll taxes, and estate taxes as a percentage of average cash income.

Income Level	Average Federal Tax Change	Average Federal Tax Rate	
Income Level	Average Federal Tax Change	Change in % Points	Under New Law
$0 – $20,112	$120	1.1%	1.9%
$20,113 – $39,789	$367	1.2%	9.5%
$39,790 – $64,483	$679	1.3%	15.6%
$64,484 – $108,266	$1,147	1.4%	19.0%
> $108,266	$5,574	2.3%	28.1%
All Income Levels	$1,257	1.8%	21.7%

=== Debt limit extension ===
The sequestration fight was then expected to occur during negotiations over a debt limit increase that was expected to be needed sometime in February. However, on January 23, 2013, the Republican-led House passed a bill suspending the debt ceiling until May 18, 2013. The bill did not include any offsetting budget cuts, as Republicans had previously stated as a precondition for raising the debt limit. The move was seen as an attempt to delay a showdown on the debt limit given their experience with the 2011 debt-ceiling crisis, as well as the recent Democratic gains in the 2012 elections.

On January 31, 2013, the Senate approved the House passed debt limit bill (H.R. 325) known as No Budget, No Pay Act of 2013 in a 64-to-34 vote. The legislation extends the current borrowing cap of $16.4 trillion through at least May 18, 2013.

The May 18 deadline is after the March 1 deadline for the sequestration, and the March 27 expiration of the continuing resolution funding the federal government. The bill also included a provision that would delay the salaries of Congressmen of any house that had not passed a resolution on the FY2013 budget by April 15, 2013.

== Timeline ==
- March 23, 2010: President Barack Obama signed into law the Patient Protection and Affordable Care Act. One of this law's provisions is to impose new taxes on families making $250,000 per year or more starting in 2013.
- December 17, 2010: Obama signed the Tax Relief, Unemployment Insurance Reauthorization, and Job Creation Act of 2010, patching the AMT through 2011 and extending the Bush tax cuts to the end of 2012.
- August 2, 2011: The President signed the Budget Control Act of 2011. This act provided that, if the Joint Select Committee did not produce bipartisan legislation, across-the-board spending cuts would take effect on January 2, 2013.
- February 22, 2012: Obama signed into law the Middle Class Tax Relief and Job Creation Act of 2012, which extended the following provisions until December 31, 2012: the 2% Social Security payroll tax cut, federal unemployment benefits and the freeze on Medicare physician payments.
- February 29, 2012: Ben Bernanke popularized the term "fiscal cliff" in his testimony before the House Financial Services Committee.
- July 3, 2012: IMF head Lagarde warned that the threat of "going over the fiscal cliff" could weaken the U.S. economy later in 2012. The IMF also reduced its projection for U.S. growth in 2013 from 2.4 to 2.25 percent of GDP.
- July 17, 2012: Bernanke pushed Congress to avoid the fiscal cliff, warning that a failure to do so will further dampen the sluggish economic recovery.
- July 31, 2012: Reid and Boehner agreed on a continuing resolution that would pay for the day-to-day running of the government until the end of March 2013. This does not affect the fiscal cliff or the debt-ceiling.
- August 7, 2012: Obama signed the Sequestration Transparency Act of 2012, which directed his administration to detail in 30 days how they plan to implement the automatic cuts mandated by the Budget Control Act.
- September 14, 2012: Obama released a 400-page report listing his proposal for spending cuts.
- October 22, 2012: At the third of three presidential debates, Obama says sequestration will not happen.
- November 16, 2012: President Obama met with Republican and Democratic congressional leaders to discuss the fiscal cliff and to try to come up with their initial plans immediately after the Thanksgiving break.
- November 28, 2012: Certain Republicans, such as Orrin G. Hatch (R-Utah), supported "modifying tax expenditures as a way to raise revenue."
- November 29, 2012: Treasury Secretary Timothy Geithner delivered a proposal containing $1.6 trillion in new taxes, $50 billion in stimulus spending, and $400 billion in federal health savings over the next decade. As part of the proposal, the President wanted an extension of the 2% payroll tax cut and authority to raise the debt ceiling.
- December 3, 2012: Both Republicans and Democrats remain in the early stages of negotiations for a possible solution. Republicans proposed adding $600 billion in spending cuts by increasing the Medicare eligibility age from 65 to 67 and reducing Social Security benefits. However, both parties continued to ridicule each other's proposals, such as when Jay Carney called a proposal "magic beans and fairy dust" or when Boehner called a proposal a "La-La Land offer."
- December 5, 2012: Senate Minority Leader Mitch McConnell (R-Ky.) offered to vote on President Obama's proposal, as proposed by Treasury Secretary Geithner, as an amendment to H.R. 6156, the Russian trade bill, in the Senate. However, Senate Majority Leader Harry Reid, (D-Nev.), prevented the vote. Reid's reported reasons was that the Russian trade bill "is to protect American jobs" and "there is no Geithner proposal." McConnell said he would introduce the bill as "a stand-alone vote."
- December 5, 2012: Confirming leaks from the White House, Treasury Secretary Timothy Geithner told CNBC that the Obama Administration is "absolutely" willing to go over the fiscal cliff if Republicans refused to back off from their opposition to raising rates on wealthier Americans.
- December 13, 2012: Both parties have publicly stated the negotiations are at a stand still. Several commentators have reported that a deal is not expected until after December 25, 2012 but not before December 30, 2012. Furthermore, one commentator described the parties as "playing familiar roles in a largely choreographed drama."
- December 15, 2012: In confidential talks, Boehner proposed an increase in tax rates for those who earn over a million dollars.
- December 17, 2012: According to media reports, various proposals were exchanged between President Obama and House Speaker Boehner to deal with the fiscal cliff. These included: changing the Consumer Price Index for entitlements to a "chained" CPI, allowing marginal tax rates to increase on income over $400,000, a one- or two-year increase in the debt ceiling and increasing the eligibility age for Medicare from 65 to 67.
- December 18, 2012: Speaker Boehner announced that the House would vote on a "Plan B", which would raise tax rates on people earning more than a million dollars a year.
- December 20, 2012: "Plan B" was pulled from consideration in the House because the Republican leadership could not find enough votes to pass the legislation. This was seen as a defeat for Speaker Boehner.
- December 21, 2012: With just 10 days left before the end of the year, President Obama scaled back his proposals and urged Congress to adopt stopgap measures to: prevent taxes from rising on income under $250,000 a year, restore unemployment benefits and "lay the groundwork" for budgetary action next year.
- December 26, 2012: The U.S. Treasury Department announced that it will begin a series of measures, similar to the ones taken in the summer of 2011, to delay exceeding the current 16.4 trillion dollar debt ceiling.
- December 27, 2012: Obama cuts short a vacation to Hawaii and returns to Washington D.C. in a last-chance attempt at a deal regarding the fiscal cliff.
- December 28, 2012: According to confidential sources, the 112th Congress could not pass legislation to avert the fiscal cliff until January because Congress would not meet until December 31, 2012. The 113th Congress is scheduled to convene January 3, 2013, at 12 pm.

Four bills are being discussed.
1. H.R. 8, the Job Protection and Recession Prevention Act of 2012 (which was later renamed the American Taxpayer Relief Act of 2012), would extend the expiring 2001 and 2003 Bush-era tax cuts for one year.
2. H.R. 6684, the Spending Reduction Act of 2012, would prevent the scheduled sequestration cuts.
3. Senate-passed Middle Class Tax Cut Act (S. 3412), which was voted on in the Senate on July 25, 2012, would extend for one year the Bush-era tax cuts on the first $ 250,000 of income reported on joint returns and would patch the alternative minimum tax for 2012, but not 2013.
4. H.R. 15, the House-passed Middle Class Tax Cut Act, mirrors the Senate-passed bill with substantial similarities.

- Late December 28, 2012: Speaker Boehner and President Obama turned negotiations over to Senator Harry Reid and Senator Mitch McConnell to create a last minute agreement. Boehner stated the House of Representatives "would act on whatever the Senate could produce."
- December 29, 2012: Reid and McConnell proposed various plans to avert the fiscal cliff, but confidential sources say both Senators "were still far apart from a deal." For the Senators' positions, see this Politico newspaper video. Various elected U.S. officials said they are concerned how the fiscal cliff negotiations will impact their reelection campaigns and the public image of the U.S. Congress.
- December 30, 2012: Because Senate leaders could not produce a fiscal cliff agreement deal, Vice President Joseph R. Biden Jr. decided to become part of the negotiations. When reporters asked Senator Reid if negotiations were continuing, Reid said "Talk to Joe Biden and McConnell," which signified that negotiations between Reid and Senator McConnell have ended.
- Early December 31, 2012: According to confidential reports, negotiations were proceeding well.
- Late December 31, 2012: An unnamed source in the Obama administration reported that a temporary deal had been reached that would delay harsh spending cuts by two months, postponing the potential "falling off" to at least March 2013.
- At 12:01 am EST on January 1, 2013, the United States of America "technically" went over the fiscal cliff.
- At around 2 am on January 1, 2013, the Senate passed a compromise bill, the American Taxpayer Relief Act of 2012, by a margin of 89–8. The bill would delay the budget sequestration by two months, and increase marginal income and capital gains tax rates relative to their 2012 levels for annual income over $400,000 for individuals and $450,000 for couples. A phase-out of tax deductions and credits for incomes over $250,000 would be reinstated from the times before the Bush tax cuts. The two-year-old cut to payroll taxes would expire, while estate taxes would increase, and changes would be made to the alternative minimum tax to avoid its application to middle-class families. These changes would all be made permanent. In addition, federal unemployment benefits would be extended for a year without a budget offset elsewhere.
- The afternoon of January 1 it was reported that House Republicans had expressed "anger" over the Senate-passed deal, potentially jeopardizing its passage. The House nonetheless passed the American Taxpayer Relief Act of 2012 (H.R. 8) that evening with two thirds of the supporting votes coming from Democrats and one third from Republicans.
- Late on January 2, 2013, Obama signed into law the official copy of the bill that Congress had passed the previous day.

== See also ==
- Recession of 1937–1938
- Tax uncertainty
