= Lubell =

Lubell is a surname. Notable people with the surname include:

- Benedict I. Lubell (1909–1996), American oil executive and philanthropist
- David Lubell, American mathematician known for the Lubell–Yamamoto–Meshalkin inequality
- Michael Lubell, American physicist
- Nathaniel Lubell (1916–2006), American fencer
- Samuel Lubell (1911–1987), American pollster, journalist, and author
- Winifred Milius Lubell (1914–2012), American illustrator, artist, and writer
