= Policy uncertainty =

Policy uncertainty (also called regime uncertainty) is a class of economic risk where the future path of government policy is uncertain, raising risk premia and leading businesses and individuals to delay spending and investment until this uncertainty has been resolved. Policy uncertainty may refer to uncertainty about monetary or fiscal policy, the tax or regulatory regime, or uncertainty over electoral outcomes that will influence political leadership.

== The Great Recession ==
During the Great Recession of the late 2000s and the years following it, many academics, policymakers, and business leaders have asserted that levels of policy uncertainty had risen dramatically and had contributed to the depth of the recession and the weakness of the following recovery.

=== United States ===
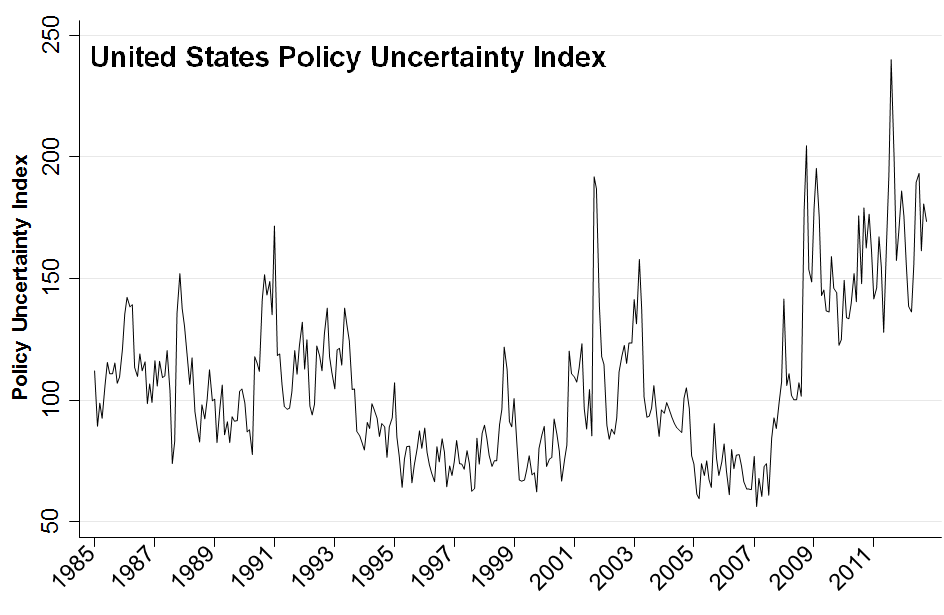
United States Economic Policy Uncertainty Index

Much of the policy uncertainty in the United States has revolved around fiscal policy as well as uncertainty over the tax code. This is best exemplified by partisan fights in the United States Congress over the Fiscal Cliff and raising the debt ceiling. In addition, important pieces of environmental, energy, healthcare, and financial regulation were disputed in Congress and the wider political arena during these years.

=== Europe ===
Policy uncertainty in Europe has been an issue due to uncertainty over the European Sovereign Debt Crisis and its possible outcomes. The future path of government spending, potential bailouts, monetary policy by the European Central Bank have been widely speculated on, making for a highly uncertain business environment.

== Risks versus uncertainty ==
Frank Hyneman Knight (1885 - 1972), one of the founders of the Chicago school, known for his Risk Uncertainty and Profit, a monumental study of the role of the entrepreneur in economic life in which he distinguished between economic risk and so-called Knightian uncertainty. Situations with risk were those where the outcomes were unknown but governed by probability distributions known at the outset. He argued that these situations, where decision making rules such as maximising expected utility can be applied, differ in a deep way from "uncertain" ones, where the outcomes were likewise random, but governed by an unknown probability model. Knight argued that uncertainty gave rise to economic profits that perfect competition could not eliminate.

== Regime uncertainty ==
A related concept developed by Robert Higgs, regime uncertainty is about more than the government's laws, regulations, and administrative decisions. For one thing, as the saying goes, "personnel is policy." A business-hostile administration will provoke more apprehension among investors than a business-friendlier administration, even if the underlying "rules of the game" are identical on paper. Similar differences between judiciaries create uncertainties about how the courts will rule on contested laws and government actions.

Additionally, seemingly neutral changes in policies or personnel may have major implications for specific types of investment. Even when government changes the rules in a way that seemingly strengthens private-property rights overall, the action's specific form may jeopardize particular types of investment, and apprehension about such a threat may paralyze investors in these areas. Moreover, it may also give pause to investors in other areas, who fear that what the government has done to harm others today, it may do to them tomorrow. In sum, heightened uncertainty in general — a perceived increase in the potential variance of all sorts of relevant government action — may deter investment even if expectations shift toward more secure private-property rights.
