= State of Mind (TV series) =

American comedy-drama TV series (2007)

- Genre: Comedy drama
- Created by: Amy Bloom
- Written by: Amy Bloom; K.J. Steinberg
- Directed by: Michael McDonald
- Starring: Lili Taylor; Theresa Randle; Mido Hamada; Devon Gummersall; Kevin Chamberlin; Derek Riddell; Chris Diamantopoulos; Samira Damavandi; Ken Page
- Composer: Mason Daring
- Country of origin: United States
- Original language: English
- No. of seasons: 1
- No. of episodes: 8

Production
- Executive producers: Michael M. Robin; Greer Shephard; Michael McDonald; Amy Bloom
- Producers: Bernadette Caulfield; Chris Donahue
- Cinematography: Anette Haellmigk; Matthew Williams
- Camera setup: Single-camera
- Running time: 44 mins.
- Production companies: The Shephard/Robin Company; Warner Horizon Television

Original release
- Network: Lifetime
- Release: July 15 – September 9, 2007

State of Mind is an American comedy-drama series created by novelist Amy Bloom. The series stars Lili Taylor and premiered on Lifetime on July 15, 2007. Its last episode aired on September 9, 2007.

== Synopsis ==
Anne Bellowes is a psychiatrist who unexpectedly finds her husband cheating on her with their marriage counselor. The series deals with Bellowes and her relationship with her patients as well as other doctors in the practice.

== Cast ==
- Lili Taylor as Dr. Ann Bellowes
- Theresa Randle as Dr. Cordelia Banks
- Mido Hamada as Dr. Taj Kalid
- Devon Gummersall as Barry White
- Kevin Chamberlin as Fred Smedresman
- Derek Riddell as Dr. James Lecroix
- Chris Diamantopoulos as Phil Eriksen
- Samira Damavandi as Jhasmine Kalid
- Ken Page as Florian

== Episodes ==
No.	Title	Directed by	Written by	Original release date
1	"Pilot"	Michael McDonald	Amy Bloom	July 15, 2007
2	"Between Here and There"	Michael M. Robin	Amy Bloom	July 22, 2007
3	"Snow Melts"	Rick Wallace	K.J. Steinberg	July 29, 2007
4	"Passion Fishing"	Adam Arkin	Amy Bloom	August 5, 2007
5	"Helpy Helperpants"	Michael McDonald	Amy Bloom	August 12, 2007
6	"In Bocca Al Lupo"	Arvin Brown	Oliver Goldstick	August 19, 2007
7	"O Rose, Thou Art Sick"	Henry Winkler	Amy Bloom	August 26, 2007
8	"Lost and Found"	Julia Sweeney	Oliver Goldstick	September 9, 2007

== Reception ==
Common Sense Media gave the show 4 out of 5 stars.
