= Amy Bloom =

American writer and psychotherapist (born 1953)

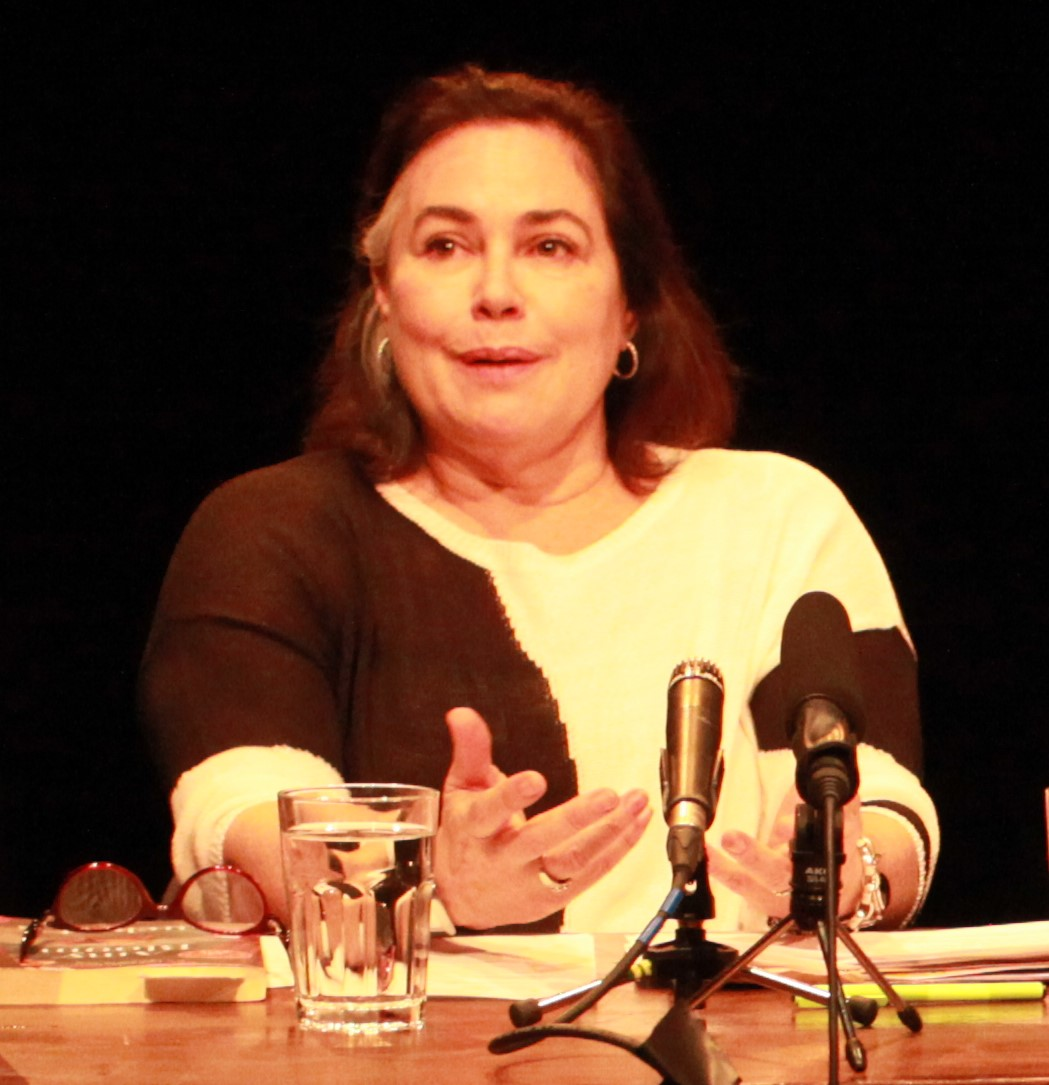
- Amy Bloom at the English Theatre Berlin, March 2015
- Born: 1953 (age 72–73)
- Education: Wesleyan University (BA); Smith College (MSW)
- Occupations: Writer, psychotherapist
- Relatives: Michael Lubell (brother-in-law)

Amy Beth Bloom (born 1953) is an American writer and psychotherapist. She is professor of creative writing at Wesleyan University, and has been nominated for the National Book Award and the National Book Critics Circle Award.

== Early life and career ==
Bloom is the daughter of Murray Teigh Bloom (1916–2009), an author, and Sydelle J. Cohen, a psychotherapist. Bloom received a Bachelor of Arts degree in Theater/Political Science, magna cum laude, Phi Beta Kappa, from Wesleyan University, and a M.S.W. (Master of Social Work) from Smith College.

Trained as a social worker, she has practiced psychotherapy. Currently, Bloom is the Kim-Frank Family University Writer in Residence at Wesleyan University (effective July 1, 2010). Previously, she was a senior lecturer of creative writing in the department of English at Yale University, where she taught Advanced Fiction Writing, Writing for Television, and Writing for Children.

Bloom has written articles in periodicals including The New Yorker, The New York Times Magazine, the Atlantic Monthly, Vogue, Slate, and Salon.com. Her short fiction has appeared in The Best American Short Stories, The O. Henry Prize Stories and several other anthologies, and has won a National Magazine Award. In 1993, Bloom was nominated for the National Book Award for Fiction for Come to Me: Stories and in 2000 was a finalist for the National Book Critics Circle Award for A Blind Man Can See How Much I Love You. Bloom published her first nonfiction book, Normal: Transsexual CEOs, Crossdressing Cops, and Hermaphrodites with Attitude in 2002.

Having undergone training as a clinical social worker at the Smith College School for Social Work, Bloom used her understanding of psychotherapy in creating the 2007 Lifetime Television network TV show, State of Mind, which looked at the professional lives of psychotherapists. She is listed as creator, co-executive producer, and head writer for the series.

In August 2012, Bloom published her first children's book, entitled Little Sweet Potato (HarperCollins). According to The New York Times, the story "follows the trials of a 'lumpy, dumpy, bumpy' young tuber who is accidentally expelled from his garden patch and must find a new home. On his journey, he is castigated first by a bunch of xenophobic carrots, then by a menacing gang of vain eggplants."

== Personal life ==
Bloom currently resides in Connecticut. Though sometimes referred to as a cousin of literary critic Harold Bloom, she says their "cousinhood is entirely artificial and volitional".

She has been married to two men and was in a relationship with a woman named Joy Johannessen for over a decade in between. She has three children with her first husband, James Donald Moon. Her sister, Ellen Bloom, is married to physicist Michael Lubell. The assisted death of her second husband, Brian Ameche, following his Alzheimer's diagnosis is the subject of her memoir, In Love: A Memoir of Love and Loss.

Her father was the freelance writer Murray Teigh Bloom, a founder and former president of the American Society of Journalists and Authors.

== Works ==
=== Fiction ===
==== Novels ====
- Love Invents Us (1997) ISBN 0679441093
- Away (2007) ISBN 9780812977790
- Lucky Us (2014) ISBN 9780812978940
- White Houses (2018) ISBN 9780812985696
- I'll Be Right Here (2025) ISBN 9781984801722

==== Short stories ====
- Come to Me: Stories (1993) ISBN 9780060995140
- A Blind Man Can See How Much I Love You: Stories (2000) ISBN 9780375705571
- The Story (2006) ISBN 9780060182366
- Where the God of Love Hangs Out (2009) ISBN 9780812977806
- Rowing to Eden: Collected Stories (2015) ISBN 9781783782154

=== Non-fiction ===
- Normal: Transsexual CEOs, Cross-dressing Cops, and Hermaphrodites with Attitude (2002)
- In Love: A Memoir of Love and Loss (2022)

=== Screenplays, teleplays and television shows ===
- State of Mind (2007)
- In Love (TBA)
