= In Love (film) =

- Directed by: Paul Weitz
- Screenplay by: Amy Bloom; Paul Weitz
- Based on: In Love: A Memoir of Love and Loss by Amy Bloom
- Produced by: Eddie Vaisman; Julia Lebedev; Andrew Miano; Paul Weitz; George Clooney; Grant Heslov; Sébastian Raybaud
- Starring: George Clooney; Annette Bening; Jane Fonda
- Production companies: Sight Unseen; Depth of Field; Smokehouse Pictures; Anton
- Country: United States
- Language: English

In Love is an upcoming American romance film directed and co-written by Paul Weitz. It is based on the memoir of the same name by Amy Bloom.

== Premise ==
A couple navigates the reality of the husband being diagnosed with Alzheimer's disease.

== Cast ==
- George Clooney
- Annette Bening
- Jane Fonda

== Production ==
It was announced in October 2025 that George Clooney and Annette Bening were set to star in the film, with Paul Weitz set to direct. Weitz would also co-write the screenplay alongside Amy Bloom, who wrote the memoir the film is based on. Filming had begun throughout New Jersey by October 2026, with Jane Fonda also being a part of the cast.
