= Tax uncertainty =

Tax uncertainty is the term for the economic risk that results when future taxes and tax rates are undetermined. Similar to policy uncertainty, tax uncertainty can impact both individuals and businesses and has been shown in some studies to slow rates of economic growth.

== In the United States ==
Temporary tax measures adopted in the 2000s, commonly referred to as Bush tax cuts, though extended in 2011, were scheduled to expire at the end of 2012. The uncertainty surrounding changes to tax rates, as well as the availability of certain tax deductions and credits, led to many businesses holding off on hiring and reducing spending. Honeywell CEO David Cote cited tax uncertainty as the reason why Honeywell has replaced only one quarter of departing employees in 2012 saying, "The last thing you want is to hire a lot of people and then have to lay them off."

According to a report published by the Stanford Institute for Economic Policy Research financial and tax uncertainty played a significant role in the slow recovery of the U.S. economy because uncertainty had led to a more cautious approach to investments and hiring. In November 2012 the analysis firm Macroeconomic Advisers predicted that, in the absence of a resolution, unemployment would rise to 8.5 percent and the U.S. economy would grow only 1.1 percent in 2013.
