= American Taxpayer Relief Act of 2012 =

Federal law in the United States

- Long title: An act to extend certain tax relief provisions enacted in 2001 and 2003, and to provide for expedited consideration of a bill providing for comprehensive tax reform, and for other purposes.
- Acronyms (colloquial): ATRA
- Enacted by: the 112th United States Congress
- Effective: January 1, 2013

Citations
- Public law: Pub. L. 112–240 (text) (PDF)
- Statutes at Large: 126 Stat. 2313

Legislative history
- Introduced in the House as the "Job Protection and Recession Prevention Act of 2012" (H.R. 8) by Dave Camp (R–MI) on July 24, 2012; Committee consideration by House Ways and Means Committee; Passed the House on August 1, 2012 (256–171); Passed the Senate as the "American Taxpayer Relief Act of 2012" on January 1, 2013 (89–8) with amendment; House agreed to Senate amendment on January 1, 2013 (257–167); Signed into law by President Barack Obama on January 2, 2013

The American Taxpayer Relief Act of 2012 (ATRA) was enacted and passed by the United States Congress on January 1, 2013, and was signed into law by US President Barack Obama the next day. ATRA gave permanence to the lower rates of much of the "Bush tax cuts".

The Act centers on a partial resolution to the US fiscal cliff by addressing the expiration of certain provisions of the Economic Growth and Tax Relief Reconciliation Act of 2001 and the Jobs and Growth Tax Relief Reconciliation Act of 2003 (known together as the "Bush tax cuts"), which had been temporarily extended by the Tax Relief, Unemployment Insurance Reauthorization, and Job Creation Act of 2010. The Act also addressed the activation of the Budget Control Act of 2011's budget sequestration provisions.

A compromise measure, the Act gives permanence to the lower rate of much of the Bush tax cuts, while retaining the higher tax rate at upper income levels that became effective on January 1 due to the expiration of the Bush tax cuts. It also establishes caps on tax deductions and credits for those at upper income levels. It does not tackle federal spending levels to a great extent, rather leaving that for further negotiations and legislation. The American Taxpayer Relief Act passed by a wide majority in the Senate, with both Democrats and Republicans supporting it, while most of the House Republicans opposed it.

== Provisions ==
=== Tax provisions ===
- For individuals with taxable income of $400,000 per year or less ($450,000 for a married couple on a joint tax return, both thresholds to be indexed for inflation after 2013), the tax rates for income, capital gains, and dividends remained at their 2003-2012 levels, instead of reverting to the higher rates from the expiration of the Bush tax cuts.
- For individuals with taxable income over the $400,000/$450,000 thresholds:
  - The top marginal tax rate on income of 39.6%, provided for under the expiration of the 2001 portion of the Bush tax cuts, was retained. This was an increase from the 2003–2012 rate of 35%.
  - The top marginal tax rate on long-term capital gains of 20%, provided for under the expiration of the 2003 portion of the Bush tax cuts, was retained. This was an increase from the 2003–2012 rate of 15%.
  - The top marginal tax rate on dividends, which would have increased to the ordinary income rate of 39.6% due to the expiration of the 2003 portion of the Bush tax cuts, was set to the capital-gains rate of 20%. This was an increase from the 2003–2012 rate of 15%.
- A phase-out of tax deductions and credits for incomes over $250,000 for individuals and $300,000 for couples was reinstated. These limits on deductions had existed before the Bush tax cuts, and had disappeared in 2010.
- Estate taxes were set at 40% of the value above $5,000,000, indexed for inflation, an increase from the 2012 rate of 35% of the value over $5,120,000.
- Changes were made to the Alternative Minimum Tax to permanently index it to inflation and thus to avoid the annual "patch" that was previously required to prevent it from impacting middle-class families.
- The two-year-old cut to payroll taxes was not extended. The rate had been reduced from 6.2% to 4.2% for 2011 and 2012.
- Some tax credits for poorer families were extended for five years, including ones for college tuition and an expansion of the Earned Income Tax Credit.
- A number of corporate tax breaks were extended, including the "active financing" tax exemption for major corporations (cost $9 billion), the New Markets Tax Credit Program (cost $1.365 billion annually), a rum tax supporting Puerto Rico and Virgin Islands rum industry ($547 million in 2009), a tax benefit for NASCAR racetrack owners (around $43 million), tax credits for two- and three-wheeled electric vehicles and hiring of individuals who are members of a Native American tribe.

In all, the bill included $600 billion over ten years in new tax revenue, about one-fifth of the revenue that would have been raised had no legislation been passed. For the tax year 2013, some taxpayers experienced the first year-to-year income-tax rate increase since 1993, although the rate increase came about not as a result of the 2012 Act, but as a result of the expiration of the Bush tax cuts. The new rates for income, capital gains, estates, and the alternative minimum tax would be made permanent.

=== Spending provisions ===
- The budget sequestration created by the Budget Control Act of 2011 was delayed by two months, to give time for further negotiations on deficit reduction. The $24 billion cost would be offset by a provision loosening the rules for 401(k) accounts to be converted into Roth 401(k) plans, requiring taxes to be paid on the assets, as well as a requirement for unspecified cuts of $4 billion for the remainder of FY2013 and another $8 billion in FY 2014.
- The sequestration caps for 2014 were lowered to offset the two-month delay in 2013.
- For 2013 only, certain "security" funding such as homeland security and international affairs were cut in order to lessen the cuts to defense.
- Federal unemployment benefits were extended for a year without a budget offset elsewhere, a cost of $30 billion.
- The Medicare "doc fix", suspending reductions in physician payments to conform to the Medicare Sustainable Growth Rate, was extended for one year.
- A pay freeze for members of Congress was extended, but a general pay freeze for government workers was not.
- Some portions of the farm bill that had expired in September were extended for nine months, but without changes supported by dairy farmers and legislators.

== Legislative history ==
Senate vote by state 2 Democratic Yeses 1 Democratic Yes and 1 Republican Yes 2 Republican Yeses 1 Democratic Yes and 1 Republican not voting 1 Democratic Yes and 1 Democratic not voting 1 Republican Yes and 1 Republican not voting 1 Democratic Yes and 1 Democratic No 1 Democratic Yes and 1 Republican No 1 Republican Yes and 1 Republican No 1 Democratic No and 1 Republican No

House vote by district Democratic Yes Republican Yes Democratic No Republican No Not voting Vacant

The passage of the bill came after days of negotiations between Senate leaders and the Obama administration, with the final agreement being attributed to talks between Vice President Joe Biden and Senate Minority Leader Mitch McConnell. Some Democrats criticized the bill for not raising taxes on the wealthy more, while Republicans criticized it for raising tax rates while not providing explicit spending cuts. The final actions on the bill came during Congressional sessions on New Year's Eve and New Year's Day.

At around 2 a.m. EST on January 1, 2013, the Senate passed the bill, by a margin of 89–8. 49 Democrats (and Democratic-caucusing Independents) and 40 Republicans voted in favor while 3 Democrats and 5 Republicans voted against.

The prospect was raised that the House would pass an amended bill that included $300 billion in spending cuts. But it was determined to be unlikely that the Senate would vote on any amended legislation before the end of the 112th Congress at noon on January 3, 2013 (all legislation under consideration expires at the end of each Congress), and failure to pass a bill and thus prolong the time over the cliff was seen as politically disadvantageous by the Republican leadership, and so the House moved towards a vote the same day.

The House passed the bill without amendments by a margin of 257–167 at about 11 p.m. EST on January 1, 2013. 85 Republicans and 172 Democrats voted in favor while 151 Republicans and 16 Democrats were opposed.

House Speaker John Boehner voted for the bill, a break from the usual custom of the speaker not voting at all. The action by the House in bringing the bill up was itself a break from the normal "Hastert rule" as well, in that a majority of the majority Republican caucus did not support it.

The House's passage brought to a close what the Associated Press called "Congress' excruciating, extraordinary New Year's Day approval of a compromise averting a prolonged tumble off the fiscal cliff." Minutes later, the president flew back to Hawaii to rejoin his family for their holiday vacation. Obama signed the official copy of the bill by autopen from there late on January 2, 2013.

== CBO scoring ==
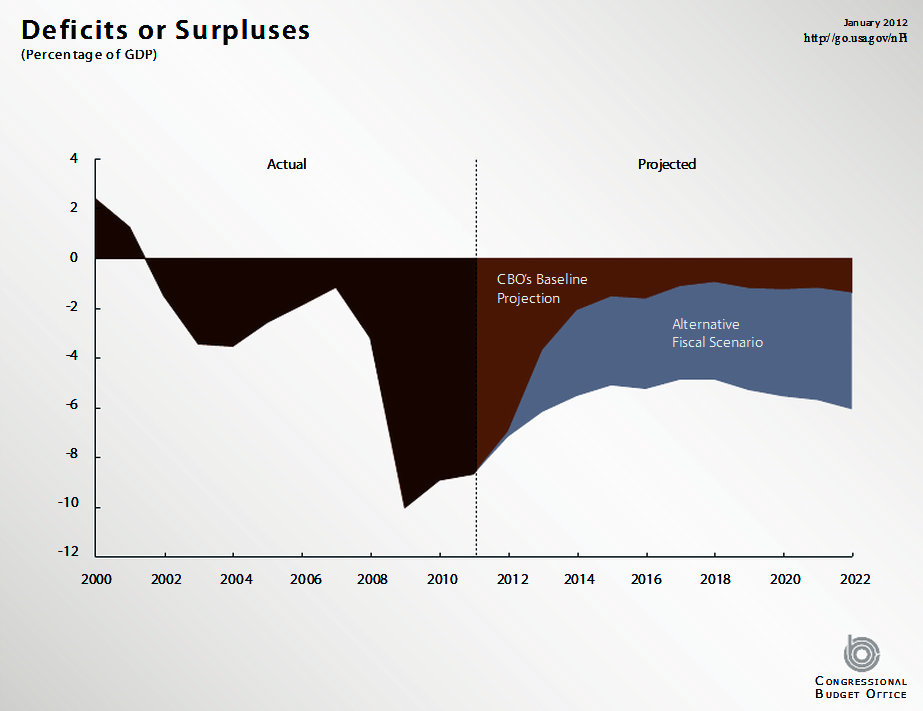
Budget deficits, projected through 2022. The "CBO Baseline" (in red) assumed significant deficit reduction due to the expiration of the Bush tax cuts and implementation of spending cuts under the Budget Control Act of 2011. The "Alternative Scenario" (in blue) did not. The American Taxpayer Relief Act of 2012 deficit path is slightly below the Alternative scenario.

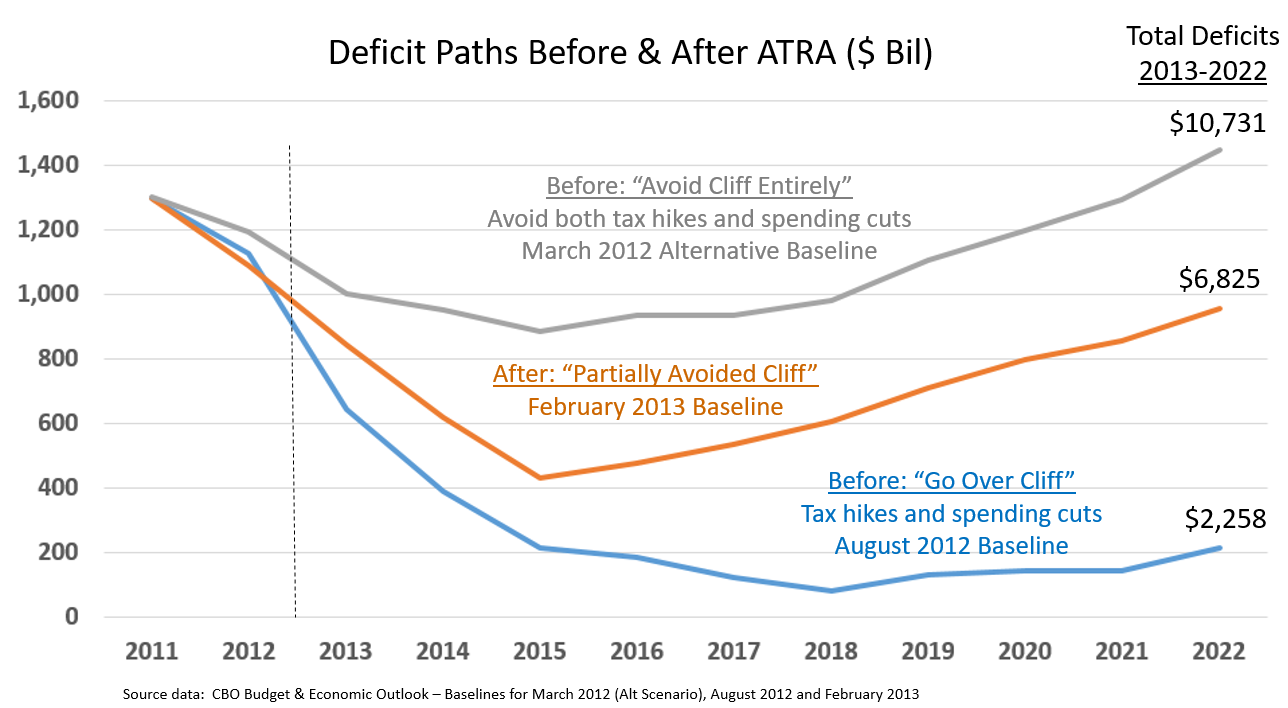
Three CBO deficit scenarios related to the American Taxpayer Relief Act of 2012 (ATRA) and the Fiscal Cliff. The blue line (August 2012 baseline) was the "current law" baseline, with tax increases and spending cuts that would take effect if laws were not changed. The grey line (March 2012 alternative baseline) was the "current policy" baseline, which represented the avoidance of the tax increases and spending cuts. The orange line (February 2013 baseline) was the post-ATRA result.

The Congressional Budget Office (CBO) analyzes the effects of legislation on the deficit and economy. Describing the effects of the American Taxpayer Relief Act (ATRA) depends on which baseline is used in comparison.

- Compared against 2012, the deficit in 2013 will be moderately lower due to additional tax revenue from higher payroll tax rates on all wage-earning taxpayers and higher income tax rates on wealthier taxpayers. Economic growth in 2013 will be slower due to deficit reduction in the short-run.
- Compared against the CBO's "Baseline Scenario" (which assumes significant deficit reduction due to the expiration of the Bush tax cuts at all income levels, expiration of payroll tax cuts and implementation of spending cuts), ATRA raises the deficit considerably over the 2013–2022 period. Economic growth will be faster in the short-run due to higher deficits but slower in the long-run due to higher debt levels.
- Compared against the CBO's "Alternative Scenario" (which assumes limited deficit reduction due to extension of the Bush tax cuts at all levels and no substantial cuts in spending), ATRA improves the deficit moderately over the 2013–2022 period. Economic growth would be slower in the short-run due to lower deficits but faster in the long-run due to lower debt levels.

=== Ten-year projections 2013–2022 ===
The CBO reported its estimates of the budgetary effects of ATRA on January 1, 2013. These effects were measured relative to the CBO's March 2012 "Baseline scenario", which assumed significant deficit reduction due to the expiration of the Bush tax cuts and implementation of spending cuts under the Budget Control Act of 2011.

- Revenue provisions would add a total of $3,638 billion to the deficits for the 2013–2022 period, an average of $364 billion per year. The baseline assumed the income tax cuts would expire at all income levels, so only raising income tax rates for higher income taxpayers causes the deficits to rise substantially relative to the baseline.
- Spending provisions would add $332 billion to the deficit for the 2013–2022 period, an average of $33 billion per year. The baseline assumed a series of significant spending cuts under the Budget Control Act of 2011 would take effect, so delaying or avoiding them increases the deficit relative to the baseline. The CBO's analysis assumes most of the spending reductions in the Budget Control Act ($1.2 trillion over a decade) or the equivalent will still occur.
- The total deficits for the 2013–2022 period would be increased by $3,971 billion relative to the baseline.

CBO's March 2012 "Baseline scenario" assumed the total deficits for the 2013–2022 period would be $2,887 billion. Debt held by the public (a partial measure of the national debt) at the end of 2022 would be $15,115 billion, resulting in a ratio of debt held by the public to GDP of 61.3%. The ratio was projected to be 73.2% in 2012. Applying the amounts in the ATRA to the baseline (a rough approximation pending further CBO scoring), passage of the ATRA raises the:

- Total deficit estimate for the 2013–2022 period by $3,971 billion, from $2,887 billion to $6,858 billion;
- Debt held by the public in 2022 by $3,971 billion, from $15,115 billion to $19,086 billion; and
- Ratio of debt held by the public to GDP in 2022 by 16.1 percentage points, from 61.3% to 77.4%, assuming no change in 2022 GDP.

For comparison, the CBO's "Alternative Scenario", which assumed the Bush tax cuts would be extended and the spending cuts in the Budget Control Act avoided, assumed $10,731 billion in cumulative deficits during the 2013–2022 period. The ATRA results in $6,858 billion in cumulative deficits, roughly splitting the difference between the two scenarios. In other words, ATRA improves the deficit picture relative to the Alternative scenario, but worsens it relative to the Baseline scenario.

CBO separately indicated in January 2013 that $600 billion in additional interest costs over the 2013–2022 period were not included in their initial assessment discussed above. This increases the deficit estimate from $6,858 billion (Baseline scenario with ATRA adjustment above) to $7,458 billion. This additional interest cost arises due to higher deficits relative to the Baseline. While ATRA would reduce short-term economic impact due to the cliff, it would slow long-term growth relative to the lower deficit Baseline scenario.

=== 2012 to 2013 changes ===
The CBO's August 2012 "Baseline scenario" assumed revenue would increase from $2,435 billion in 2012 to $2,913 billion in 2013, an increase of $478 billion or 19.63%. It also assumed spending would decline from $3,563 billion in 2012 to $3,554 billion in 2013, a decrease of $9 billion or -0.25%. The deficit was projected to be $641 billion in 2013, significantly below the 2012 deficit of $1,128 billion.

The CBO's January 1, 2013 analysis of ATRA included adjustments to the Baseline scenario for 2013 of -$280 billion in revenues and +$50 billion in spending. This lowers the 2013 Baseline revenue projection from $2,913 to $2,633 billion, an increase of $198 billion or 8.13% versus 2012 revenues of $2,435 billion, while raising the 2013 spending from $3,554 billion to $3,604 billion, an increase of $41 billion or 1.15% versus 2012 spending of $3,563 billion. After adjusting for these changes, the deficit was projected to be $971 billion in 2013 instead of the $641 billion projected prior to ATRA, an increase of $330 billion. Both deficit projections were below the 2012 deficit of $1,128 billion by $157 billion and $487 billion, respectively.

== Analysis and reaction ==
The Wall Street Journal reported that the bill's tax provisions "represented the largest tax increase in the past two decades", based on the year-to-year increase in tax rates from 2012 to 2013. However, Dave Camp, the Republican chair of the House Ways and Means Committee, called the same provisions the "largest tax cut in American history", referring to the fact that the bill's tax rates replace much higher rates for 2013 that were provided for in the laws previously in effect.

In a news analysis piece, The New York Times wrote that "Just a few years ago, the tax deal pushed through Congress ... would have been a Republican fiscal fantasy, a sweeping bill that locks in virtually all of the Bush-era tax cuts, exempts almost all estates from taxation, and enshrines the former president's credo that dividends and capital gains should be taxed equally and gently. But times have changed, President George W. Bush is gone, and before the bill's final passage ... House Republican leaders struggled all day to quell a revolt among caucus members who threatened to blow up a hard-fought compromise that they could have easily framed as a victory."

The Committee for a Responsible Federal Budget said that the bill avoided most of the economic harm from the fiscal cliff and set useful precedents regarding paying for the sequester and doc fix but failed to include any serious entitlement reforms, enact serious spending cuts, or stabilize the debt as a share of the economy. The president of The Peter G. Peterson Foundation said the fiscal cliff agreement "was a significant missed opportunity to put the nation on a sustainable fiscal path." The Washington Post's editorial board said "the bill's enactment is far better than a failure by this Congress to act before it adjourns" but complained that "lawmakers seem to have gotten as close as they could to doing the bare minimum."

Economist Paul Krugman wrote that ATRA allowed liberals to avoid spending cuts or entitlement reform, while conservatives allowed income tax rate increases for the first time since 1993. Krugman believed that Obama should have bargained harder for more revenue. He also estimated that another 2% GDP in annual deficit reduction would be required over the long run to stabilize the debt situation.
