= Middle Class Tax Relief and Job Creation Act of 2012 =

United States federal taxation law

The Middle Class Tax Relief and Job Creation Act of 2012 (Pub. L. 112–96 (text) (PDF), H.R. 3630, 126 Stat. 156, enacted February 22, 2012), also known as the "payroll tax cut", was an Act of the United States Congress. The bill was passed by the U.S. House of Representatives on February 17, 2012 by a vote of 293‑132, and by the Senate by a vote of 60‑36 on the same day. The bill was signed into law by President Barack Obama on February 22, 2012.

== Policy implications ==
The Act:

- Extends Medicare payments to doctors, giving seniors the advantage to keep their doctors
- Extends the two percent Social Security payroll tax cut for one year (first enacted for 2011)
- Extends unemployment benefits
  - Amendments were made to Title III of the Social Security Act mandating that states' unemployment compensation laws to require that the unemployment compensation claimant be both able and available to work and to verify that an individual is actively seeking work.
  - The Internal Revenue Code and the Social Security Act Title III now also require states to reduce their current unemployment to recover previous incidents of overpayment.
  - An extension of The Assistance for Unemployed Workers and Struggling Families Act has been granted until December 31, 2012. The federal government pays for 100% of Emergency Unemployment Compensation (EUC) via allocation of money to the states for dispersal.
  - Amendments were also made to the Railroad Unemployment Insurance Act until December 31, 2012, temporarily extending unemployment benefits for those with 10 or more years and fewer than 10 years of service to a railroad company. Greater benefits are to be granted to those who have worked more than 10 years when compared to those who have worked less than 10 years.
  - Allows temporary federal matching of compensation equal to payments to individuals received by states with no additional waiting period.
  - The authorization of the Emergency Unemployment Compensation (EUC) program is extended through January 2, 2013, at up to 89 or 99 weeks until May 2012 depending on the state, up to 79 weeks through August, and up to 73 weeks through December. This provision is expected to cost $30 billion.
- Calls for an establishment of a national public safety broadband network to:
  - Expand high-speed wireless broadband
  - Improve communications interoperability among first responders
- Changes the law concerning spectrum reallocation auctions and studies spectrum usage
- Increases the 2012 deficit by $101.1 billion according to the CBO
- Expands Federal Emergency Management Agency aid
- Studies "Next Generation" 9-1-1 services and makes certain protections
- Calls for federal drug testing for drug related employees
  - Eligibility for benefits is based upon "fact or cause" of unemployment. An individual is required to take a drug test if and only if the individual was fired from their most recent place of employment because of the use of controlled substances or the individual's only suitable work involves employment that regularly performs drug testing according to regulations issued by the Secretary of Labor.
- Extends Temporary Assistance for Needy Families (TANF)
- Reduces federal deficit over 11 years
- Extends job incentives to small businesses
- Improves work search for the long unemployed
  - Even if a state passes a law that would modify the procedure of calculating regular compensation so that the mean weekly benefit amount of regular compensation payable on or after June 2, 2010, will be less than the benefit that otherwise would be payable in that time under state law, a federal-state EUC agreement is still effective for the state. The "nonreduction rule" declares that a federal-state EUC agreement shall not apply, or will cease to apply, to a state that does this.
- Federal Employee Retirement Changes
  - The Conference Agreement included in this bill states that contributions by all federal civilian employees entering service after December 31, 2012, who have less than five years of creditable civilian service (revised annuity employees), will be subject to a 2.3% increase in their retirement annuity, a sharp increase from the current 0.8%. Increases in employee contributions are to be made for employees into their pensions and no change would be made to pension benefits. Additionally, members of Congress and congressional employees who begin their service after December 31, 2012, with less than 5 years of civilian service would be subject to this rule as well. This provision is expected to raise approximately $15 billion in the next eleven years.
- Mandates study of changes to:
  - Utilization of Amateur Radio in emergencies
  - Federal regulation of private land use restrictions on amateur antennas
- Creation of the Short-time Compensation Program
  - Also known as the Layoff Prevention Act of 2012, this requires short-time compensation programs that allow employers to shorten a work week of an employee instead of laying them off. In addition, the Secretary of Labor must now distribute grants to states that enact these programs, develop legislation for use by states to develop, enact, and implement these programs, and update Congress and the President on their status.

== Legislative history ==
This bill was sponsored by Representative Dave Camp (R) of Michigan on December 9, 2011, at which time it was called the Temporary Payroll Tax Cut Continuation Act of 2011. The original bill passed the House 234-193 on December 13, 2011, and the Senate unanimously on December 17, 2011. On December 23, 2011, the House and Senate passed H.R. 3765, also called the Temporary Payroll Tax Cut Continuation Act of 2011, and President Obama signed it the same day. The bill's effect was to extend lower payroll tax rates past December 31, 2011, when they would have expired.

The Social Security tax rate would have increased from 4.2% to 6.2%, had the bill not passed. The rate would have applied to the first $110,100 in income. However, under the Senate version of the bill, the temporary tax cut applied to only one-sixth of that income amount, or $18,350, since the income would have to be earned in the first two months of 2012. Under the House version, persons earning far more than $110,100 a year would have received the full benefit in the two months.

A conference committee resolved the differences between the House version and the Senate version on February 17, 2012, and the conference report was approved by the House and the Senate.
