= Michael Lubell =

American physicist

- Education: Columbia University (BA); Yale University (PhD)
- Spouse: Ellen Bloom
- Scientific career
- Fields: Physics
- Workplaces: Yale University; City College of New York

Michael S. Lubell is an American physicist. He is the Mark W. Zemansky Professor of Physics at the City College of New York.

== Biography ==
Lubell received his B.A. from Columbia University and his M.S. and Ph.D. from Yale University. He taught at Yale from 1971 to 1981 before joining the faculty of CCNY. He served as department chair of CCN Y's physics department for six and half years. His research has ranged from atomic, molecular, and optical physics to science and technology policy.

Lubell also held visiting professorships at the Brookhaven National Laboratory, the University of Texas-Austin, Bielefeld University and the Kavli Institute. He is a fellow of the American Physical Society and the American Association for the Advancement of Science.

Lubell is most known for being the director of public affairs of the American Physical Society and one of the most visible spokespersons of the scientific community in Washington D.C. He has formed coalitions with other scientific groups to advocate on behalf of increasing federal funding for science research. Critical of President Donald Trump's policies, he was, however, removed from office a few days after the APS delivered a congratulatory message to Trump and urged him "to make sustained and robust funding of scientific research a top priority."

== Personal life and family ==
Lubell's father was Richard M. Lubell, a former deputy New York City Superintendent of Schools. He is married to Ellen Bloom, daughter of journalist and freelance writer Murray Teigh Bloom, a founder and former president of the American Society of Journalists and Authors. His sister-in-law is the writer and psychotherapist Amy Bloom.
