= Zandi =

Zandi (Persian: زندی; Kurdish: زەندی, romanized: Zendî) is a surname. Notable people with the surname include:

- Abolfazl Zandi, Iranian taekwondo practitioner
- Ferydoon Zandi (born 1979), Iranian-German soccer player
- Jalil Zandi, ace fighter pilot in the Islamic Republic of Iran Air Force
- Maryam Zandi (born 1947), Iranian photographer
- Mediya Zandi, Kurdish radio presenter and writer, wife of Hassan Zirak
- Mona Zandi-Haqiqi, Iranian film director
- Roya Zandi, American biophysicist
- Zandi family (United States):
  - Iraj Zandi, Iranian-American professor
  - Mark Zandi, Iranian-American economist
  - Zach Zandi, American soccer player

== See also ==
- Zand dynasty
