= Economic policy of the George W. Bush administration =

The economic policy and legacy of the George W. Bush administration was characterized by significant income tax cuts in 2001 and 2003, the implementation of Medicare Part D in 2003, increased military spending for two wars, a housing bubble that contributed to the subprime mortgage crisis of 2007–2008, and the Great Recession that followed. Economic performance during the period was adversely affected by two recessions, in 2001 and 2007–2009.

== Overview ==
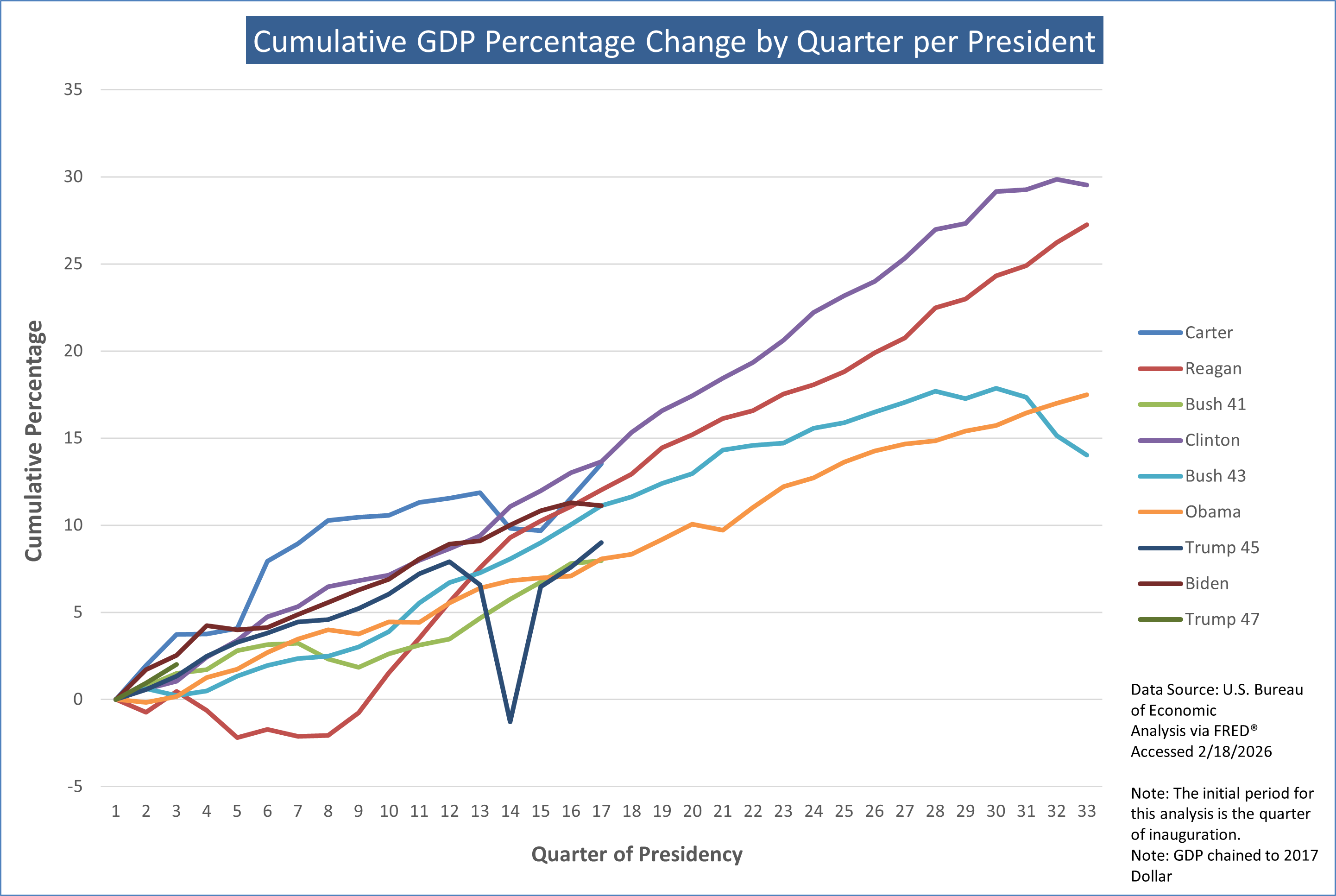
U.S. cumulative real (inflation-adjusted) GDP growth by President

President Bush was in office from January 2001 to January 2009, a complex and challenging economic and budgetary time. In addition to two recessions (2001 and the Great Recession of 2007–2009), the U.S. faced a housing bubble and bust, two wars, and the rise of Asian competitors, mainly China, which entered the World Trade Organization (WTO) in December 2001.

According to the National Bureau of Economic Research, the economy suffered from a recession that lasted from March 2001 to November 2001. During the Bush Administration, Real GDP has grown at an average annual rate of 2.5%.

During his first term (2001–2005), President Bush sought and obtained congressional approval for the Bush tax cuts, which mainly comprised the Economic Growth and Tax Relief Reconciliation Act of 2001 (EGTRRA) and the Jobs and Growth Tax Relief Reconciliation Act of 2003 (JGTRRA). These acts decreased many income tax rates, reduced the capital gains tax, increased the child tax credit and eliminated the so-called "marriage penalty", and were set to expire in 2010, while increasing federal deficits by an estimated 1.5% to 2.0% GDP each year. Among the many stated rationales for the large income tax cuts of 2001 and 2003 was the 2001 recession, which followed the bursting of the Dot-com bubble in late 2000 and early 2001. Further, some influential conservatives such as Alan Greenspan believed that the nearly $5 trillion in budget surpluses forecast by the CBO for the 2002-2011 period should be given back to taxpayers rather than used to pay down the national debt.

The U.S. responded the September 11, 2001 attacks with the invasion of Afghanistan shortly thereafter. The invasion of Iraq followed in 2003. Military expenditures approximately doubled in nominal dollars to pay for these wars, rising from around $300 billion in 2001 to $600 billion in 2008.

While President Bush generally continued the deregulatory approach of his predecessor President Clinton, an important exception was the Sarbanes–Oxley Act of 2002, which followed high-profile corporate scandals at Enron, World Com, and Tyco International, among others. It required auditors to be more independent of the firms they audit, corporations to rigorously test their financial reporting controls, and top executives to attest to the accuracy of corporate financial statements, among many other measures.

Regarding entitlement programs, President Bush signed Medicare Part D into law in 2003, significantly expanding that program, although without new sources of tax revenue. However, an attempt to privatize the Social Security program was unsuccessful in his second term.

His second term (2005–2009) was characterized by the housing bubble peak and bust, followed by the worsening subprime mortgage crisis and Great Recession. Responses to the crisis included the $700 billion TARP program to bail out damaged financial institutions, loans to help bail out the auto industry crisis, and bank debt guarantees. The vast majority of these funds were later recovered, as banks and auto companies paid back the government.

Economic performance overall suffered as a result of the 2001 and 2007–2009 recessions. Real GDP growth averaged 1.8% from Q1 2001 to Q4 2008. Job creation averaged 95,000 private sector jobs per month, measured from February 2001 to January 2009, the least of any president since 1970. Job creation during the 2001–2007 period was slow by historical standards and arguably unsustainable, as nearly all the net job creation was reversed during the subsequent Great Recession. The employment recoveries from both the 2001 and 2007–2009 recessions were protracted; the peak employment level for private sector workers in January 2008 was not regained until 2014. Income inequality continued to worsen pre-tax (a trend since 1980) and was accelerated after-tax by the Bush tax cuts, which dis-proportionally benefited higher-income taxpayers, who pay the majority of income taxes.

The U.S. national debt grew significantly from 2001 to 2009, both in dollar terms and relative to the size of the economy (GDP), due to a combination of tax cuts, wars and recessions. Measured for fiscal years 2001–2008, Federal spending under President Bush averaged 19.0% of GDP, just below his predecessor President Bill Clinton at 19.2% GDP, although tax receipts were substantially lower at 17.1% GDP versus 18.4% GDP. Income tax revenues averaged 7.7% GDP under Bush, versus 8.5% GDP under Clinton. The sizable national debt increases during his administration represented a reversal from a sizable surplus projection by the Congressional Budget Office just prior to his taking office.

As of 2017, a major legacy of President Bush's economic policy was his tax cuts, which were extended indefinitely by President Obama for roughly the bottom 99% of taxpayers, or about 80% of the value of the tax cuts.

== Tax policy ==
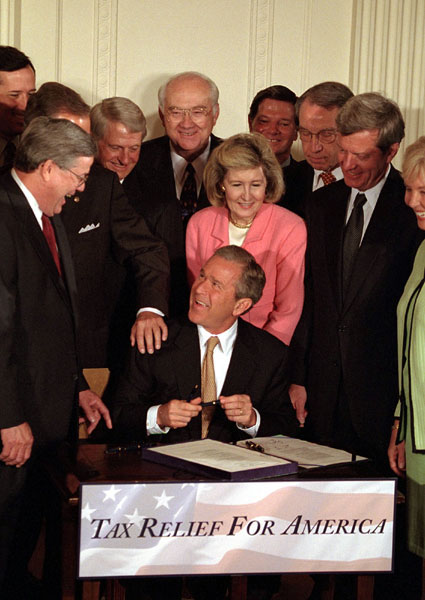
President Bush signing the Economic Growth and Tax Relief Reconciliation Act of 2001 in the White House East Room on June 7, 2001

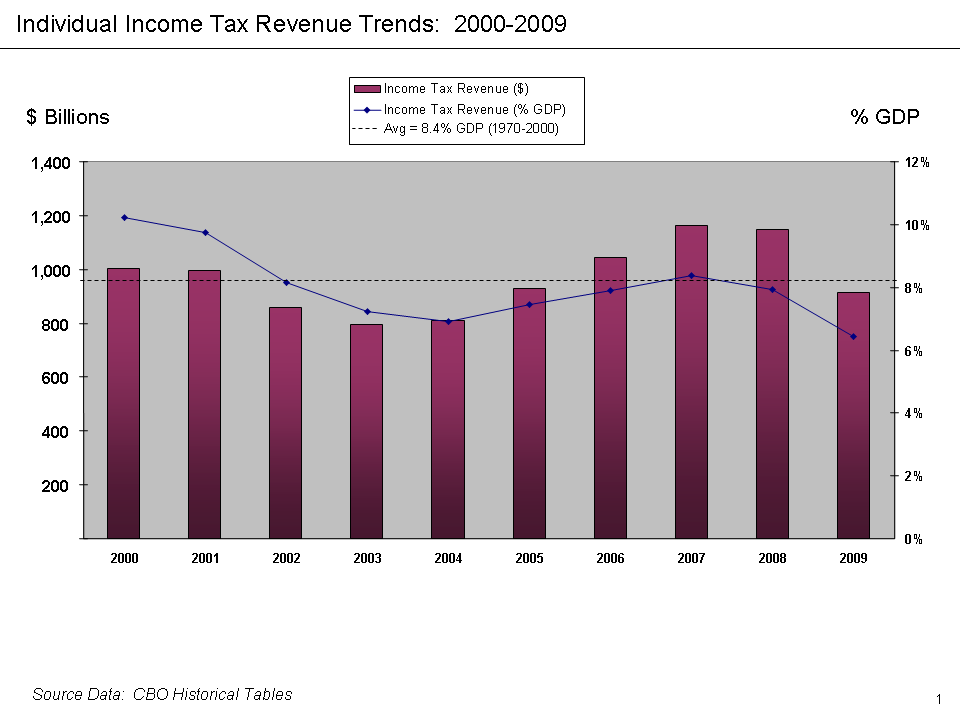
CBO data - Federal individual income tax revenue trends from 2000 to 2009 (dollars and % GDP)

=== 2001 tax cut ===
Between 2001 and 2003, the Bush administration instituted a federal tax cut for all taxpayers. Among other changes, the lowest income tax rate decreased from 15% to 10%, the 27% rate went to 25%, the 30% rate went to 28%, the 35% rate went to 33%, and the top marginal tax rate went from 39.6% to 35%. In addition, the child tax credit went from $500 to $1000, and the "marriage penalty" reduced. Since the cuts got implemented as part of the annual congressional budget resolution, which protected the bill from filibusters, numerous amendments, and more than 20 hours of debate, it had to include a sunset clause. Unless congress passed legislation making the tax cuts permanent, they were to expire after the 2010 tax year.

Facing opposition in Congress for an initially proposed $1.6 trillion tax cut (over ten years), Bush held town hall-style public meetings across the nation in 2001 to increase public support for it. Bush and some of his economic advisers argued that unspent government funds had to be returned to taxpayers. With reports of the threat of recession, Federal Reserve Chairman Alan Greenspan said tax cuts could work but must be offset with spending cuts.

Bush argued that such a tax cut would stimulate the economy and create jobs. Ultimately, five Senate Democrats crossed party lines to join Republicans in approving a $1.35 trillion tax cut program — one of the largest in U.S. history.

=== 2003 cuts and later ===
The United States Congress passed the Jobs and Growth Tax Relief Reconciliation Act of 2003 (JGTRRA) on May 23, 2003, and President George W. Bush signed it into law five days later. Nearly all of the cuts (individual rates, capital gains, dividends, estate tax) were to expire after 2010.

Among other provisions, the act accelerated certain tax changes passed in the Economic Growth and Tax Relief Reconciliation Act of 2001, increased the exemption amount for the individual Alternative Minimum Tax, and lowered taxes of income from dividends and capital gains. JGTRRA continued on the precedent established by the 2001 EGTRRA, while increasing tax reductions on investment income from dividends and capital gains. JGTRRA accelerated the gradual rate reduction and increase in credits passed in EGTRRA. The maximum tax rate decreases originally scheduled to be phased into effect in 2006 under EGTRRA were retroactively enacted to apply to the 2003 tax year. Also, the child tax credit increased to what would have been the 2010 level, and "marriage penalty" relief accelerated to 2009 levels. In addition, the threshold at which the alternative minimum tax applies was also increased. JGTRRA increased both the percentage rate at which items are depreciated and the amount a taxpayer may choose to expense under Section 179, allowing them to deduct the full cost of the item from their income without having to depreciate the amount.

In addition, the capital gains tax decreased from rates of 8%, 10%, and 20% to 5% and 15%. Capital gains taxes for those currently paying 5% (in this instance, those in the 10% and 15% income tax brackets) are scheduled for elimination in 2008. However, capital gains taxes remain at the regular income tax rate for property held less than one year. Certain categories, such as collectibles, remained taxed at existing rates, with a 28% cap. In addition, taxes on "qualified dividends" reduced to the capital gains levels. "Qualified dividends" includes most income from non-foreign corporations, real estate investment trusts, and credit union and bank "dividends" nominally interest.

=== CBO scoring ===
The non-partisan Congressional Budget Office has consistently reported that the Bush tax cuts (EGTRRA and JGTRRA) did not pay for themselves and represented a sizable decline in revenue for the Treasury:

- The CBO estimated in June 2012 that the Bush tax cuts of 2001 (EGTRRA) and 2003 (JGTRRA) added approximately $1.5 trillion total to the debt over the 2002-2011 decade, excluding interest.
- The CBO estimated in January 2009 that the Bush tax cuts would add approximately $3.0 trillion to the debt over the 2010-2019 decade if fully extended at all income levels, including interest.
- The CBO estimated in January 2009 that extending the Bush tax cuts at all income levels over the 2011-2019 period would increase the annual deficit by an average of 1.7% GDP, reaching 2.0% GDP in 2018 and 2019.

=== Commentary on the Bush tax cuts ===
House Minority Leader Richard Gephardt said the middle class will not benefit enough from the tax cut and the wealthy will reap unfairly high benefits. Senate Majority Leader Tom Daschle argued that the tax cut is too large, too generous to the rich and too expensive.

Economists, including the Treasury Secretary at the time Paul O'Neill and 450 economists, including ten Nobel prize laureates, who contacted Bush in 2003, opposed the 2003 tax cuts on the grounds that they would fail as a growth stimulus, increase inequality and worsen the budget outlook considerably (see Economists' statement opposing the Bush tax cuts). Some argued the effects of the tax cuts have been as promised as revenues actually increased (although income tax revenues fell), the recession of 2001 ended relatively quickly, and economic growth was positive.

The tax cuts had been largely opposed by American economists, including the Bush administration's own Economic Advisement Council. In 2003, 450 economists, including ten Nobel Prize laureate, signed the Economists' statement opposing the Bush tax cuts, sent to President Bush stating that "these tax cuts will worsen the long-term budget outlook... will reduce the capacity of the government to finance Social Security and Medicare benefits as well as investments in schools, health, infrastructure, and basic research... [and] generate further inequalities in after-tax income."

The Bush administration had claimed, based on the concept of the Laffer Curve, that the tax cuts actually paid for the themselves by generating enough extra revenue from additional economic growth to offset the lower taxation rates. However, income tax revenues in dollar terms did not regain their FY 2000 peak until 2006. Through the end of 2008, total federal tax revenues relative to GDP had yet to regain their 2000 peak although it was increasingly between 2004 and 2007.

When asked whether the Bush tax cuts had generated more revenue, Arthur Laffer stated that he did not know. However, he did say that the tax cuts were "what was right," because after the September 11 attacks and threats of recession, Bush "needed to stimulate the economy and spend for defense."

Critics indicate that the tax revenues would have been considerably higher if the tax cuts had not been made. Income tax revenues in dollar terms did not regain their FY 2000 peak until 2006. The Congressional Budget Office (CBO) has estimated that extending the 2001 and 2003 tax cuts (which were scheduled to expire in 2010) would cost the U.S. Treasury nearly $1.8 trillion in the following decade, dramatically increasing federal deficits.

The Tax Policy Center reported that the various tax cuts under the Bush administration were "extraordinarily expensive" to the Treasury:

The congressional Joint Committee on Taxation calculated a score, or revenue change, for each of the seven major tax cut bills passed during the Bush administration: their combined cost sums to over $2.0 trillion from 2001 to 2017. Extending these tax cuts into the future would carry a similar cost: the Congressional Budget Office (CBO) recently estimated the cost of extending them through 2017 at $1.9 trillion, not counting the costs of debt service, and not counting the cost of indexing the alternative minimum tax (AMT) to inflation to prevent it from undoing much of the cuts...if one takes into account the direct effects of the tax cuts, extra interest payments, and the extra "interaction" cost of reforming the AMT while extending the Bush tax cuts, the combined cost of extending the tax cuts through 2017 adds up to $2.8 trillion.

=== Impact on inequality ===
Federal income taxes (distinct from payroll taxes) are paid overwhelmingly by the highest income taxpayers. For example, in 2014, the top 1% of income earners paid 45.7% of federal income taxes; the bottom 80% of earners paid 15%. Therefore, policies that reduce income tax rates, such as the Bush tax cuts, dis-proportionally benefit the rich, as they pay the lion's share of the taxes. During President Bush's terms, income inequality grew, a trend since 1980. CBO reported that the share of after-tax income received by the top 1% rose from 12.3% in 2001 to a peak of 16.7% in 2007, before ending at 14.1% in 2008. Comparing 2001 and 2008, the lowest and highest quintiles of the income distribution had a larger share of the after-tax income, while the middle three quintiles had a lower share.

Further, income inequality can be measured both before-tax and after-tax, so the Bush tax cuts primarily impacted the latter measurements. President Bush did not take deliberate steps to address pre-tax inequality, which involves policies such as raising the minimum wage, strengthening collective bargaining power (unions), limiting executive pay, and protectionism. CBO reported that the top 1% paid an average total federal tax rate of 32.5% in 2000, 30.1% in 2004, and 28.2% in 2008. The top 1% paid an average federal income tax rate of 24.5% in 2000 and 20.4% in 2008.

In terms of increasing inequality, the effect of Bush's tax cuts on the upper, middle and lower class is contentious. Some economists argue that the cuts have benefited the nation's richest households at the expense of the middle and lower class, while libertarians and conservatives have claimed that tax cuts have benefitted all taxpayers. Economists Peter Orszag and William Gale described the Bush tax cuts as reverse government redistribution of wealth, "[shifting] the burden of taxation away from upper-income, capital-owning households and toward the wage-earning households of the lower and middle classes."

This would suggest that the Bush tax cut policy was highly regressive, but some writers, notably at the Koch-funded Tax Foundation, argue that the concept of a progressive tax should be detached from its traditional association with income redistribution, noting that since the share of income of the most wealthy rose so much during the period, their share of the total tax burden went up even as their tax rates went down. Between 2003 and 2004, following the 2003 tax cuts, the share of after-tax income going to the top 1% rose from 12.2% in 2003 to 14.0% in 2004. (This followed the period from 2000 to 2002, where after-tax incomes declined the most for the top 1%.) At the same time, the share of overall tax liabilities of the top 1% increased from 22.9% to 25.3%,. In this way, they claim, the tax system actually became more progressive between 2000 and 2004.

== Defense spending ==
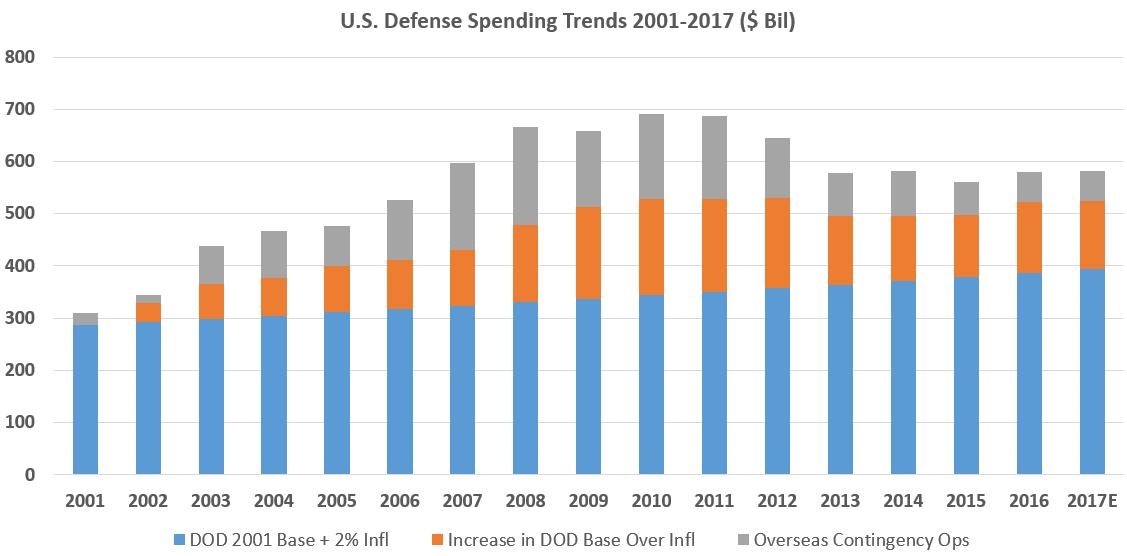
Defense Spending 2001–2017

Defense spending increased from $306 billion in 2001 (2.9% GDP) to $612 billion in 2008 (4.2% GDP). The invasion of Afghanistan following the 9/11 attacks in 2001, along with the 2003 invasion of Iraq, added significantly to defense spending. The Congressional Research Service estimated that Congress approved $1.6 trillion during the FY2001-FY2014 periods for "military operations, base support, weapons maintenance, training of Afghan and Iraq security forces, reconstruction, foreign aid, embassy costs, and veterans’ health care for the war operations initiated since the 9/11 attacks." Roughly half this amount, $803 billion, was approved for the FY2001-2008 period of the Bush administration.

This spending was incremental to the "base" Department of Defense budget, which also increased faster than inflation during the period. The Comptroller of the Department of Defense (DOD) estimated spending for "Overseas Contingency Operations" (OCO), analogous to the CRS amount above, at $748 billion for the 2001-2008 period. This was incremental to the "base" DOD budget, which totaled $3.1 trillion during the 2001-2008 period.

Other estimates define the cost of the Iraq war alone over time as considerably higher. For example, Nobel laureate Joseph Stiglitz has estimated the total cost of the Iraq War at closer to $3 trillion, considering the long-term care for military personnel, equipment replacement, and other factors.

== Budget deficit and national debt ==
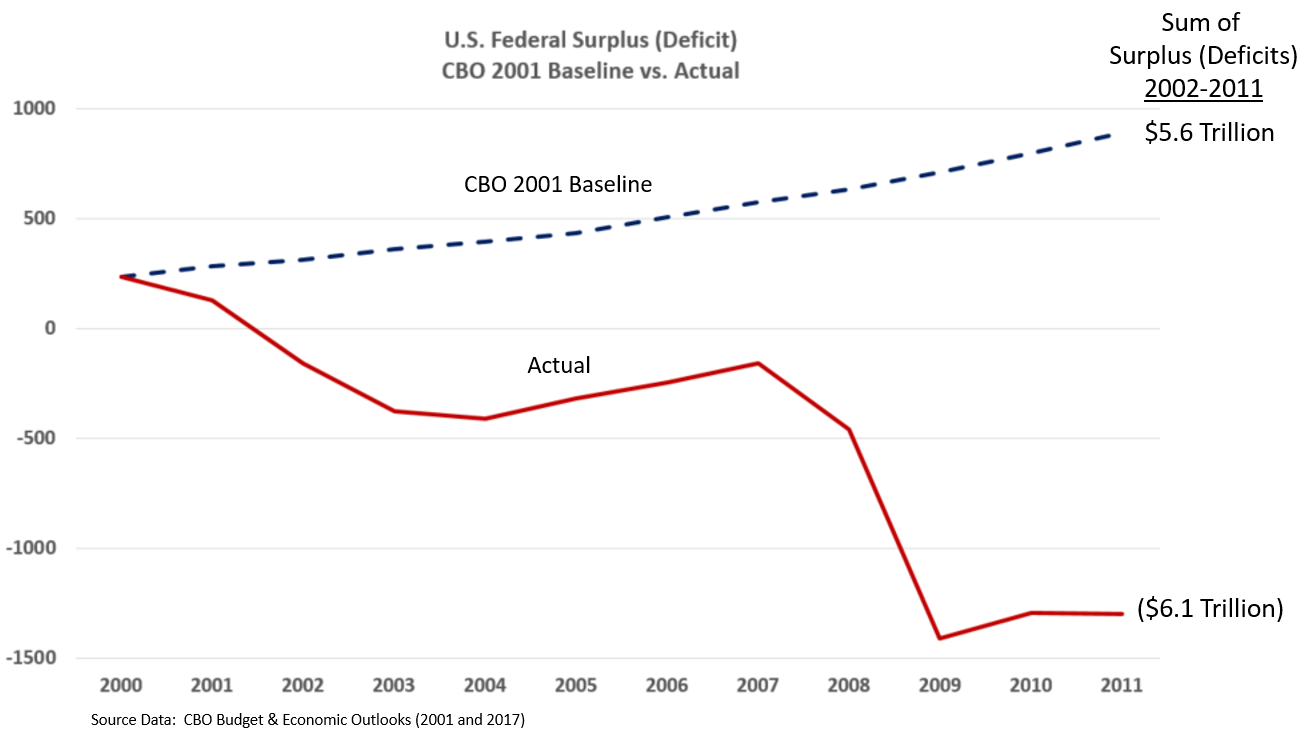
Image compares the CBO January 2001 surplus baseline forecast for the 2002-2011 period versus the actual deficit amounts.

The U.S. fiscal position changed dramatically for the worse during the Bush years. CBO projected in its January 2001 baseline that the U.S. would have a total of $5.6 trillion in annual surpluses over the 2002-2011 decade, assuming the laws in place during the Clinton era continued and the economy performed as expected. However, the actual deficits during those years ended up being $6.1 trillion, a negative swing of $11.7 trillion. Two recessions, two wars, and tax cuts were the primary drivers of the differences.

During his two terms (2001–2008), President Bush averaged 19.0% GDP spending, slightly below the 19.2% GDP spending under Clinton (1993–2000). However, revenues of 17.1% GDP were 1.3% GDP below the 18.4% GDP average during the Clinton era. Further, CBO had forecast in 2001 that revenues would average 20.4% GDP during the 2001-2008 period (above the FY2000 record of 20.0% GDP), while spending would average 16.9% GDP and be on a downward trend, very low by historical standards.

CBO reported that debt held by the public, a partial measure of the national debt, rose from $3.41 trillion in 2000 (33.6% GDP) to $5.80 trillion in 2008 (39.3% GDP). However, CBO had forecast in 2001 that debt held by the public would fall to $1.0 trillion by 2008 (7.1% GDP).

Interest on the debt (including both public and intragovernmental amounts) increased from $322 billion to $454 billion annually. The share of public debt owned by foreigners increased significantly from 31% in June 2001 to 50% in June 2008, with the dollar balance owed to foreigners increasing from $1.0 trillion to $2.6 trillion. This also significantly increased the interest payments sent overseas, from approximately $50 billion in 2001 to $121 billion during 2008.

Most of the debt increase over the 2001-2005 period was accumulated as a result of tax cuts and increased national security spending. According to Richard Kogan and Matt Fiedler, "the largest costs — $1.2 trillion over six years — resulted from the tax cuts enacted since the start of 2001. Increased spending for defense, international affairs, and homeland security – primarily for prosecuting the wars in Iraq and Afghanistan – also was quite costly, amounting to almost $800 billion to date. Together, tax cuts and the spending increases for these security programs account for 84 percent of the increases in debt racked up by Congress and the President over this period." Lawrence Kudlow, however, noted "The U.S. has spent roughly $750 billion for the five-year war. Sure, that’s a lot of money. But the total cost works out to 1 percent of the $63 trillion GDP over that time period. It's miniscule [sic]." He also reported that "during the five years of the Iraq war,. . .household net worth has increased by $20 trillion."

In terms of the budget legacy passed to his successor President Obama, CBO forecast in January 2009 that the deficit that year would be $1.2 trillion, assuming the continuation of Bush policies. From a policy perspective, the long-term deficit legacy depended significantly on whether the Bush tax cuts were allowed to expire in 2010 as initially legislated. President Obama extended the Bush tax cuts entirely through the end of 2012 as part of the 2010 Tax Relief Act, then extended them for the bottom 99% of income earners indefinitely thereafter as part of the fiscal cliff resolution, roughly 80% of the dollar value of the cuts.

President Bush also signed into law Medicare Part D, which provides additional prescription drug benefits to seniors. The program was not funded by any changes to the tax code. According to the GAO, this program alone created $8.4 trillion in unfunded obligations in present value terms, a larger fiscal challenge than Social Security.

Recent additions to U.S. public debt
Fiscal year (begins 10/01 of prev. year)	Value	% of GDP
2001	$144.5 billion	1.4%
2002	$409.5 billion	3.9%
2003	$589.0 billion	5.5%
2004	$605.0 billion	5.3%
2005	$523.0 billion	4.3%
2006	$536.5 billion	4.1%
2007	$459.5 billion	3.4%
2008	$962.0 billion	(proj.) 6.8%

== Trade policy ==
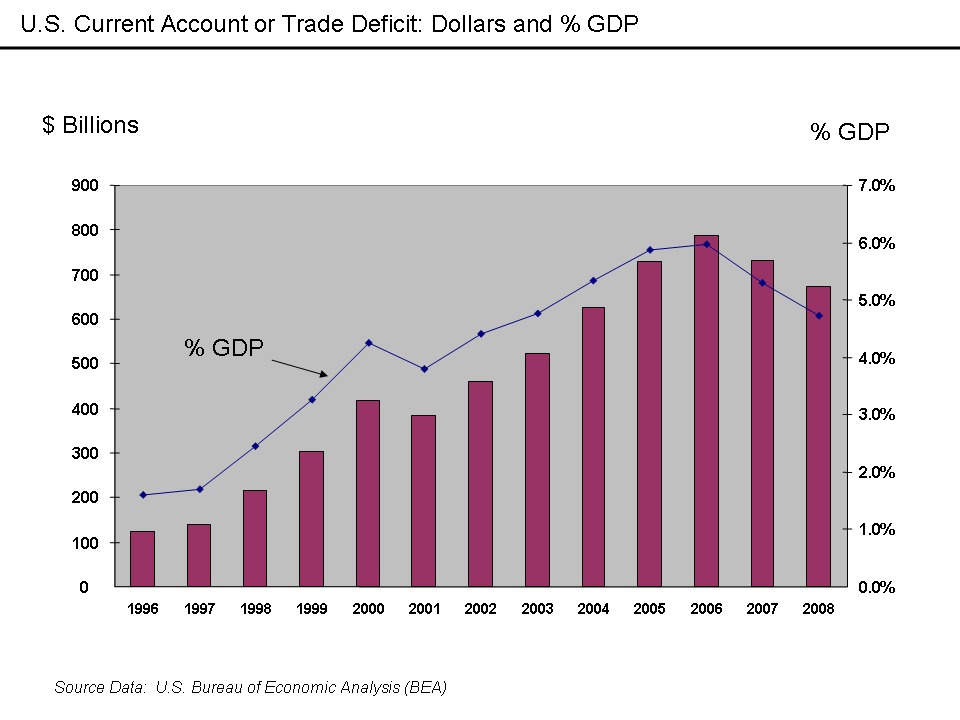
U.S. Current Account or Trade Deficit

The Bush administration generally pursued free trade policies. China entered the World Trade Organization (WTO) in late 2001. Bush used the authority he gained from the Trade Act of 2002 to push through bilateral trade agreements with several countries. Bush also sought to expand multilateral trade agreements through the WTO, but negotiations were stalled in the Doha Development Round for most of Bush's presidency.

The sizable decline in U.S. manufacturing jobs since 2000 has been blamed on various causes, such as trade with a rising Asia, offshoring of jobs with few restrictions to lower wage countries, innovation in global supply chains (e.g., containerization), and other technology improvements. The millions of construction jobs created during the housing bubble that peaked in 2006 helped mask some of this adverse employment impact initially. Further, households dramatically increased their debt burden from 2001 to 2007, extracting home equity for use in consumption. However, the housing bubble collapse in 2006-2008 contributed to the subprime mortgage crisis and resulting Great Recession, which resulted in households switching from adding debt to paying it down, a headwind to the economy for several years thereafter.

Developing countries blamed the US and the EU for stagnated negotiations since both maintain protectionist policies in agriculture. While generally favoring free trade, Bush has also occasionally supported protectionist measures, notably the 2002 United States steel tariff early in his term. Bush also implemented a 300% tax on Roquefort cheese from France in retaliation for a European Union ban on hormone-treated beef common in the American beef industry.

George W. Bush successfully gained ratification of the Dominican Republic–Central America Free Trade Agreement (DR-CAFTA). Supporters of DR-CAFTA claim it has been a success, but detractors still oppose the agreement for a variety of reasons including its impact on the environment.

In 2005, Ben Bernanke addressed the implications of the USA's high and rising current account (trade) deficit, resulting from USA imports exceeding its exports. Between 1996 and 2006, the USA current account deficit increased to a record of nearly 6% of GDP. Financing the trade deficit required the US to borrow large sums from abroad, much of it from countries running trade surpluses, mainly the emerging economies in Asia and oil-exporting nations. A significant portion of this borrowing was directed by large financial institutions into mortgage-backed securities and their derivatives, a factor that contributed to the housing bubble and the crises that followed. The trade deficit peaked in 2006 along with housing prices.

== Efforts to reform Social Security ==
President Bush advocated the partial privatization of Social Security in 2005–2006, but was unsuccessful in achieving any reforms to the program against strong congressional resistance. His proposal would have diverted some of the payroll tax revenues that fund the program into private accounts. Critics argued that privatizing Social Security does nothing to address the long-term funding challenge facing the program. Diverting funds to private accounts would reduce available funds to pay current retirees, requiring significant borrowing. An analysis by the Center on Budget and Policy Priorities estimates that President Bush's 2005 privatization proposal would have added $1 trillion in new federal debt in its first decade of implementation and $3.5 trillion in the decade thereafter.

According to the 2016 Social Security Administration Trustees Report, payments will be cut by 23% under current law around 2035, if no reforms are made to the program.

== Regulatory philosophy ==
Leverage ratios of investment banks increased significantly between 2003 and 2007.

President Bush advocated the Ownership society, premised on the concepts of individual accountability, smaller government, and the owning of property. Critics have argued this contributed to the subprime mortgage crisis, by encouraging home ownership for those unable to afford them and insufficient regulation of financial institutions. The number of economic regulation governmental workers was increased by 91,196, whereas Bill Clinton had cut down the number by 969.

=== Sarbanes-Oxley Act ===
President Bush signed the Sarbanes-Oxley Act into law during July 2002, which he called "the most far-reaching reforms of American business practices since the time of Franklin Delano Roosevelt." The law was passed in the wake of several corporate scandals and widespread stock market losses. The law addressed conflicts of interest between accounting firms and the corporations they audit and required executives to certify the accuracy of the corporation's financial statements. The law has been controversial, with some advocating its positive effect on investor confidence and detractors citing its significant cost.

=== Fannie Mae and Freddie Mac ===
In 2003, the Bush Administration attempted to create an agency to oversee Fannie Mae and Freddie Mac. The bill never made progress in Congress, facing sharp opposition by Democrats. In 2005, the Republican controlled House of Representatives passed a GSE reform bill (Federal Housing Finance Reform Act) which "would have created a stronger regulator with new powers to increase capital at Fannie and Freddie, to limit their portfolios and to deal with the possibility of receivership". However, the Bush administration opposed the bill and it died in the Senate. Of the bill and its reception by the Bush White House, Ohio Republican Mike Oxley (the bill's author) said: "The critics have forgotten that the House passed a GSE reform bill in 2005 that could well have prevented the current crisis. All the handwringing and bedwetting is going on without remembering how the House stepped up on this. What did we get from the White House? We got a one-finger salute." The Bush economic policy regarding Fannie Mae and Freddie Mac changed during the economic downturn of 2008, culminating in the federal takeover of the two largest lenders in the mortgage market. Further economic challenges have resulted in the Bush administration attempting an economic intervention, through a requested $700 billion bailout package for Wall Street investment houses.

=== Regulation of the financial sector ===
Those of us who have looked to the self-interest of lending institutions to protect shareholders' equity, myself included, are in a state of shocked disbelief.

— Alan Greenspan

President Bush and his economic experts did not adequately address fundamental changes in the banking sector which had taken place over the two decades prior to the crisis. The essentially unregulated shadow banking system (e.g., investment banks, mortgage companies, money market mutual funds, etc.) had grown to rival the traditional, regulated depository banking system but without equivalent safeguards. Nobel laureate Paul Krugman described the run on the shadow banking system as the "core of what happened" to cause the crisis. "As the shadow banking system expanded to rival or even surpass conventional banking in importance, politicians and government officials should have realized that they were re-creating the kind of financial vulnerability that made the Great Depression possible—and they should have responded by extending regulations and the financial safety net to cover these new institutions. Influential figures should have proclaimed a simple rule: anything that does what a bank does, anything that has to be rescued in crises the way banks are, should be regulated like a bank." He referred to this lack of controls as "malign neglect."

President Bush stated in September 2008: "Once this crisis is resolved, there will be time to update our financial regulatory structures. Our 21st century global economy remains regulated largely by outdated 20th century laws." The Securities and Exchange Commission (SEC) and Alan Greenspan conceded failure in allowing the self-regulation of investment banks, which proceeded to take on increasingly risky bets and leverage after a key 2004 decision.

== Financial crisis and Great Recession ==
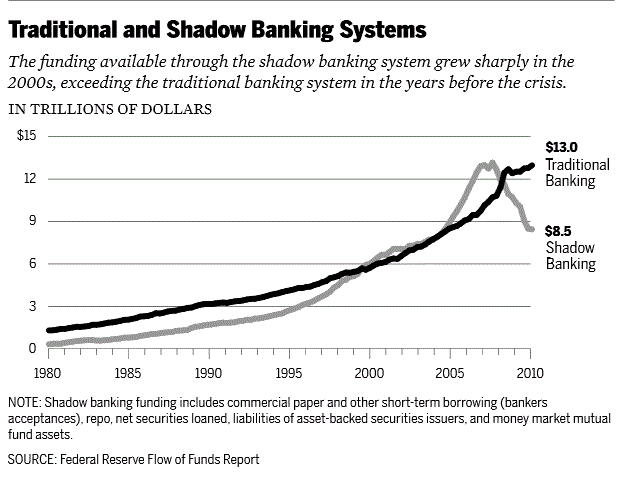
Shadow (non-depository) banking grew to rival traditional (depository) banking, but without similar safeguards.

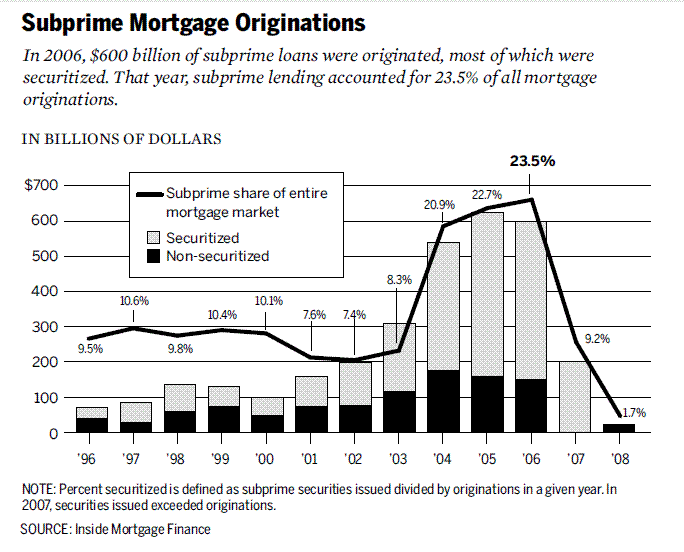
Subprime mortgage lending jumped dramatically during the 2004–2006 period preceding the crisis (source: Financial Crisis Inquiry Commission Report, p. 70 Figure 5.2).

The last year of Bush's second term was dominated by the Great Recession. GDP declined in the 1st, 3rd, and 4th quarters of 2008 by -2.7%, -1.9% and -8.2%, respectively. The recession officially lasted from December 2007 to June 2009, with the economy returning to consistent growth in Q3 2009, although civilian employment did not return to its December 2007 peak until September 2014.

On September 24, 2008, President Bush addressed the nation from the White House on the financial crisis, which he stated "We've seen triple-digit swings in the stock market. Major financial institutions have teetered on the edge of collapse, and some have failed. As uncertainty has grown, many banks have restricted lending, credit markets have frozen, and families and businesses have found it harder to borrow money. We're in the midst of a serious financial crisis, and the federal government is responding with decisive action".

After years of financial deregulation accelerating under the Bush administration, banks lent subprime mortgages to more and more home buyers, causing a housing bubble. Many of these banks also invested in credit default swaps and derivatives that were essentially bets on the soundness of these loans. In response to declining housing prices and fears of an impending recession, the Bush administration arranged passage of the Economic Stimulus Act of 2008. Falling home prices started threatening the financial viability of many institutions, leaving Bear Stearns, a prominent U.S.-based investment bank, on the brink of failure in March 2008. Recognizing the growing threat of a financial crisis, Bush allowed Treasury secretary Paulson to arrange for another bank, JPMorgan Chase, to take over most Bear Stearn's assets. Out of concern that Fannie Mae and Freddie Mac might also fail, the Bush administration put both institutions into conservatorship. Shortly afterwards, the administration learned that Lehman Brothers was on the verge of bankruptcy, but the administration ultimately declined to intervene on behalf of Lehman Brothers.

Paulson hoped that the financial industry had shored itself up after the failure of Bear Stearns and that the failure of Lehman Brothers would not strongly impact the economy, but news of the failure caused stock prices to tumble and froze credit. Fearing a total financial collapse, Paulson and the Federal Reserve took control of American International Group (AIG), another major financial institution that teetered on the brink of failure. Hoping to shore up the other banks, Bush and Paulson proposed the Emergency Economic Stabilization Act of 2008, which would create the $700 billion Troubled Asset Relief Program (TARP) to buy toxic assets. The House rejected TARP in a 228–205 vote; although support and opposition crossed party lines, only about one-third of the Republican caucus supported the bill. After the Dow Jones Industrial Average dropped 778 points on the day of the House vote, the House and Senate both passed TARP. Bush later extended TARP loans to U.S. automobile companies, which faced their own crisis due to the weak economy. Though TARP helped end the financial crisis, it did not prevent the onset of the Great Recession, which would continue long after Bush left office.

Fed chair Ben Bernanke explained in 2010 that vulnerabilities in the global financial system built up over a long period of time, and then specific triggering events set the 2007-2008 subprime mortgage crisis into motion. For example, vulnerabilities included failure to regulate the risk-taking of the non-depository banking sector, the so-called shadow banks such as investment banks and mortgage companies. These companies had outgrown the regulated depository banking sector, but did not have the same safeguards. Further, financial connections were established between the depository banks and shadow banks (e.g., via securitization and special purpose entities) that created dependencies that were not well understood by regulators. Certain types of derivatives, essentially bets on the performance of other securities, remained largely unregulated and were another opaque source of dependencies.

Bernanke further explained that specific triggering events began in mid-2007, as investors began to withdraw funds from the shadow banking system, analogous to depositors withdrawing money from depository banks in past bank runs. Investors became unsure of the value of the securities (loan collateral) held by the shadow banks, as many derived their value from subprime mortgages. Mortgage companies could no longer borrow money to originate mortgages, and many failed in 2007. The crisis accelerated in 2008, as the largest five U.S. investment banks, which had $4 trillion in liabilities by the end of 2007, could no longer obtain financing. They had grown increasingly dependent on short-term sources of financing (e.g., repurchase agreements), and were unable to obtain new funding from investors. These investment banks were forced to sell long-term securities at fire-sale prices to meet their daily financing needs, suffering enormous losses. Concerns about the possible failure of these banks led the financial system to essentially freeze by September 2008. The Federal Reserve increasingly intervened in its role as lender of last resort to stabilize the financial system as the crisis deepened.

Bush responded to the early signs of economic problems with lump-sum tax rebates and other stimulative measures in the Economic Stimulus Act of 2008. In March 2008, Bear Stearns, a major US investment bank heavily invested in subprime mortgage derivatives, began to go under. Rumors of low cash reserves dragged Bear's stock price down while lenders to Bear began to withdraw their cash. The Federal Reserve funneled an emergency loan to Bear through JP Morgan Chase. (As an investment bank, Bear could not borrow from the Fed but JP Morgan Chase, a commercial bank, could).

The Fed ended up brokering an agreement for the sale of Bear to JP Morgan Chase that took place at the end of March. In July, IndyMac went under and had to be placed in conservatorship. In the middle of the summer it seemed like recession might be avoided even though high gas prices threatened consumers and credit problems threatened investment markets, but the economy entered crisis in the fall. Fannie Mae and Freddie Mac were also put under conservatorship in early September.

A few days later, Lehman Brothers began to falter. Treasury Secretary Hank Paulson, who in July had publicly expressed concern that continuous bailouts would lead to moral hazard, decided to let Lehman fail. The fallout from Lehman's failure snowballed into market-wide panic. AIG, an insurance company, had sold credit default swaps insuring against Lehman's failure under the assumption that such a failure was extremely unlikely.

Without enough cash to pay out its Lehman-related debts, AIG went under and was nationalized. Credit markets locked up and catastrophe seemed all too likely. Paulson proposed providing liquidity to financial markets by having the government buy up debt related to bad mortgages with a $700 billion Troubled Asset Relief Program. Congressional Democrats advocated an alternative policy of investing in financial companies directly. Congress passed the Emergency Economic Stabilization Act of 2008, which authorized both policies.

Nearly all of the money paid out for banking bailouts by the Bush administration was in the form of loans that were paid back. For example, as of 2012 the TARP program had paid out $245 billion to banks, while the government got back $267 billion including interest.

== Economic indicators ==
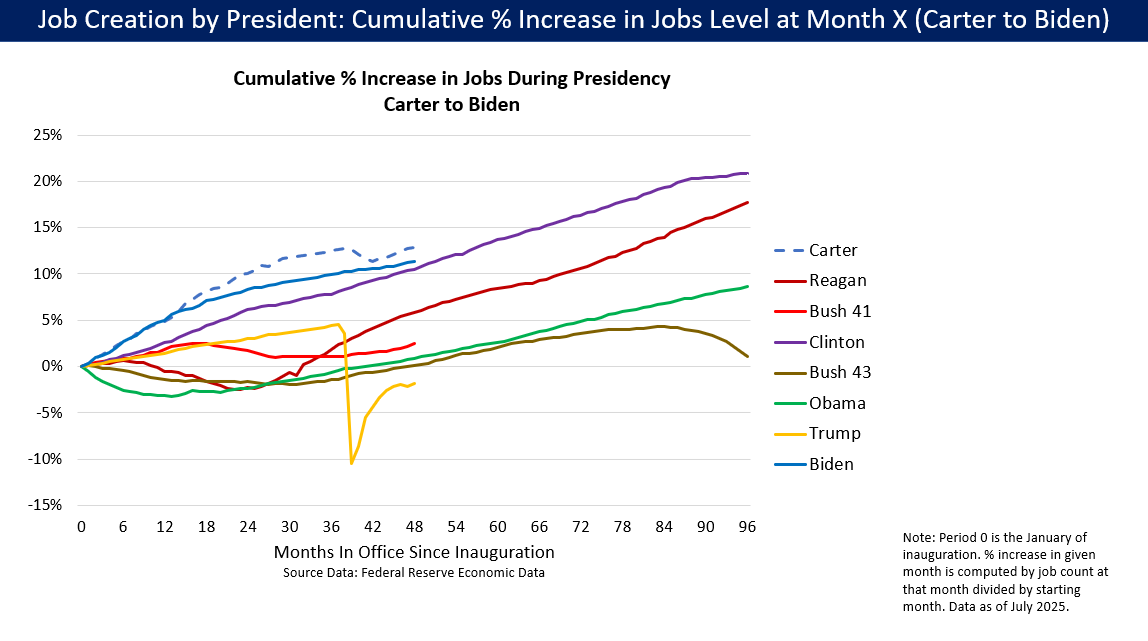
Job growth by U.S. president, measured as cumulative percentage change from month after inauguration to end of term

Economic growth for the 2001 to 2005 business cycle compared to the average for business cycles between 1949 and 2000

=== Overall ===
- Economic growth, measured as the change in real GDP versus the prior quarter, averaged 1.8% from Q1 2001 to Q4 2008. This was slower than the 2.6% average from Q1 1989-Q4 2008. Real GDP grew nearly 3% during President Bush's first term but only 0.5% during his second term. During the Clinton administration, GDP growth was close to 4%. A significant driver of economic growth during the Bush administration was home equity extraction, essentially borrowing against the value of the home to finance personal consumption. Free cash used by consumers from equity extraction doubled from $627 billion in 2001 to $1,428 billion in 2005 as the housing bubble built, nearly $5 trillion over the period. Using the home as a source of funds also reduced the net savings rate significantly.
- Real GDP rose from $12.6 trillion in Q1 2001 to a peak of $15.0 trillion in Q4 2007, before ending at $14.6 trillion, a cumulative increase of $2 trillion or 16%. A March 2006 report by the United States Congress Joint Economic Committee showed that the U.S. economy outperformed its peer group of large developed economies from 2001 to 2005. (The other economies are Canada, the European Union, and Japan.) The U.S. led in real GDP growth, investment, industrial production, employment, labor productivity, and price stability.
- The seasonally adjusted unemployment rate rose from 4.3% in January 2001 to 6.3% in June 2003, then fell as the housing bubble inflated to a trough of 4.4% in March 2007. As the Great Recession deepened, the rate rose again to 6.1% in August 2008 and up to 7.2% in December 2008 at the end of the Bush administration. It peaked at 9.9% in November 2009, early in the Obama administration. From December 2007 when the recession started to December 2008, an additional 3.6 million people became unemployed.
- Private sector job creation (total non-farm payrolls) was a net negative from February 2001 to January 2005. There were 132.7 million persons employed in the private sector in January 2001; this figure fell to a trough of 130.2 million in August 2003 before steadily rising to a peak of 138.4 million in January 2008 as the housing bubble expanded. It then fell rapidly during the Great Recession, to 134.0 million at the end of his two terms in January 2009. It continued falling thereafter to a trough of 129.7 million in February 2010. January 2001 and March 2009 had roughly the same level of non-farm private sector jobs.
- Interest rates remained at moderate levels for most of his two terms, with the 10-year Treasury bond averaging 4.4% yield, compared to 5.8% from Q1 1989-Q4 2008. It finished at 2.4% as the recession deepened.
- Inflation (measured as CPI for all items) averaged 2.8% during his tenure, similar to the 3.0% average from Q1 1989-Q4 2008, but plunged to zero in late 2008 as the economy entered a deep recession.

=== Households ===
- Household debt grew dramatically during the period to a record level, rising from $7.4 trillion in Q1 2001 to $14.3 trillion in Q4 2008, an increase of $6.9 trillion. Measured as a percent of GDP, it rose from 70% GDP to 99% GDP. This debt addition was a driver of the housing bubble and crises that followed. When housing prices fell, but the value of the mortgage debt generally did not, many homeowners found themselves in a negative equity position (underwater) on their homes, driving a significant housing payment delinquency and foreclosure problem. This caused investors to question the value of mortgage-backed securities held by financial institutions, contributing to the run on the shadow banking system.
- Median household income has more than kept up with inflation since Bush took control of fiscal policy during the 2001 near-recession, growing 1.6% higher in constant 2007 dollars to $50,233 in 2007 from $49,454 in 2001.
- The poverty rate increased from 11.25% in 2000 to 12.3% in 2006 after peaking at 12.7% in 2004; in 2008 increased to 13.2%. The Under 18 years poverty rate increased from 16.2% in 2000 to 18% in 2007; in 2008 rose to 19%. From 2000 to 2005, only 4% of workers, typically highly educated professionals, had real income increases.
- During President Bush's terms, income inequality grew. CBO reported that the share of after-tax income received by the top 1% rose from 12.3% in 2001 to a peak of 16.7% in 2007, before ending at 14.1% in 2008. Comparing 2001 and 2008, the lowest and highest quintiles of the income distribution had a larger share of the after-tax income, while the middle three quintiles had a lower share.

== See also ==
- Starve the beast - Post 1970s taxation/budget policy
- U.S. economic performance under Democratic and Republican presidents
