= Podgornik =

Podgornik is a surname of Slavic origin, commonly used in Slovenia. Notable people with the surname include:

- Dean Podgornik (born 1979), Slovenian cyclist
- Rudolf Podgornik (1955–2024), Slovenian theoretical physicist
