= Bush tax cuts =

Changes to the United States tax code during the Bush presidency

The Bush tax cuts were the changes to the United States tax code passed originally during the presidency of George W. Bush and extended during the presidency of Barack Obama, through:

- Economic Growth and Tax Relief Reconciliation Act of 2001 (EGTRRA)
- Jobs and Growth Tax Relief Reconciliation Act of 2003 (JGTRRA)
- Tax Relief, Unemployment Insurance Reauthorization, and Job Creation Act of 2010
- American Taxpayer Relief Act of 2012 (partial extension)

While each act has its own legislative history and effect on the tax code, the JGTRRA amplified and accelerated aspects of the EGTRRA. Since 2003, the two acts have often been spoken of together, especially in terms of analyzing their effect on the U.S. economy and population and in discussing their political ramifications. Both laws were passed using controversial congressional reconciliation procedures.

The Bush tax cuts had sunset provisions that made them expire at the end of 2010, since otherwise they would fall under the Byrd Rule. Whether to thwart the sunset provisions, and how, became the subject of extended political debate, which was resolved during the presidency of Barack Obama by a two-year delay of the expiration, which was part of a larger tax and economic package, the Tax Relief, Unemployment Insurance Reauthorization, and Job Creation Act of 2010. In 2012, during the fiscal cliff, Obama overcame the sunset provisions and made the tax cuts permanent for single people earning less than $400,000 per year and couples making less than $450,000 per year, but did not stop the sunset provisions from applying to higher incomes, under the American Taxpayer Relief Act of 2012.

Before the tax cuts, the highest marginal income tax rate was 39.6 percent. After the cuts, the highest rate was 35 percent. Once the cuts sunset for high income levels (single people making $400,000+ per year and couples making $450,000+ per year), the top income tax rate returned to 39.6 percent.

== Implications for the Alternative Minimum Tax ==
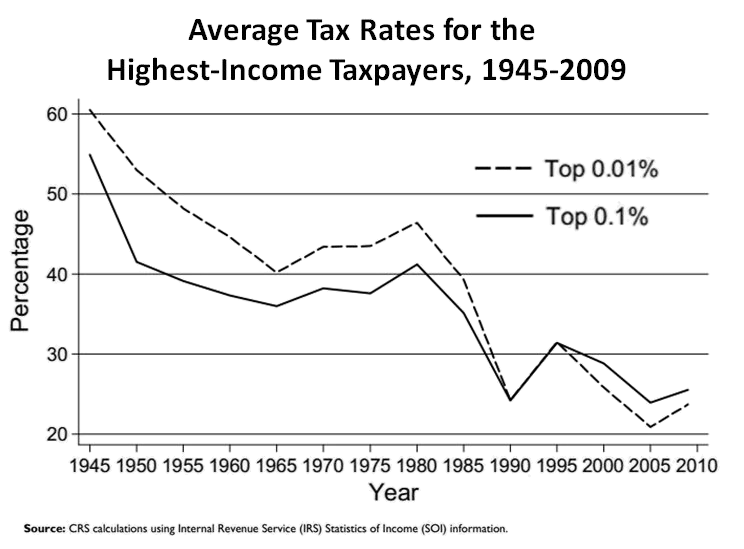
Average tax rate percentages for the highest-income U.S. taxpayers, 1945–2009

The 2001 act and the 2003 act significantly lowered the marginal tax rates for nearly all U.S. taxpayers. One byproduct of this tax rate reduction was that it brought to prominence a previously lesser known provision of the U.S. Internal Revenue Code, the Alternative Minimum Tax (AMT). The AMT was originally designed as a way of making sure that wealthy taxpayers could not take advantage of "too many" tax incentives and reduce their tax obligation by too much. It is a parallel system of calculating a taxpayer's tax liability that eliminates many deductions. However the applicable AMT rates were not adjusted to match the lowered rates of the 2001 and 2003 acts, causing many more people to face higher taxes. This reduced the benefit of the two acts for many upper-middle income earners, particularly those with deductions for state and local income taxes, dependents, and property taxes.

The AMT exemption level aspects of the 2001 and 2003 tax cuts, as well as the sunsetting year of capital gains and dividends, were among the tweaks made to the tax code in the Tax Increase Prevention and Reconciliation Act of 2005.

== CBO scoring ==
The non-partisan Congressional Budget Office has consistently reported that the Bush tax cuts did not pay for themselves and represented a sizable decline in revenue for the Treasury:

- The CBO estimated in June 2012 that the Bush tax cuts of 2001 (EGTRRA) and 2003 (JGTRRA) added approximately $1.5 trillion total to the debt over the 2002–2011 decade, excluding interest.
- The CBO estimated in January 2009 that the Bush tax cuts would add approximately $3.0 trillion to the debt over the 2010–2019 decade if fully extended at all income levels, including interest.
- The CBO estimated in January 2009 that extending the Bush tax cuts at all income levels over the 2011–2019 period would increase the annual deficit by an average of 1.7% GDP, reaching 2.0% GDP in 2018 and 2019.

== Debate over effect of cuts ==
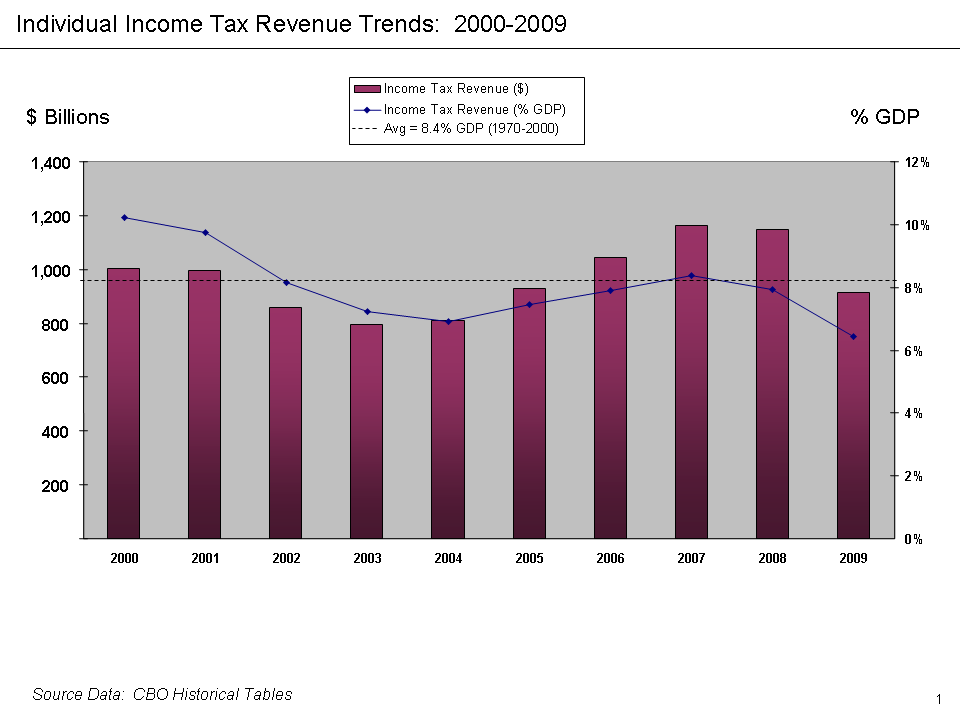
CBO data – Federal individual income tax revenue trends from 2000 to 2009 (dollars and % GDP)

There was and is considerable controversy over who benefited from the tax cuts and whether or not they have been effective in spurring sufficient growth. Supporters of the proposal and proponents of lower taxes say that the tax cuts increased the pace of economic recovery and job creation. Further, proponents of the cuts asserted that lowering taxes on all citizens, including the rich, would benefit all and would actually increase receipts from the wealthiest Americans as their tax rates would decline without resort to tax shelters. Opponents argued the tax cuts on the wealthy were simply of the trickle down variety. The Wall Street Journal editorial page states that taxes paid by millionaire households more than doubled from $136 billion in 2003 to $274 billion in 2006 because of the JGTRRA.

A report published by staff at conservative public policy think tank The Heritage Foundation claimed that the 2001 cuts alone would result in the complete elimination of the U.S. national debt by fiscal year 2010.

The Heritage Foundation concluded in 2007 that the Bush tax cuts led to the rich shouldering more of the income tax burden and the poor shouldering less; while the Center on Budget and Policy Priorities (CBPP) has concluded that the tax cuts have conferred the "largest benefits, by far on the highest income households." CBPP cites data from the Tax Policy Center, stating that 24.2% of tax savings went to households in the top one percent of income compared to the share of 8.9% that went to the middle 20 percent. The underlying policy has been criticized by Democratic Party congressional opponents for giving tax cuts to the rich with capital gains tax breaks.

Statements by President Bush, Vice President Dick Cheney, and Senate Majority Leader Bill Frist that these tax cuts effectively "paid for themselves" have been disputed by the CBPP, the U.S. Treasury Department and the CBO. Economist Paul Krugman wrote in 2007: "Supply side doctrine, which claimed without evidence that tax cuts would pay for themselves, never got any traction in the world of professional economic research, even among conservatives." Since 2001, federal income tax revenues have remained below the 30-year average of 8.4% of GDP with the exception of 2007, and did not regain their year 2000 dollar peak until 2006, though reasons for regaining previous levels are not given (see chart at right).

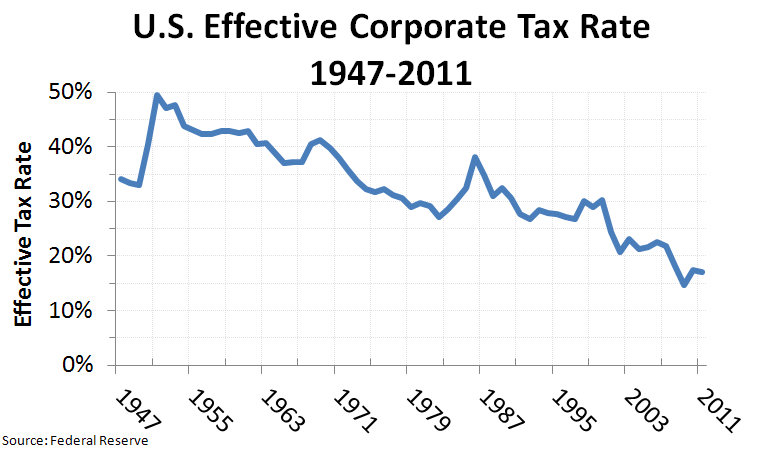
The U.S. federal effective corporate tax rate, 1947–2011

Some policy analysts and non-profit groups such as OMBWatch, Center on Budget and Policy Priorities, and the Tax Policy Center have attributed much of the rise in income inequality to the Bush administration's tax policy. In February 2007, President Bush addressed the rise of inequality for the first time, saying "The reason is clear: We have an economy that increasingly rewards education and skills because of that education."

Critics state that the tax cuts, including those given to middle and lower income households, failed to spur growth. Critics have further stated that the cuts also increased the budget deficit, shifted the tax burden from the rich to the middle and working classes, and further increased already high levels of income inequality. Economists Peter Orszag and William Gale described the Bush tax cuts as reverse government redistribution of wealth, "[shifting] the burden of taxation away from upper-income, capital-owning households and toward the wage-earning households of the lower and middle classes." Supporters argued that the tax brackets were still more progressive than the brackets from 1986 until 1992, with higher marginal rates on the upper class, and lower marginal rates on the middle class than established by either the Tax Reform Act of 1986 or the Omnibus Budget Reconciliation Act of 1990.

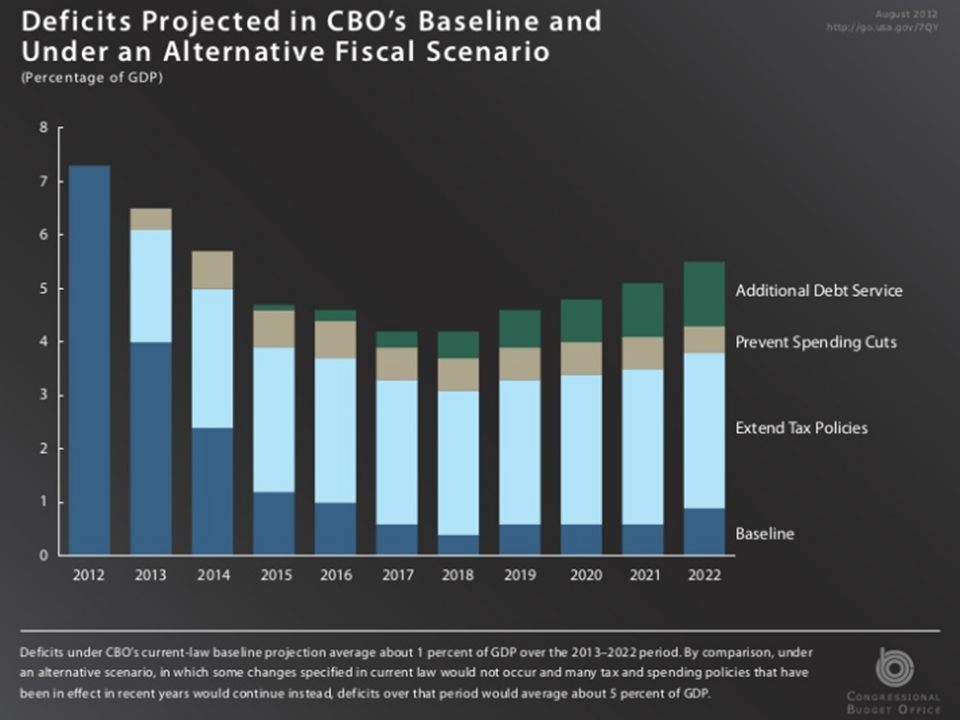
U.S. Federal budget deficit as % GDP assuming continuation of certain policies 2011–2021

Economist Simon Johnson wrote in 2010: "The U.S. government doesn’t take in much tax revenue—at least 10 percentage points of GDP less than comparable developed economies—and it also doesn’t spend much except on the military, Social Security and Medicare. Other parts of government spending can be frozen or even slashed, but it just won’t make that much difference. That means older Americans are going to get squeezed, while our ability to defend ourselves goes into decline. Just because there’s a bipartisan consensus on an idea, such as tax cuts, doesn’t mean it makes sense. Today’s tax cutters have set us up for tomorrow’s fiscal crisis and real damage to U.S. national security."

A The Washington Post article takes a different view, saying that data showed the biggest contributor to the disappearance of projected surpluses was increased spending, which accounted for 36.5 percent of the decline in the nation's fiscal position, followed by incorrect CBO estimates, which accounted for 28 percent. The Bush tax cuts (along with some Obama tax cuts) were responsible for just 24 percent.

The New York Times stated in an editorial that the full Bush-era tax cuts were the single biggest contributor to the deficit over the past decade, reducing revenues by about $1.8 trillion between 2002 and 2009. However, a 2006 article asserted that there was a "surprising jump" in tax revenue that was "curbing" the deficit.

CBO estimated in June 2012 that the Bush tax cuts (EGTRRA and JGTRRA) added about $1.6 trillion to the debt between 2001 and 2011, excluding interest. A 2006 Treasury Department study estimated that the Bush tax cuts reduced revenue by approximately 1.5% GDP on average for each of the first four years of their implementation, an approximately 6% annual reduction in revenue relative to a baseline without those tax cuts. The study did not extend the analysis beyond the first four years of implementation.

== Debate over continuation of cuts ==
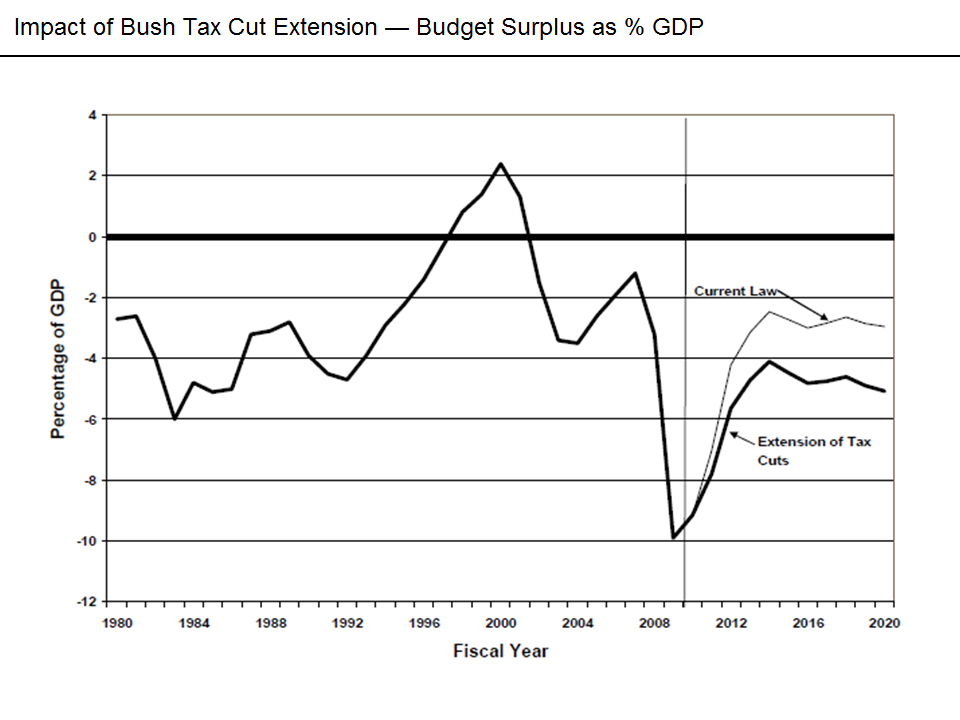
Congressional Research Service (CRS) analysis on extending the tax cuts from September 2010

Most of the tax cuts were scheduled to expire December 31, 2010. Debate over what to do regarding the expiration became a regular issue in the 2004 and 2008 U.S. presidential elections, with Republican candidates generally wanting the expiration to be thwarted and Democratic candidates generally advocating for thwarting the expiration for middle-class incomes but allowing the JGTRRA expiration to remain for high incomes. During his presidential election campaign, then candidate Obama stated that couples with incomes less than $250,000 would not be subjected to the scheduled JGTRRA tax increases. This income level later became a focal point for debate over what defined the middle class.

In August 2010, the Congressional Budget Office (CBO) estimated that extending the tax cuts for the 2011–2020 time period would add $3.3 trillion to the national debt, comprising $2.65 trillion in foregone tax revenue plus another $0.66 trillion for interest and debt service costs.

The non-partisan Pew Charitable Trusts estimated in May 2010 that extending some or all of the tax cuts would have the following impact under these scenarios:

- Making the tax cuts permanent for all taxpayers, regardless of income, would increase the national debt $3.3 trillion over the next 10 years.
- Limiting the extension to individuals making less than $200,000 and married couples earning less than $250,000 would increase the debt about $2.2 trillion in the next decade.
- Extending the tax cuts for all taxpayers for only two years would cost $561 billion over the next 10 years.

The non-partisan Congressional Research Service has estimated the 10-year revenue loss from extending the 2001 and 2003 tax cuts beyond 2010 at $2.9 trillion, with an additional $606 billion in debt service costs (interest), for a combined total of $3.5 trillion.

In late July 2010, analysts at Deutsche Bank said letting the Bush tax cuts expire for those earning more than $250,000 would greatly slow economic recovery. However, Treasury Secretary Timothy Geithner said allowing the expiration would not cause such a slowing. The Obama administration proposed keeping tax cuts for couples making less than $250,000 per year. Economist Mark Zandi predicted that making the Bush tax cuts permanent would be the second least stimulative of several policies considered. Making the tax cuts permanent would have a multiplier effect of 0.29 (compared to the highest multiplier of 1.73 for food stamps).

== Extension of Bush tax cuts ==
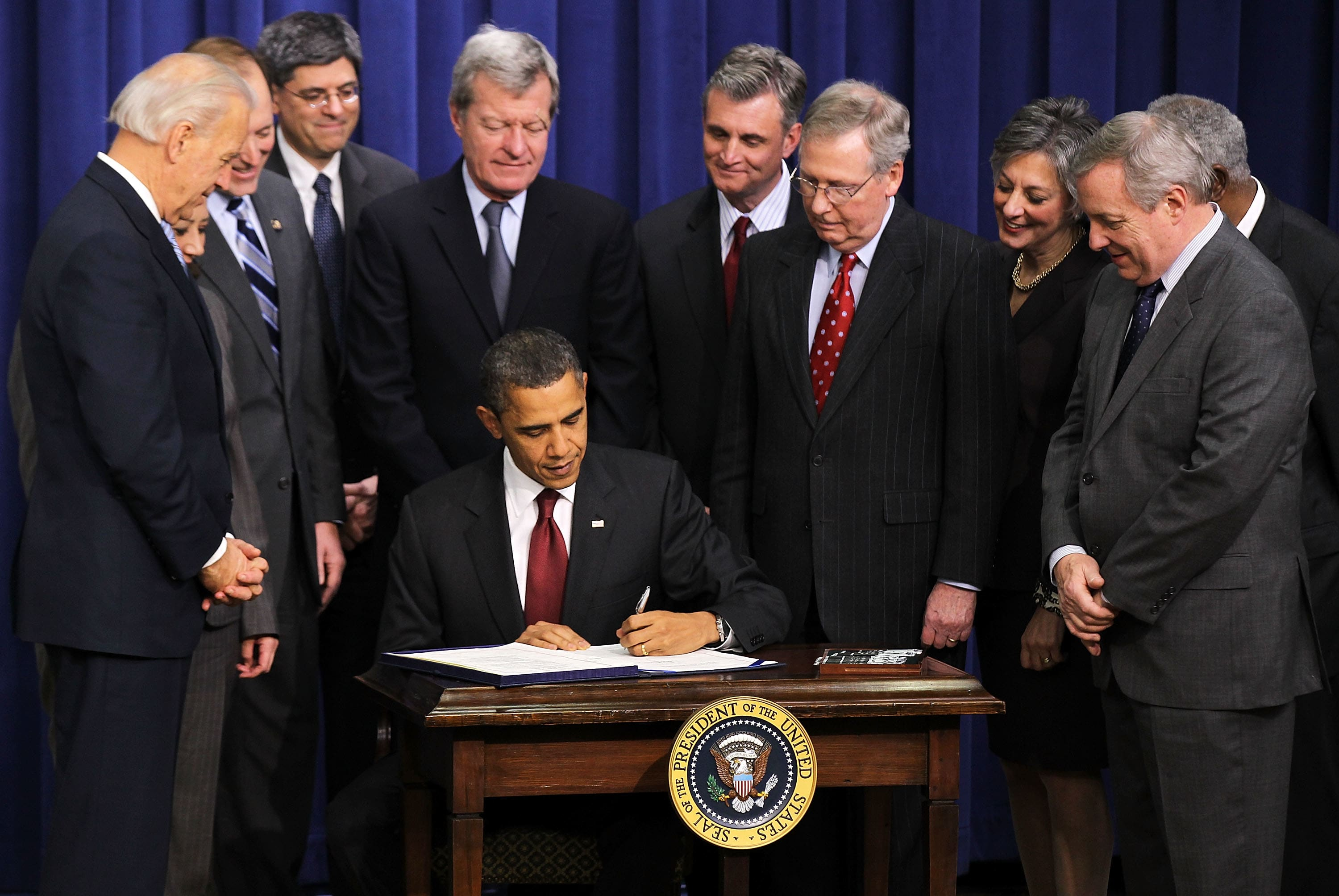
President Obama signs the extension of the tax cuts into law.

The issue came to a head in late 2010, during a lame-duck session of the 111th Congress. The Slurpee Summit was a White House meeting between U.S. President Barack Obama and U.S. Congressional leaders that occurred on November 30, 2010. The name "Slurpee Summit" is a reference to an analogy Obama used while campaigning for the 2010 midterm elections. It was the first such meeting in the wake of the November midterm election in which Republicans took control of the House and gained six seats in the Democratic-controlled Senate. Obama apologized during the meeting for not making a greater effort to reach out to Republican lawmakers during his first two years in office, and appointed Treasury Secretary Tim Geithner and Office of Management and Budget chief Jack Lew to help Republicans and Democrats hammer out an agreement on thwarting the JGTRRA-scheduled tax increases. In return, all 42 Republican senators pledged to block all legislation until the tax matter was settled.

Congressional Democrats offered two attempts to extend the sunsetting Bush-era rates for "middle income" families but allow their expiration for "high income" people. The first proposal had a cutoff at $250,000, while the second raised the dividing line to $1 million. Both proposals were able to pass in the House, but on December 4, 2010, both fell short of the 60 votes required to avoid a filibuster.

On December 6, 2010, President Barack Obama announced a compromise tax package proposal had been reached, centered around a temporary, two-year delay of the JGTRRA-scheduled tax increases. In particular, the framework included key points such as:

- Delaying the tax increases for two years. Also, reforming the AMT to ensure an additional 21 million households will not face a tax increase. These measures are intended to provide relief to more than 100 million middle-class families and prevent an annual tax increase of over $2,000 for the typical family.
- Additional provisions designed to promote economic growth. $56 billion in unemployment insurance, an approximate $120 billion payroll tax cut for working families, about $40 billion in tax cuts for the hardest hit families and students, and 100 percent expensing for businesses during 2011.
- Estate tax adjustment. Rates would be 35 percent after a $5 million exemption.

Obama said, "I'm not willing to let working families across this country become collateral damage for political warfare here in Washington. And I'm not willing to let our economy slip backwards just as we're pulling ourselves out of this devastating recession. ... So, sympathetic as I am to those who prefer a fight over compromise, as much as the political wisdom may dictate fighting over solving problems, it would be the wrong thing to do. ... As for now, I believe this bipartisan plan is the right thing to do. It’s the right thing to do for jobs. It’s the right thing to do for the middle class. It is the right thing to do for business. And it’s the right thing to do for our economy. It offers us an opportunity that we need to seize." According to Kori Schulman (2010), Director of Online Engagement for the Whitehouse media team, the agreement has three accomplishments: “working families will not lose their tax cut, focused on high impact job creation measures, and does not worsen the medium-and-long-term deficit.”

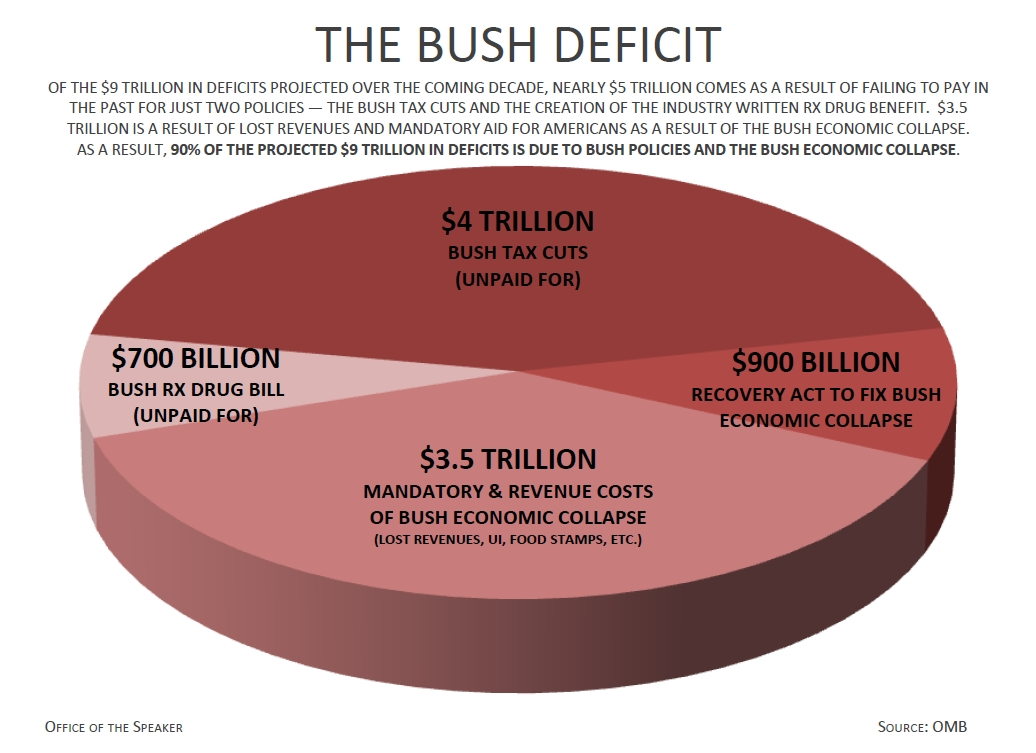
The Bush Deficit, by Nancy Pelosi

Administration officials like Vice President Joe Biden then worked to convince wary Democratic members of Congress to accept the plan, notwithstanding a continuation of lower rates for the highest-income taxpayers. The compromise proved popular in public opinion polls, and allowed Obama to portray himself as a consensus-builder not beholden to the liberal wing of his party. The bill was opposed by some of the most conservative members of the Republican Party as well as by talk radio hosts such as Rush Limbaugh and some groups in the Tea Party movement. It was also opposed by several leading potential candidates for the Republican nomination in the 2012 presidential election, including Mitt Romney, typically on the grounds that it did not cancel the JGTRRA tax increases permanently and that it would overall increase the national deficit.

In an interview during these debates, former President Bush said, "I wish they would have called it something other than the 'Bush tax cuts'. There'd probably be less angst amongst some to pass it." He argued strongly for thwarting the tax increases: "I do believe it's very important to send the signal to our entrepreneurs and our families that the government trusts them to spend their own money. And I happen to believe lower taxes is what stimulates economic growth and what we need now in our country is economic growth."

On December 15, 2010, the Senate passed the compromise package with an 81–19 vote, with large majorities of both Democrats and Republicans supporting it. Near midnight on December 16, the House passed the measure on a vote of 277–148, with only a modest majority of Democrats but a large majority of Republicans voting for the package. Before that, an amendment put forward by Democratic Representative Earl Pomeroy and the progressives among the Democratic caucus to raise the estate tax, which was the ultimate sticking point of the deal for them and the cause of a minor revolt among those against it, failed on a 194–233 vote. The Washington Post called the approved deal "the most significant tax bill in nearly a decade." President Barack Obama signed the Tax Relief, Unemployment Insurance Reauthorization, and Job Creation Act of 2010, on December 17, 2010.

=== Fiscal cliff ===
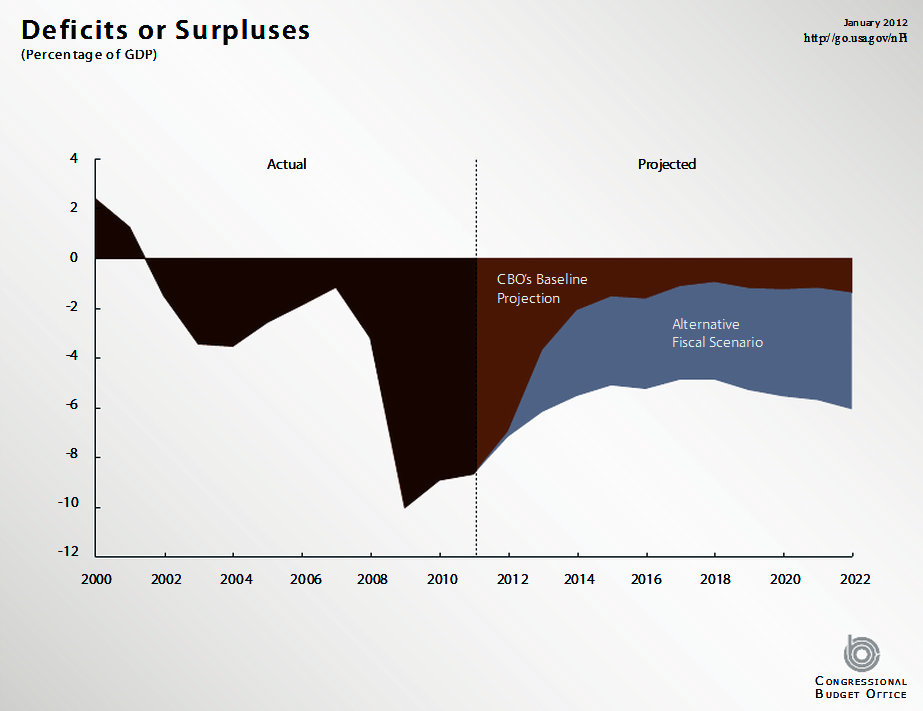
Budget deficits, projected through 2022. The CBO Baseline shows the effects of the fiscal cliff if Congress did nothing. The Alternative Scenario represents what would happen if Congress extends the tax and spending laws that are due to expire at the end of 2012.

The "fiscal cliff" refers to December 31, 2012, the date of the expected implementation of government spending reductions and expiration of a large number of tax cuts; many of these tax increases were scheduled by JGTRRA though delayed by President Obama. In a report released in May 2012, the Congressional Budget Office (CBO) In addition to the government spending reductions and tax cuts, increases in costs from the Patient Protection and Affordable Care Act were slated to take effect, as well. The CBO predicted that these policy changes could lead to reduced economic growth, significant enough to be considered a recession, although the 2013 deficit would be cut roughly in half and the debt trajectory over the next decade would be significantly improved.

The increase in tax rates that was due to occur had been described by Republicans including House Speaker John Boehner, House Majority Leader Eric Cantor and Senate Republican Leader Mitch McConnell as the largest in U.S. history, although the U.S. would be returning to Clinton-era tax rates. According to the Associated Press, the increase would be the second largest after the tax increase of 1942, if population growth, increased pay and the size of the economy are taken into account.

Based on figures from the CBO and Joint Committee on Taxation, federal taxes would have increased by a total of $423 billion in 2013, if the tax cuts had been allowed to expire. The non-partisan Tax Policy Center estimated that for 83% of households in the U.S., there would be an average tax increase of $3,701 and The Heritage Foundation stated that those impacted by the tax cut expiry are primarily in the middle- and low-income groups, with its research finding that families would experience an average tax increase of $4,138.

According to the Center on Budget and Policy Priorities, the expiration of the Bush income tax rates (i.e., returning to Clinton-era rates) would have affected higher income families more than lower income families. The Bush tax cuts reduced income taxes for those earning over $1 million by $110,000 per year on average during the 2004–2012 period. The tax cuts made the tax system less progressive. From 2004 through 2012, the tax cuts increased the after-tax income of the highest-income taxpayers by a far larger percentage than they did for middle- and low-income taxpayers. During 2010 for example, the tax cuts increased the after-tax income of people making over $1 million by more than 7.3%, but increased the after-tax income of the middle 20% of households by just 2.8%

A report from the CBO concluded that extending the tax cuts and spending policies would lead to federal debt increasing from 73% in 2012 to over 90% of U.S. gross domestic product by 2022, but that the debt-to-GDP ratio would decline to 61% in 2022 if the tax cuts expired and scheduled spending cuts took place. The CBO concluded that

The explosive path of federal debt under the alternative fiscal scenario underscores the need for large and timely policy changes to put the federal government on a sustainable fiscal course. Policymakers will need to increase revenues substantially above historical levels as a percentage of GDP, decrease spending significantly from projected levels, or adopt some combination of those two approaches. In fact, the current laws that underlie CBO's baseline projections provide for significant changes of those kinds in coming years; many other approaches to constraining future deficits are possible as well.

CBO's term "alternative scenario" refers to extending the tax cuts and preventing scheduled automatic spending cuts, while "baseline scenario" refers to allowing the tax cuts to expire and the spending cuts to take place, as provided for by laws in effect in June 2012.

The expiration of the tax rate cuts was opposed by Republicans including those on the House Ways and Means Committee, which attempted to produce a bill providing for a one-year extension that would ensure that federal tax rates for all income levels, capital gains, dividends and estate taxes would remain the same. The bill would have also retained tax credits including the child tax credit but would propose ending the current payroll-tax cut. The Democratic-majority Senate was in favor of extending the tax cuts only on that portion of household income below $250,000 per year.

== American Taxpayer Relief Act of 2012 ==
On January 1, 2013, the Bush Tax Cuts expired. However, on January 2, 2013, President Obama signed the American Taxpayer Relief Act of 2012, which reinstated many of the tax cuts, effective retroactively to January 1. The 2012 Act did not repeal the increase in the highest marginal income tax rate (from 35% to 39.6%) which had been imposed on January 1 as a result of the expiration of the Bush Tax Cuts.

== See also ==
- Economic policy of Barack Obama
- Economic policy of the George W. Bush administration
- Economists' statement opposing the Bush tax cuts
- Taxation in the United States
