= Rudolf Podgornik =

Slovenian physicist (1955–2024)

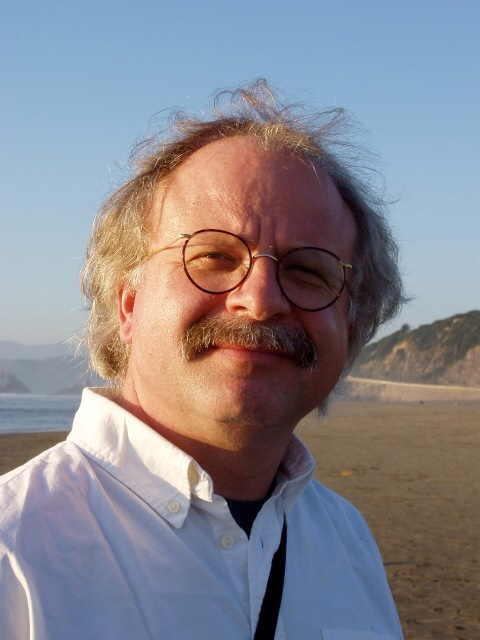
- Born: 27 August 1955; Ljubljana, PR Slovenia, FPR Yugoslavia
- Died: 28 December 2024 (aged 69)
- Education: University of Ljubljana (B.S., M.A., and Ph.D.)
- Scientific career
- Thesis: The contribution of water structure to the interactions between biological macromolecules
- Doctoral advisor: Boštjan Žekš

Rudolf Podgornik (27 August 1955 – 28 December 2024) was a Slovenian theoretical physicist.

Podgornik was an emeritus professor at the University of Ljubljana, and at the time of his death held a chair professorship at University of Chinese Academy of Sciences. He is best known for his work on soft matter physics, physics of Coulombic fluids, physics of macromolecular interactions, Lifshitz theory of Casimir–van der Waals dispersion interaction, the Casimir effect, and biophysics, including the physics of membranes, polymers, polyelectrolytes, DNA, RNA,and viruses.

== Life and career ==
Podgornik was born on 27 August 1955. He and his coworkers discovered the line hexatic phase in the phase diagram of the concentrated long fragment DNA solutions. The line hexatic mesophase appears to be the preferred packing form of long DNA in bacteriophages. He is the author of more than two hundred scientific papers and a coeditor of books: "Electrostatic Effects in Soft Matter" (Proceedings of the NATO Advanced Study Institute, Les Houches, France, 1–13 October 2000, Series: NATO Science Series II: Mathematics, Physics and Chemistry, Vol. 46 ), together with Christian Holm and Patrick Kekicheff and "Electrostatics of Soft and Disordered Matter" (Pan Stanford Publishing, March 31, 2014) with David S. Dean, Jure Dobnikar and Ali Naji. Together with D. Harries, J. DeRouchey, H. H. Strey, and V. A. Parsegian, he coauthored the chapter "Interactions in Macromolecular Complexes Used as Nonviral Vectors for Gene Delivery", in the leading textbook of gene therapy: "Gene Therapy: Therapeutic Mechanisms and Strategies", N. Smyth – Templeton, Marcel Dekker, New York (2008), Third Edition.

Rudolf Podgornik was Professor emeritus at the Physics Department, Faculty of Mathematics and Physics, University of Ljubljana. In the past he was professor of physics at the Physics Department, Faculty of Mathematics and Physics, University of Ljubljana and professor of biophysics at the School of medicine, University of Ljubljana. He was also Chair professor at the School of Physical Sciences, University of Chinese Academy of Sciences (UCAS), Beijing and adjunct professor at the Kavli Institute for Theoretical Sciences (KITS) at the University of Chinese Academy of Sciences, Beijing and at the Wenzhou Institute of the UCAS (WIUCAS). He was the former head of the research program Biophysics of polymers, membranes, gels, colloids and cells, financially supported by the Slovenian Research and Innovation Agency (ARIS) and a Scientist emeritus at the Theoretical Physics Department of the Jozef Stefan Institute in Ljubljana. Until 2010 he was an Adjunct researcher at the National Institutes of Health, Bethesda, MD. From 2011 to 2016 he was also adjunct professor at the Physics Department, University of Massachusetts, Amherst and from 2013 to 2017 an adjunct professor at the Materials Science & Engineering Department at the Case Western Reserve University, Cleveland. He was a former coeditor-in-chief of the Journal of Biological Physics, published by Springer, a former member of the Editorial board of the journal Physical Review E published by the American Physical Society and of the journal Scientific Reports published by Nature-Springer and a former Advisory Editor of the European Biophysics Journal (EBJ) published by Springer Nature on behalf of the European Biophysical Societies Association (EBSA). He spent several terms as a panel member of the 'Starting grants panel of the 'European Research Council' established by the 'European commission'.

Podgornik died on 28 December 2024, at the age of 69.

== Selected publications ==
- R. Podgornik, H.H. Strey, K. Gawrisch, D.C. Rau, A. Rupprecht and V.A. Parsegian: Bond orientational order, molecular motion and free energy of high density DNA mesophases, Proc. Natl. Acad. Sci. 93, 4261-4266 (1996).
- V. Lorman, R. Podgornik and B. Zeks, Positional, Reorientational, and Bond Orientational Order in DNA Mesophases, Phys. Rev. Lett. 87 (2001) 218101-4.
- M. Mkrtchian, V.A. Parsegian, R.Podgornik, W.M. Saslow, Universal Therma Radiation Drag on Neutral Objects, Physical Review Letters 28 November 2003 Phys. Rev. Lett. 91, 220801 (2003).
- R. Podgornik, D. Harries, J. DeRouchey, H. H. Strey, and V. A. Parsegian, Interactions in Macromolecular Complexes Used as Nonviral Vectors for Gene Delivery, in Gene Therapy: Therapeutic Mechanisms and Strategies, N. Smyth – Templeton, Marcel Dekker, New York (2008), Third Edition.
- R.H. French, V. A. Parsegian, R. Podgornik et al. Long Range Interactions in Nanoscale Science, Reviews of Modern Physics, 82, 1887 (2010).
- A. Siber, A. Losdorfer Bozic and R. Podgornik, Energies and pressures in viruses: contribution of nonspecific electrostatic interactions, Phys. Chem. Chem. Phys., 2012, 14, 3746–3765.
- A. Naji, M. Kanduč, J. Forsman, R. Podgornik, Perspective: Coulomb fluids—weak coupling, strong coupling, in between and beyond, J. Chem. Phys. 139, 150901 (2013).
- M. Ghodrat, A. Naji, H. Komaie-Moghaddam, and R. Podgornik, Strong coupling electrostatics for randomly charged surfaces: Antifragility and effective interactions, Soft Matter 11, 3441-3459 (2015).
- R.Garćes, R. Podgornik, V. Lorman, Antipolar and anticlinic mesophase order in chromatin induced by nucleosome polarity and chirality correlations, Phys. Rev. Lett. 114, 238102 (2015).
- D.S. Dean, Bing-Sui Lu, A.C. Maggs, R. Podgornik, Nonequilibrium tuning of the thermal Casimir effect, Phys. Rev. Lett. 116, 240602 (2016).
- T. Markovich, D. Andelman, R. Podgornik, Charged Membranes: Poisson-Boltzmann theory, DLVO paradigm and beyond, Chapter 9 in: Handbook of Lipid Membranes, ed. by C. Safynia and J. Raedler, Taylor & Francis (2020).
- L. M. Woods, D. A. R. Dalvit, A. Tkatchenko, P. Rodriguez-Lopez, A. W. Rodriguez, R. Podgornik, A Materials Perspective on Casimir and van der Waals Interactions, Reviews of Modern Physics 88 045003 (2016).
- M.A. Aksoyoglu, R. Podgornik, S.M. Bezrukov, P.A. Gurnev, M. Muthukumar, V.A. Parsegian, Size dependent forced PEG partitioning into channels: VDAC, OmpC and Alpha-Haemolysin, Proc. Natl. Acad. Sci. 113 9003-8 (2016).
- Roya Zandi, B. Dragnea, A. Travesset, R. Podgornik, On virus growth and form, Physics Reports, 847, 1-102 (2020).
- Yael Avni, D. Andelman, R. Podgornik, Charge regulation with fixed and mobile charged macromolecules, Current Opinion in Electrochemistry, 13 70-77 (2019).
- Broer, W. and Lu, Bing-Sui and Podgornik, R., Qualitative chirality effects on the Casimir-Lifshitz torque with liquid crystals, Phys. Rev. Research, 3 033238(2021).

== Awards ==
In 1986-1989 he was awarded the 'Fogarty fellowship', at the Laboratory of Structural Biology, Division of Computer Research and Technology, 'National Institutes of Health, Bethesda'. In 1992 he received a postdoctoral fellowship of the Swedish Research Council at Physical Chemistry 2 of the 'Chemical Center (Kemicentrum) at Lund University'. In 1995 he was the recipient of the Division of computer research and technology Director's award for "recognition and appreciation of special achievement" ('National Institutes of Health, Bethesda'). In 1999 he was the recipient of the Zois Award, which is the highest prize for scientific excellence in Slovenia . In 2002 he was awarded the 'CNRS Chercheur Associe' fellowship at the 'Laboratoire de Physique des Solides - UMR 8502 Universite Paris Sud 11'. In 2008 he was a co-recipient of the Martin Hirschorn IAC Prize, made possible by the generosity of Martin Hirschorn, given once every two years and funded by the INCE Foundation. In 2015 he was awarded the Joliot chair fellowship of the 'Ecole supérieure de physique et de chimie industrielles de la ville de Paris (ESPCI)'. In 2016-2017 he was awarded the Sackler Scholar award and became a 'Nirit and Michael Shaoul Fellow', within the framework of the Mortimer and Raymond Sackler Institute of Advanced Studies, Tel Aviv University, Israel'. From 2017 to 2019 he became a Foreign expert in the 1000 talents program of the Chinese government at the University of Chinese Academy of Sciences in Beijing. In 2020 he received the Key project grant of the 'National natural science foundation of China'.
