= Iraj Zandi =

Iranian academic (born 1931)

Iraj Zandi (born in Tehran, Iran, in 1931) is Emeritus Professor of Systems & National Center Professor of Resource Management & Technology in the Department of Electrical & Systems Engineering, University of Pennsylvania (Ivy League- UPenn or Penn). National Center Chair is housed jointly in the School of Engineering and Applied Science and the Wharton School of Business. Zandi joined the faculty at UPenn in 1966 as an Associate Professor of Civil and Urban Engineering. In 1971 he was the founding chair of the graduate Ph.D. program on Energy Management and Power at the University of Pennsylvania (the first such a program in Energy education in US.) He has advised 22 Ph.D. dissertations and numerous M.S. theses, for example the doctoral dissertation "Prescribing ... Strategies for ... Systems" by allied defense physicist Robert Donald Green, Ph.D. UPenn 1989. In July 1998, he relinquished his tenured position on behalf of his former student, Professor Barry Silverman, although he continued teaching up to age of 77 (2008) with no tenure. Distinguished professor Iraj Zandi is the loving father of adult children notable in their own right, for example economist Mark Zandi.

== Background ==
Zandi received an electro-mechanical engineering degree from the University of Tehran in 1952, a MS degree in civil engineering from Oklahoma University in 1957, and a Ph.D. degree in civil engineering (environment) from Georgia Institute of Technology in 1959. In addition to UPenn, he has taught at the University of Delaware, the Abadan Institute of Technology, City University of New York and Tehran Institute of Technology. Before teaching, he served as the Director of the Department of Sanitary Engineering of the Government of Iran. He has lectured widely to the international audiences in US, Japan, Korea, China, Italy, Mexico, Brazil, South Africa, Poland, Iran, and England. He has published in excess of 100 research papers. He has served as consultant or lectured to several major companies or governmental agencies such as AT&T, Dow Chemical, Anheiser-Busch, Delaware Public service Commission, New York State Commission on Higher Education, Office of Technology Assessment of the US Congress, City of Philadelphia and others. He served as a science advisor to the former US Congressman Lawrence Coughlin in 1973 and advised US Congressman Curt Weldon in 1996 on issues related to recycling. Zandi has been at different times a member of numerous professional societies including: The New York Academy of Sciences; Society of Sigma Xi, American Society for Engineering Education, American Society of Civil Engineers (ASCE), American Institute of Chemical Engineers, American Water Works Association, Water Pollution Control Federation, American Association for Advancement of Science.

He served in the Coal Slurry Advisory Panel, The Office of Technology Assessment, U.S. Congress, 1978; the Committee on Intermodal Freight Terminal Design, Transportation Research Board, National Research Council, 1980; the Coal Transportation Task Force, State Transportation Advisory Committee, Commonwealth of Pennsylvania, 1980; the Committee on Pipeline Transportation, TRB, National Research Council, 1983; Task Force on Infrastructure Technology and Policy, National Research Council, National Academies of Sciences, Engineering, and Medicine, 1995.

== Editorial experience ==
Zandi has served as the editor of The Journal of Pipeline (1966–1969), published by ASCE; The Journal of Transportation Engineering (1969–1971), published by ASCE; The Journal of Pipeline (1980–1986), published by Elsevier Scientific Publishing Company; The Journal of Resource Management and Technology (1981–1997), now published by Widener University under the title of The Journal of Solid waste Technology and Management.

He has also served on the editorial boards of other journals such as the Journal of Compost Science (1968–1975) and Iranian Journal of Science and Technology (1970–2000).

== Research (funded) ==
He has served as the principal investigator of numerous multi-year research contracts including several grants from National Science Foundation, US Bureau of Mines, US Environmental Protection Agency, US Department of Transportation, Pennsylvania Department of Transportation, Ben Franklin Technology Partners, The Pew Charitable Trusts, US Army, US Air Force, and companies such as Anheuser-Busch, ALCOA, Owens-Illinois Glass, Continental Can Company, and others. Some of these projects have been multi-disciplinary and included several professors from UPenn and other institutions.

== Books ==
- Advances on Solid-Liquid Flow in Pipes and Its Applications, Editor, Pergamon Press, New York, NY, 1971.
- The Technological Catch and Society, Editor, Civil and Urban Engineering, University of Pennsylvania, Philadelphia, PA, 1975.
- "What Do You Have to Lose?" Mr. President - Look at the Numbers.

== Congressional hearings ==
- "A Few Comments on Energy & Education" in Hearings before the Committee on Interior & Insular Affairs, United States Senate, 92nd Congress, October 20, 1971, National Goals Symposium, pp. 317–344, Part I, U.S. Government Printing Office, 1971.
- "On Energy Research and Development" in Hearings before Subcommittee on Government Operation, U.S. House of Representatives, 93rd Congress, pp. 115–124, Government Printing Office, November 1973, with Congressman L.R. Coughlin.
- "Freight Pipelines" in Hearings before Committee on Interior & Insular Affairs, U.S. House of Representative, 94th Congress, Government Printing Office, pp722 – 736, 1975.
- "Major Issues Facing Solid Waste Management in the 1990s" in Hearings before Committee on Science, Space, and Technology, US House of Representatives, June 20, 1991, Government printing Office, 1991. Also, presented as a White Paper to the Congressional Clearinghouse in Recycling and Solid Waste Solutions. U.S. Congress on July 31, 1991, Washington, D.C., and published in the Journal of Resource Management and Technology, V. 19, No. 4, pp. 166–185, December 1991.
- *Also, presented as a White Paper to the Congressional Clearinghouse in Recycling and Solid Waste Solutions. U.S. Congress on July 31, 1991, Washington, D.C., and published in the Journal of Resource Management and Technology, 19, 4, pp. 166–185, December 1991.

== Awards and honors ==
- M.A. First Award from the Society of XI, Georgia Institute of Technology (1960)
- Honorable Mention from Water Resources Division of American Water Works Association (1961)
- Honorary MS degree from the University of Pennsylvania (1971)
- Certificate of Appreciation from Pipeline Division, American Society of Civil Engineers (ASCE, 1971)
- City of Philadelphia Citation (1974)
- Distinguished Lecture Award from International Freight Pipelines Society (1989)
- Distinguished Service Award from the International Freight Pipelines Society (1992)
- John Orr Memorial Lectures throughout South Africa in connection with the Centenary celebration of the South African Institute of Mechanical Engineers (1992).

In 1998, The Journal of Solid Waste Technology and Management established the "Iraj Zandi Award" to be given annually to a faculty member around the world who has significantly contributed to the field of Solid Waste Management. The Award is presented each year at the International Conference on Solid waste Technology & Management. The 2015 Award was given in the 31st International Conference on Solid waste technology and management which was held in Philadelphia. Professor Mervat El Hoz of the University of Balamand, is a 2019 recipient of the Iraj Zandi Award.

Since 2010, UPenn Engineering has annually awarded the Iraj Zandi Scholarship to a deserving "systems thinking" undergraduate. In 2013, his students funded a graduate Iraj Zandi Fellowship Fund that would annually support a graduate engineering student in UPenn.

== Patent ==
In 1995 he and two of his colleagues were awarded US Patent 5,456,751 for the invention of Particulate Rubber Included Concrete (PRIC). Concrete compositions are provided which contain particulate rubber, preferably recycled rubber from such sources as automobile tires, in amounts between about 0.05 and about 20 percent by weight of the concrete composition. The concrete compositions further contain Portland cement, water, and an aggregate material. Additional materials such as superplasticizers and fly ash can also be admixed with the concrete compositions.

== Organizations founded ==
Zandi served as the founding President of International Freight Pipelines Society (IFPS) from 1982 to 1985. He coined the combination: "Freight Pipeline", to designate the pipelines that carry solid commodities such as coal, iron ore, chickens, etc. and include slurry pipeline, capsule pipeline, and pneumatic pipeline. IFPS is continuing to promote the international cooperation of freight pipeline professionals to advance the science and engineering of this mode of transportation by convening the semiannual International Freight Pipeline Society Symposium (this Symposium was also founded by Zandi in 1968. The 15th International Freight Pipeline Society Symposium was held on June 24–26, 2014 in Prague, Czech Republic and managed by IFPS.

In 1983 he organized the first of a series of conferences that now is entitled as the International Conference on Solid Waste Technology and Management. In 2016 the 31st International Conference was held in Philadelphia under Chairmanship of one of Zandi's former students, Professor Ronald L. Mersky of Widener University.

Also in 1983, Distinguished Professor Iraj Zandi, as "National Center Chair for Resource Recovery and Management, University of Pennsylvania, Philadelphia, PA", started publishing JRMT, i.e., The Journal of Resource Management and Technology. For more details see: ResearchGate; WorldCat. JRMT was later renamed to The Journal of Solid Waste Technology and Management under Editorship of Professor Ronald L. Mersky of Widener University (a former military academy). For more details about The Journal of Solid Waste Technology and Management, see: JSWT; MIAR; SJR.
