= Economists' statement opposing the Bush tax cuts =

The Economists' statement opposing the Bush tax cuts was a statement signed by roughly 450 economists, including ten of the twenty-four American Nobel Prize laureates alive at the time, in February 2003 who urged the U.S. President George W. Bush not to enact the 2003 tax cuts; seeking and sought to gather public support for the position. The statement was printed as a full-page ad in The New York Times and released to the public through the Economic Policy Institute. According to the statement, the 450 plus economists who signed the statement believe that the 2003 Bush tax cuts will increase inequality and the budget deficit, decreasing the ability of the U.S. government to fund essential services, while failing to produce economic growth.

In rebuttal, 250 plus economists who supported the tax plan wrote that the new plan would "create more employment, economic growth, and opportunities for all Americans."

== Content ==
The statement reads as follows:

Economic growth, though positive, has not been sufficient to generate jobs and prevent unemployment from rising. In fact, there are now more than two million fewer private sector jobs than at the start of the current recession. Overcapacity, corporate scandals, and uncertainty have and will continue to weigh down the economy.

The tax cut plan proposed by President Bush is not the answer to these problems. Regardless of how one views the specifics of the Bush plan, there is wide agreement that its purpose is a permanent change in the tax structure and not the creation of jobs and growth in the near-term. The permanent dividend tax cut, in particular, is not credible as a short-term stimulus. As tax reform, the dividend tax cut is misdirected in that it targets individuals rather than corporations, is overly complex, and could be, but is not, part of a revenue-neutral tax reform effort.

Passing these tax cuts will worsen the long-term budget outlook, adding to the nation’s projected chronic deficits. This fiscal deterioration will reduce the capacity of the government to finance Social Security and Medicare benefits as well as investments in schools, health, infrastructure, and basic research. Moreover, the proposed tax cuts will generate further inequalities in after-tax income.

To be effective, a stimulus plan should rely on immediate but temporary spending and tax measures to expand demand, and it should also rely on immediate but temporary incentives for investment. Such a stimulus plan would spur growth and jobs in the short term without exacerbating the long-term budget outlook.

== Signatories ==
Over 450 economists signed the statement, including the following eleven Nobel Prize Laureates:

- George Akerlof, University of California – Berkeley
- Kenneth J. Arrow, Stanford University
- Peter Diamond, Massachusetts Institute of Technology
- Lawrence R. Klein University of Pennsylvania
- Daniel L. McFadden University of California – Berkeley
- Franco Modigliani Massachusetts Institute of Technology
- Douglass C. North Washington University
- Paul A. Samuelson Massachusetts Institute of Technology
- William F. Sharpe Stanford University
- Robert M. Solow Massachusetts Institute of Technology
- Joseph Stiglitz Columbia University

== Response ==
The letter provoked a response from 250 signatories who supported the Bush tax cuts. Signatories of the rebuttal letter included:

- Annelise Anderson Stanford University
- James T. Bennett George Mason University
- Martin Feldstein Harvard University
- Joel W. Hay University of Southern California
- Robert J. Hodrick Columbia University
- Michael C. Jensen Harvard Business School
- Burton Malkiel Princeton University
- Gregory Mankiw Harvard University
- Carmen M. Reinhart International Monetary Fund
- Vernon L. Smith George Mason University (Nobel Laureate)
- Richard E. Wagner George Mason University
- Steven N. Kaplan University of Chicago
- Edward C. Prescott University of Minnesota (Nobel Laureate)
