= Mark Zandi =

American economist (born 1959)

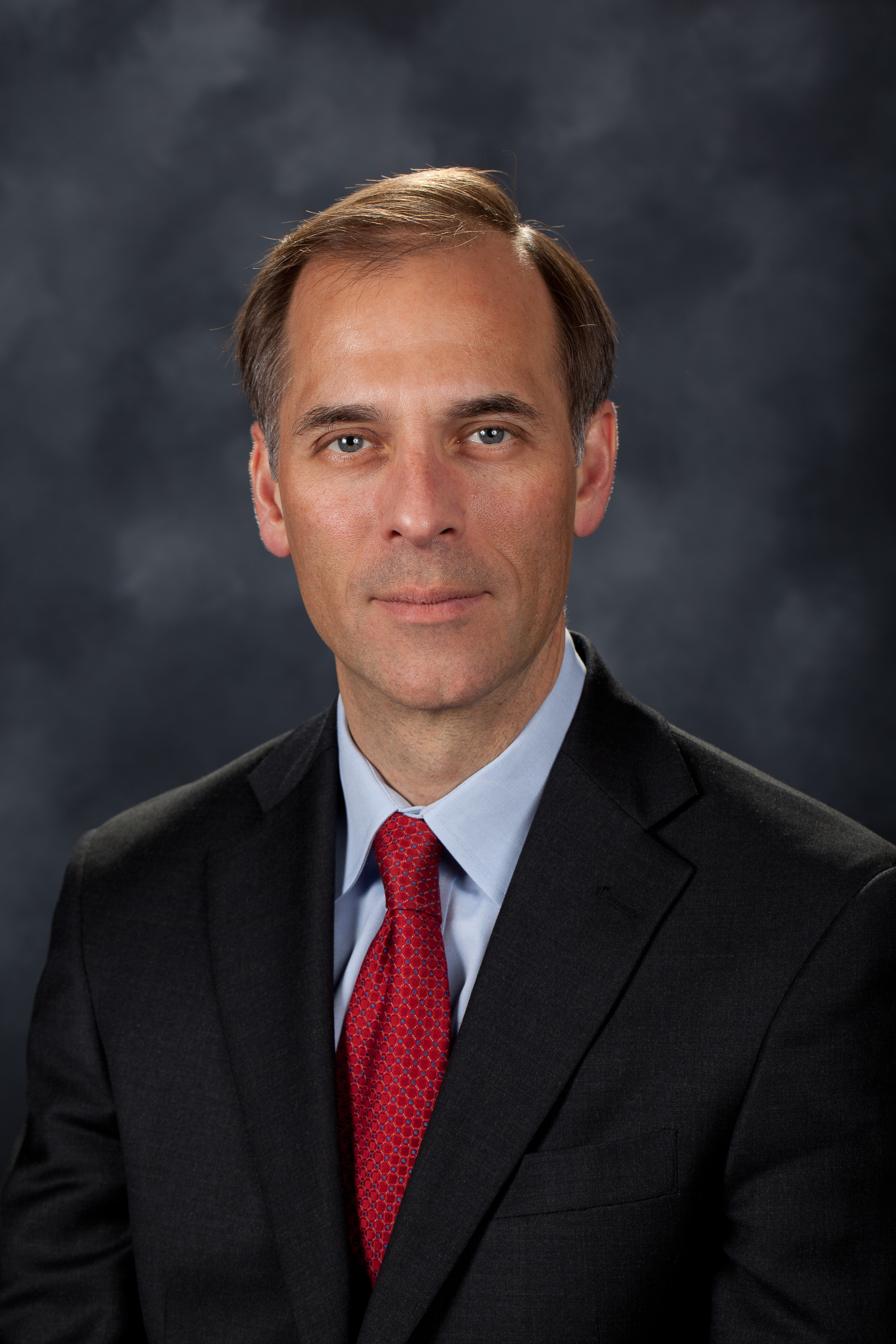
- Born: 1959 (age 66–67); Atlanta, Georgia, U.S.
- Education: University of Pennsylvania (BS, MS, PhD)
- Relatives: Iraj Zandi (Father)

Mark M. Zandi (born 1959) is an Iranian-American economist who is the chief economist of Moody's Analytics, where he directs economic research.

Zandi's research interests encompass macroeconomics, financial markets and public policy. He analyzes the economic impact of government spending policies and monetary policy response. A trusted advisor to policy makers, he has testified before Congress on the economic outlook, the nation's fiscal challenges, fiscal stimulus and financial regulatory reform. Zandi also publishes on mortgage finance reform and the determinants of foreclosure and personal bankruptcy. In 2005, he was one of the first economists to warn of an impending financial crisis that became the 2008 financial crisis.

== Early life and education ==
Zandi was born in Atlanta, Georgia, and is of Iranian descent. The son of Professor Iraj Zandi, he grew up in Radnor, Pennsylvania.

Zandi received his B.S. in economics from the Wharton School of the University of Pennsylvania and a Ph.D. in economics from the University of Pennsylvania.

== Career ==
Zandi was a regional economist at Chase Econometrics, prior to co-founding Economy.com in 1990. Moody's Corporation purchased Economy.com in 2005. Economy.com subsequently became part of Moody's Analytics, a subsidiary of Moody's Corporation.

As Chief Economist of Moody's Analytics, Zandi oversees the global economic forecast and directs the activities of the economic research team. He publishes his outlook for the economy monthly, produces research on key topics and conducts regular briefings for clients, businesses, corporate boards and trade associations.

Zandi is a regular contributor to The Washington Post and The Philadelphia Inquirer, and is a frequent guest on CBS' Face the Nation, Fox Business, SiriusXM's Wharton Business Daily, C-SPAN, CNBC, NPR, NBC's Meet the Press, CNN, and various other media outlets.

Zandi is on the board of directors of MGIC, the nation's largest private mortgage insurance company, and served on the board of The Reinvestment Fund, a large CDFI that makes investments in disadvantaged neighborhoods, stepping down as director in January 2023.

== Writings and research ==
In 2008, Zandi wrote the book Financial Shock: A 360° Look at the Subprime Mortgage Implosion, and How to Avoid the Next Financial Crisis and in 2012 he wrote Paying the Price: Ending the Great Recession and Beginning a New American Century. Zandi's analysis of the impact of an economic stimulus package on the United States economy was cited by Christina Romer and Jared Bernstein in their report on President Barack Obama's proposed American Recovery and Reinvestment Plan, which became the American Recovery and Reinvestment Act of 2009. Zandi has authored multiple studies and op-eds, including:

- Protecting Workers and Businesses in the COVID Crisis
- A Timely, Simple Idea to Boost Affordable Housing
- Solving The Student Debt Crisis: Increase Education Supply
- Pride and Protectionism: U.S. Trade Policy and Its Impact on Asia
- Fear the Robots? Better to Embrace them and Adjust
- A Better Economy Under Trump Seems Unlikely
- The Financial Crisis: Lessons for the Next One
- A General Theory of G-Fees
- Time for the Government to Reduce its Role in the Mortgage Business
- Gas Prices and the Economy
- Reforming Fannie and Freddie
- How the Great Recession Was Brought to an End
- Policymaking Through a Panic
- Where are the Regulators?
