= Roya Zandi =

American physicist

Roya Zandi is an American physicist whose research involves the self-assembly of the viruses and fluctuation-induced or Casimir forces. She is a professor of physics and astronomy at the University of California, Riverside, and the director of the university's biophysics graduate program.

== Education and career ==
Zandi studied physics at California State University, Northridge, graduating summa cum laude in 1992 and continuing for a master's degree in 1994.. She went to the University of California, Los Angeles (UCLA) for doctoral study in physics, completing her Ph.D. in 2001. Her dissertation, Nucleosomes and Polyelectrolytes, was supervised by Joseph Rudnick.

After postdoctoral research at UCLA and the Massachusetts Institute of Technology, Zandi became a faculty member at UC Riverside in 2005.

== Recognition ==
UC Riverside gave Zandi their Commitment to Graduate Diversity Award in 2019, and named her as Endowed Term Chair for Inclusive Excellence in 2021, for her efforts in encouraging and training a diverse group of students.

She was named a Fellow of the American Physical Society (APS) in 2022, after a nomination from the APS Division of Biological Physics, "for the application of fundamental theories of elasticity, electrostatics, and phase transitions to elucidate unique physical phenomena arising in viral capsid formation, notably the origin of icosahedral symmetry, the role of disclinations, and the branched topology of RNA genomes".
